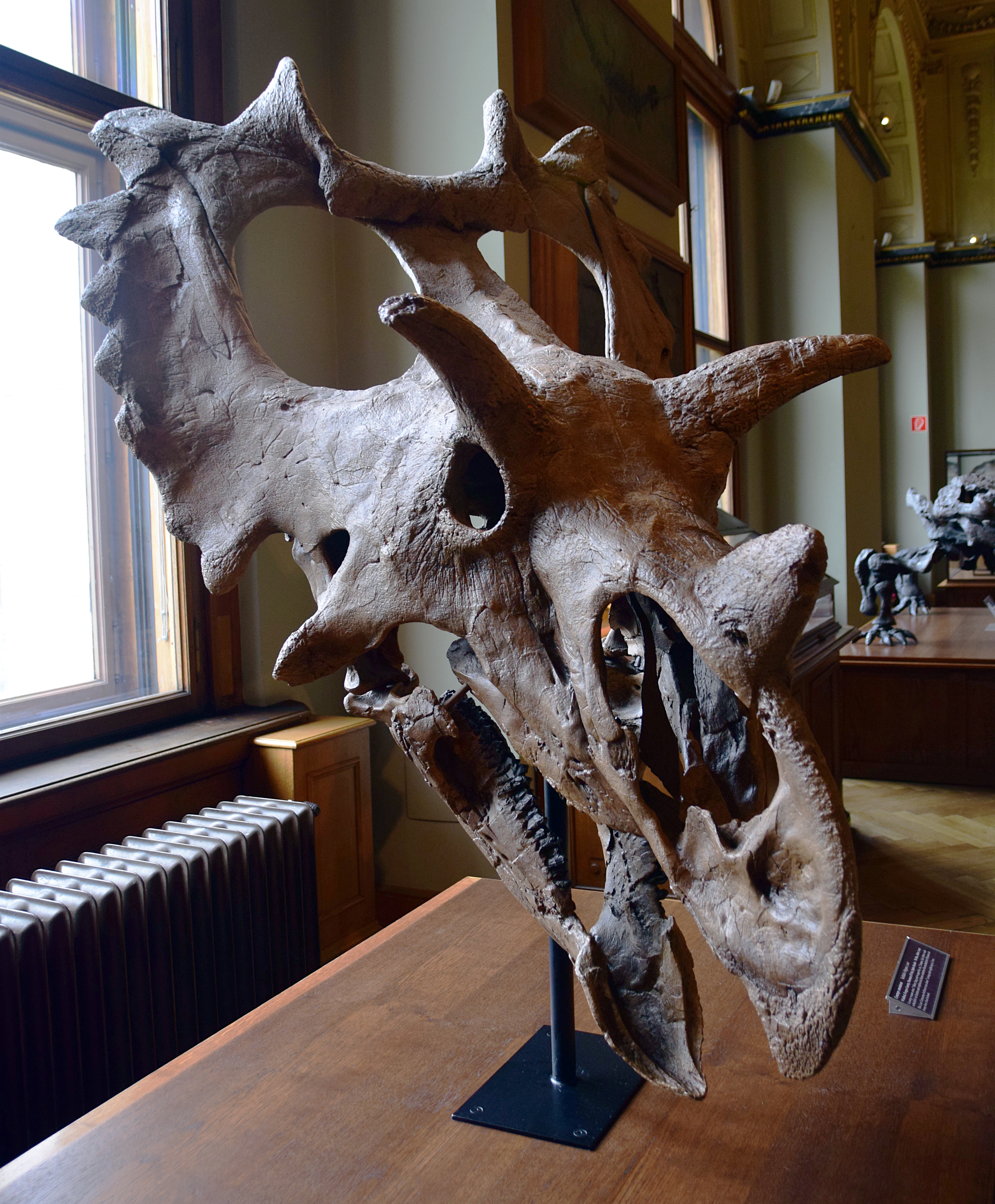
- Skull cast in Vienna

Scientific classification
- Kingdom: Animalia
- Phylum: Chordata
- Class: Reptilia
- Clade: Dinosauria
- Clade: †Ornithischia
- Clade: †Ceratopsia
- Family: †Ceratopsidae
- Subfamily: †Chasmosaurinae
- Genus: †Spiclypeus; Mallon et al., 2016
- Species: †S. shipporum

Binomial name
- †Spiclypeus shipporum Mallon et al., 2016

= Spiclypeus =

Spiclypeus Temporal range: Late Cretaceous, 76.24–75.21 Ma

Extinct genus of dinosaurs

Spiclypeus (meaning "spike shield") is an extinct genus of chasmosaurine ceratopsian dinosaur known from the Late Cretaceous Judith River Formation (late Campanian stage) of Montana, United States.

== Discovery ==
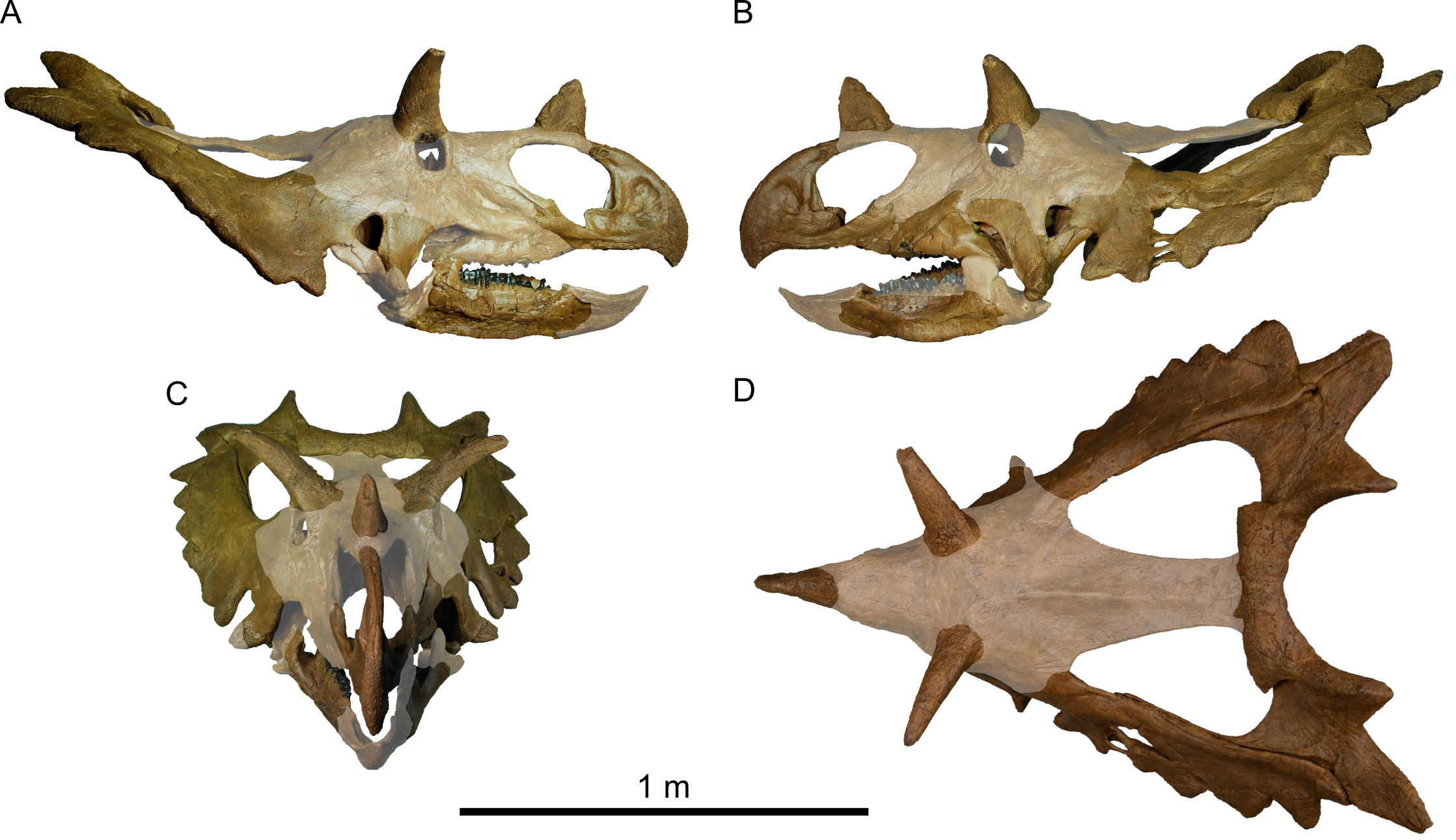
Skull reconstruction in multiple views, missing parts shown faded

In 2000, Bill D. Shipp, a nuclear physicist, bought the Paradise Point Ranch near the town of Winifred, in Fergus County. Believing that his land contained fossils, Shipp hired the local veteran fossil collector John C. Gilpatrick to explore the terrain together. On their first trip during an afternoon in September 2005, Shipp found the Spiclypeus specimen on his land in Montana. He saw a thighbone jutting out of a hillside at the Judith River Breaks. Shipp then hired the amateur paleontologist Joe Small to excavate the fossils. At the cost of several hundred thousand dollars, a road was constructed to allow an excavator to remove the overburden covering the skull of the specimen. In 2007, Small and his team managed to secure all remaining bones. The fossils were prepared in the White River Preparium at Hill City. They were studied by Christopher Ott at the Weis Earth Science Museum in Menasha to provide a scientific description. Peter Larson of the Black Hills Institute made casts of the bones. These were used to make a complete skull reconstruction, missing parts being based on those of Triceratops. Of this reconstruction again casts were made, sold to several musea. During this time the specimen was informally called "Judith" after the Judith River Formation. In February 2015, paleontologist Jordan Mallon was asked to cooperate in writing a scientific publication naming the taxon. The specimen was sold to the Canadian Museum of Nature for $350,000, covering Shipp's expenses.

Spiclypeus contains a single species, S. shipporum, first described and named in 2016 by Jordan C. Mallon, Christopher J. Ott, Peter L. Larson, Edward M. Iuliano and David C. Evans. The generic name is derived from Latin spica, meaning "spike", and clypeus, meaning "shield", in reference to its unique frill ornamented by many large spike-like horn ossifications on its margin. The specific name shipporum honours Dr. Bill and Linda Shipp, the original owners of the type specimen, and their family.

Spiclypeus is known solely from the holotype CMN 57081 which is housed at the Canadian Museum of Nature in Ottawa, Ontario. It is represented by a partial disarticulated skull (~50% complete), as well as several postcranial elements, among them vertebrae, ribs, a left humerus, a left ilium and the left hindlimb. Missing skull elements include the skull roof, the palate, the predentary and the rear of the lower jaws. It was collected from the lower Coal Ridge Member of the Campanian Judith River Formation several meters above the mid-Judith discontinuity, which dates it to between 76.24±0.18 and 75.21±0.12 million years ago.

== Description ==
=== Size and distinguishing traits ===
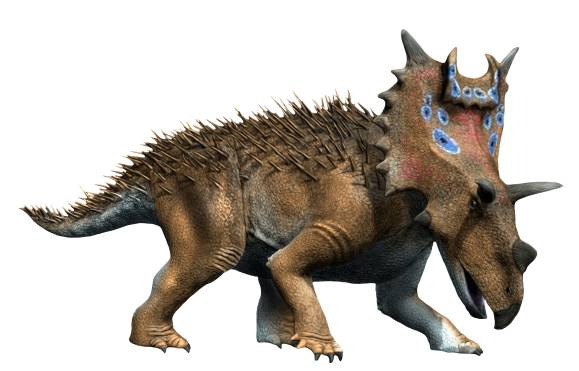
Life restoration with speculative quills

Spiclypeus has an estimated length of 4.5–6 metres (15–20 ft) and a weight of about three to four tonnes.

Spiclypeus is unique among Chasmosaurinae in having a wrinkled nose bone contact on the side surface of the rear projection of the premaxilla. Spiclypeus is also unique in having the trait combination of eye-socket horncores that project to above and sideways, all six epiparietals (frill horns) that are fused at their base, first two epiparietals pairs that curl down the frill surface on its front side, and third epiparietal pair that points back and towards the mid-line of the frill.

Among other chasmosaurines from the Judith River Formation, Spiclypeus can be directly distinguished from Judiceratops, Medusaceratops and Mercuriceratops. However, it is morphologically similar to the dubious ceratopsid species Ceratops montanus from the Judith River Formation and the dubious chasmosaurine species Pentaceratops aquilonius from the Dinosaur Park Formation (located just over the Canada–United States border and close in age) and in fact all three might represent a single species, which cannot be conclusively tested due to the fragmentary nature of the type specimens of these species.

=== Skeleton ===
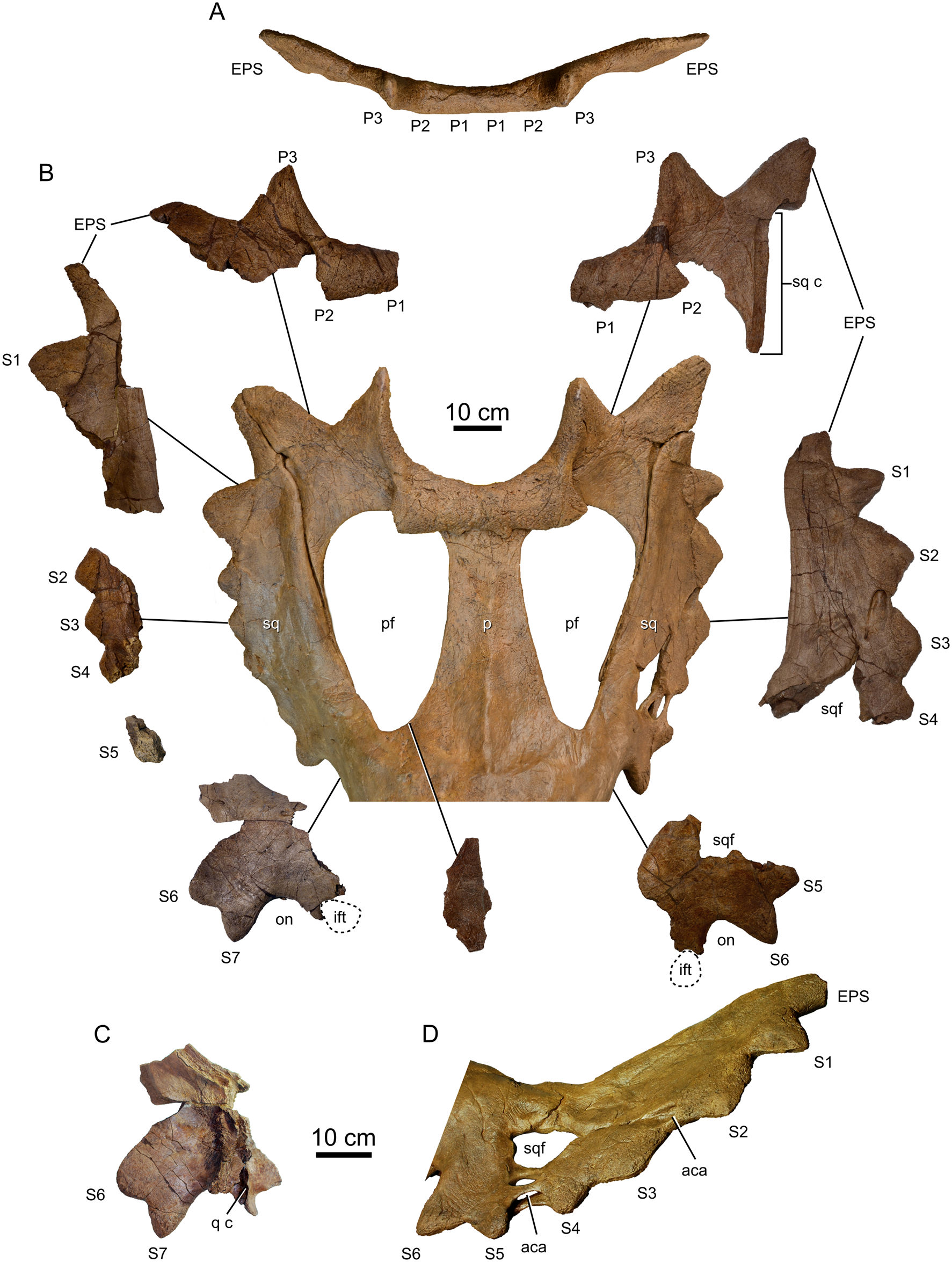
Elements of the frill and reconstruction

The skull has a reconstructed length of 167 centimetres. The rostral bone, the core of the upper beak, is strongly hooked. The ascending branch of the premaxilla has a very rough outer surface, with many deep pits, indicating a strong connection to the nasal bone. The depressions on the outer sides of the premaxillae are not connected by a perforation, though the separating bone sheath is very thin at one millimetre. The triangular nose horn has a length of 166 millimetres. The maxilla has at least twenty-eight positions in the tooth battery, each featuring three to five stacked teeth. The postorbital, or brow, horns are 228 (left) and 246 (right) millimetres long. They strongly project to the side, at an angle of 50° with the midline of the skull. Their points gradually curve to below.

The relatively flat skull frill has a triangular profile in top view, with slightly convex sides and diverging rear corners separated by a broad notch on the rear edge. The structure is pierced by large elongated openings, the parietal fenestrae. The frill of Spiclypeus features a unique pattern of skin ossifications or osteoderms ornamenting its edge. The side bones of the neck shield, the squamosals, bear episquamosals, with the holotype individual six on the left side and seven on the right side. The front episquamosal projects into the jugal notch between the frill and the cheek elements and forms a triangle six to seven centimetres in length. More to the rear, the episquamosals gradually become wider and lower, but ultimately increase in length again.

The rear bones of the frill, the parietals, each carry three epiparietals. In Spiclypeus these are very wide osteoderms, connected and fused at their bases to form a continuous bone sheath covering almost the entire rear edge of the frill. At the wide notch at the centre of the rear frill edge, this sheath curls to the front, overgrowing the transverse parietal bar behind the fenestrae. The bone flap represents the first and second epiparietal pairs, the "P1s" and "P2s", as is evidenced by the osteoderm points still being visible, those of the first pair pointing to the front near the midline, those of the second pair forming the corners of the flap. The third epiparietals, pointing to behind, together form a pincer-like construction around the notch. At each rear corner of the frill a very large osteoderm is present. As it spans the suture between the squamosal and the parietal, this has been called an epiparietosquamosal or "EPS".

== Classification ==
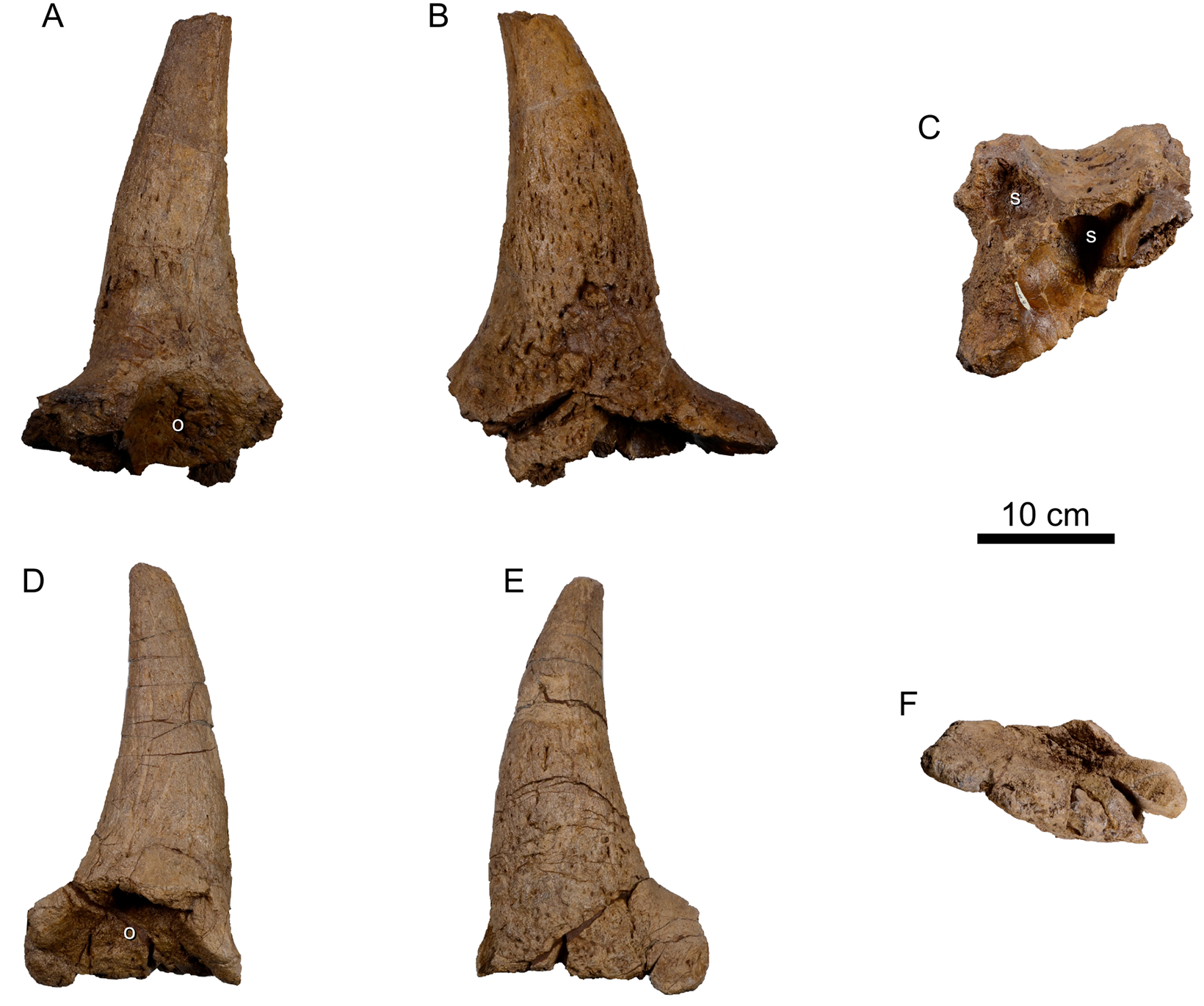
Postorbital horncores in multiple views

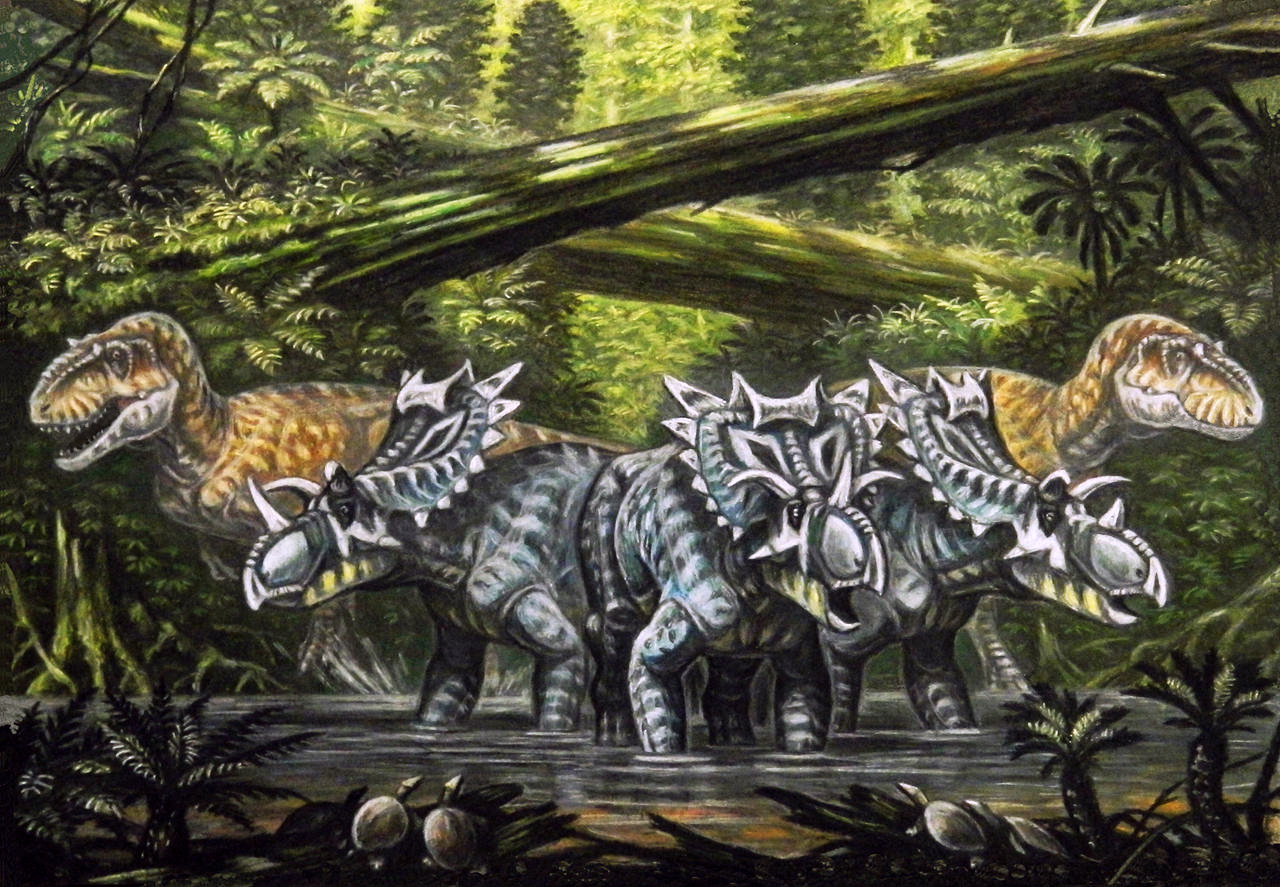
Spiclypeus group defending against Daspletosaurus

Spiclypeus was placed in the Chasmosaurinae by Mallon et al. (2016). It was part of the Chasmosaurus instead of the Triceratops branch, as a sister species of a clade formed by Kosmoceratops and Vagaceratops. Below is the result of their phylogenetic analysis after the removal of Bravoceratops that groups either with Coahuilaceratops or in the Triceratops branch, and Eotriceratops that was found to decrease resolution in the Triceratops branch. Within Triceratopsini the analysis recovered a polytomy of six taxa including Ojoceratops, Titanoceratops, Nedoceratops, Torosaurus latus, "Torosaurus" utahensis, and a clade formed by the two species of Triceratops.

- Ceratopsidae
  - Centrosaurinae
  - Chasmosaurinae
    - - - - Utahceratops gettyi
          - - Pentaceratops sternbergii
            - - Spiclypeus shipporum
              - - Kosmoceratops richardsoni
                - Vagaceratops irvinensis
        - - Agujaceratops mariscalensis
          - - Mojoceratops perifania
            - - Chasmosaurus belli
              - Chasmosaurus russelli
      - Coahuilaceratops magnacuerna
    - - Anchiceratops ornatus
      - Regaliceratops peterhewsi
      - - Arrhinoceratops brachyops
        - Triceratopsini

== Paleobiology ==
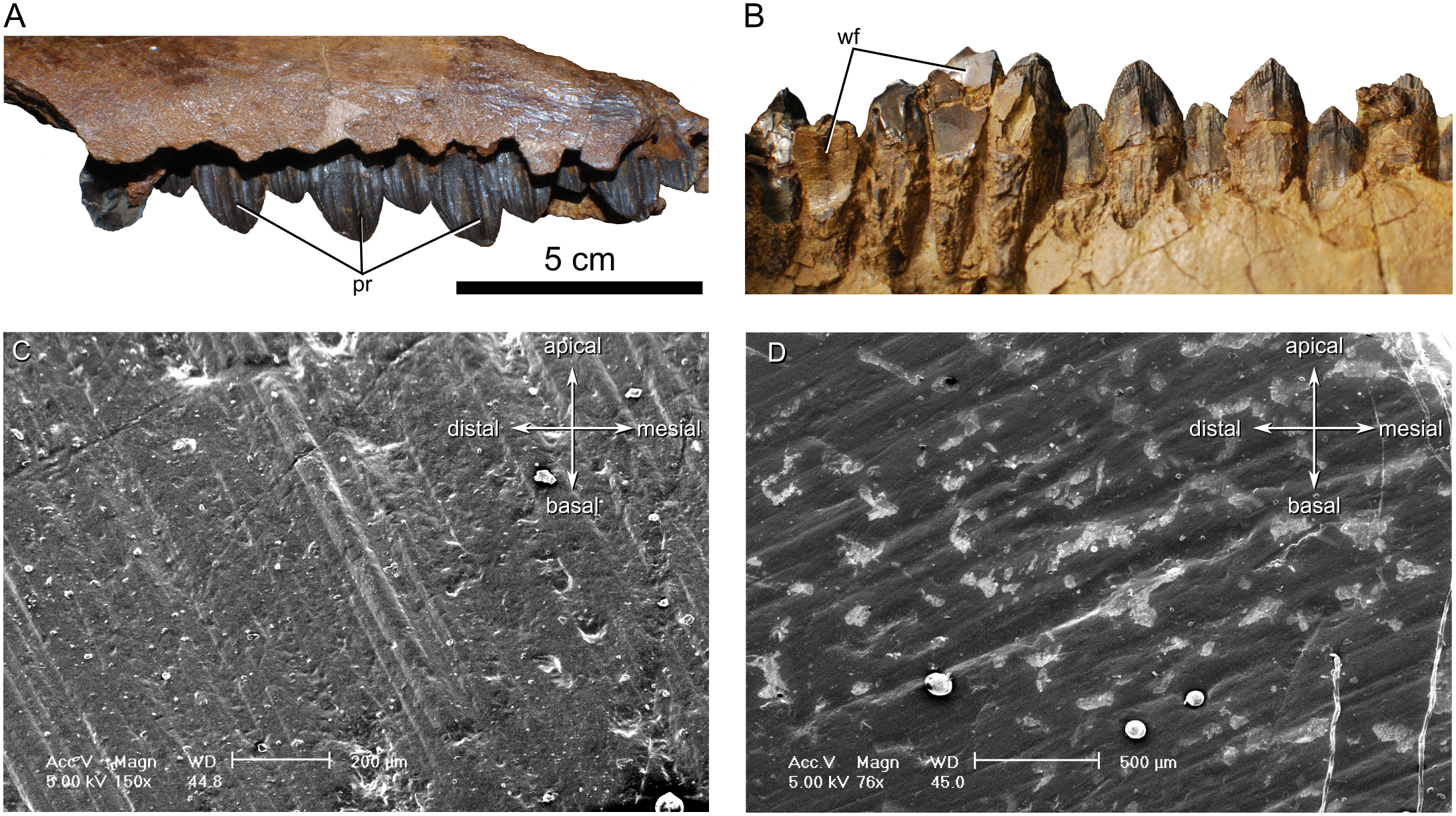
Teeth and microwear

The type specimen of Spiclypeus appears to have sustained a significant infection in its frill, hypothesised by the authors to have been due to an injury inflicted by a rival of its own species. However, more evidence is needed to determine the cause of the infection. Both the left and right squamosal had received longitudinal injuries. In itself it is not exceptional that adult individuals developed holes in their squamosals, due to bone resorption at an advanced age. However, the perforations in the shield of the Spiclypeus holotype are different in having a parallel orientation and being located close to the frill edge. It was concluded that they were probably the result of intraspecific combat, the brow horns of an opponent having pierced the shield bone.

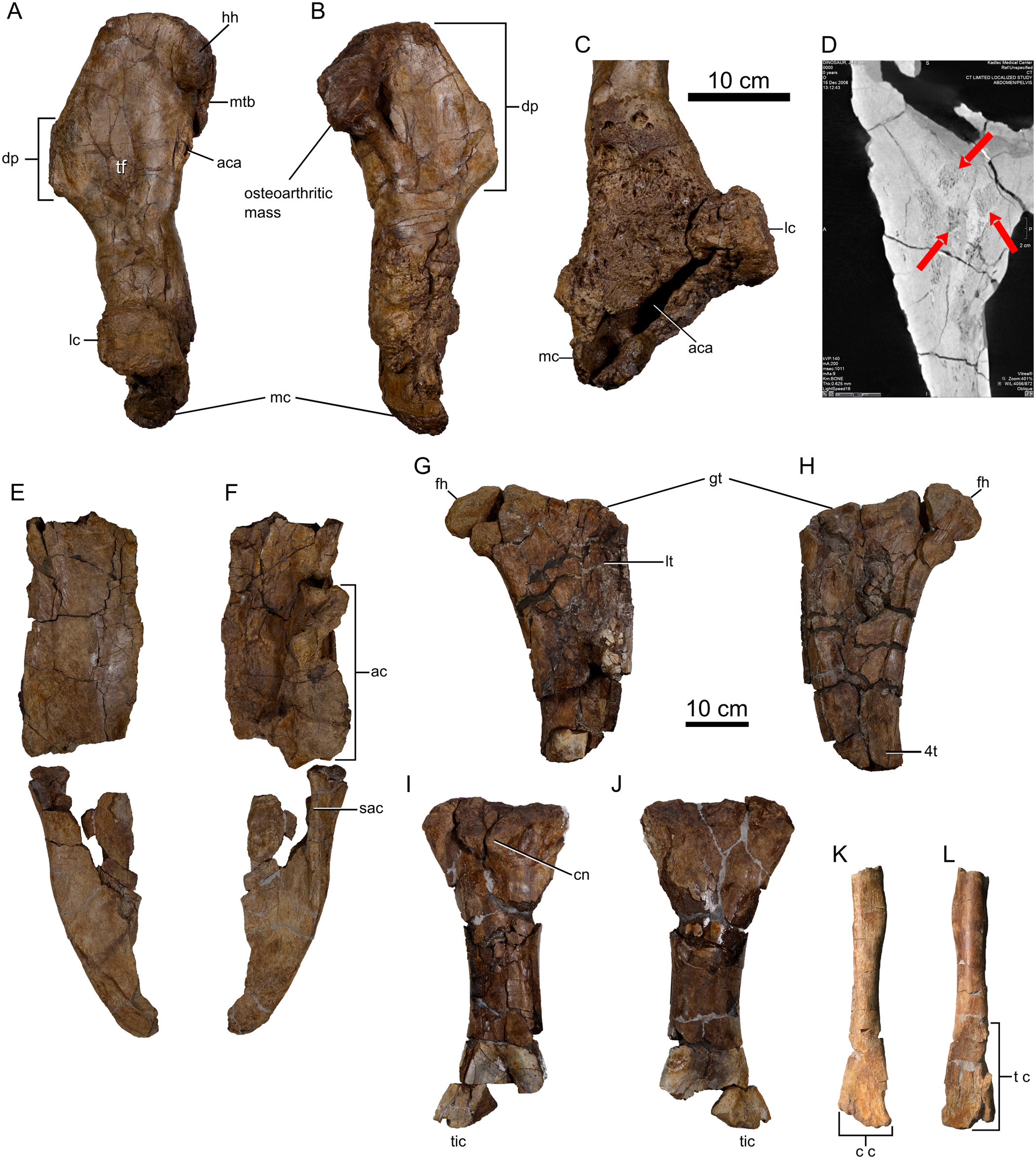
Humerus with evidence of infection (A-D), and ilium, femur, tibia, and fibula

Another, much more serious, infection was present in the left humerus. The entire lower half of the bone was diseased. Most of the lower joint surface must have been dysfunctional, a large abscess having largely eaten away the condyles. The bone had been reworked in reaction, rotating the joint over 90° from its normal orientation. In the middle of the shaft a deep drainage canal had developed, through which the pus ran out. Extensive remodelling of the bone shows that the infection had not been immediately lethal and was perhaps the result of a less virulent tuberculosis or fungus. The upper part of the humerus also was pathological, showing a large arthritic bone mass.

Examination of the specimen's bones also indicates that this specimen was a mature individual at least ten years of age as there were no signs of on-going rapid growth associated with juvenile ceratopsians.

The calfbone was sawed to determine the number of "lines of arrested growth" that are usually interpreted as annual growth lines. Seven of these LAGs are present and probably a minimum number of three lines had been obfuscated by later growth processes, resulting in the minimum age estimate of ten years. That the holotype individual had reached a relatively advanced age despite the severe infections, reflects the generally robust ceratopsid build.

== See also ==
- Timeline of ceratopsian research
- 2016 in paleontology
