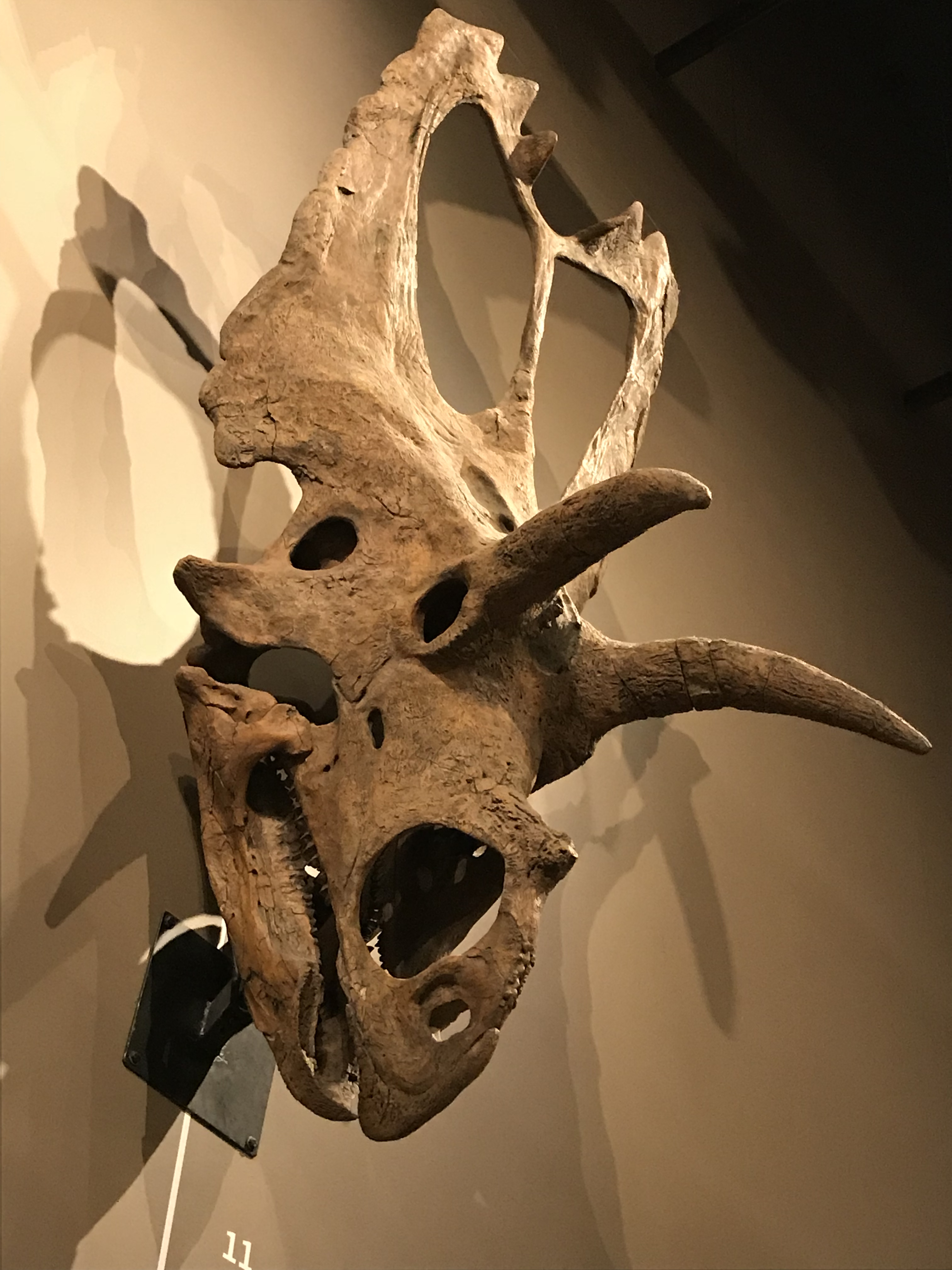
- Skull of Coahuilaceratops

Scientific classification
- Kingdom: Animalia
- Phylum: Chordata
- Class: Reptilia
- Clade: Dinosauria
- Clade: †Ornithischia
- Clade: †Ceratopsia
- Family: †Ceratopsidae
- Subfamily: †Chasmosaurinae
- Genus: †Coahuilaceratops; Loewen et al., 2010
- Species: †C. magnacuerna

Binomial name
- †Coahuilaceratops magnacuerna Loewen et al., 2010

= Coahuilaceratops =

Coahuilaceratops Temporal range: Late Cretaceous (early Maastrichtian) ~71.5–70.5 Ma

Genus of ceratopsian dinosaurs

Coahuilaceratops (meaning "horned face from Coahuila") is a genus of chasmosaurine ceratopsian dinosaur that lived during the early Maastrichtian age of the Late Cretaceous epoch, about 71.5 to 70.5 million years ago in what is now northern Mexico. It contains a single species, Coahuilaceratops magnacuerna.

== Discovery and naming ==
Fossils of Coahuilaceratops were discovered by Claudio de Leon near the town of Porvenir de Jalpa in the south of Coahuila, Mexico in 2001 and excavated in 2003. The deposits where the remains were found were originally assigned to the Cerro del Pueblo Formation (upper Campanian; ca. 73–72.5 Ma), but in a 2024 stratigraphic revision they were assigned to the overlying Cerro Huerta Formation (lower Maastrichtian; about 71.5–70.5 million years). This makes Coahuilaceratops the first dinosaur described from the Cerro Huerta Formation. The lower Maastrichtian age of the deposits is consistent with the relatively derived phylogenetic position of Coahuilaceratops.

Over the course of two years, the Coahuilaceratops fossils were prepared by volunteer preparator Jerry Golden at the Natural History Museum of Utah. The holotype CPC 276 is represented mainly by unarticulated bones of the skull of an adult individual: rostral bone, left premaxilla, right maxilla, fused nasal bones, incomplete left and right supraorbital horncores, part of the parietosquasomal frill, predentary, both dentaries, and unprepared postcranial material. Another specimen, CPC 277, contains unarticulated juvenile skeletal elements, including predentary, dentary, and unprepared postcranial material.

The name of the dinosaur was mentioned in the press in 2008 as an informal designation (nomen nudum). Coahuilaceratops magnacuerna was formally described by paleontologists Mark A. Loewen, Scott D. Sampson, Eric K. Lund, Andrew A. Farke, Martha C. Aguillón Martínez, Claudio A. de Leon, Rubén A. Rodríguez de la Rosa, Michael A. Getty, and David A. Eberth in 2010. The generic name combines "Coahuila", the state of origin, with the Ancient Greek suffix "-ceratops", meaning "horned face", which is common for ceratopsians. The specific name refers to the large size of horns and comes from the Latin word "magna", meaning "great", and the Spanish word "cuerna", meaning "horn".

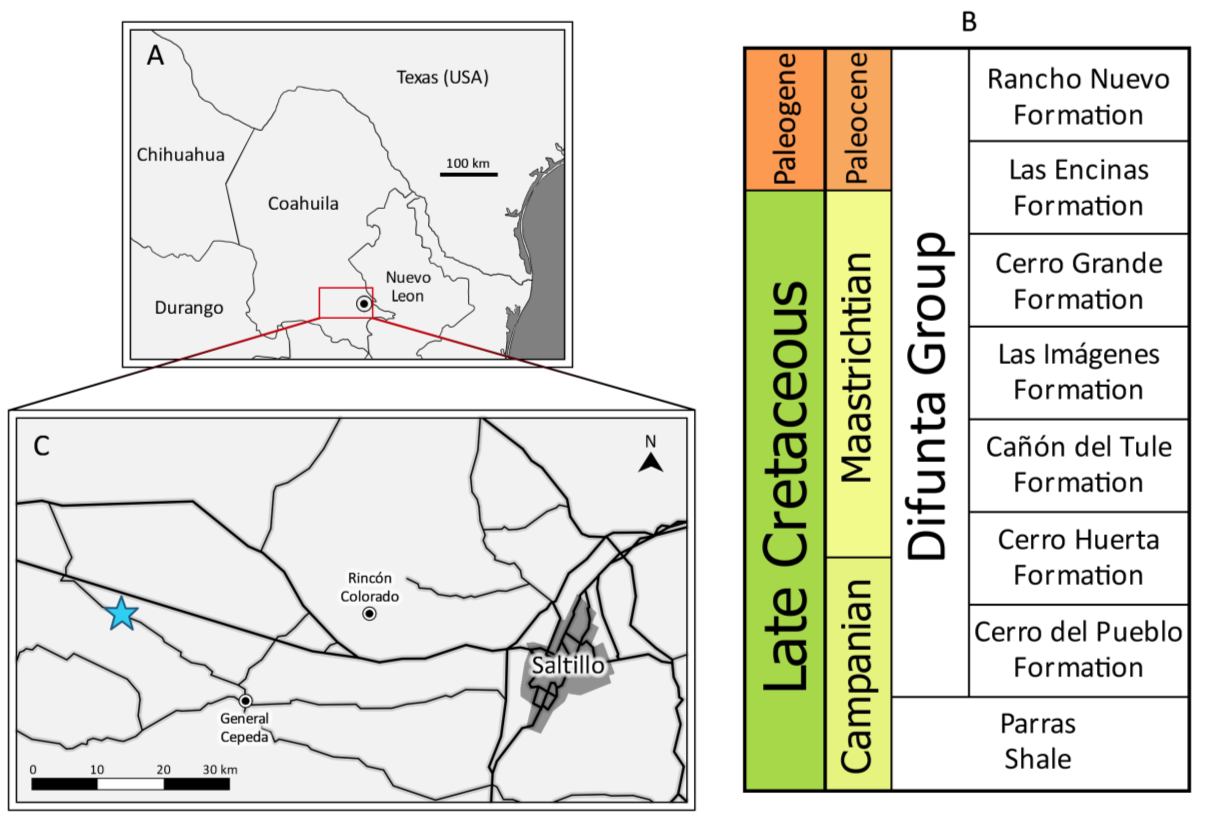
Geographic and stratigraphic setting of the site where the fossils of Coahuilaceratops were found (belonging to the Cerro Huerta Formation)

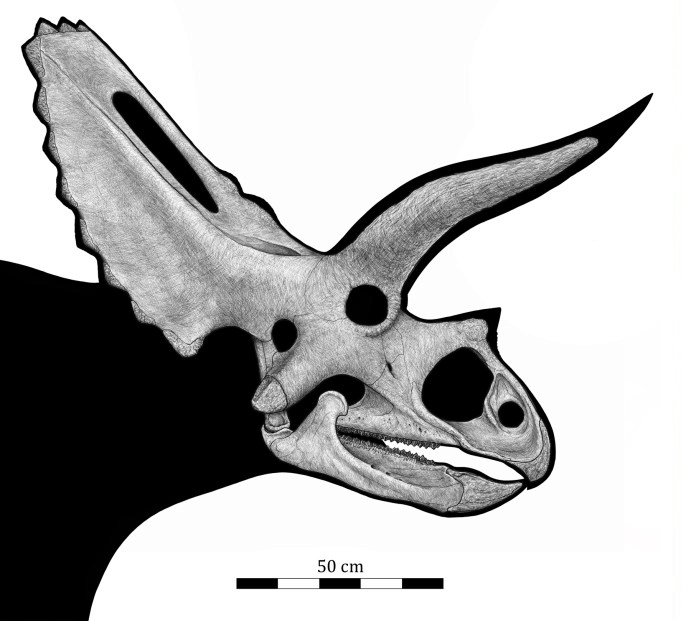
Skull reconstruction

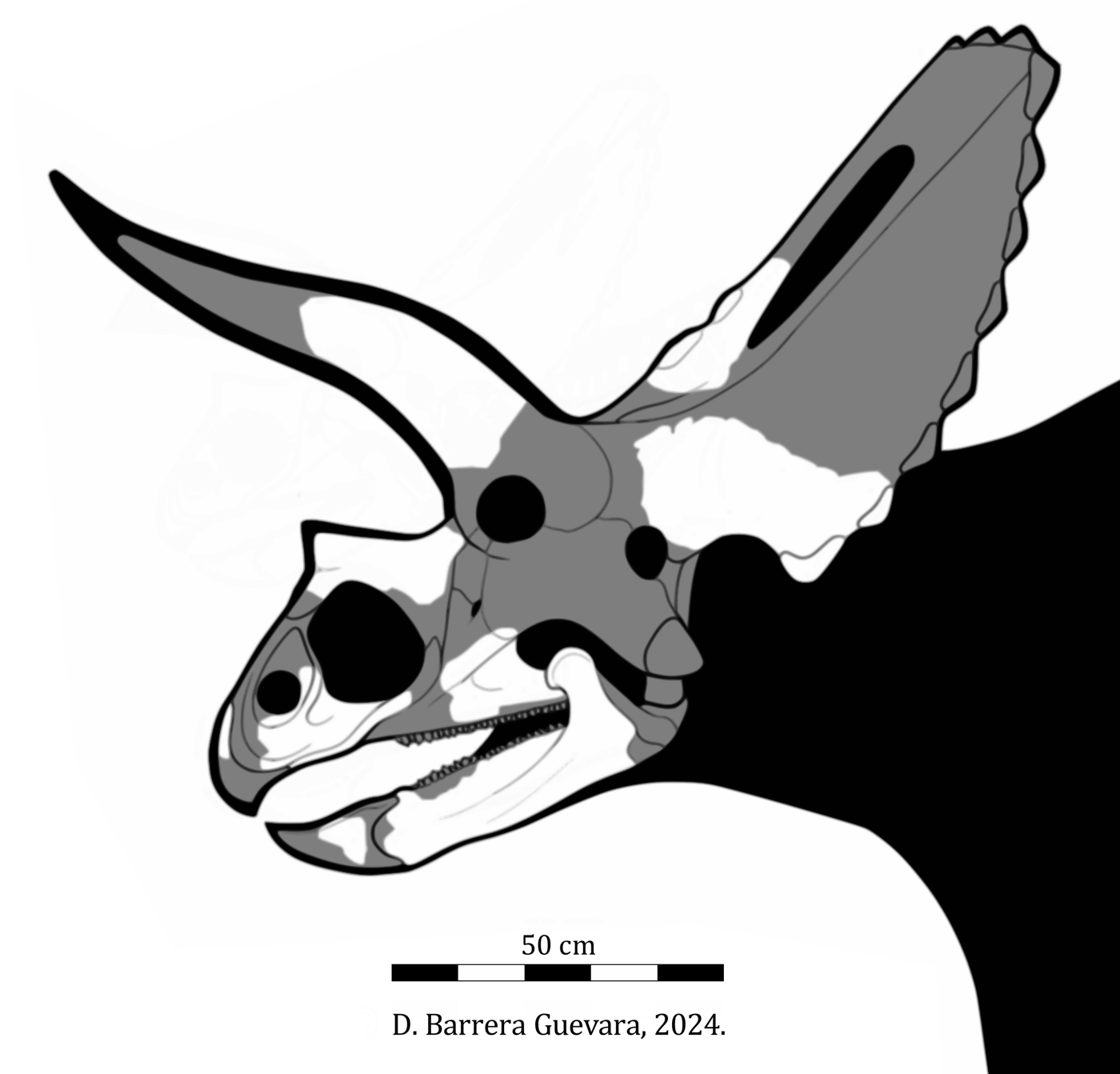
Diagram of the holotype skull with known material in white.

== Description ==
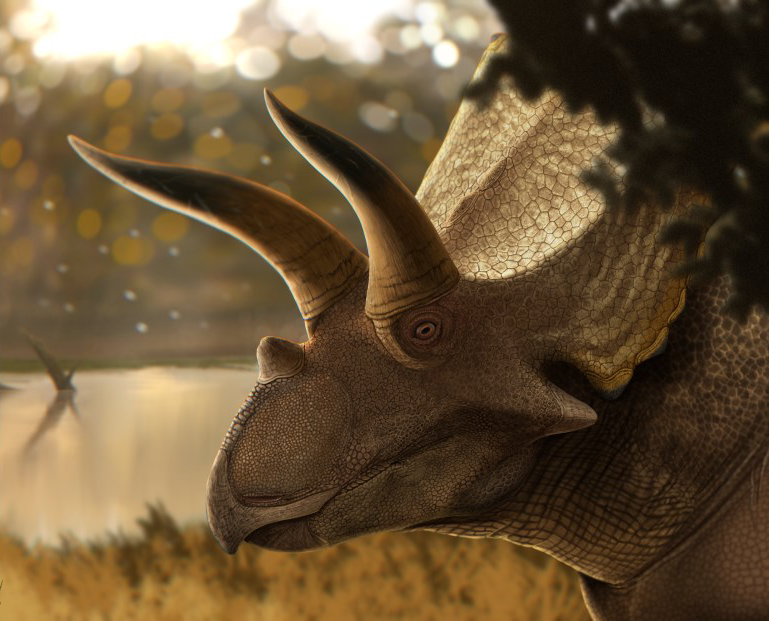
Life restoration

According to estimates given in a press release from the Natural History Museum of Utah (2010), an adult Coahuilaceratops was about 22 ft (6.7 m) long, 6 to 7 ft (1.8 to 2.1 m) tall at the shoulders and hips, with a 6 ft (1.8 m) skull and 3 to 4 ft (0.91 to 1.22 m) horns, and probably weighed about four to five tons. Gregory S. Paul estimated its length at 4 meters (13 ft) and weight at 1 metric ton (1.1 short tons) in 2016 and 1.5 metric tons (1.7 short tons) in 2024.

Although the horns of Coahuilaceratops are not completely preserved, their absolute size is comparable to the size of the horns of the largest chasmosaurines, such as Triceratops and Torosaurus. The hyperrobust morphology of the horns of Coahuilaceratops (relative lack of constriction in the distal region) is more reminiscent of large specimens of Pentaceratops than of Agujaceratops.

== Classification ==
In the phylogenetic analysis performed by the authors of the Coauilaceratops description, Loewen et al. (2010), it was found in a polytomy with Anchiceratops and Arrhinoceratops, with which it was found in a sister clade of Triceratopsini. Triceratopsins include Triceratops and all taxa closer to Triceratops than to Anchiceratops and Arrhinoceratops.

According to analysis conducted by Brown & Henderson (2015), Coahuiceratops is a sister genus of Bravoceratops within a clade that includes a number of other non-triceratopsin chasmosaurines, with Anchiceratops and Arrhinoceratops still forming a sister clade of Triceratopsini. One of the Mallon al. (2016) analyzes confirmed that Coahuilaceratops and Bravoceratops are sister taxa, but the study authors had to remove the fragmentary Bravoceratops from the analysis to obtain more meaningful results. Dalman et al. (2022) found Coahuilaceratops in a polytomy with Bravoceratops and Sierraceratops. The researchers suggested that a clade containing these three genera was endemic to southern Laramidia.

Loewen et al. (2010)

- Chasmosaurinae
  - - Chasmosaurus
    - Pentaceratops
    - Agujaceratops
  - - - Coahuilaceratops
      - Anchiceratops
      - Arrhinoceratops
    - Triceratopsini
      - - Torosaurus
        - Diceratops
      - Eotriceratops
      - Triceratops

Brown & Henderson (2015)

- Chasmosaurinae
  - - Vagaceratops
    - Kosmoceratops
  - - - - - - Chasmosaurus
            - Mojoceratops
          - Agujaceratops
        - - Utahceratops
          - Pentaceratops
      - - Bravoceratops
        - Coahuilaceratops
    - - - Anchiceratops
        - Arrhinoceratops
      - - Triceratopsini
          - - Regaliceratops
            - Eotriceratops
            - Ojoceratops
            - - Titanoceratops
              - - Nedoceratops
                - - Torosaurus
                  - Triceratops

Dalman et al. (2022)

- Chasmosaurinae
  - Mercuriceratops
  - - Judiceratops
    - - - Chasmosaurus
        - - Agujaceratops mariscalensis
          - Mojoceratops
      - - Agujaceratops mavericus
        - - - Pentaceratops aquilonius
            - Chasmosaurine from Williams Fork Formation
            - - Pentaceratops sternbergii
              - Utahceratops
              - Navajoceratops
              - Terminocavus
          - - - Kosmoceratops
              - Spiclypeus
            - - - Bisticeratops
                - Chasmosaurine from Almond Formation
              - - Anchiceratops
                - - - Bravoceratops
                    - Coahuilaceratops
                    - Sierraceratops
                  - - Arrhinoceratops
                    - Triceratopsini
                      - Titanoceratops
                      - - Eotriceratops
                        - - Torosaurus latus
                          - - Torosaurus utahensis
                            - - Regaliceratops
                              - - Ojoceratops
                                - Triceratops

== See also ==
- Timeline of ceratopsian research
