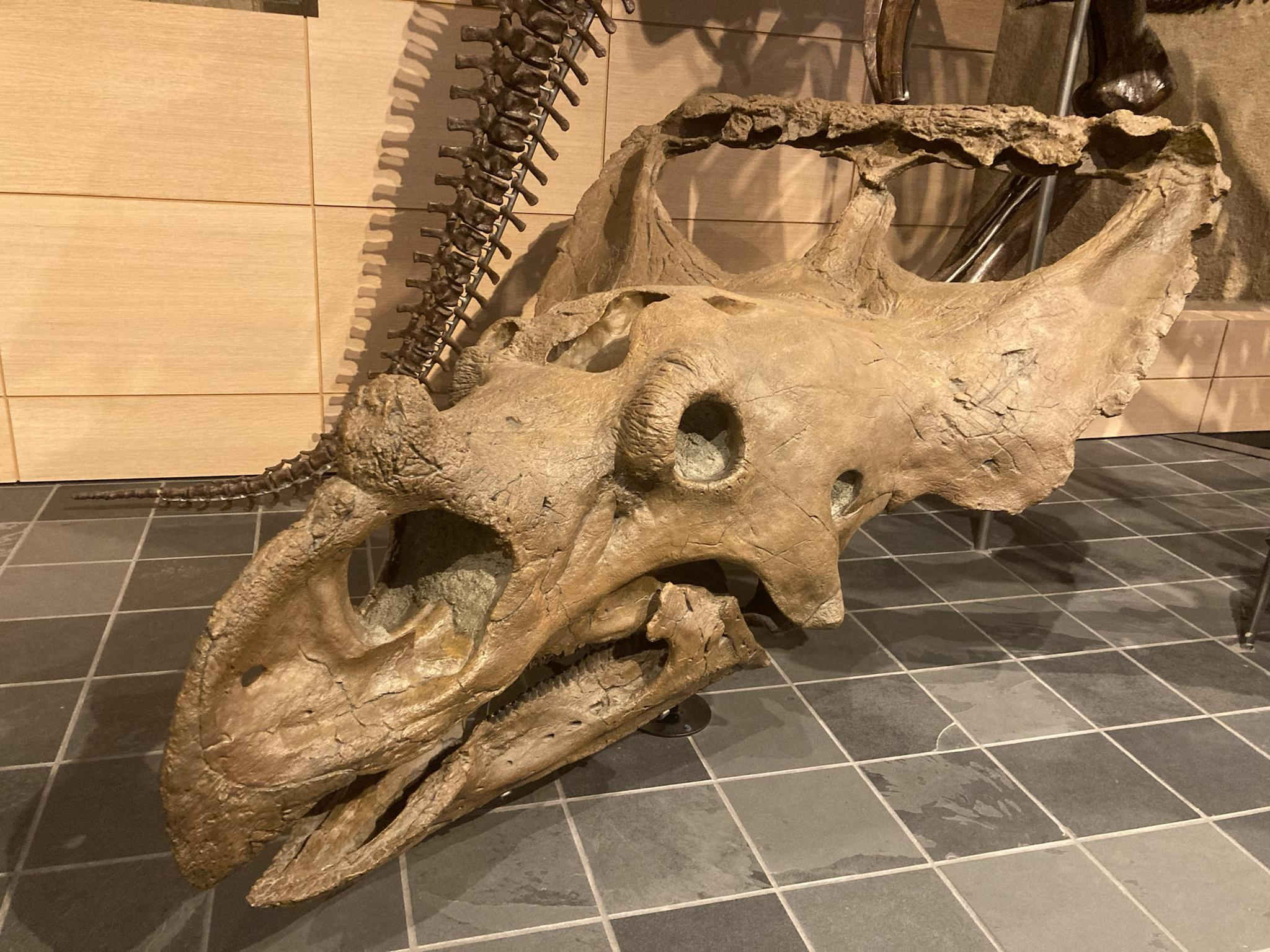
- Cast of the holotype skull, Canadian Museum of Nature

Scientific classification
- Kingdom: Animalia
- Phylum: Chordata
- Class: Reptilia
- Clade: Dinosauria
- Clade: †Ornithischia
- Clade: †Ceratopsia
- Family: †Ceratopsidae
- Subfamily: †Chasmosaurinae
- Genus: †Vagaceratops; Sampson et al., 2010
- Species: †V. irvinensis

Binomial name
- †Vagaceratops irvinensis (Holmes et al., 2001 [originally Chasmosaurus])

Synonyms
- Chasmosaurus irvinensis Holmes et al., 2001

= Vagaceratops =

Vagaceratops Temporal range: Late Cretaceous, 76.2 Ma

Extinct genus of reptiles

Vagaceratops (meaning "wandering (vagus, Latin) horned face", in reference to its close relationship with Kosmoceratops from Utah) is a genus of chasmosaurine ceratopsid dinosaur which lived during the Late Cretaceous period (late Campanian) in what is now Alberta. Its fossils have been recovered from the Upper Dinosaur Park Formation. It is sometimes included in the genus Chasmosaurus as Chasmosaurus irvinensis instead of being recognized as its own genus.

== History ==
In 2010, paleontologist Scott D. Sampson and colleagues named Vagaceratops (from the Dinosaur Park Formation, whose sole species, C. irvinensis, was formerly placed in Chasmosaurus), as well as Kosmoceratops and Utahceratops (from the Kaiparowits Formation) in the same article. These genera, which were considered unusual compared to typical members of their group, were part of a spate of ceratopsian discoveries in the early 21st century, when many new taxa were named (a 2013 study stated that half of all valid genera were named since 2003, and the decade has been called a "ceratopsid renaissance").

== Description ==
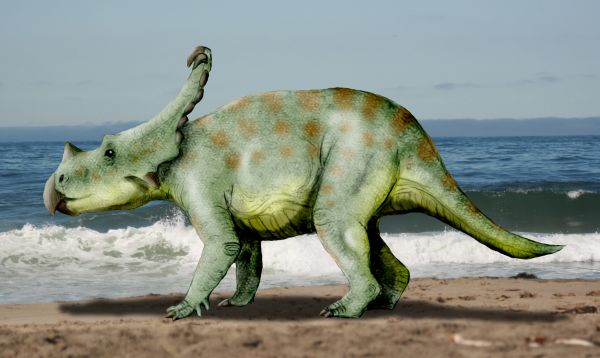
Life restoration

Vagaceratops was a medium-sized ceratopsian, reaching 4.5 m (15 ft) in length and weighing 1.2 t (1.3 short tons). It is known primarily from three fossil skulls. Although the general structure was typical of ceratopsids (i.e. a parrot-like beak, large neck frill, and nasal horn) it has some peculiarities. The skulls are characterized by a reduced supraorbital horn, brow horns that are reduced to low bosses and a larger snout compared to related animals. Vagaceratops had smaller parietal fenestrae than most ceratopsids and had a strange configuration of epoccipitals (bones surrounding the frill). It possessed ten epoccipitals, eight of which were centrally flattened, curved forward and upward and fused together to form a jagged margin along the back of the frill. The frill was shorter and more square-shaped than other chasmosaurines, being wider than it was long.

== Classification ==
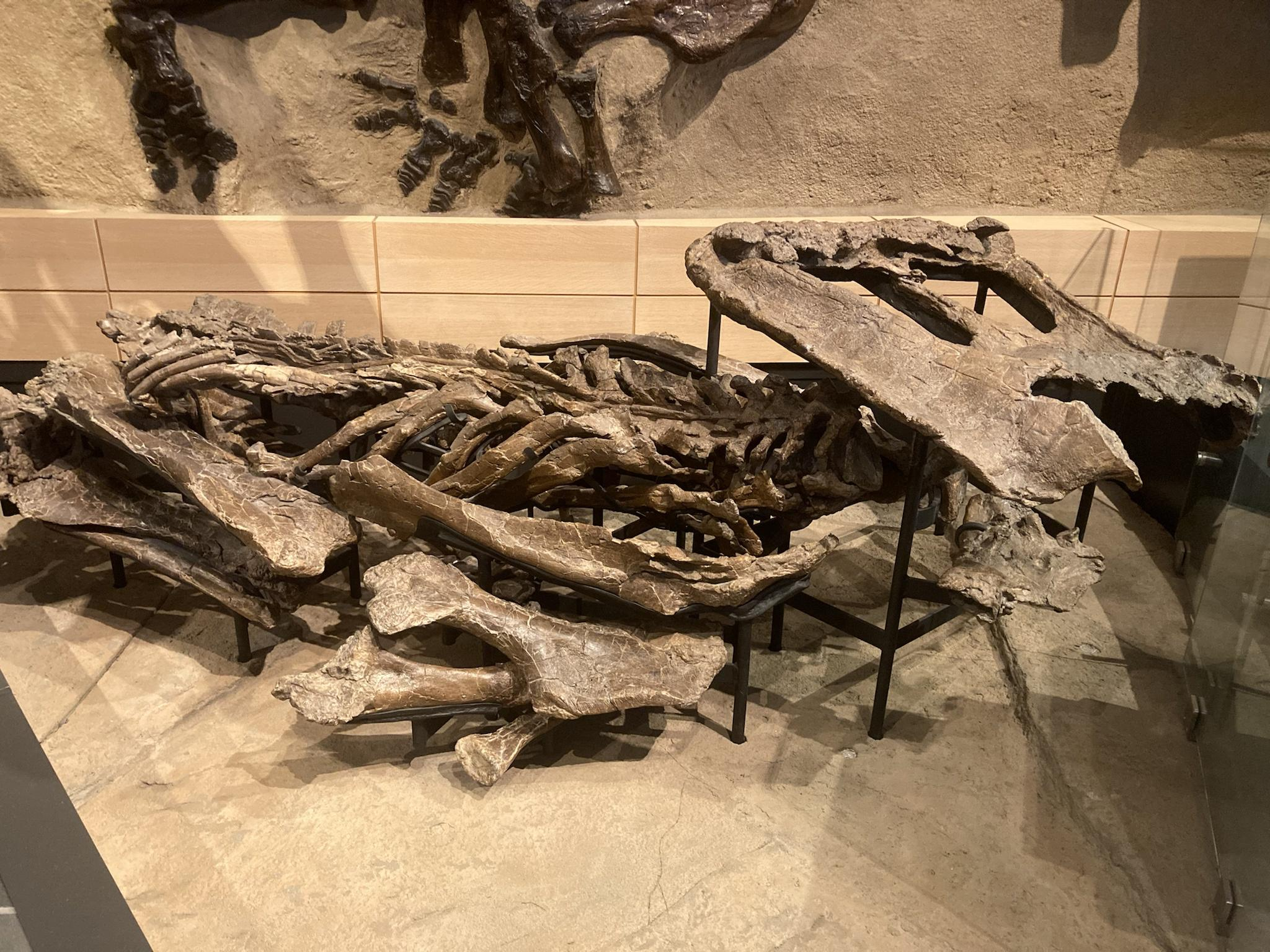
Holotype skeleton, CMN

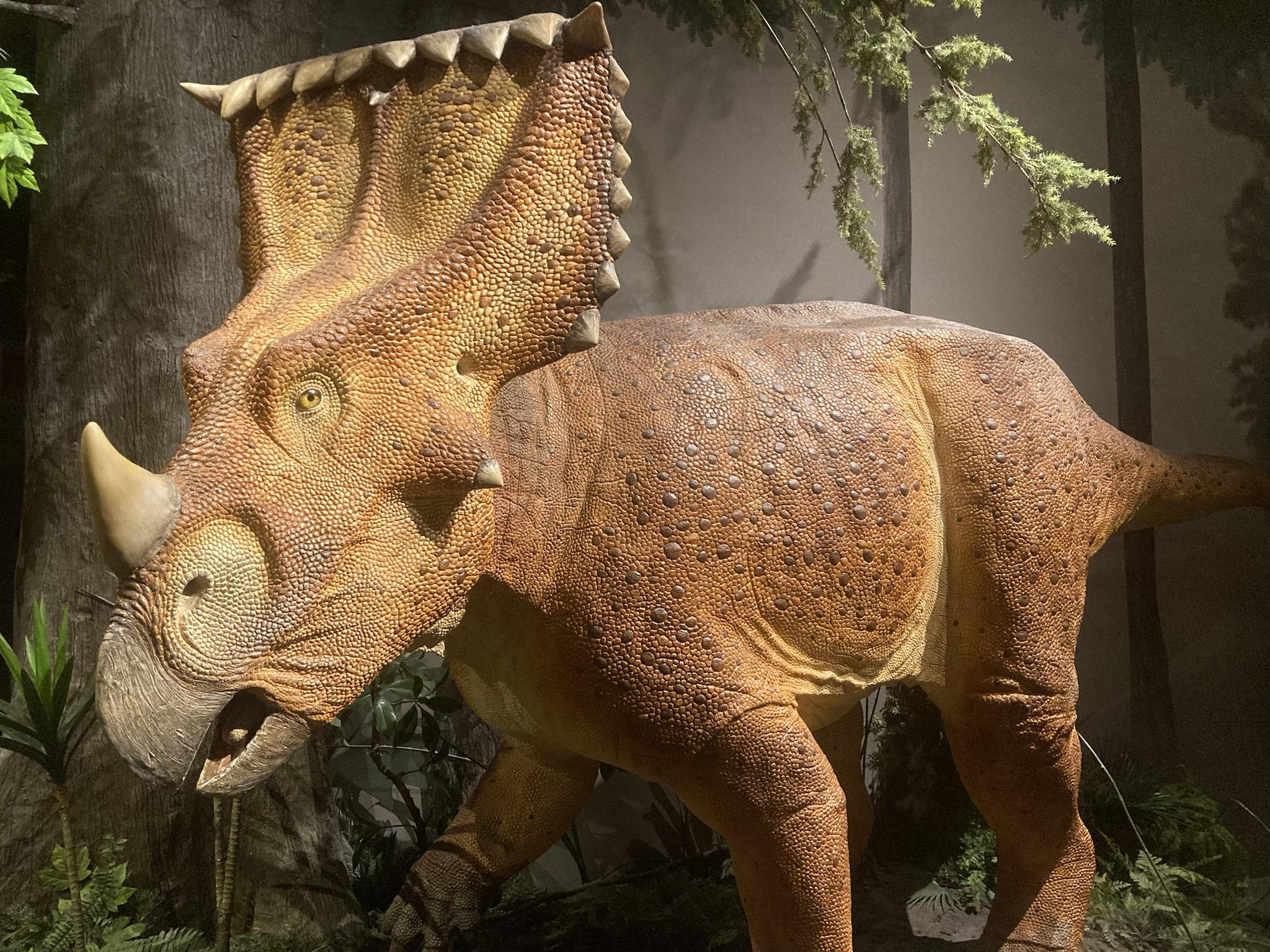
Model at CMN

Vagaceratops was named by Scott D. Sampson, Mark A. Loewen, Andrew A. Farke, Eric M. Roberts, Catherine A. Forster, Joshua A. Smith, and Alan L. Titus in 2010, and the type species is Vagaceratops irvinensis. This species was originally described as a species of Chasmosaurus (C. irvinensis) in 2001. Its relationships remain debated. Vagaceratops has variously been allied with Kosmoceratops or with Chasmosaurus.

The cladogram below is the phylogeny of the Chasmosaurinae by Brown et al. (2015):

- Ceratopsidae
  - Centrosaurinae
  - Chasmosaurinae
    - - Vagaceratops irvinensis
      - Kosmoceratops richardsoni
    - - - - - - - Chasmosaurus belli
                - Chasmosaurus russeli
              - Mojoceratops perifania
            - Agujaceratops mariscalensis
          - - Utahceratops gettyi
            - Pentaceratops sternbergii
        - - Bravoceratops polyphemus
          - Coahuilaceratops magnacuerna
      - - - Anchiceratops ornatus
          - Arrhinoceratops brachyops
        - Triceratopsini
          - Regaliceratops peterhewsi
          - Eotriceratops xerinsularis
          - Ojoceratops fowleri
          - - Titanoceratops ouranos
            - - Nedoceratops hatcheri
              - - - Torosaurus latus
                  - Torosaurus utahensis
                - - Triceratops horridus
                  - Triceratops prorsus

Recently it has been suggested that Chasmosaurinae had a deep evolutionary split between a Chasmosaurus clade and a Pentaceratops clade. Vagaceratops was hypothesized to be the last member of the Chasmosaurus clade from northern Laramidia, with the last representative of the clade being its close relative Kosmoceratops.

== See also ==
- Timeline of ceratopsian research
