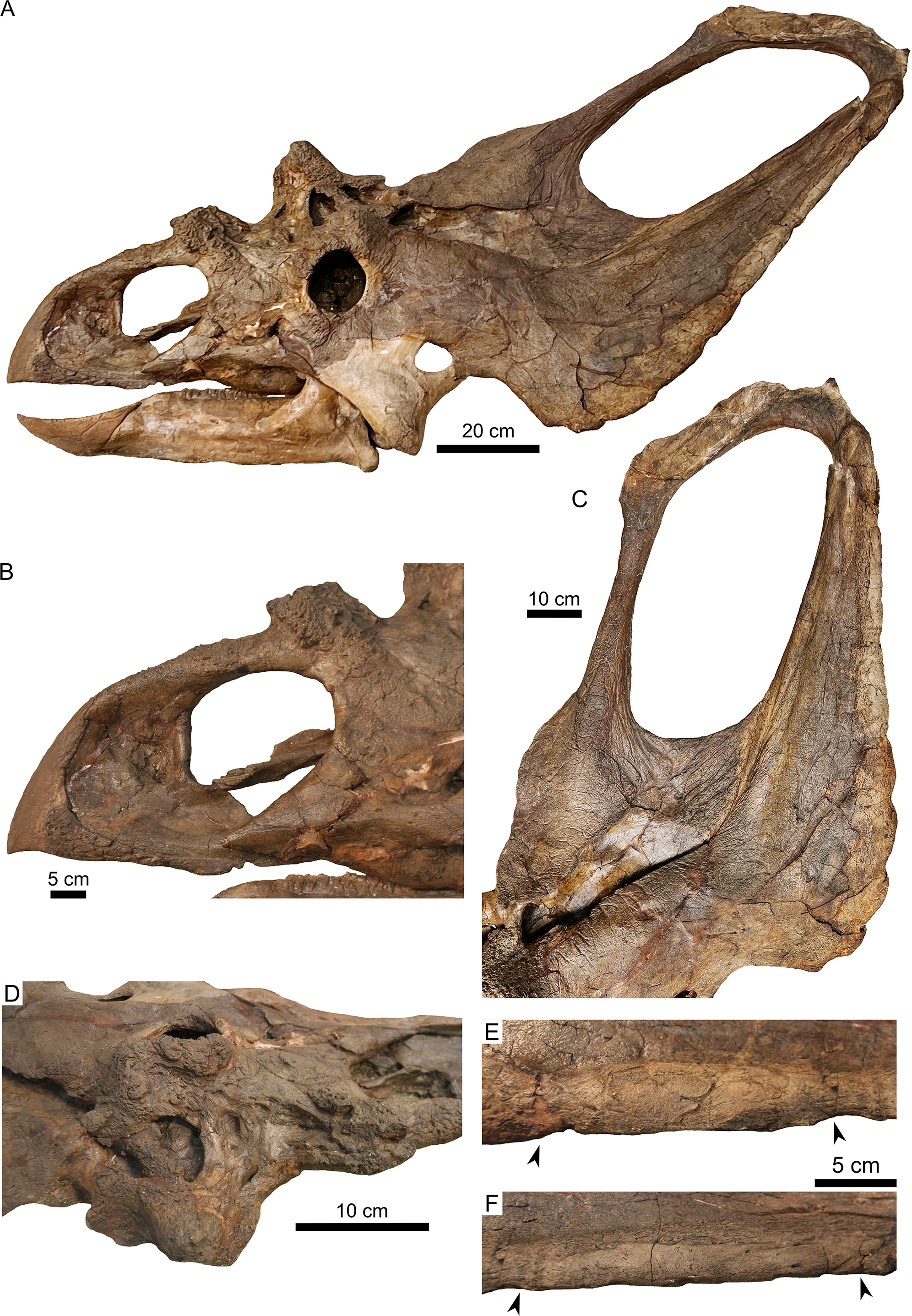
- Holotype skull in multiple view

Scientific classification
- Kingdom: Animalia
- Phylum: Chordata
- Class: Reptilia
- Clade: Dinosauria
- Clade: †Ornithischia
- Clade: †Ceratopsia
- Family: †Ceratopsidae
- Subfamily: †Chasmosaurinae
- Genus: †Cryptarcus; Holmes et al., 2026

Type species
- †Cryptarcus russelli Sternberg, 1940

= Cryptarcus =

Cryptarcus Temporal range: Late Cretaceous (Campanian), 75 Ma

Extinct genus of dinosaurs

Cryptarcus (meaning "hidden arch") is a genus of ceratopsid dinosaur found in the Dinosaur Park Formation of Alberta, dating to the middle Campanian age of the Late Cretaceous.

It was first named in 1940 by Charles Mortram Sternberg as a species of the genus Chasmosaurus and given the name Chasmosaurus russelli. The specific name honored Loris Shano Russell, who discovered the first known specimen. It was recognized as part of this genus for several subsequent decades. Throughout the early 21st century it would be considered one of two species of Chasmosaurus, alongside C. belli, and many specimens would be referred to it. However, differences between the original specimen (a nearly complete skull) and other supposed C. russelli specimens were noted, prompting reassessment. New work on the specimen was published in 2026, concluding the former was a distinct species from most of the others. Therefore, it was made the type species of the new genus Cryptarcus, with a partial parietal as the only other specimen retained within the species. While its relationships remain uncertain, it may be more closely related to animals such as Utahceratops and Pentaceratops rather than Chasmosaurus.

Amongst other traits of the skull, it can be distinguished by the deep embayment on the back of its parietal frill and the dome-shape of the ornamentation along the edge of this embayment.

== History of research ==
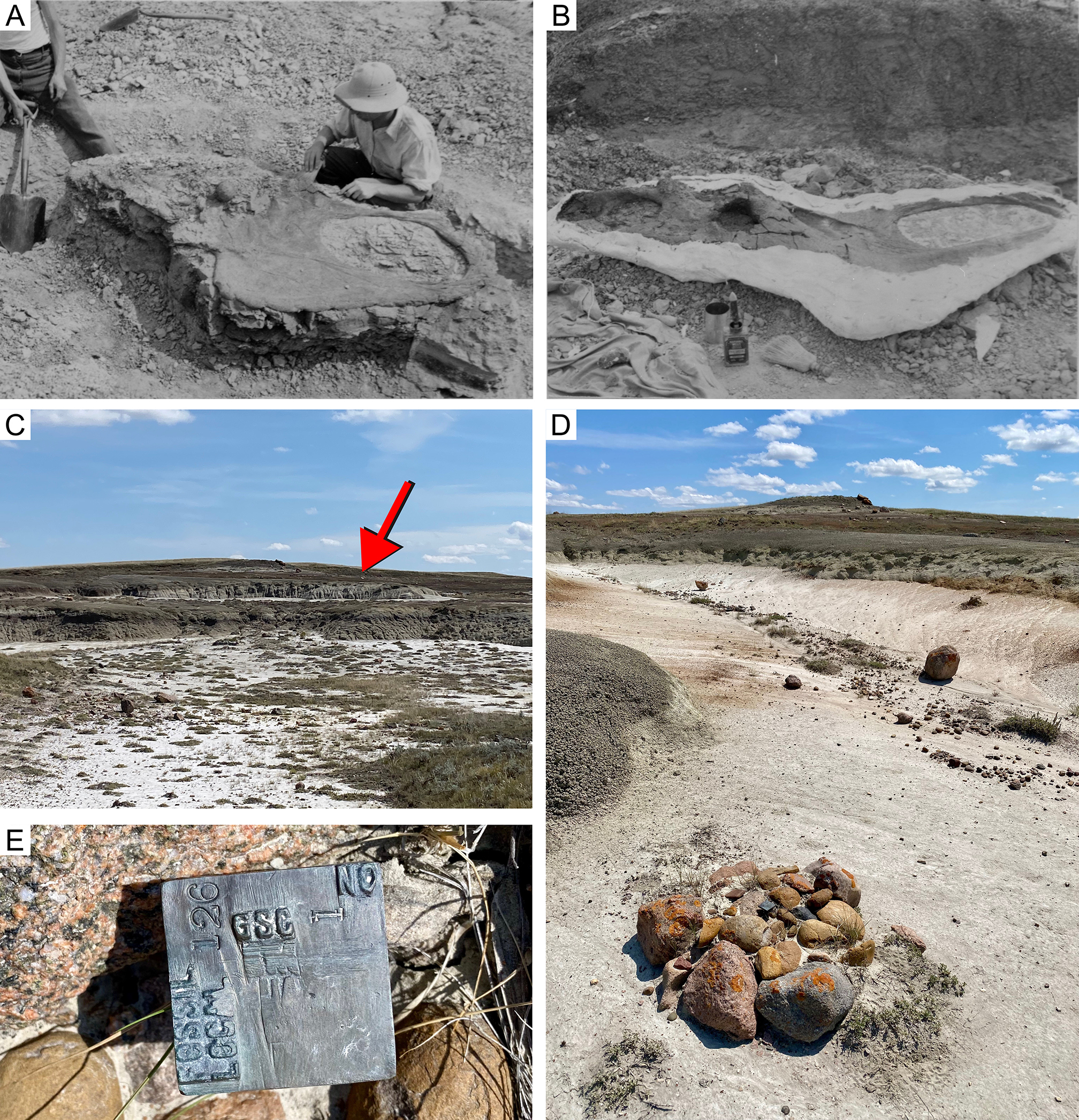
Excavation of Cryptarcus holotype (A, B), location of quarry where it was discovered (C), quarry (D), and quarry stake (E)

The specimen that would become the holotype (name-bearing specimen) of Cryptarcus was discovered in 1936 by palaeontologist Loris Shano Russell during his work for the Geological Survey of Canada. It was found near the former Onefour Research Station southeast of Manyberries, Alberta, and bears the specimen number CMNFV 8800. Most of the skull was preserved and fully articulated, but the front of the snout, the lower jaws, the right half of the frill, and various portions of the left side of the face were missing and were reconstructed with plaster after recovery of the specimen. Today, the area the specimen was recovered from is known to represent a portion of the Dinosaur Park Formation, known for its diverse assemblage of dinosaurs dating to the Campanian age of the Late Cretaceous. In 1940, Charles Mortram Sternberg interpreted the specimen as a new species of the genus Chasmosaurus, which he named Chasmosaurus russelli in honour of Russell. In addition to the holotype, Sternberg referred three other specimens to his new species, designating them as paratypes. These include CMNVP 8801, a skull lacking the frill, the fragmentary skull CMNVP 8802 (which was destroyed in 1941) and the isolated parietal CMNVP 8803. The association of these specimens with C. russelli was later doubted; the former two do not preserved the necessary anatomical traits to identify them at the species level, and are merely considered indeterminate Chasmosaurus, while CMNVP 8803 shows unusual anatomy and its identity remains uncertain.

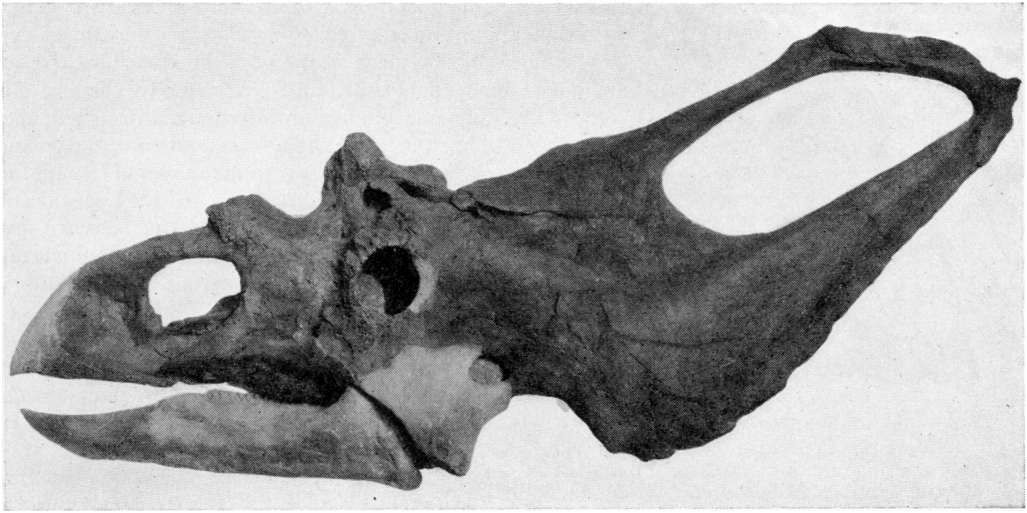
Holotype skull CMNVP 8800 as figured in the 1940 description, with missing portions reconstructed with plaster

Subsequent studies would revise the taxonomy of Chasmosaurus, for which seven different species have been named, and a two species model emerged where only C. russelli and the type species C. belli were recognized. A number of Chasmosaurus specimens were referred to C. russelli. Ostensibly, C. russelli was found in the lower layers of the Dinosaur Park Formation (making it older in geologic time), whereas those belonging to C. belli were from the upper layers of the formation. However, only one specimen other than the holotype has a definitively known stratigraphic height within the formation. Furthermore, rediscovery of the quarry where Sternberg discovered the holotype revealed it to be from a high layer of the Dinosaur Park Formation. The anatomical distinction of C. russelli and C. belli also proved troublesome, partially due to the large amount of anatomical variation seen in Chasmosaurus. Traits such as the orientation of the lateral bars of the parietal, the size of the horns, and the relative size of the epiparietal ornamentation on the frill proved to be variably distributed across the two species. As such, the division between C. russelli and C. belli became drawn based upon the angle of the median embayment, a "dip" in the shape of the top of the frill. C. russelli had embayments formed by left and right posterior parietal bars meeting at angle between 89° and 128°, whereas those of C. belli met an angle between 136° and 180°. In 2010 Nick Longrich argued many of the specimens referred to C. russelli actually represented a new genus and species, Mojoceratops perifania, but this was rejected by most other researchers. A further complication to the two species model was raised when it was noted that the holotype of C. russelli seemed to be anatomically distinct from the other specimens referred to the species.

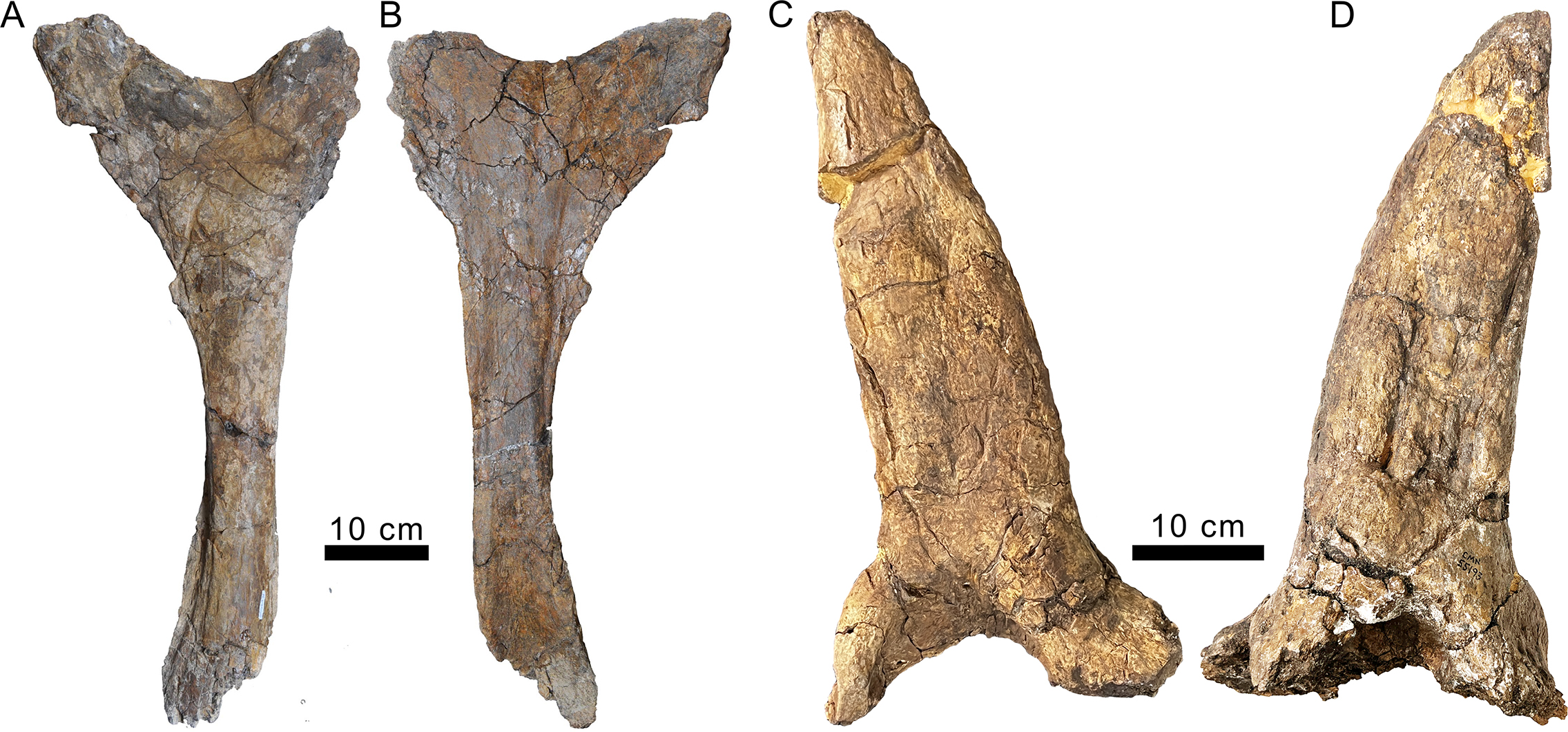
Referred partial parietal (A, B) and possibly referable horncore (C, D)

In 2026, a study by Robert B. Holmes, Jordan C. Mallon, Michael J. Ryan, and David C. Evans reevaluated the holotype and reprepared it to clarify the anatomy obscured by plaster reconstruction. Finding support for its anatomical distinction from other "Chasmosaurus russelli" specimens, they made C. russelli the type species of the new genus Cryptarcus. The generic name is derived from the Latin crypticus, meaning "hidden", and arcus, meaning "arch", referencing to the genus being "hidden" within Chasmosaurus since its initial naming as well as the anatomy of the back of the parietal. They noted that ongoing issues in the taxonomy of chasmosaurs made definitive classification difficult, and noted it was possible Cryptarcus may later become associated with another genus, the lack of any definite link to Chasmosaurus made it most responsible to give it a distinct genus. The other former specimens of C. russelli were considered unrelated, and left in the genus Chasmosaurus pending dedicated study. In addition to the holotype, they recognized the partial parietal TMP 2013.019.0038 as belonging to the species. It was discovered in 2013 in the Onefour area by Wendy Sloboda on the Sage Creek Grazing Reserve, 5.7 kilometres (3.5 miles) east of the holotype quarry and slightly higher in the Dinosaur Park Formation. A large isolated horn, CMNFV 55193, was also discovered in the Onefour area and was noted as possibly representing C. russelli as it does not conform to any other known ceratopsid from its horizon, though it contains no diagnostic characters of the holotype.

== Description ==
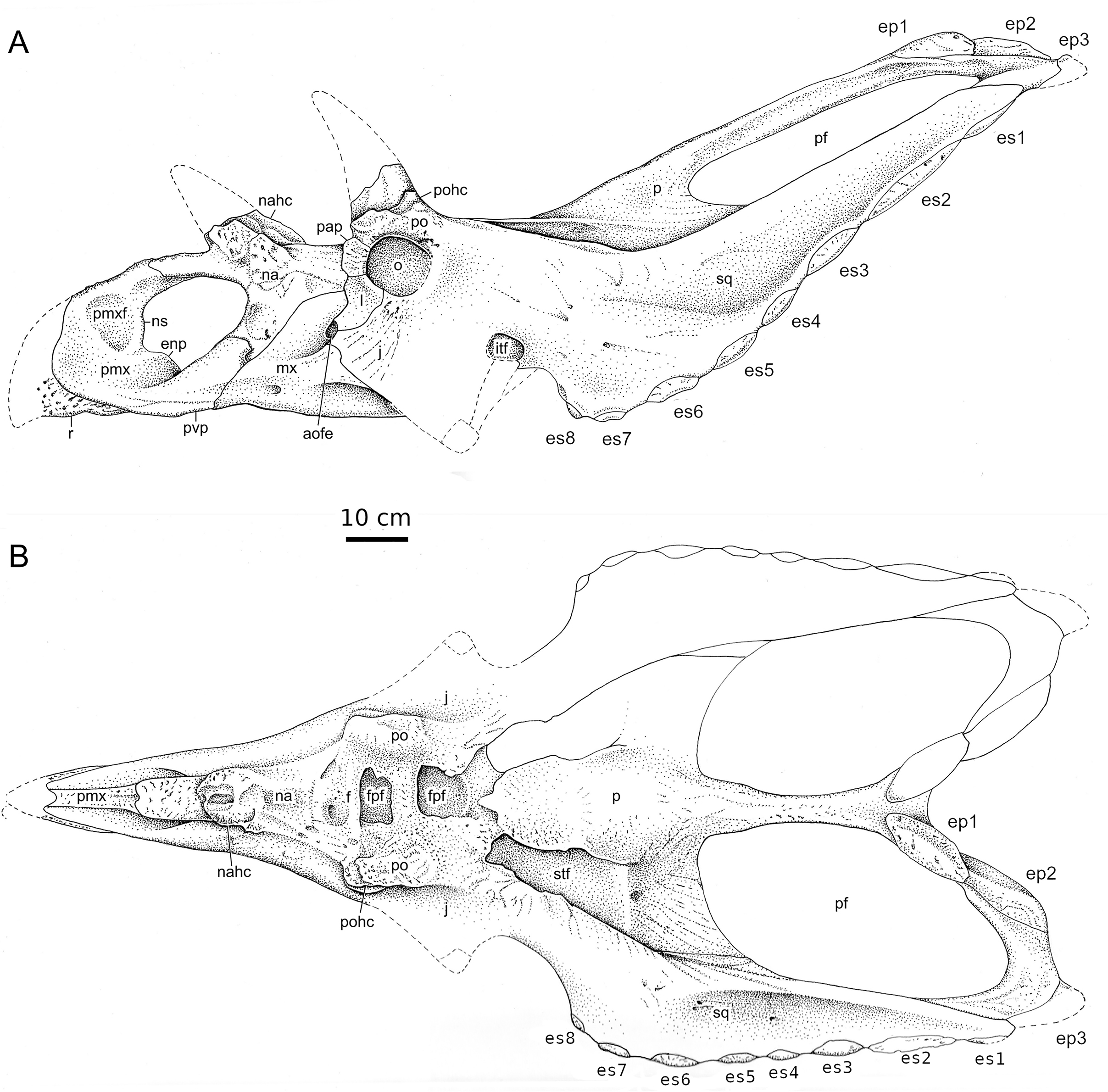
Skull reconstruction of Cryptarcus

As a chasmosaurine ceratopsid, Cryptarcus would have been a large, quadrupedal herbivore with a massive skull. Chasmosaurs possess large, narrow snouts formed by their premaxillae, ending in a large beak, and behind this were series of slicing teeth. The skull was broadly triangular, widening towards the back, and possessed three prominent horns; one above the nose (the nasal horn) and two above the eyes (the postorbital horns), in addition to hornlets on the ends of the jugal bone on each side. Projecting from the back of the head was a large, broadly rectangular frill composed of the squamosal and parietal bones; large holes between the parietals and squamosals, the parietal fenestra, lightened the frill. Along the edges of this frill are, respectively, episquamosals and epiparietals, small osteoderms that serve as ornamentation unique to each species. As is common in ceratopsids, many of the skull bones are fused together in adulthood, making them difficult to distinguish. The holotype skull of Cryptarcus is around 94 centimetres (3.08 ft) long, while the rest of the skeleton remains unknown.

The detailed anatomy of the snout in Cryptarcus is unknown due to being largely unpreserved. Nonetheless, its broad anatomy appears to be similar to that of other ceratopsids. Behind the beak, the front of the skull is formed by the premaxilla. That of Cryptarcus is distinguished by the spatulate shape of the posteroventral process of the premaxilla - the portion that projects along the bottom of the naris, the large opening for the nostrils. In Cryptarcus, this process covers the portion of the nasal bone underneath the naris, whereas in Chasmosaurus the nasal bone is exposed to the outside. Located about the naris was a short and broad-based nasal horn. Its position over the back of the naris, similar to Kosmoceratops and some Chasmosaurus specimens, as opposed to fully over the naris as in more derived ceratopsids like Pentaceratops and Triceratops or fully behind the naris as in Utahceratops. Further back, located over the eyes, were the postorbital horns, one on each side. Though preserved as small stumps in the holotype (which may be pathological), they may have been quite long in life. Other chasmosaurs show signs of reasorbing their horns with age; they're large in young individuals and reduce in size with advanced age. Underneath these horns, a bone in front of the eye known as the palpebral bears a prominent rugosity unique to Cryptarcus. The region behind the eye was formed by the jugal bone, which bore a small horn similar to other ceratopsids. Its broad shape would have covered the end of the toothrow of the upper jaw as viewed from the side, similar to Chasmosaurus but unlike most other chasmosaurs. Between the eyes was a large depression known as the frontoparietal fontanelle. This is a typical feature of ceratopsids, but is especially wide in the holotype of Cryptarcus, and possesses a unique bridge of bone between the postorbital bones on either side, possibly due to the old age of the individual rather than distinguishing the species.

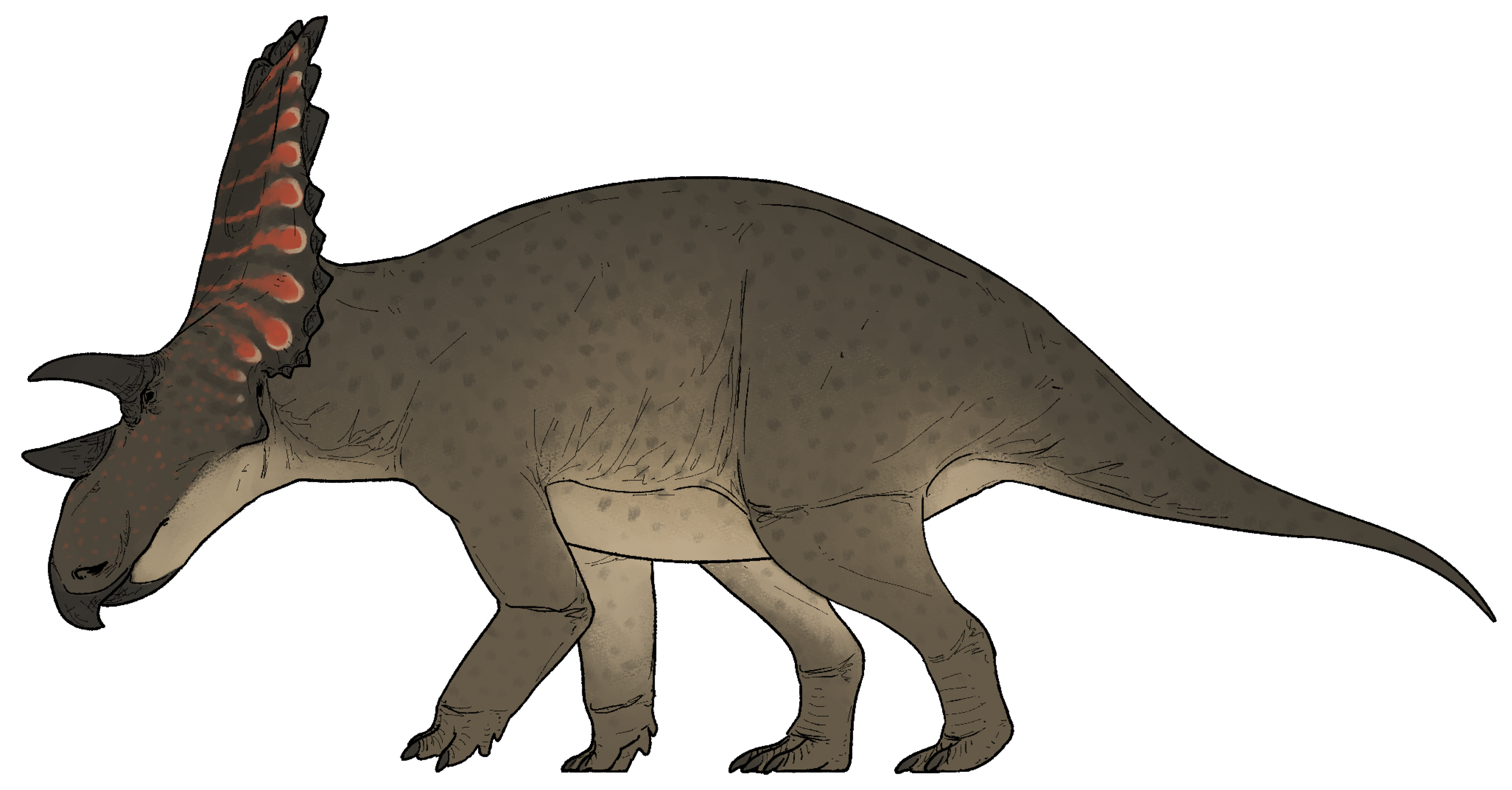
Life restoration of Cryptarcus

The parietosquamosal frill measures around 120% of the length of the rest of the skull. The base of the frill was longer than the end (as in all ceratopsids), but due to the more intense curvature at the base, the disparity in width is not apparent from the front and both appear similar in length, creating a rectangular profile. This is similar to the frill proportions of Pentaceratops, Utahceratops, and Agujaceratops, but unlike the frill of Chasmosaurus which appears to widen posteriorly. The pair of parietal fenestrae are large and oval in shape. The sides of the frill are formed by a squamosal on each side, which have an elongate scalene triangle shape. Similar to Chasmosaurus, the outside edge is essentially straight, unlike the curved shape seen in Agujaceratops. The squamosals only curve upwards at their base, similar to Chasmosaurus, creating a frill that projects less far upwards than in Agujaceratops where the frill is more concave and upright in orientation. The two parietal fenestra are separated by the median parietal bar, which has a square cross-section contrasting that of other chasmosaurs where the bar is typically more wide than deep. It is narrowest at its midpoint, as opposed to near the back of the bar as in most Chasmosaurus. The posterior parietal bars form the back of the frill, and are narrow as in other basal chasmosaurs, unlike the broadened parietal bars of later genera like Anchiceratops and Terminocavus. The centre of the back of the frill, where the bars of the parietal meet, is inset into an embayment. This gives the overall a frill a distinctive M-shape outline, with arches on the left and right side. While a similar morphology is seen in specimens of Chasmosaurus formerly referred to C. russelli, none arch so extremely as in true Cryptarcus.

Along the edges of the frill, the episquamosals and epiparietals serve as ornamentation that help distinguish each species of ceratopsid. Each squamosal bears eight episquamosals. They are smallest along the base of the squamosal, and grow significantly in size as the progress upward. The second episquamosal (second from the top) is especially large, and followed by a distinctly smaller eighth episquamosal. This arrangement is unique among chasmosaurs; in all other species they have a consistent size or uniformly get larger as they progress up the frill. Only three epiparietals are present. The first and second epiparietals were located within the central embayment and are aberrant in that they are rooted on the front surface of the frill, rather than projecting along its edge. They are oval, dome-shaped, and prominently keeled, unlike those of any other chasmosaurs. The first is angled parallel to the section of parietal it is rooted on, whereas the second is slightly angled inwards. Both are so closely spaced that the border of epiparietal one and two is difficult to distinguish, and the first epiparietals are placed so deeply in the median embayment that the left and right first epiparietals nearly contact each other. Contrastingly, there is a significant gap between the second and third epiparietal, contrasting Chasmosaurus where the epiparietals are evenly spaced and more resembling the arrangement of Pentaceratops and its relatives. Though poorly preserved, the third epiparietals is rooted along the edge of the parietal near the point of contact with the squamosal, and has a more typical flat and plate-like form rather than being domed. What shape the complete element would have formed is unclear, though based on related animals it may have been triangular or D-shaped.

== Classification ==
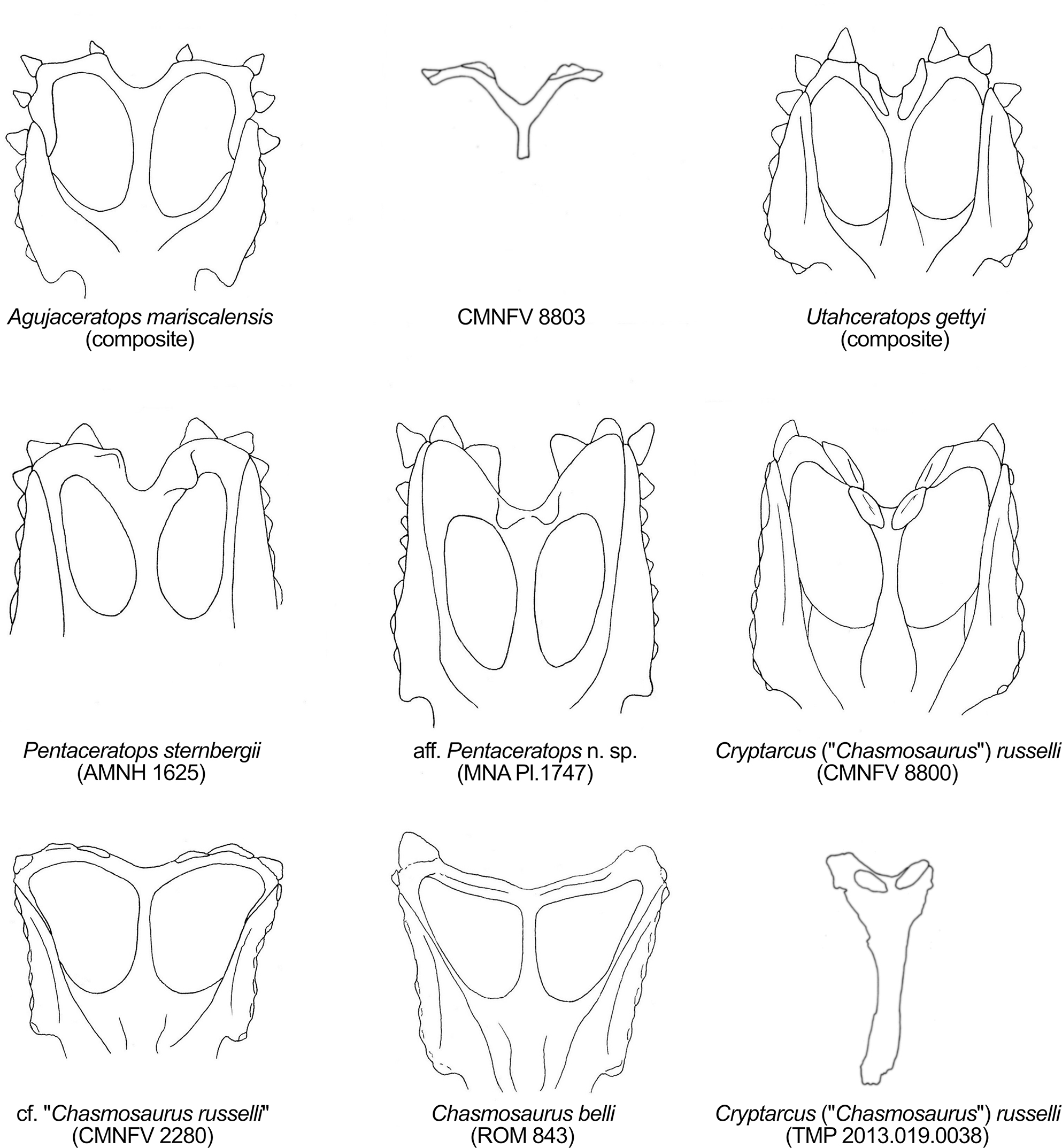
Frill anatomy of various chasmosaurines

Revision of the material and taxonomy of Cryptarcus found that CMN 8800 was not able to be resolved as closer to either Chasmosaurus or Pentaceratops, with alternative methodologies finding both options possible. Anatomical features that were believed to unite Cryptarcus with Chasmosaurus (low facial profile, rear maxilla hidden below jugal, thin parietal strut) can also be seen among other chasmosaurines and can be subject to taphonomic distortion. The lack of a postorbital horncore, shared with Chasmosaurus, may also be subject to resorption during growth and therefore not a unique feature. Phylogenetic results following the reassessment of Holmes and colleagues (2026) are shown below, based on Iterations 1 and 2 (no weighting). Iterations 3 and 5 (k = 3) recovered Cryptarcus in an unresolved polytomy with Agujaceratops spp., more closely related to Pentaceratops than Chasmosaurus, while Iterations 4 and 6 (k = 12) recovered it closer to Chasmosaurus than Pentaceratops.

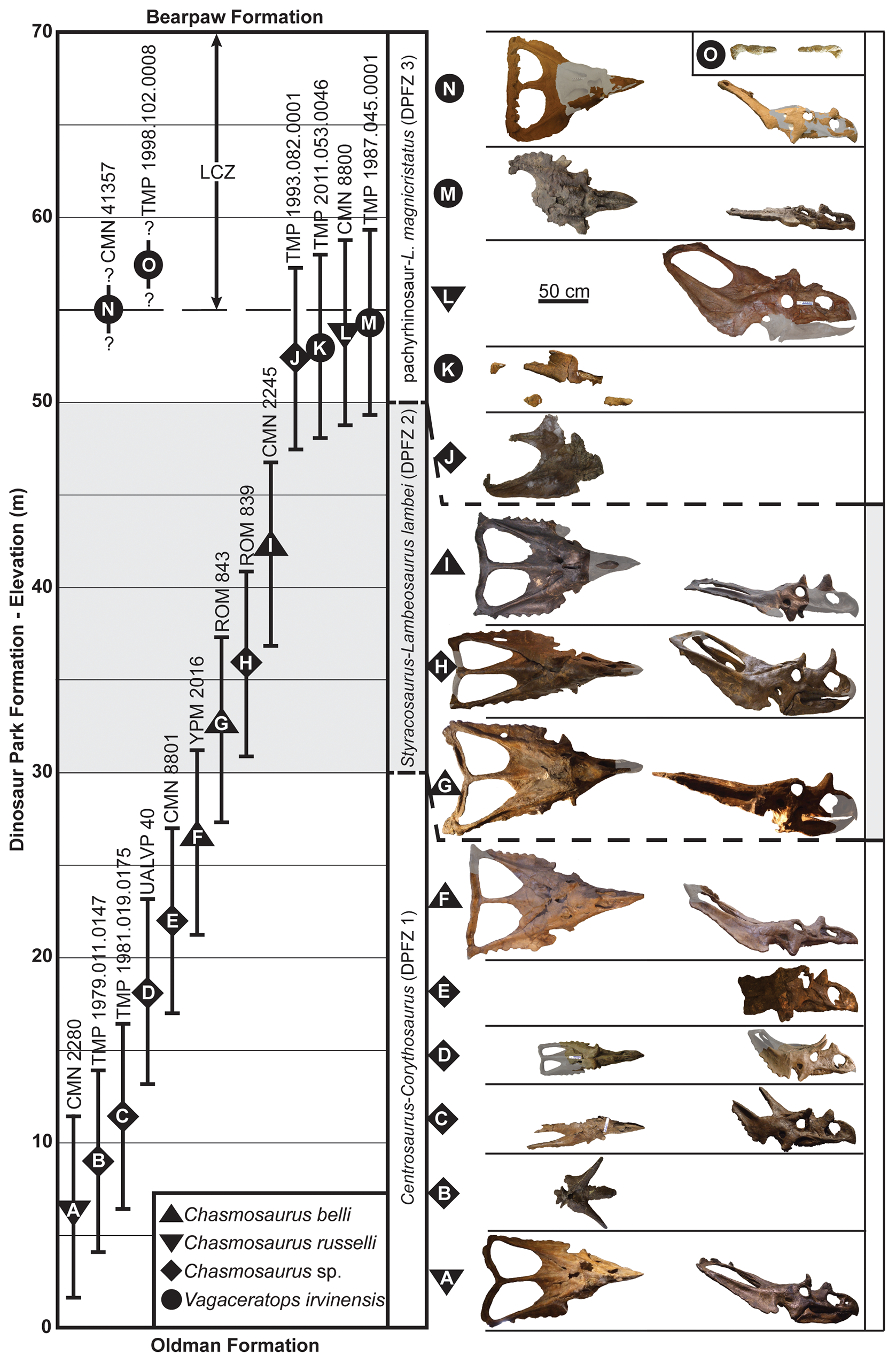
Chasmosaurine skulls from the Dinosaur Park Formation including CMN 8800 and specimens of Chasmosaurus

- Chasmosaurinae
  - Mercuriceratops
  - - Regaliceratops
    - - - Anchiceratops
        - - Arrhinoceratops
          - - Eotriceratops
            - - Torosaurus spp.
              - Triceratops spp.
      - - Kosmoceratops
        - - Vagaceratops
          - - Spiclypeus
            - - Agujaceratops mariscalensis
              - - Cryptarcus
                - - Chasmosaurus belli
                  - "Mojoceratops perifania"
                - - Navajoceratops
                  - - Agujaceratops mavericus
                    - - Utahceratops
                      - Pentaceratops
