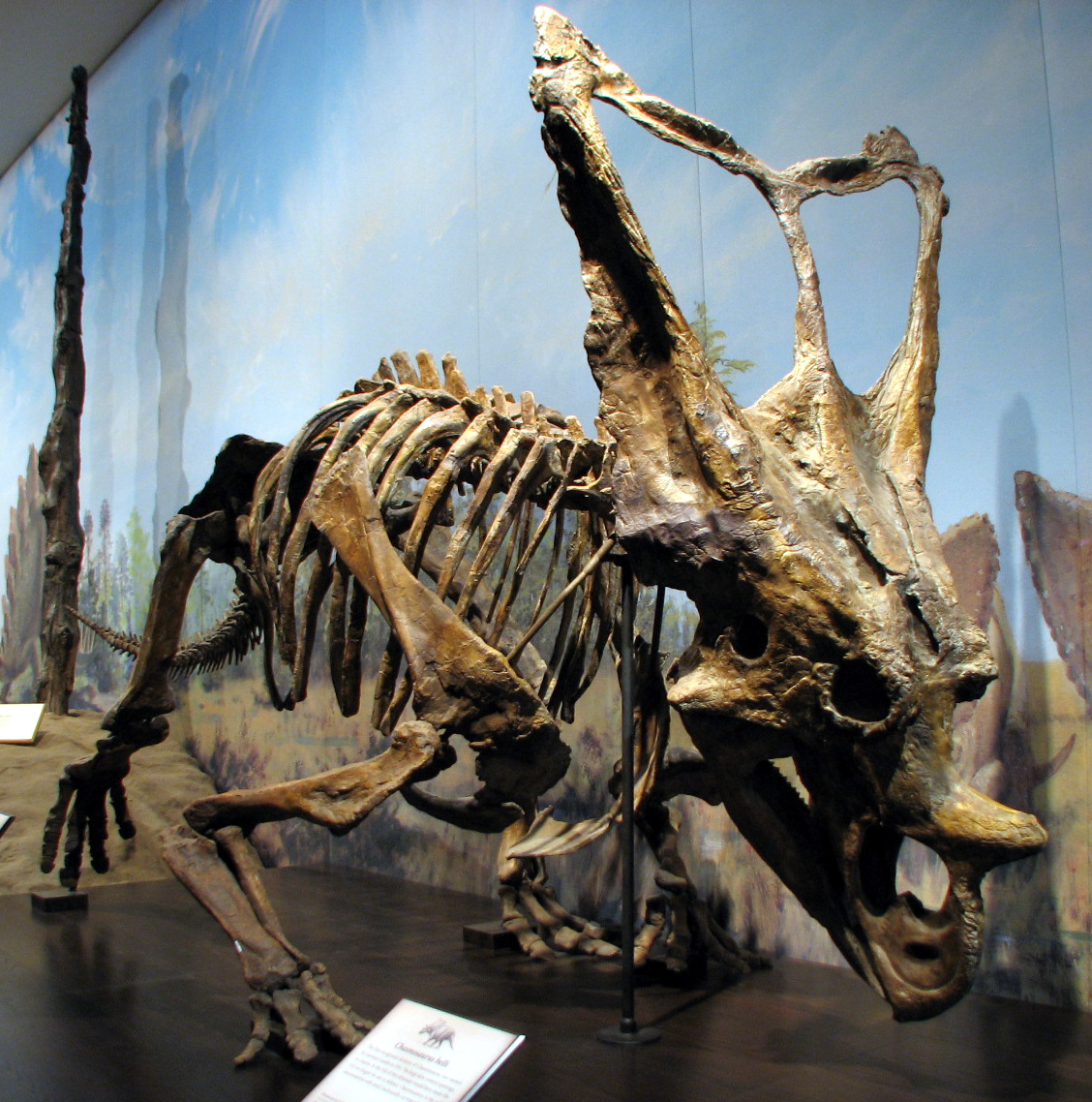
- Chasmosaurus belli skeleton, Royal Tyrrell Museum of Palaeontology

Scientific classification
- Kingdom: Animalia
- Phylum: Chordata
- Class: Reptilia
- Clade: Dinosauria
- Clade: †Ornithischia
- Clade: †Ceratopsia
- Family: †Ceratopsidae
- Subfamily: †Chasmosaurinae; Lambe, 1915

Type species
- †Chasmosaurus belli Lambe, 1902

Subgroups
- †Agujaceratops; †Anchiceratops; †Arrhinoceratops; †Bisticeratops; †Bravoceratops; †Chasmosaurus; †Coahuilaceratops; †Cryptarcus; †Judiceratops; †Kosmoceratops; †Mercuriceratops; †Navajoceratops; †Pentaceratops; †Sierraceratops; †Spiclypeus; †Terminocavus; †Titanoceratops?; †Utahceratops; †Vagaceratops; †Triceratopsini Marsh, 1889; †Eotriceratops; †Nedoceratops; †Ojoceratops; †Regaliceratops; †Tatankaceratops; †Titanoceratops?; †Torosaurus; †Triceratops

Synonyms
- Ceratopsinae? Marsh, 1888 sensu Abel, 1919; Eoceratopsinae Lambe, 1915

= Chasmosaurinae =

Chasmosaurines Temporal range: Late Cretaceous, 78–66 Ma

Extinct subfamily of dinosaurs

Chasmosaurinae is a subfamily of ceratopsid dinosaurs. They were one of the most successful groups of herbivores of their time. Chasmosaurines appeared in the early Campanian, and became extinct, along with all other non-avian dinosaurs, during the Cretaceous–Paleogene extinction event. Broadly, the most distinguishing features of chasmosaurines are prominent brow horns and long frills lacking long spines; centrosaurines generally had short brow horns and relatively shorter frills, and often had long spines projecting from their frills.

Chasmosaurines evolved in western North America (Laramidia). They are currently known definitively from rocks in western Canada, the western United States, and northern Mexico. They were highly diverse and among the most species-rich groups of dinosaurs, with new species frequently described. This high diversity of named species is likely a result of the frill. The distinctive shape of the frill with the hornlets on its edges (epoccipitals) make it possible to recognize species from incomplete or fragmentary remains.

== Classification ==
Chasmosaurinae is defined officially in the PhyloCode by Daniel Madzia and colleagues in 2021 as "the largest clade containing Chasmosaurus belli and Triceratops horridus, but not Centrosaurus apertus". Below is the result of a phylogenetic analysis by Mallon et al., following the traditional epiparietal homology scheme from their description of Spiclypeus shipporum. Bravoceratops and Eotriceratops were removed because it was found that they decrease resolution in the analysis because of the authors' new interpretation of epiparietal configurations. Regaliceratops was not resolved as a member of the Triceratopsini.

- Chasmosaurinae
  - - - - - - - Kosmoceratops richardsoni
              - Vagaceratops irvinensis
            - Spiclypeus shipporum
          - Pentaceratops sternbergii
        - Utahceratops gettyi
      - - Agujaceratops mariscalensis
        - - Mojoceratops perifania
          - - Chasmosaurus belli
            - Chasmosaurus russelli
    - Coahuilaceratops magnacuerna
  - - Anchiceratops ornatus
    - Regaliceratops peterhewsi
    - - Arrhinoceratops brachyops
      - - Triceratopsini
          - - Ojoceratops fowleri
            - Titanoceratops ouranos
            - Nedoceratops hatcheri
            - Torosaurus latus
            - "Torosaurus" utahensis
            - - Triceratops prorsus
              - Triceratops horridus

The findings of a phylogenetic study done by Fowler and Freedman in 2020 are given below. The authors proposed that two distinct and roughly contemporaneous lineages of chasmosaurines existed in the late Cretaceous: a northern "Chasmosaurus" lineage with a heart-shaped frill margin that flattens and curls over onto itself, and a southern "Pentaceratops" lineage with a pinched shut indentation in the heart-shaped frill margin. According to the cladogram below, the Triceratopsini may have derived from this later lineage. To improve resolution, certain species based on partial or immature remains (Bravoceratops and Agujaceratops) were excluded, as in the Mallon et al. study above. While this new study did not yield a single "Pentaceratops lineage," was not recovered by this revised analysis as they had predicted based on frill shape, the authors speculated that this may be due to some specimens included as Pentaceratops sternbergii being misclassified, and possibly referable to other species pending further study. The authors also noted that some newer species included in the previous analysis by Mallon et al. (Spiclypeus, Regaliceratops, etc.) had yet to be coded into their revised dataset.

- Chasmosaurinae
  - - - Chasmosaurus russelli
      - Chasmosaurus belli
    - - Vagaceratops irvinensis
      - Kosmoceratops richardsoni
  - - - - Utahceratops gettyi
        - Pentaceratops sternbergii
      - Coahuilaceratops magnacuerna
    - - Navajoceratops sullivani
      - - Terminocavus sealeyi
        - - Anchiceratops ornatus
          - - Arrhinoceratops brachyops
            - Triceratopsini

Triceratopsini was named by Nicholas R. Longrich in 2011 for the description of Titanoceratops, which he defined as "all species closer to Triceratops horridus than to Anchiceratops ornatus or Arrhinoceratops brachyops". Triceratopsins were the largest of the chasmosaurines; suggesting that gigantism had evolved in the Ceratopsidae once. In addition there is an evolutionary trend in the solidification of the frills, the most extreme being in Triceratops.

== See also ==
- Timeline of ceratopsian research
