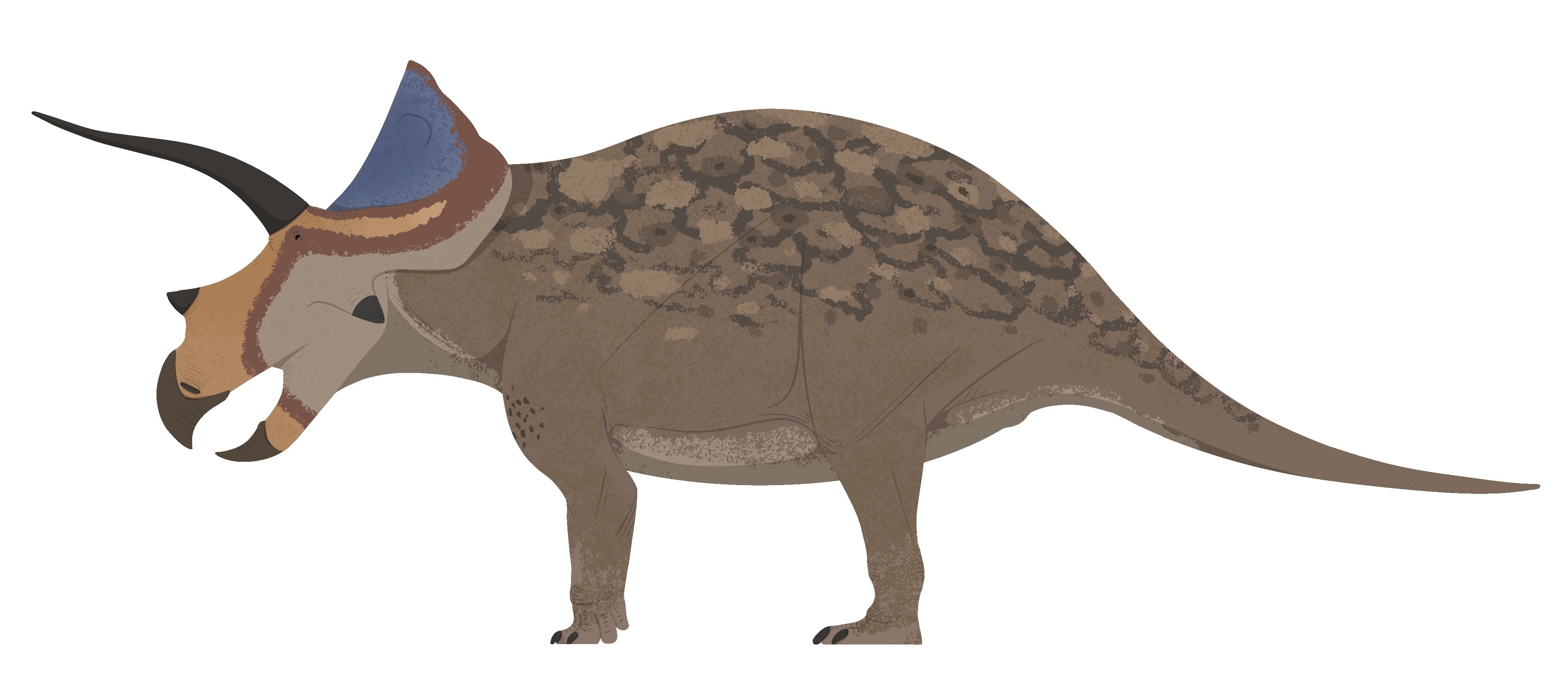
- Speculative life restoration

Scientific classification
- Kingdom: Animalia
- Phylum: Chordata
- Class: Reptilia
- Clade: Dinosauria
- Clade: †Ornithischia
- Clade: †Ceratopsia
- Family: †Ceratopsidae
- Subfamily: †Chasmosaurinae
- Tribe: †Triceratopsini
- Genus: †Ojoceratops; Sullivan & Lucas, 2010

Type species
- †Ojoceratops fowleri Sullivan & Lucas, 2010

= Ojoceratops =

Ojoceratops Temporal range: Late Cretaceous, 66.5 Ma

Extinct genus of dinosaurs

Ojoceratops ( meaning "Ojo Alamo horned face") is a genus of ceratopsian dinosaur which lived in what is now New Mexico, United States. Ojoceratops fossils have been recovered from strata of the Ojo Alamo Formation (Naashoibito Member), dating to the late Cretaceous period (late Maastrichtian age, 66 million years ago). The type species is Ojoceratops fowleri. Ojoceratops is estimated to have been 9 metres (30 ft) in length.

== Classification ==
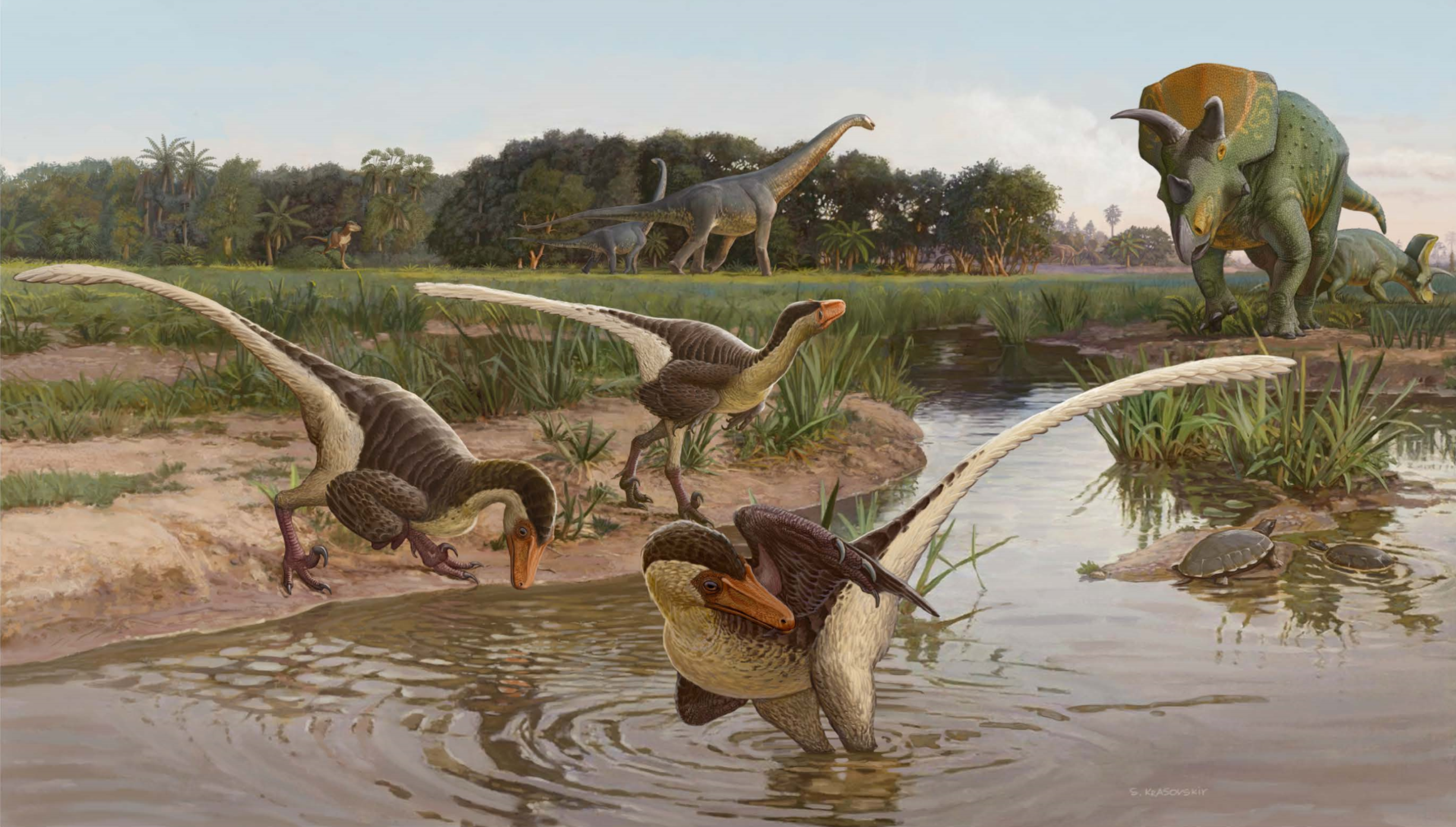
Restoration of Ojoceratops (right) in its environment

It is very similar to its close relative Triceratops, though it is from an earlier time period and has a more squared-off frill. Nick Longrich, in 2011, noted that the squared-off frill is also found in some true Triceratops specimens and that Ojoceratops is probably a junior synonym of Triceratops, while Holtz (2010) noted that it is probably ancestral to Triceratops and possibly synonymous with the contemporary Eotriceratops. However, Jasinski et al. (2011) argued that the genus is valid on the basis of other diagnostic features not recognized by Longrich (2011), including the parietal bar not seen in any Triceratops specimens, the wide arched squamosal, enlarged base, etc. Maiorino et al. (2015) also considered Ojoceratops as a valid taxon in their phylogenetic analysis. Cladistic analyses revealed that Regaliceratops is in a polytomy with Ojoceratops and Eotriceratops.

== See also ==
- Timeline of ceratopsian research
