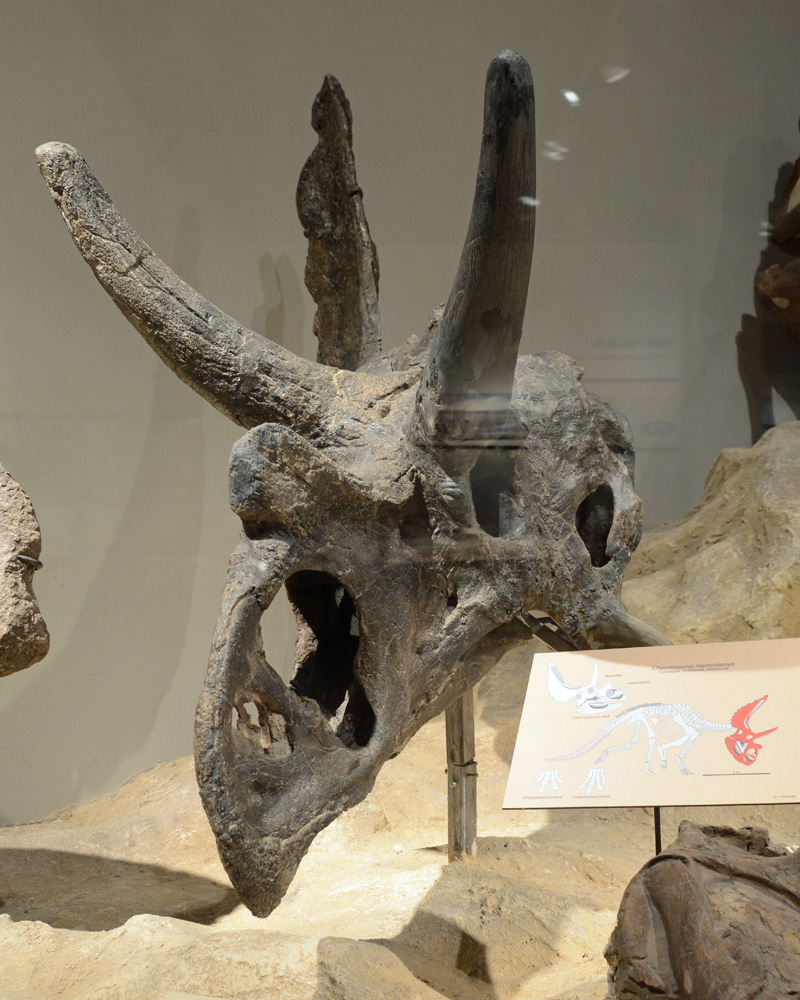
- Partial holotype skull of A. mavericus, Texas Science & Natural History Museum

Scientific classification
- Kingdom: Animalia
- Phylum: Chordata
- Class: Reptilia
- Clade: Dinosauria
- Clade: †Ornithischia
- Clade: †Ceratopsia
- Family: †Ceratopsidae
- Subfamily: †Chasmosaurinae
- Genus: †Agujaceratops; Lucas, Sullivan & Hunt, 2006

Type species
- †Agujaceratops mariscalensis (Lehman, 1989)

Species
- A. mariscalensis (Lehman, 1989); A. mavericus Lehman et al., 2016

Synonyms
- Chasmosaurus mariscalensis Lehman, 1989

= Agujaceratops =

Agujaceratops Temporal range: Late Cretaceous, 77 Ma

Extinct genus of dinosaurs

Agujaceratops (meaning "horned face from Aguja") is a genus of chasmosaurine ceratopsid dinosaur from the Late Cretaceous (Campanian) of western Texas. Two species are known: A. mariscalensis and A. mavericus, both recovered from the Aguja Formation.

== Discovery and species ==
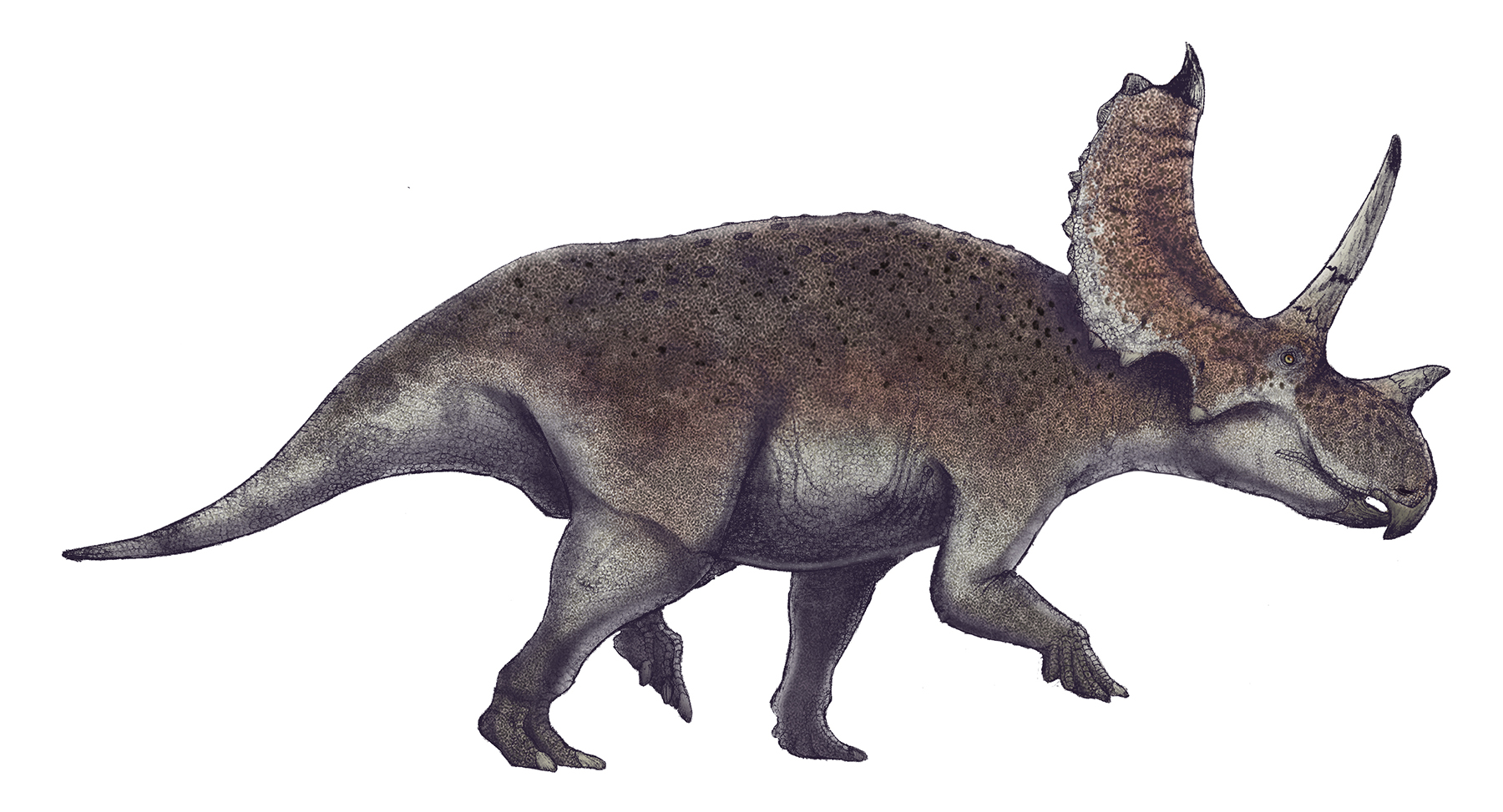
Restoration of Agujaceratops mariscalensis

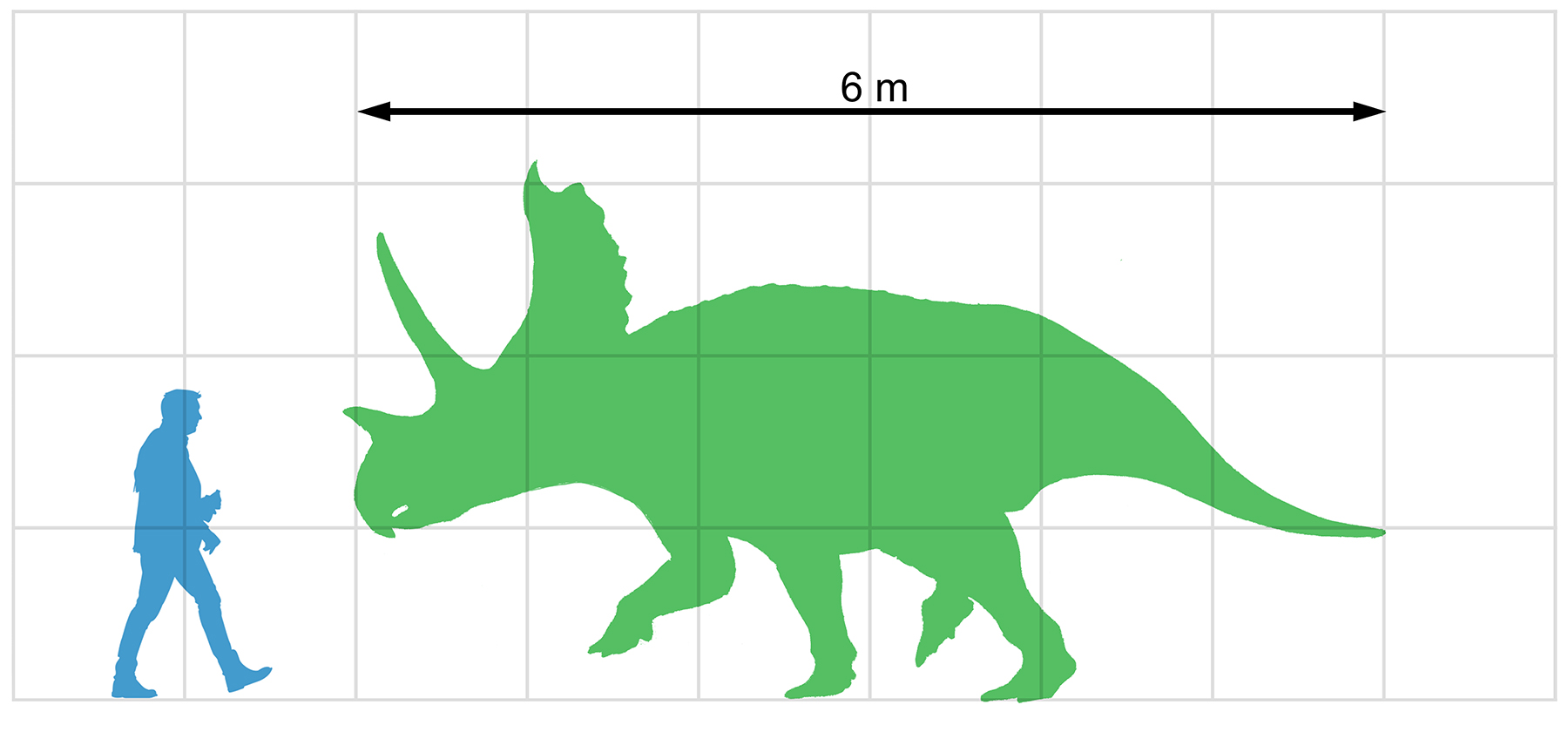
Size comparison of Agujaceratops mariscalensis to a human

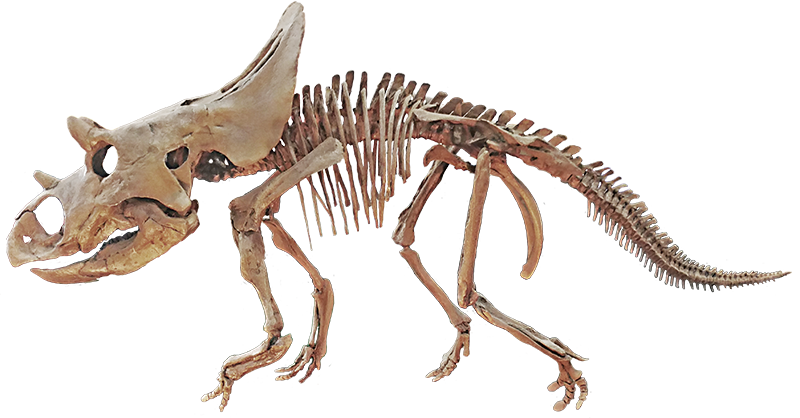
Juvenile Agujaceratops skeleton as reproduced by Triebold Paleontology in Woodland Park, Colorado, USA

In 1938, three dinosaur bone beds were excavated, and ceratopsian material was collected from Big Bend National Park (Texas) by William Strain. This material was studied by Lehman in 1989 and named Chasmosaurus mariscalensis. It is known only from the holotype UTEP P.37.7.086 a partial adult skull which includes a braincase, left supraorbital horncore, left maxilla and a right dentary. Additional material was associated with the holotype, but not considered to be part of it. All specimens of Agujaceratops were collected from the lower part of the Upper Shale member of the Aguja Formation, dating to about 77 million years ago, in the Big Bend National Park, Brewster County. Additional material was recovered from elsewhere in west Texas, including a nearly complete skull from Rattlesnake Mountain designated TMM 43098-1.

Originally described as Chasmosaurus mariscalensis by Lehman in 1989, subsequent analysis resulted in the taxon being put in its own genus. Agujaceratops was named by Spencer G. Lucas, Robert M. Sullivan and Adrian Hunt in 2006, and the type species is Agujaceratops mariscalensis.

Later, Lehman and colleagues revisited the Agujaceratops material and found substantial variation. They described the Rattlesnake Mountain skull as a new species, Agujaceratops mavericus.

== Description ==
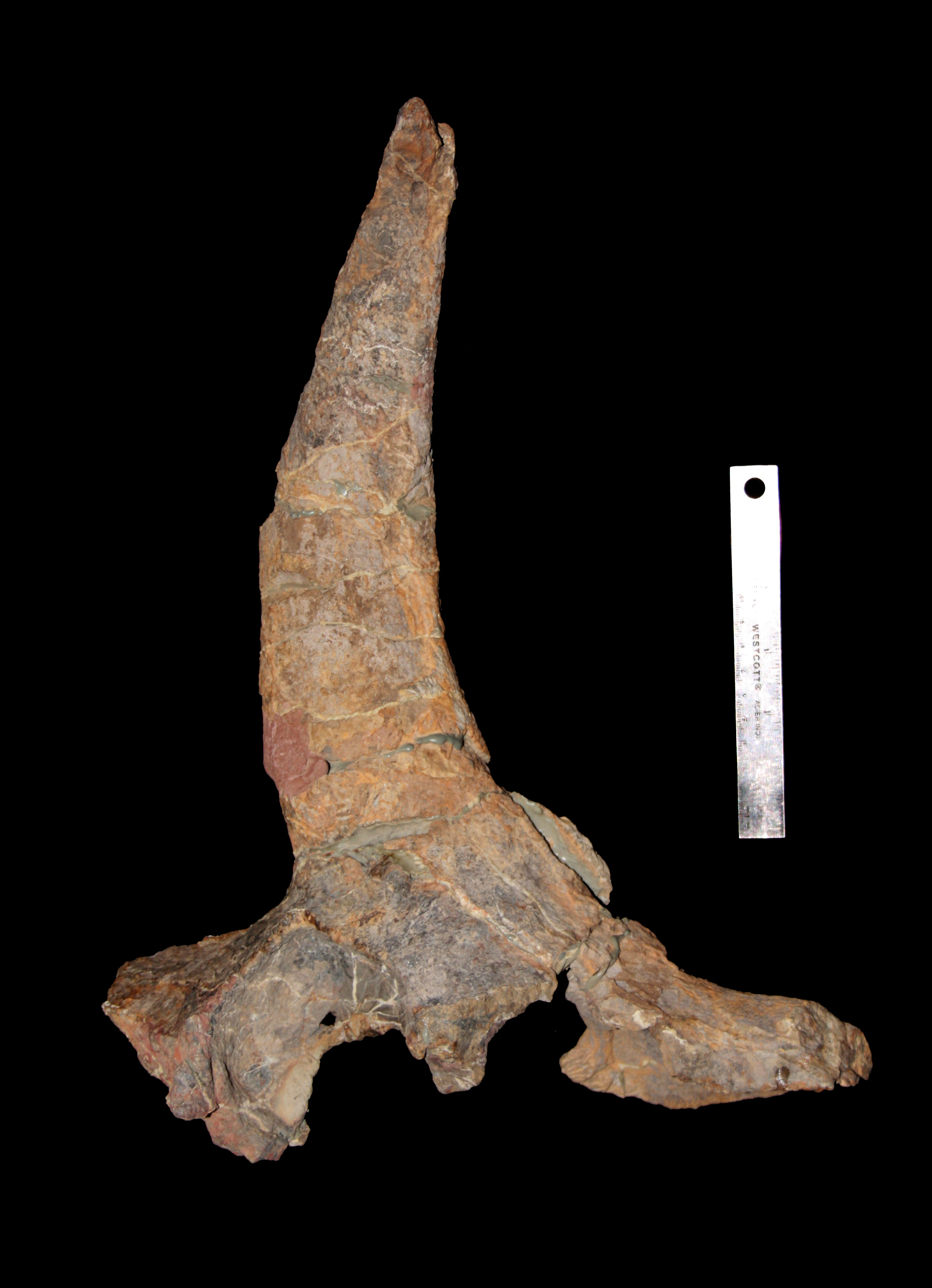
Agujaceratops mariscalensis brow horn

Agujaceratops was a relatively large horned dinosaur, reaching 4.3 metres (14 ft) in length and 1.5 metric tons (1.7 short tons) in body mass. It was similar to other chasmosaurines such as Pentaceratops in having a short nose horn, long brow horns, and an elongate frill circled by small hornlets. The back of the frill has a strong notch, as in Pentaceratops and Chasmosaurus, giving it a heart shape, with three or four pairs of spike-like hornlets. The edges of the frill bear numerous low, blunt hornlets, giving it a strongly scalloped appearance. The brow horns are oriented up and out, and curve backwards in side view.

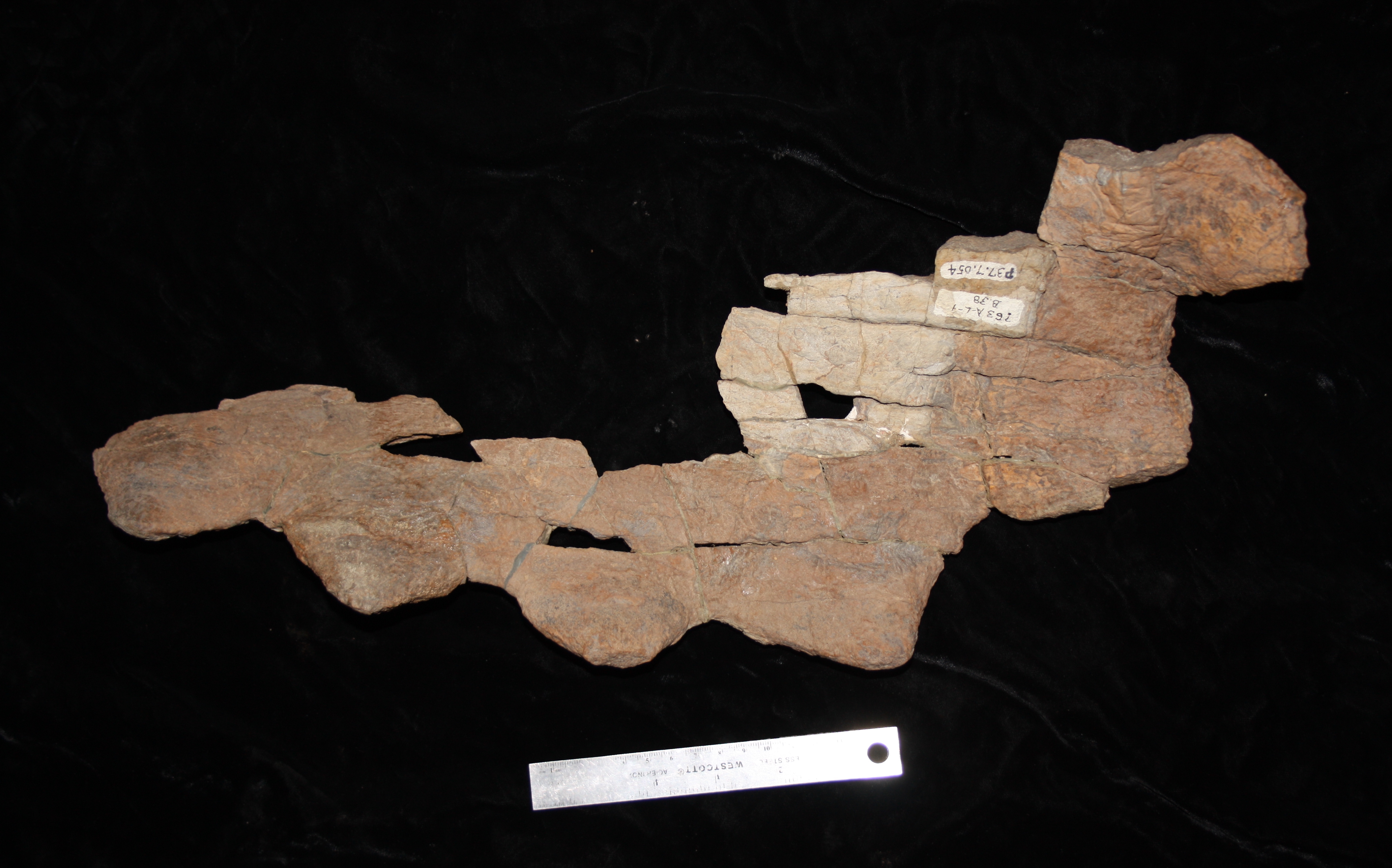
Agujaceratops mariscalensis squamosal

Two species are known, Agujaceratops mariscalensis and A. mavericus. A. mariscalensis has shorter brow horns and a shorter frill.

== Ecology ==
Like other ceratopsids, Agujaceratops was a four-legged plant eater. The elaborate frill and horns suggest a complex social life, perhaps involving displays towards and fights with other members of the species over territory or mating. Multiple individuals are found in a single quarry. It is unclear whether this represents animals brought together by a drought or flood event, or perhaps a herd. Although it is common to find multiple individuals of centrosaurine ceratopsids together - large bonebeds are known for Centrosaurus and Pachyrhinosaurus, for example - bonebeds are rarer for chasmosaurines.

At the time, the Aguja Formation lay along the western margin of the Western Interior Seaway. The habitat Agujaceratops lived in (at least where the fossil material was found) may have been a swamp, due to the nature of the sediments.

Agujaceratops lived alongside a fauna that included the feathered dinosaur Leptorhynchos gaddisi and the small pachycephalosaur Texacephale. Predators would have included tyrannosaurs and the giant crocodilian Deinosuchus riograndensis.

== See also ==
- Timeline of ceratopsian research
- 2016 in paleontology
