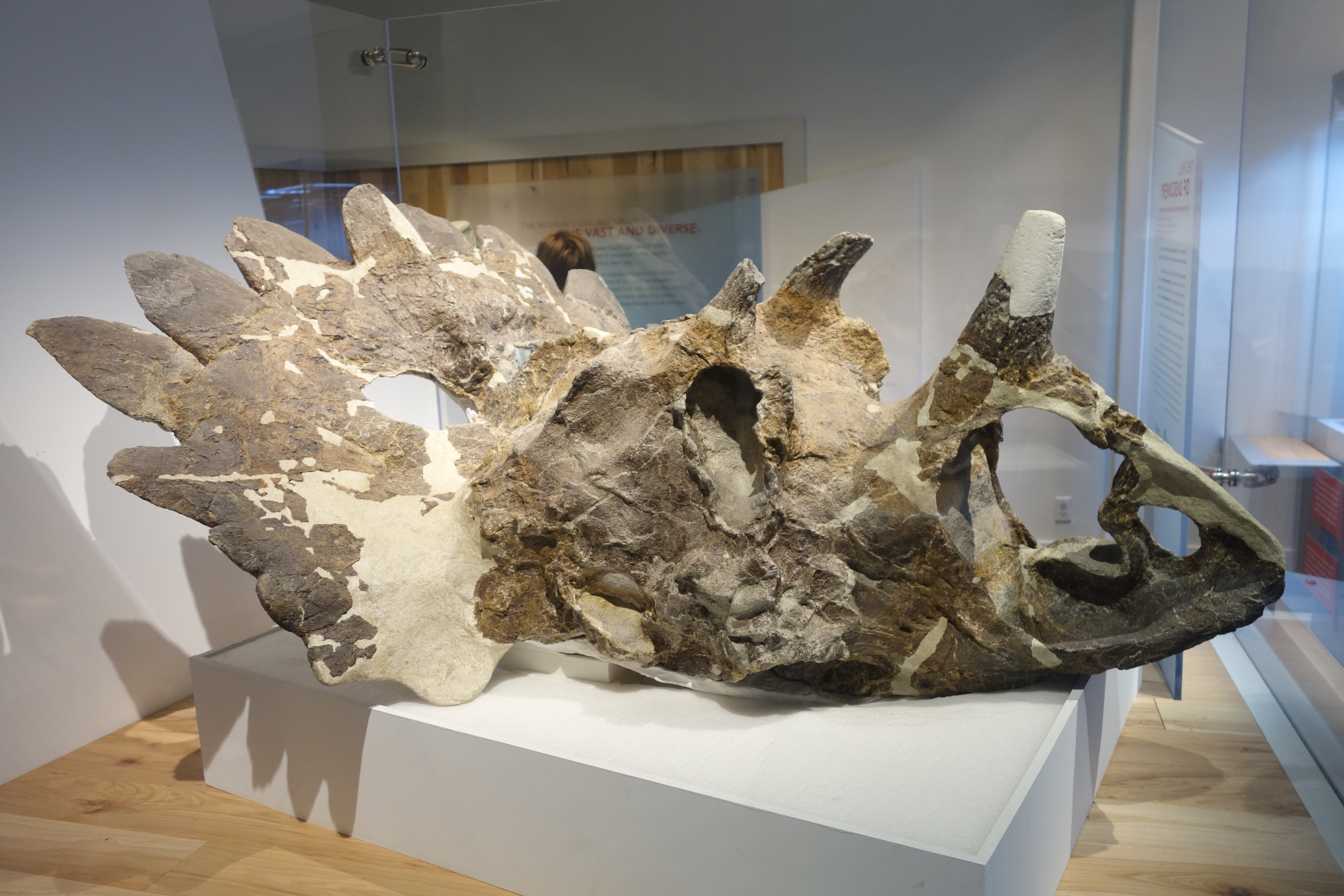
- Skull of Regaliceratops on display at the Royal Tyrrell Museum, Canada

Scientific classification
- Kingdom: Animalia
- Phylum: Chordata
- Class: Reptilia
- Clade: Dinosauria
- Clade: †Ornithischia
- Clade: †Ceratopsia
- Family: †Ceratopsidae
- Subfamily: †Chasmosaurinae
- Tribe: †Triceratopsini
- Genus: †Regaliceratops; Brown & Henderson, 2015

Type species
- †Regaliceratops peterhewsi Brown & Henderson, 2015

= Regaliceratops =

Regaliceratops Temporal range: Late Cretaceous, 68.5–67.5 Ma

Extinct genus of dinosaurs

Regaliceratops (meaning "Royal horned face") is a monospecific genus of chasmosaurine ceratopsid dinosaur from Alberta, Canada that lived during the Late Cretaceous (middle Maastrichtian stage, 68.5 to 67.5 Ma) in what is now the St. Mary River Formation. The type and only species, Regaliceratops peterhewsi, is known only from an adult individual with a nearly complete skull lacking the lower jaw, which was nicknamed "Hellboy". Regaliceratops was named in 2015 by Caleb M. Brown and Donald M. Henderson. Regaliceratops has an estimated length of 5 metres (16 ft) and body mass of 2 metric tons (2.2 short tons). The skull of Regaliceratops displays features more similar to centrosaurines, which suggests convergent evolution in display morphology in ceratopsids.

== Discovery and naming ==
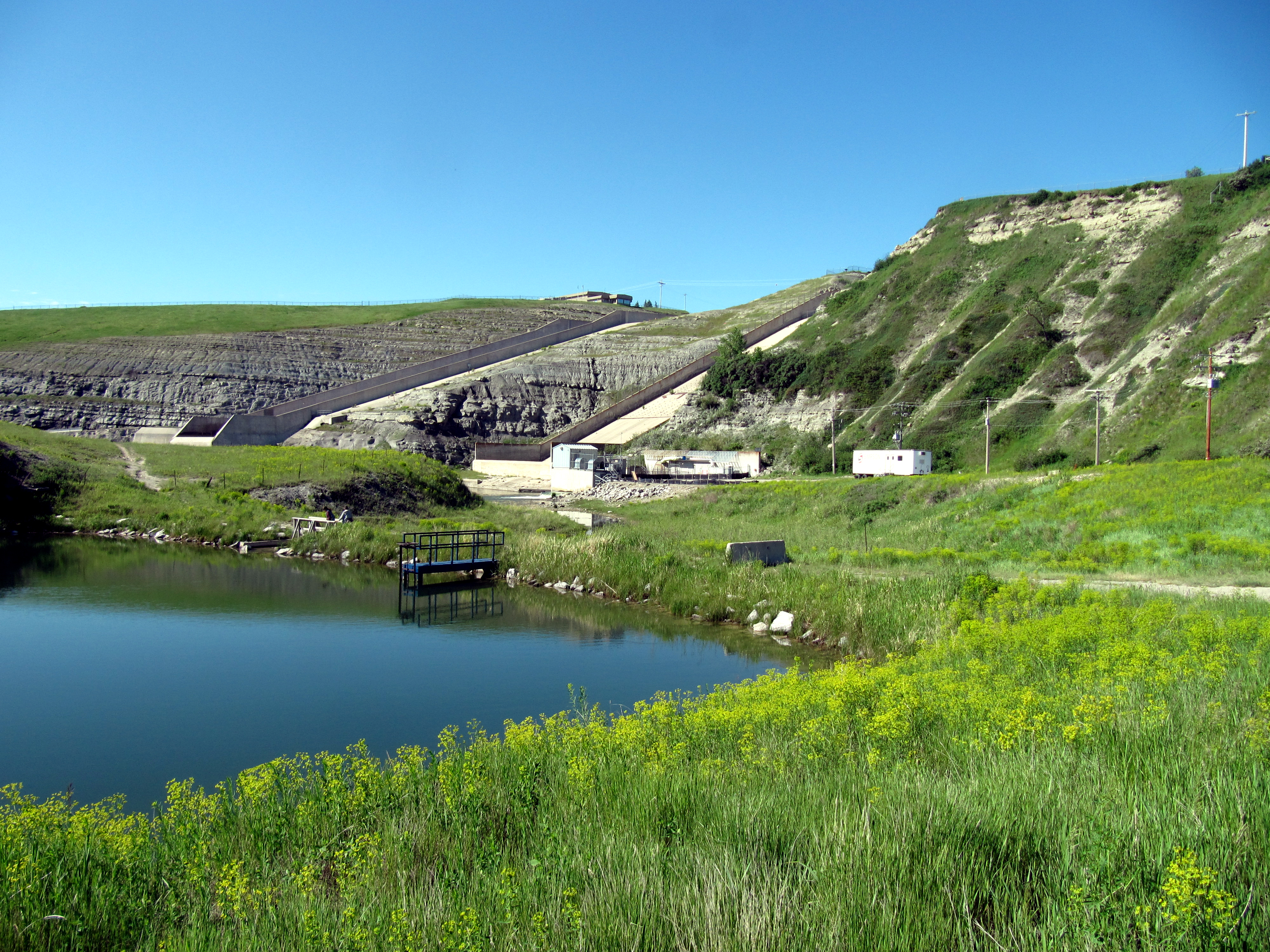
St. Mary River Formation in Alberta, Canada

In 2005, a skull of a ceratopsid was discovered by geologist Peter Hews from the St. Mary River Formation, along the Oldman River in southwestern Alberta. The skull was located in well cemented siltstone and with the tip of the snout sticking out of a cliff. The skull was excavated in 2006 and 2008 by a team of the Royal Tyrrell Museum and was removed in blocks. The excavation was described as being complicated as the specimen was in close proximity to protected spawning habitat for bull trout in the river. The specimen was nicknamed "Hellboy" due to the difficult and time-consuming excavation, in addition to the hard matrix, and the presence of small postorbital horncores with resorption pits. The specimen was subsequently named and described in 2015 by Caleb M. Brown and Donald M. Henderson.

The holotype specimen, TMP 2005.055.0001, consists of a nearly complete skull that is missing only the rostrum. The skull was deformed by compression and its rear and underside are obscured by the matrix. The specimen represents an adult individual as the cranial elements are fused together and the bone surface texture is rugose, unlike that of juvenile and subadult ceratopsids.

The generic name, Regaliceratops, is derived from the Latin word "regalis" (royal) and the Greek words "keras", (horn), and "ops", (face). The generic name is in reference to the crown-shaped parietosquamosal frill and the Royal Tyrrell Museum. The specific name, peterhewsi, honours the geologist Peter Hews, who discovered the type specimen. The skull was co-collected and prepared by Royal Tyrrell Museum senior technician Darren H. Tanke over a 17 month period.

== Description ==
=== Size and distinguishing traits ===
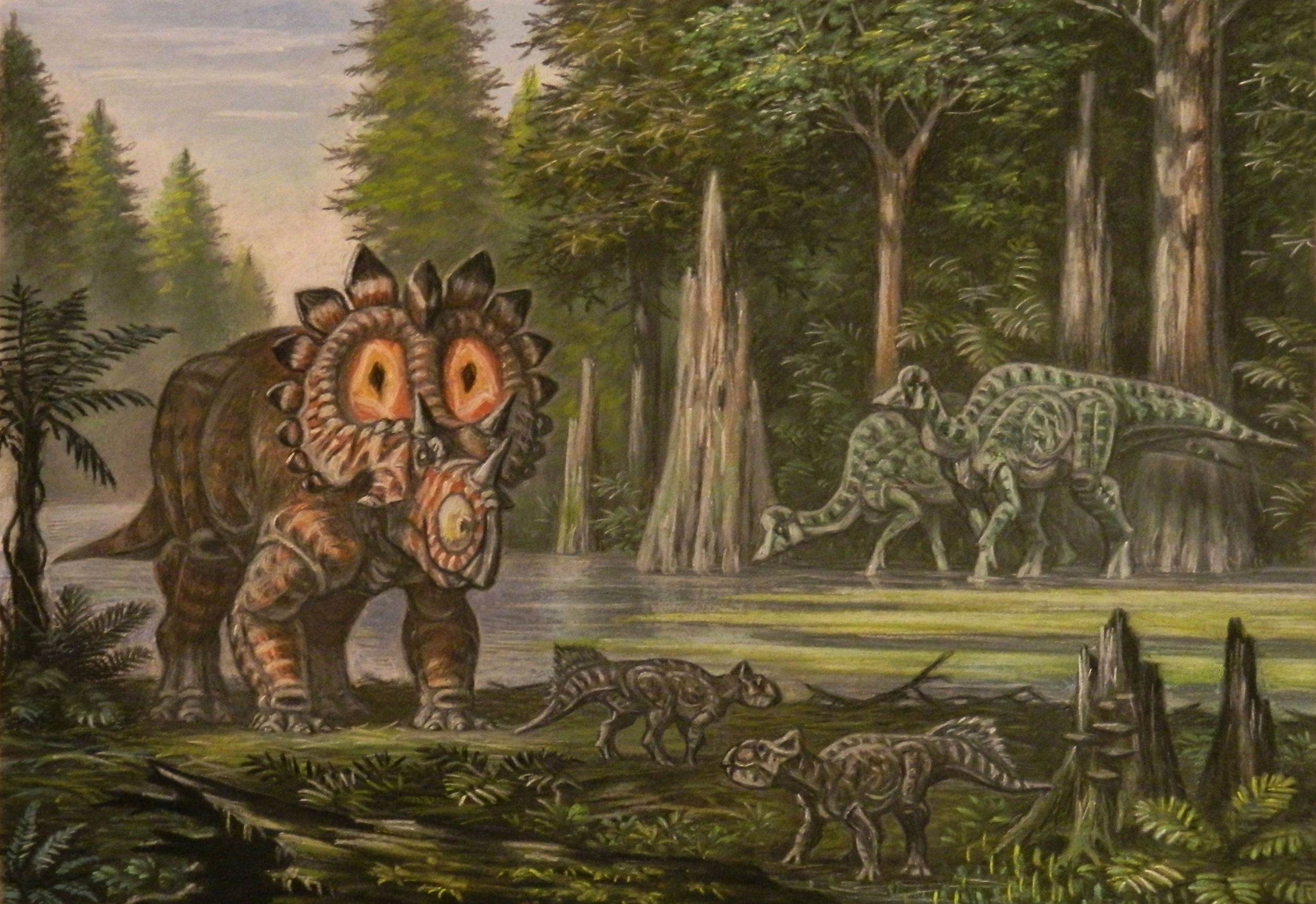
Restoration of Regaliceratops in environment

Regaliceratops was a large ceratopsian, reaching 5 metres (16 ft) in length and 2 metric tons (2.2 short tons) in body mass.

Brown & Henderson (2015) diagnosed Regaliceratops based on the presence of a single, midline epiparietal ossification that is offset from the plane of the frill and other epiparietals towards the rostrum with parietals projecting towards the posterior end that have a roughly triangular transverse cross-section; a prominent midline ridge on that parietal that merges with the median epiparietal; paired epiparietal ossifications that are long, flat, and roughly pentagonal shaped; a prominent postorbital ridge that runs diagonally from the supraorbital horncore to the base of the squamosal; parietal fenestrae that are small in size to orbit as in Kosmoceratops; and nasal horncores that are larger than the postorbital horncores as in Chasmosaurus belli and Vagaceratops.

=== Cranium ===
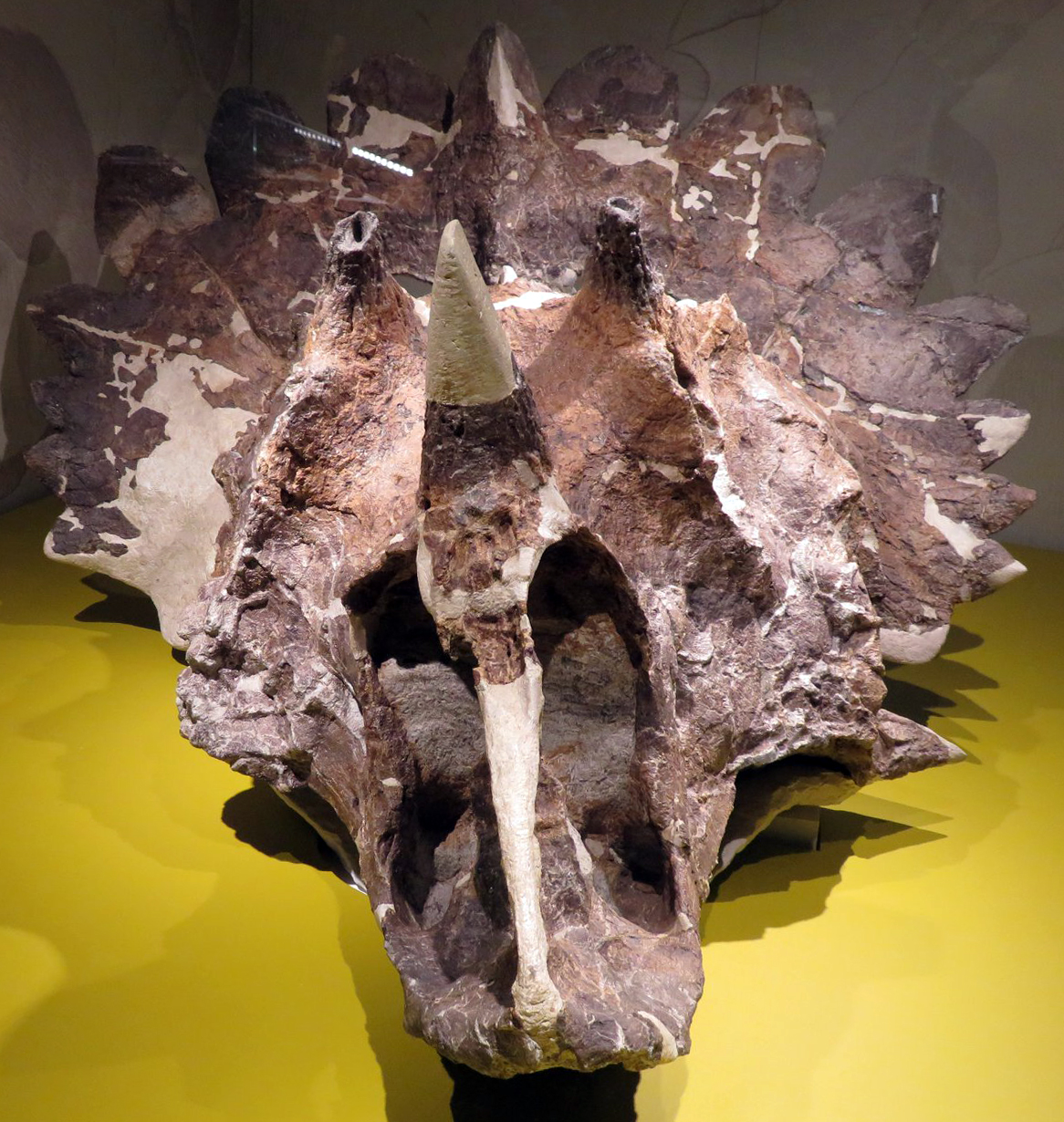
Holotype skull from the front.

The snout of the holotype specimen is short and tall, although it has been exaggerated by the tectonic shortening of the skull. The paired premaxillae form the median premaxillary septum, with the rostral portion of the median premaxillary septum being thin forming the prominent septal fossa. Unlike Triceratops and Titanoceratops, the prominent septal fossa lacks the accessory strut. The fossa is further thinned at the caudal portion and is spread throughout by the presence of a large interpremaxillary fenestra as in Anchiceratops, Arrhinoceratops and Triceratops. Regaliceratops, and other chasmosaurines, has the caudal wall of the interpremaxillary fenestra bounded by a condensed narial strut that moves back and forth from the floor of the premaxillae to the upper process of the premaxillae. Unlike Titanoceratops and Triceratops, the narial strut isn't as broad and triangular but is, instead, sinuous in shape. The premaxillae flare towards the sides which form the rostroventral margin of the external nares on the rostral and ventral margins. The maxillary process projects caudodorsally from the flared underside aspect of the premaxilla. Unlike Campanian chasmosaurines such as Chasmosaurus and Utahceratops, the caudoventral process of Regaliceratops tapers caudally without forking, and inserts between the maxilla and nasal towards the sides. The upper margin of the external naris is formed by the rostral process and horncore base, and extends caudal to the rostral margin of the maxillary tooth row. As in Bravoceratops, the nasal shows no constriction situated caudal to the horncore. As in Chasmosaurus, the midpoint of the horncore is positioned at the caudal extreme of the external naris. The nasal horncore has an estimated preserved height of 148 mm and an estimated total height range of 240 to 280mm when the side slopes of the horncore are extrapolated. The nasal horncore is straight and has a tear drop shape in horizontal cross section.

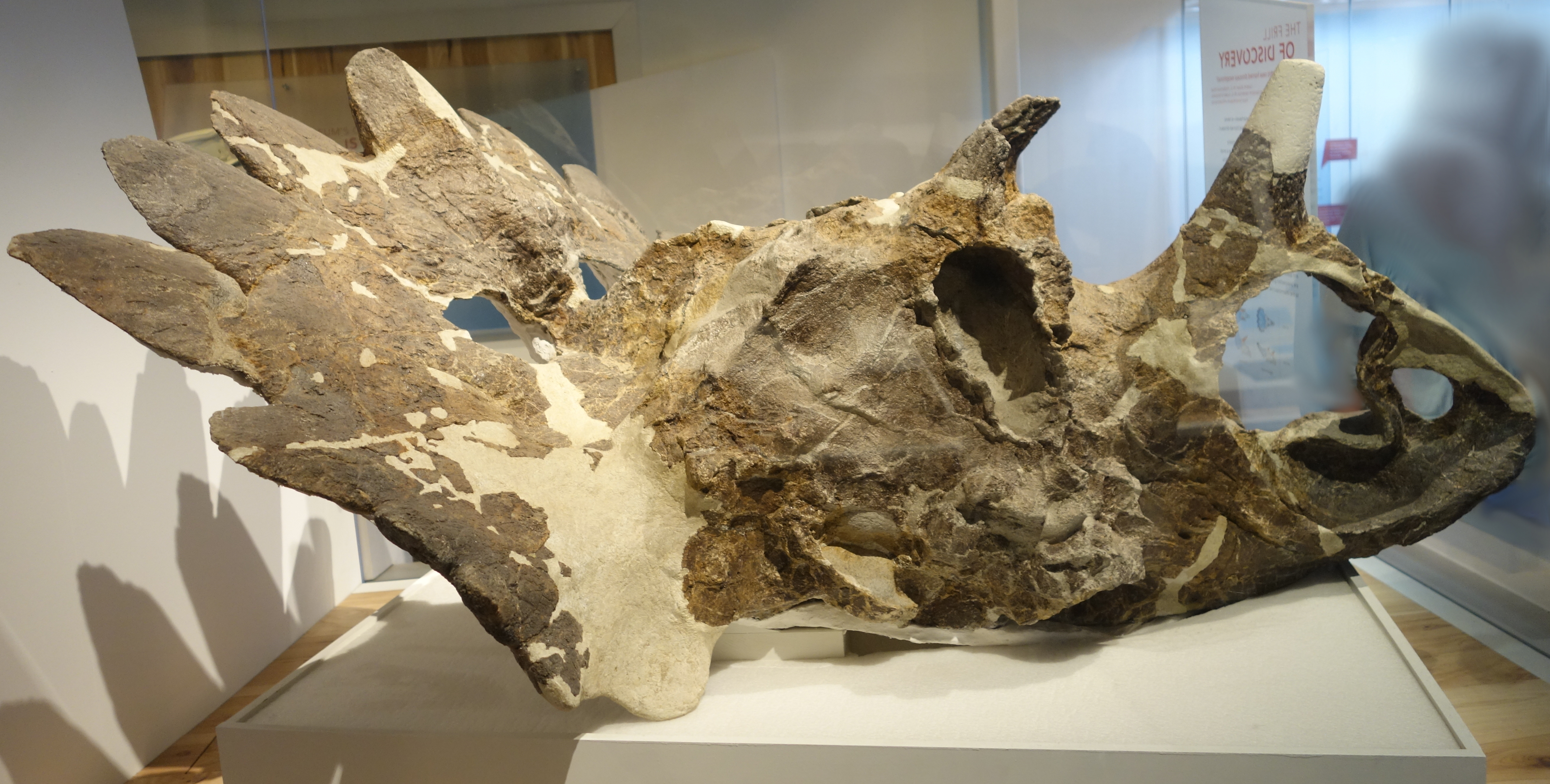
Holotype skull from the right side.

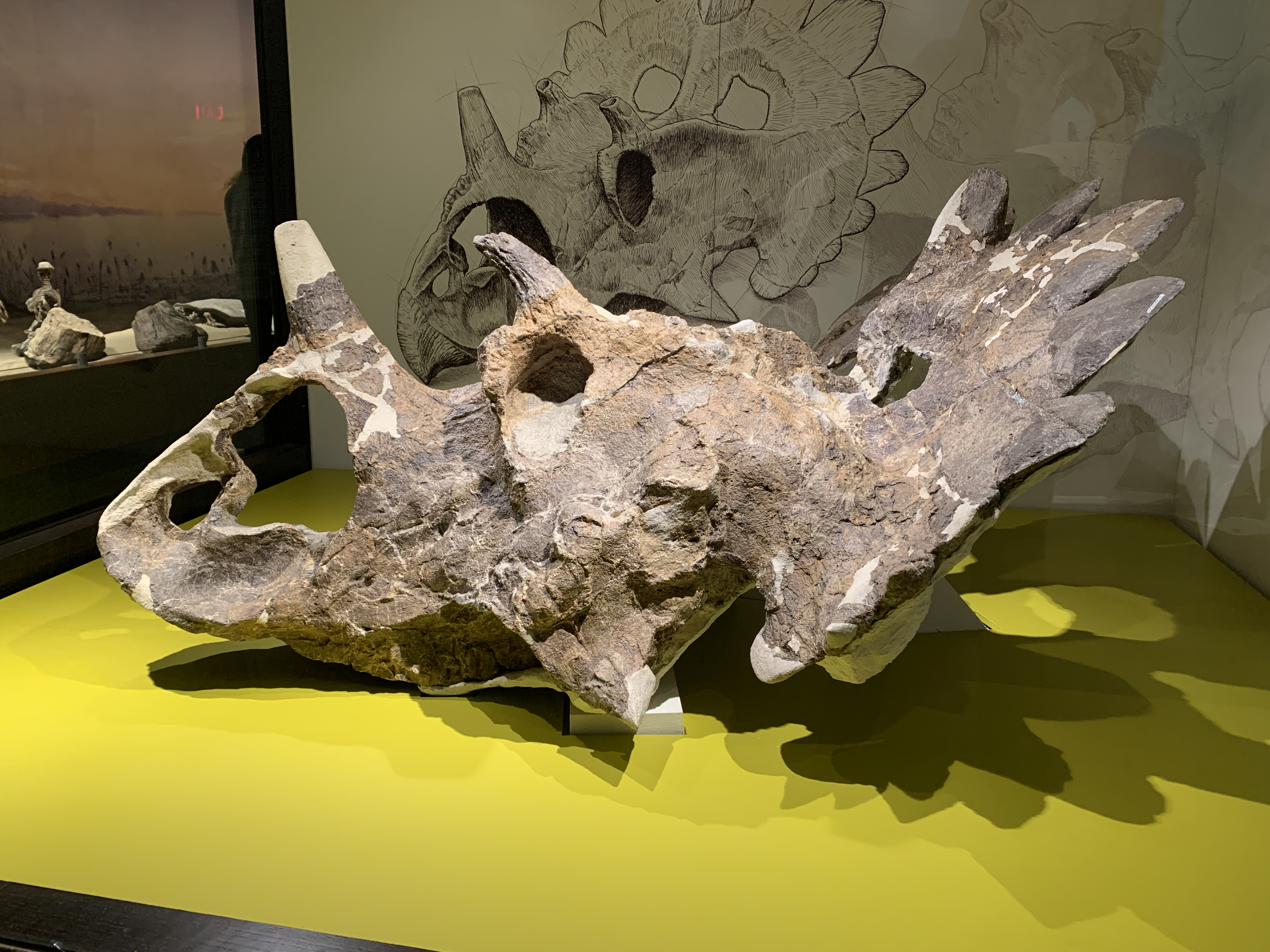
Holotype skull from the left side.

The orbital margin shows a sharp ridge that flares towards the sides, which may be a result of post-depositional deformation, and a smooth confluent margin on the right and left margins. The orbits are highly ellipsoidal, unlike other ceratopsids that have slightly ellipsoidal orbits. The rostrodorsal margin of the orbital rim consists of the palpebral, and swells towards the sides and rostrums which forms an antorbital buttress. The antorbital buttress is larger than that of most chasmosaurines. Unlike Kosmoceratops, the postorbital horncore of Regaliceratops is arranged slightly caudal to the orbit but shares the narrow base. The postorbital horncores are also directed upwards and are procurved towards the rostrum in side view, as in Pentaceratops. The postorbital horncores are smaller in size to the nasal horncore and has a surface that is oriented vascular grooves. A prominent postorbital ridge is present caudomedially to the horncore which is equivalent to the supraorbital squamosal scale row. The laterotemporal fenestrae are bounded by the jugal towards the rostrum and squamosal towards the posterior. The orbital margin is smooth and not thickened. The base of the epijugal is only slightly smaller than the postorbital horncores. The jugal's caudal margin forms the border of the laterotemporal fenestrae, which is also bordered by the laterotemporal process of the squamosal. However, this may not have been the true morphology due to the lack of a distinct quadratojugal. Bounded by the squamosal towards the posterior is the jugal notch.

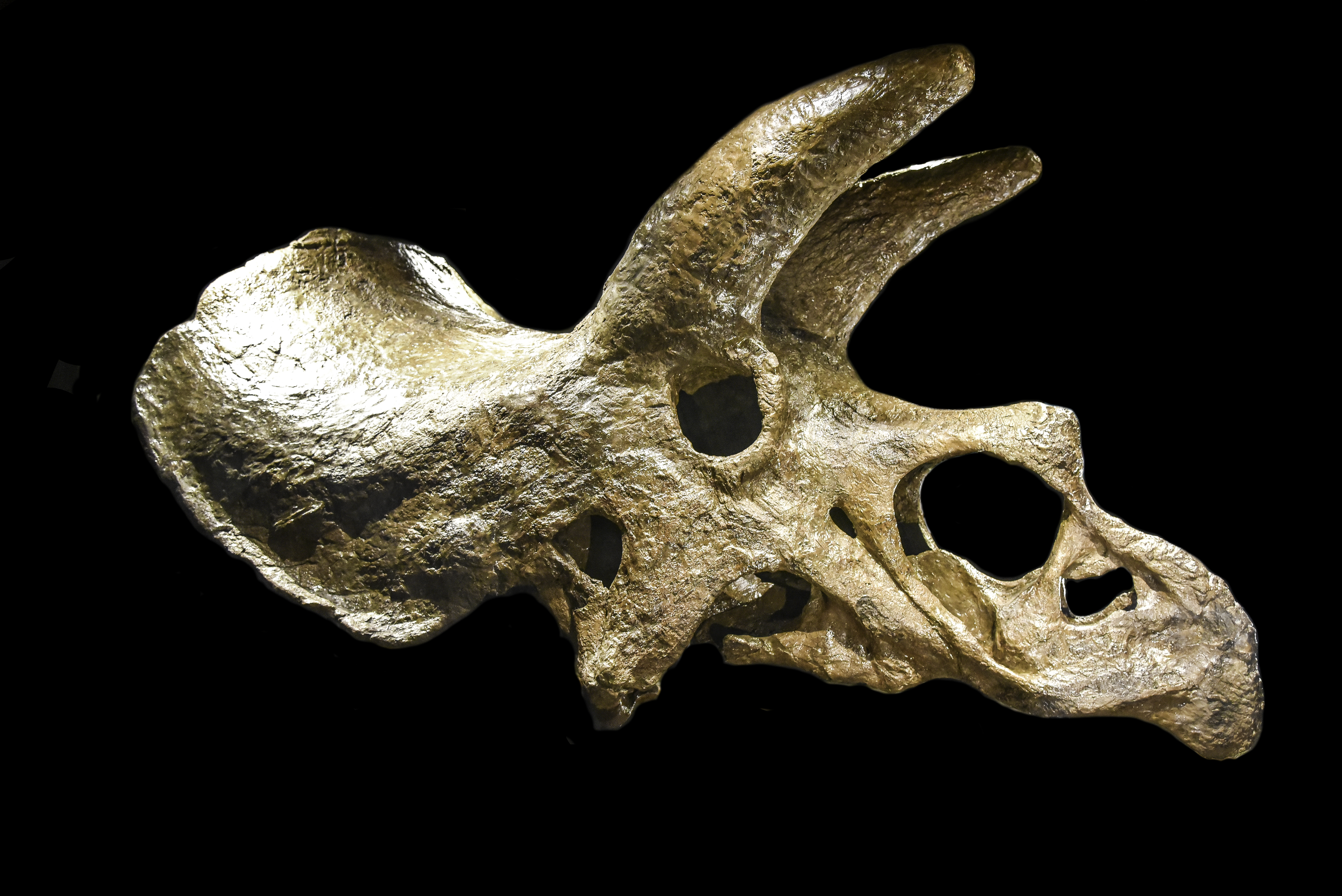
Skull of Triceratops, a close relative of Regaliceratops

The frill of Regaliceratops is nearly semicircle in shape in rostrodorsal view, with ossifications along the circumference. The frill is also short and wide, with the greatest transverse width being located at its midlength as in Torosaurus and Triceratops. The left squamosal has an elongated caudal portion, with a lateral margin that has a prominent jugal notch that is followed by a margin towards the rostrum that is continuous with that of the parietal caudal margin and bears triangular epiossifications. The lateral margin of the parietal has a straight suture with the medial edge of the squamosals and the caudal margin forms the middle half of the broad semicircle of the frill. The frill's caudalmost portion is located in the midline and the midline bars ends in a rostrally projecting bone. A prominent sagittal swelling is dominant on the midline of the parietal and forms a keel. The large, medial epiparietal is positioned where the sideways curving epiparietal hooks of Anchiceratops are and differs from the epiparietal hooks as it is confluent with the median ridge and is triangular in cross-section. A median epiossification on the parietal of the frill is possibly similar to those of Ojoceratops and Bravoceratops. The frill is also adorned with seven paired epiossifications that gradually decrease in size, which are similar in shape to those of Anchiceratops but are similar in placement to Triceratops. Two epiparietals are pentagonal in shape and may represent the largest epiossifications recorded in chasmosaurines. Triangular in shape are three rostralmost episquamosals which decrease in size towards the rostrum, while spade-shaped is the caudalmost episquamosal. The large pentagonal epiparietals and the smaller caudalmost episquamosal are both transitional in size and shape. The cranial ornamentation of Regaliceratops is similar to that of centrosaurine ceratopsids as the nasal horn and epiossifications are represented as larger relative to the postorbital horns and frill length. The similarities between the cranial ornamentation of Regaliceratops and centrosaurines indicates convergent evolution in horn morphology. Brown & Henderson (2015) hypothesised that, not only did it convergently evolve morphologically, but also behaviourally after the extinction of centrosaurines in the early Maastrichtian as convergent horn evolution in mammals often correlates with convergent social behaviours.

== Classification ==
Brown & Henderson (2015) originally placed Regaliceratops within Triceratopsini, in a polytomy with Eotriceratops, Ojoceratops, and a clade containing more nested taxa such as Nedoceratops, Titanoceratops, Triceratops and Torosaurus. However, Mallon et al. (2016) found Regaliceratops to be outside of Triceratopsini, in a polytomy with Anchiceratops, Arrhinoceratops and Triceratopsini. Dalman et al. (2022) once more recovered Regaliceratops within Triceratopsini, sister taxon to Triceratops horridus, Triceratops prorsus and Ojoceratops.

A phylogenetic analysis conducted by Mallon et al. (2016) is reproduced below.

- Anchiceratops ornatus
- Regaliceratops peterhewsi
- - Arrhinoceratops brachyops
  - - Triceratopsini
      - - Ojoceratops fowleri
        - Titanoceratops ouranos
        - Nedoceratops hatcheri
        - Torosaurus latus
        - "Torosaurus" utahensis
        - - Triceratops prorsus
          - Triceratops horridus

The results of an earlier analysis by Brown & Henderson (2015) are reproduced below.

- Triceratopsini
  - Regaliceratops peterhewsi
  - Eotriceratops xerinsularis
  - Ojoceratops fowleri
  - - Titanoceratops ouranos
    - - Nedoceratops hatcheri
      - - - Torosaurus latus
          - Torosaurus utahensis
        - - Triceratops horridus
          - Triceratops prorsus

== Paleoenvironment ==
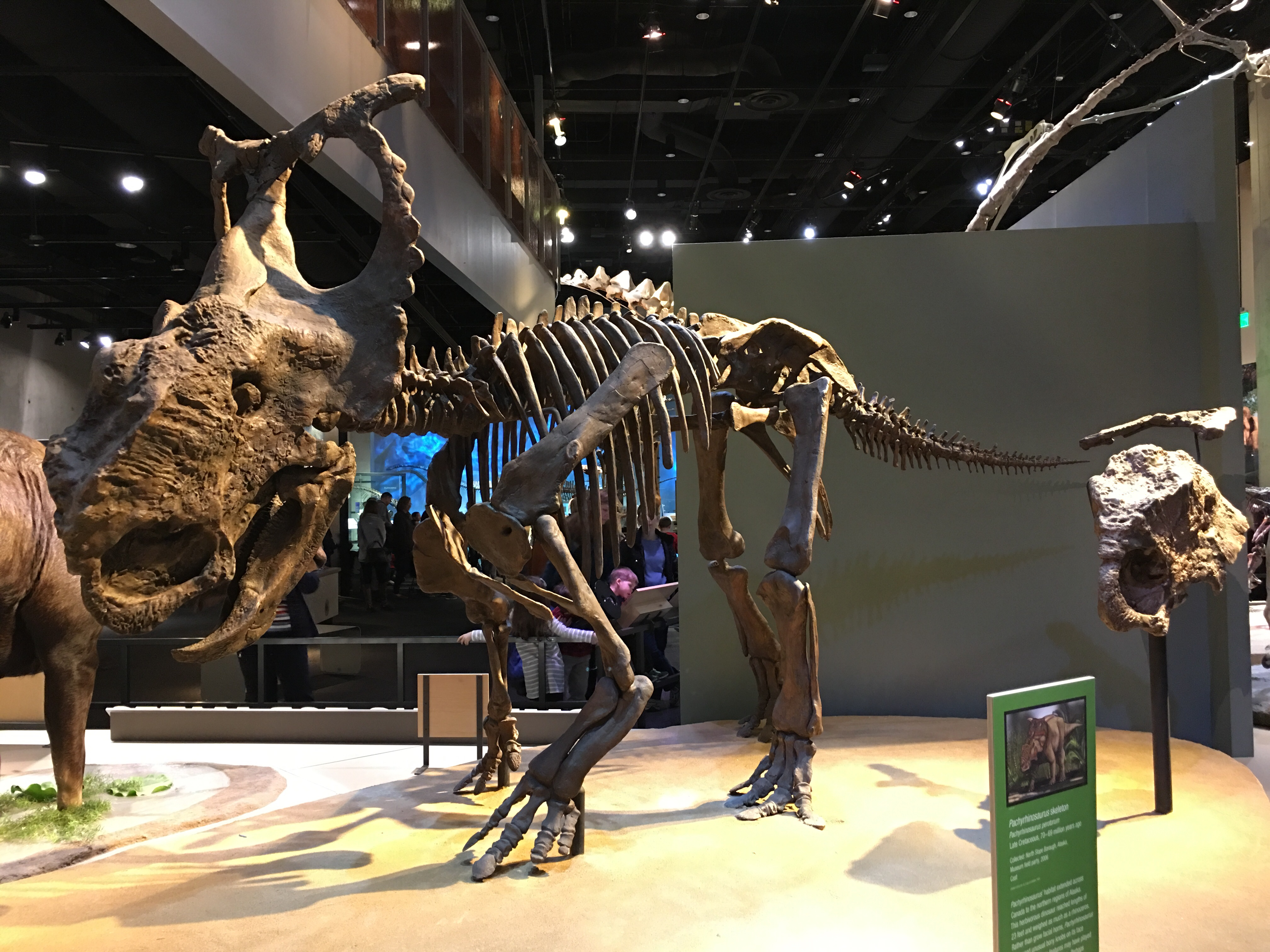
Pachyrhinosaurus, a centrosaurine ceratopsid contemporaneous with Regaliceratops.

Regaliceratops is known from the St. Mary River Formation which has been dated to the middle Maastrichtian stage of the Late Cretaceous period. The lower St. Mary River Formation was deposited in brackish water environments, with the remainder of the formation being deposited in freshwater fluvial and floodplain environments. The formation is characterized by fine-grained sandstones, grey shales, coquinoid beds, carbonaceous mudstones, coal beds, interbedded sandstone and siltstone, with minor occurrences of carbonaceous shale. Ferns, ginkgoes, conifers, Trapa-like plants, sabaloid palms and at least six types of large monocot leaves are known from the formation.

The fauna of the St. Mary River Formation consists of the nodosaurid ankylosaur Edmontonia, the leptoceratopsid ceratopsian Montanoceratops, the centrosaurine ceratopsid Pachyrhinosaurus, a ceratopsid that was previously considered to be Anchiceratops, the albertosaurine tyrannosaurid Albertosaurus, the saurornitholestine dromaeosaurid Saurornitholestes, the troodontid Troodon, the mammals Cimolomys, Meniscoessus, Mesodma, Cimolodon, Pediomys, Didelphodon and Eodelphis, the fish Myledaphus and Lepisosteus, the crocodylomorph Leidyosuchus, and the choristodere Champsosaurus.

== See also ==
- Timeline of ceratopsian research
