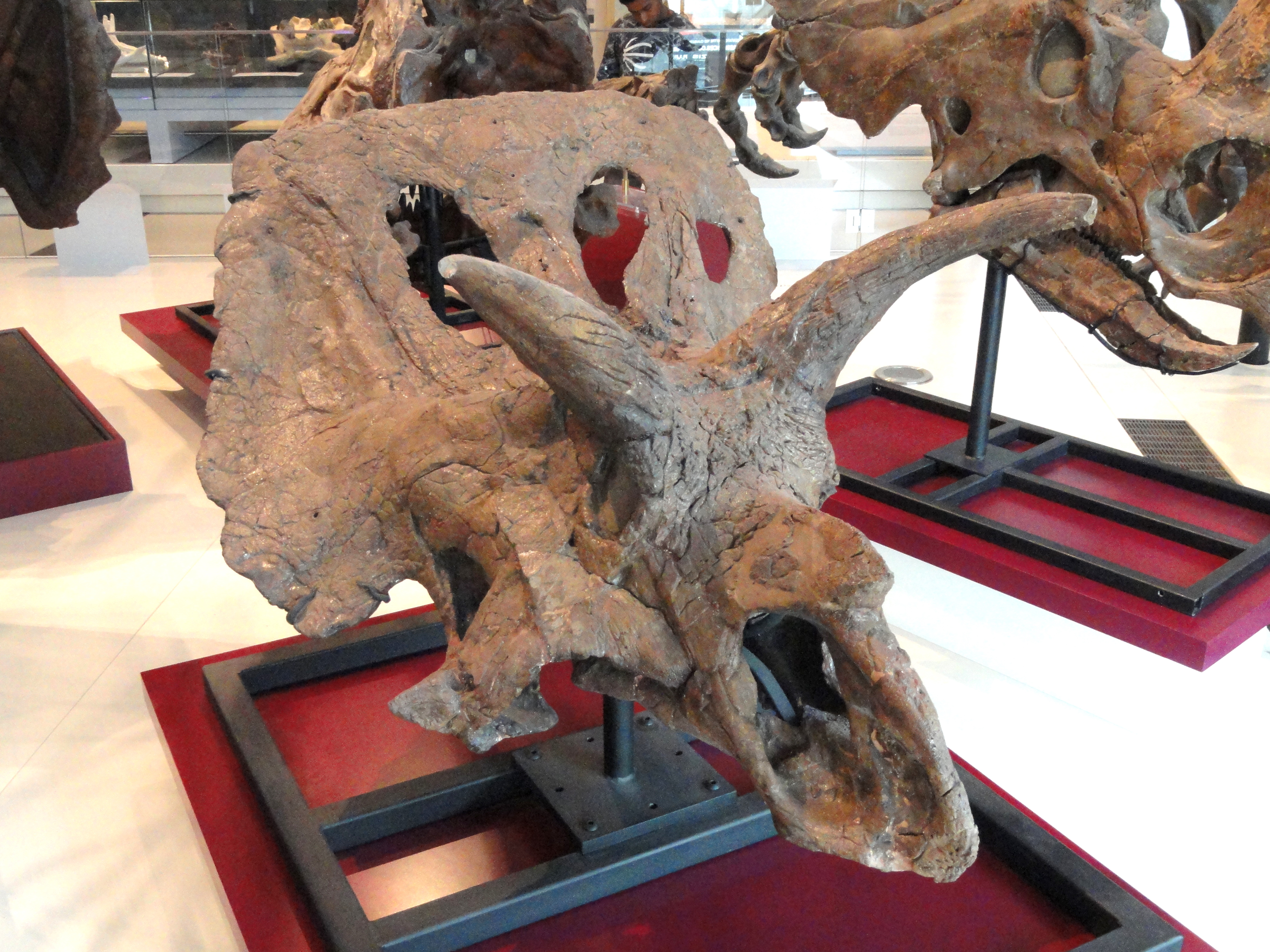
- Arrhinoceratops brachyops at the Royal Ontario Museum

Scientific classification
- Kingdom: Animalia
- Phylum: Chordata
- Class: Reptilia
- Clade: Dinosauria
- Clade: †Ornithischia
- Clade: †Ceratopsia
- Family: †Ceratopsidae
- Subfamily: †Chasmosaurinae
- Genus: †Arrhinoceratops; Parks, 1925
- Species: †A. brachyops

Binomial name
- †Arrhinoceratops brachyops Parks, 1925

= Arrhinoceratops =

Arrhinoceratops Temporal range: Early Maastrichtian, 70.6–70 Ma

Extinct species of dinosaurs

Arrhinoceratops (meaning "no nose-horn face", derived from the Ancient Greek "a-/α-" "no", rhis/ῥίς "nose" "keras/κέρας" "horn", "-ops/ὤψ" "face") is a genus of herbivorous ceratopsian dinosaur. The name was coined as its original describer concluded it was special because the nose-horn was not a separate bone, however further analysis revealed this was based on a misunderstanding. It lived during the latest Campanian/earliest Maastrichtian stage of the Late Cretaceous, predating its famous relative Triceratops by a few million years, although it was contemporary with Anchiceratops. Its remains have been found in Canada.

== Discoveries and species ==
Described by William Arthur Parks in 1925, Arrhinoceratops is known from a partially crushed, slightly distorted skull which lacked the lower jaws. The remains were collected from the Neill's Ranch site, along the Red Deer River in Alberta by a 1923 expedition from the University of Toronto.

Parks named the type species Arrhinoceratops brachyops. The generic name is derived from Greek α~, "without", ῥίς, rhis, "nose", κέρας, keras, "horn", and ὤψ, ops, "face" as Parks had established that no separate nose-horn was present. The specific name means "short-faced" from Greek βραχύς, brachys, "short".

The holotype is ROM 796 (earlier ROM 5135), which was found in a layer of the Horseshoe Canyon Formation dating from the latest Campanian or perhaps earliest Maastrichtian. It consists of the original skull.

Other material from Utah, found in the 1930s, was posthumously named Arrhinoceratops? utahensis by Charles Whitney Gilmore in 1946. It is based on holotype USNM 15583. The question mark indicates that Gilmore himself had doubts about the identification. In 1976, Douglas A. Lawson transferred the species to Torosaurus, as a Torosaurus utahensis.

Apart from the holotype skull little fossil material of Arrhinoceratops brachyops has been found. In 1981 Helen Tyson in a revision of the genus, provisionally referred specimen ROM 1439, but in 2007 Andrew Farke moved this to Torosaurus.

== Description ==
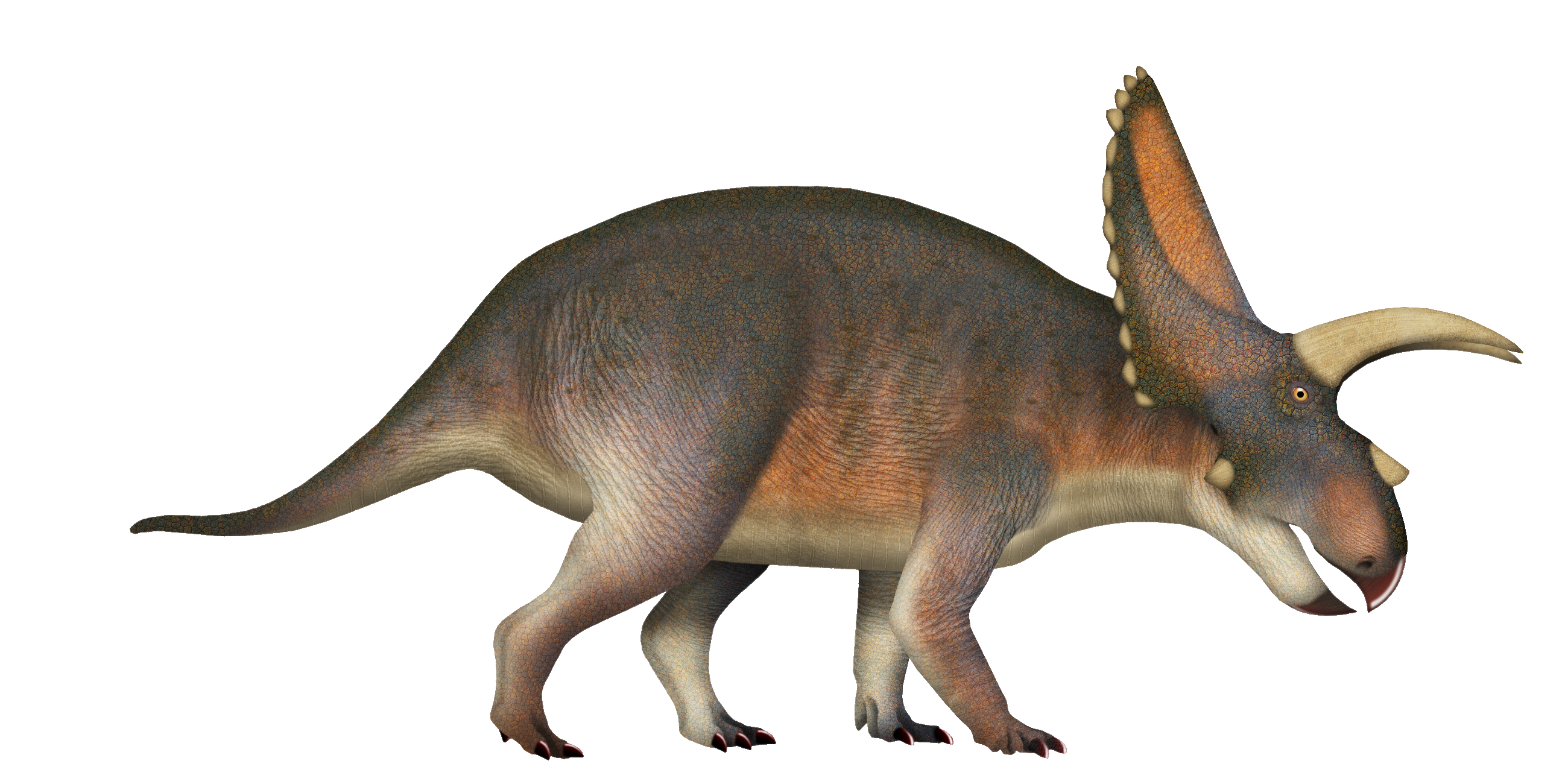
Restoration

Since this dinosaur is known only from its skull, scientists have few data about its overall anatomy. The skull, as restored, features a broad, square, neck frill with two oval shaped openings. The frill is deeply veined on both the top and the underside by arterial grooves. The sides of the frill are adorned by about nine osteoderms. The rear edge of the frill is lightly scalloped. The left squamosal in the frill side of the holotype shows a pathological opening, perhaps the result of a wound. Its brow horns were moderately long, but its nose horn was shorter and blunter than most ceratopsids. The snout is short and high. Its body is assumed to be typical of the Ceratopsidae. Based on the skull some popular-science books estimate the body length to be 6 m (20 ft) long when fully grown. In 2010, Gregory S. Paul estimated its length at 4.5 metres (15 ft), its weight at 1.3 tonnes (2,900 lb).

Already Richard Swann Lull had in 1933 been politely critical of Parks' original description, and Tyson discovered that Parks had made many mistakes. The most notable of these was that the very trait the genus was named after, the lack of a separate ossification or os epinasale for the nose-horn, is in fact normal for the ceratopsids, in which group this horn is an outgrowth of the nasal bone, not a distinct element. Other incorrect observations by Parks included the conclusion that the os rostrale, the bone core of the upper beak, directly touched the nasals instead of being separated from them by the premaxillae; a presumed anterior process of the jugal touching the premaxilla; and thinking that the interparietal bar of the frill presented a separate skeletal element, an os interparietale.

== Phylogeny ==
Arrhinoceratops was by Parks placed within the Ceratopsia (this name is Ancient Greek for "horned faces"), a group of herbivorous dinosaurs with parrot-like beaks which thrived in North America and Asia during the Cretaceous Period, which ended roughly 66 million years ago. In 1930 Lori Russell refined this to the Ceratopsidae. Tyson concluded it was closely related to Torosaurus, probably even its direct ancestor.

Modern research indicates that Arrhinoceratops is a member of the Chasmosaurinae. Cladistic analyses recover it close to Anchiceratops.

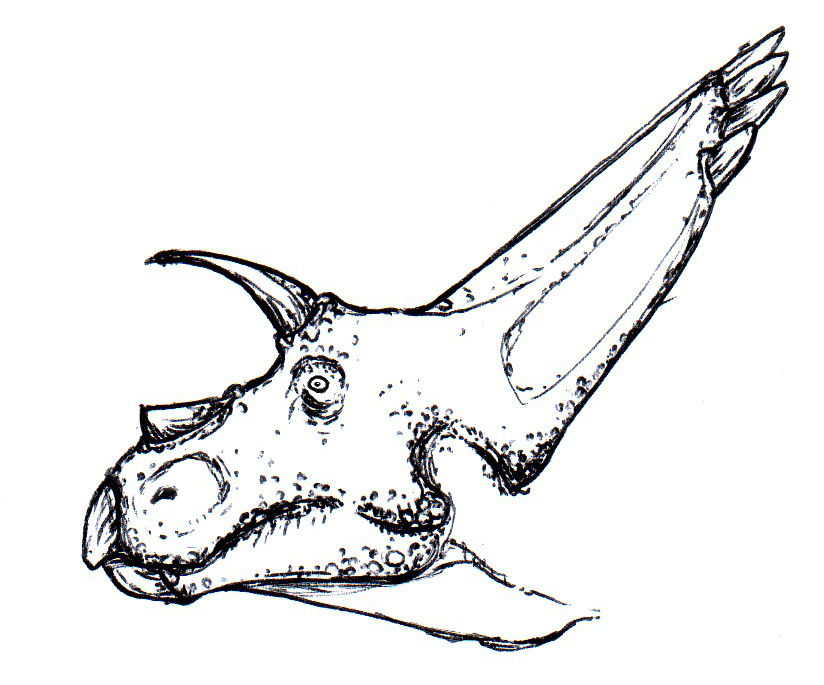
Restoration of the head

The following cladogram shows the phylogeny of Arrhinoceratops according to a study by Scott Sampson e.a. in 2010.

- Ceratopidae
  - Centrosaurinae
  - Chasmosaurinae
    - Chasmosaurus
    - - Mojoceratops
      - - Agujaceratops
        - - - Utahceratops
            - Pentaceratops
          - - Coahuilaceratops
            - - - Kosmoceratops
                - Vagaceratops
              - - Anchiceratops
                - - Arrhinoceratops
                  - - Ojoceratops
                    - Eotriceratops
                    - - Torosaurus
                      - - Nedoceratops
                        - Triceratops

== Paleobiology ==
Arrhinoceratops lived in a wet coast-land with warm summers but cool winters. It was likely preyed upon by Albertosaurus.

Arrhinoceratops, like all ceratopsians, was a herbivore. During the Cretaceous, flowering plants were "geographically limited on the landscape", and so it is likely that this dinosaur fed on the predominant plants of the era: ferns, cycads and conifers. It would have used its sharp ceratopsian beak to bite off the leaves or needles. Its habitat was densely forested.

== See also ==
- Timeline of ceratopsian research
