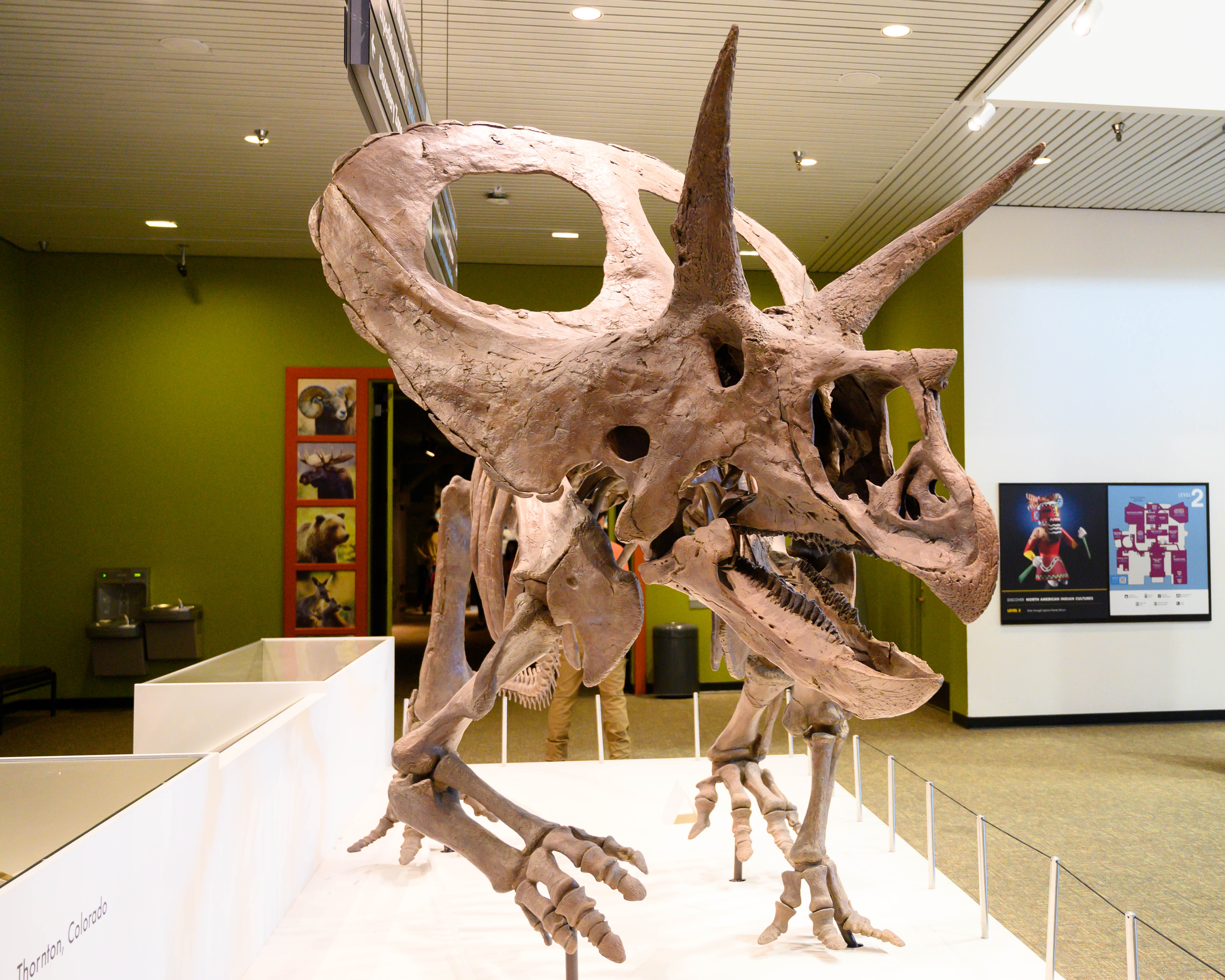
- Specimen nicknamed "Tiny", Denver Museum of Nature and Science

Scientific classification
- Kingdom: Animalia
- Phylum: Chordata
- Class: Reptilia
- Clade: Dinosauria
- Clade: †Ornithischia
- Clade: †Ceratopsia
- Family: †Ceratopsidae
- Subfamily: †Chasmosaurinae
- Tribe: †Triceratopsini
- Genus: †Torosaurus; Marsh, 1891

Type species
- †Torosaurus latus Marsh, 1891

Other species
- †T.? utahensis (Gilmore, 1946) Lawson, 1976

Synonyms
- Arrhinoceratops? utahensis Gilmore, 1946; Torosaurus gladius Marsh, 1891

= Torosaurus =

Torosaurus Temporal range: Late Cretaceous (Maastrichtian), 68–66 Ma

Extinct genus of dinosaurs

Torosaurus (meaning "perforated lizard", in reference to the large openings in its frill) is a genus of herbivorous chasmosaurine ceratopsian dinosaur which lived during the Maastrichtian Stage of the Cretaceous Period between 68 and 66 million years ago, although it is possible that the species range might extend back as far back as 69 million years ago. Fossils which have been definitively identified as Torosaurus or which might belong to it have been discovered across the Western Interior of North America, from as far north as Saskatchewan to as far south as Texas.

Measuring between 7.5 and 9 m (25 and 30 ft) and weighing around 8 t (18,000 lb), Torosaurus possessed the longest skull of any known land animal, with the frilled skull reaching 2.77 metres (9.1 ft) in length. Torosaurus is thought to have been the same size as the contemporary Triceratops, but is distinguished by an elongated frill with large oval shaped openings, long squamosal bones of the frill with a trough on their upper surface, and the presence of five or more pairs of hornlets on the back of the frill. Torosaurus possessed a short upright nose horn similar to that seen in Triceratops horridus. Two species of Torosaurus are presently considered valid: T. latus and T. utahensis. Torosaurus gladius is no longer considered a valid species, being now considered a synonym of T. latus.

In 2010, the validity of Torosaurus was disputed. A study of fossil bone histology combined with an investigation of frill shape concluded that Torosaurus probably represented the mature form of Triceratops, with the bones of typical Triceratops specimens still immature and showing signs of a first development of distinct Torosaurus frill holes. During maturation, the skull frill would have been greatly lengthened and holes would have appeared in it. In 2011, 2012, and 2013, however, studies of external features of known specimens have claimed that morphological differences between the two genera preclude their synonymy. The main problems are a lack of good transitional forms, the apparent existence of authentic Torosaurus subadults, different skull proportions independent of maturation, and hole formation at an adult stage not being part of a normal ceratopsian maturation sequence. Consequently, newer research has favored the interpretation that Torosaurus is indeed a separate genus from Triceratops.

== Discovery and species ==
In 1891, two years after the naming of Triceratops, a pair of ceratopsian skulls with elongated frills bearing holes were found by John Bell Hatcher in Niobrara County in southeastern Wyoming. Hatcher's employer, paleontologist Professor Othniel Charles Marsh, coined the genus Torosaurus for them.

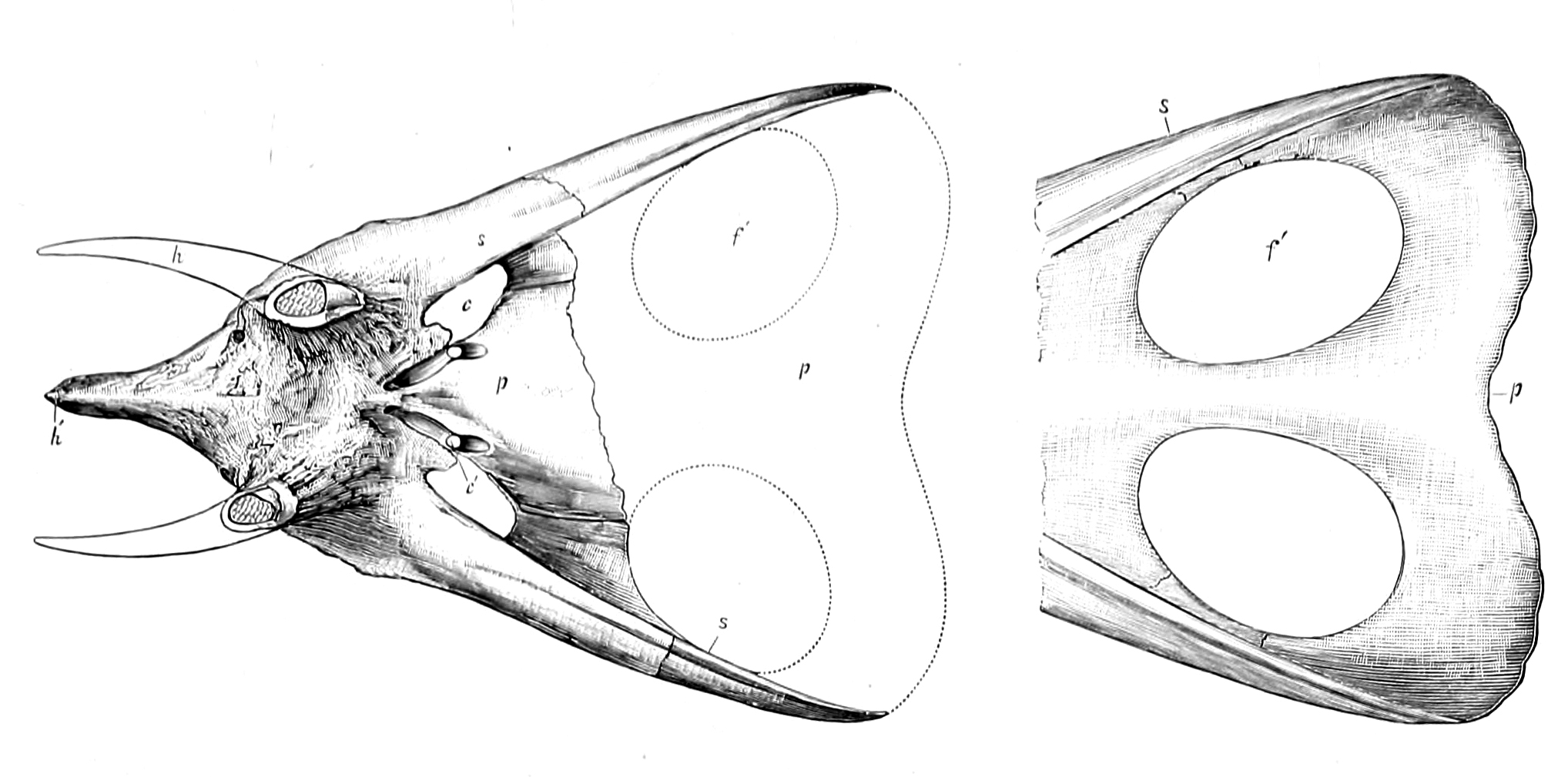
Marsh's original illustrations of the skulls of T. latus and its synonym T. gladius

The name Torosaurus is frequently mistranslated as "bull lizard" from the Latin noun taurus or the Spanish word toro, but is much more likely derived from the Greek verb τορέω (toreo), which means "to perforate". The allusion is to the fenestrae, "window-like" holes, in the elongated frill, which have traditionally served to distinguish it from the solid frill of Triceratops. In 1896, Marsh explained: "The open perforations in the parietal, which have suggested the name Torosaurus, readily separate this genus from all the gigantic species hitherto known in the Ceratopsidae..." (pg. 216).

Two Torosaurus species have been identified:

- T. latus Marsh, 1891 (type species). Latus means "the wide one" in Latin, in reference to the frill.
- T. utahensis (Gilmore, 1946) Lawson, 1976

Another species was subsequently regarded as identical to T. latus:

- T. gladius Marsh, 1891. Gladius is "sword" in Latin, in reference to the elongated shape of the squamosal.

T. latus was based on holotype YPM 1830, which is a partial skull. The holotype of T. gladius was specimen YPM 1831, which is an even larger skull. Both fossils were found in the Lance Formation of the late Maastrichtian. Similar specimens found in Wyoming, Montana, South Dakota, North Dakota, Colorado, Utah, and Saskatchewan have since been referred to Torosaurus. Those that can be identified with some certainty include ANSP 15192 (a smaller individual in South Dakota uncovered by Edwin Harris Colbert in 1944), MPM VP6841 (a partial skeleton with a skull mounted at the Milwaukee Public Museum), SMM P97.6.1 (a skull lacking the snout), and two partial skulls from the Hell Creek Formation reported in 2002: MOR 981 (discovered in 1998) and MOR 1122 (from 2001). Fragmentary remains that could possibly be identified as Torosaurus have been found in the Big Bend Region of Texas and the San Juan Basin of New Mexico. Paleontologists have observed that Torosaurus specimens are uncommon in the fossil record, with specimens of Triceratops being much more abundant.

Torosaurus utahensis was originally described as Arrhinoceratops? utahensis by Charles Whitney Gilmore in 1946, based on specimen USNM 15583 (a frill fragment from Emery County, Utah). In 1976, it was renamed to Torosaurus utahensis by Douglas Lawson. Review by Robert Sullivan et al. in 2005 left it as Torosaurus utahensis and somewhat older than T. latus. In 2008, Rebecca Hunt referred considerable additional material to this species. Research has not yet been published on whether T. utahensis should be regarded as a new genus or, as has been suggested for T. latus, the mature growth stage of a species of Triceratops.

== Description ==
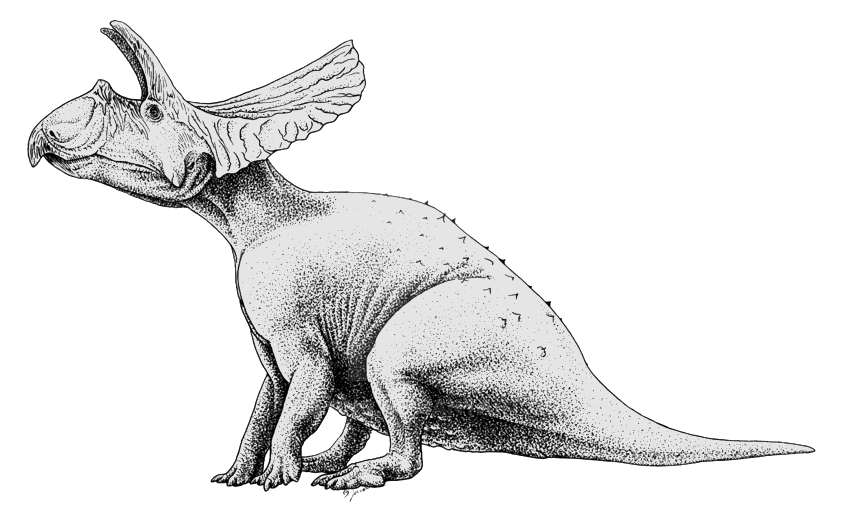
Restoration of T. latus

The individuals referred to Torosaurus are all large, comparable to the largest Triceratops specimens, measuring 7.5 to 9 m (25 to 30 ft) long and weighing 6–11 metric tons (6.6–12.1 short tons). Due to the elongated frill, the skull length is especially considerable. Hatcher estimated the skull of YPM 1830 at 2.2 m (7.2 ft) and that of YPM 1831 at 2.35 m (7.7 ft). In 1933, Richard Swann Lull increased this to 2.4 m (7.9 ft) and 2.57 m (8.4 ft), respectively. Based on this, Torosaurus was seen as having the longest skull of any known land animal. In 1998, however, Thomas Lehman claimed that a Pentaceratops specimen possessed a partial skull that would have been 2.9 m (9.5 ft) long in life. This was again doubted by Nicholas Longrich who, in 2011, named this exemplar as a separate genus, Titanoceratops, and concluded its skull had been reconstructed as too long. Furthermore, in 2006, Andrew Farke had pointed out that the new skulls described by him were even longer on average than Hatcher's original two. MOR 1122 has a length of 2.52 m (8.3 ft) and MOR 981 has a length of 2.77 m (9.1 ft). The well preserved skull of the Torosaurus specimen nicknamed "Adam", first put on display in 2023, is the largest known at 3 m (9.8 ft) long. T. utahensis is estimated to have a possible maximum skull length of 2.9 metres (9.5 ft).

In 2006, Farke established some diagnostic traits of Torosaurus. The frill is extremely long in comparison to the remainder of the skull. The rear edge of the frill bears ten or more epiperietals, or triangular osteoderms. A midline triangular osteoderm is absent. Likewise, no osteoderm straddles the parietal-squamosal boundary. The parietal bone is thin and pierced by parietal fenestrae in the form of circular or transversely ovular openings. The parietal bone is about 20% wider than it is long. Farke identified a single trait in which T. latus differed from both Triceratops horridus and T. utahensis. Its squamosal bore a conspicuous ridge on the edge with the parietal combined with a deep longitudinal trough parallel to it.

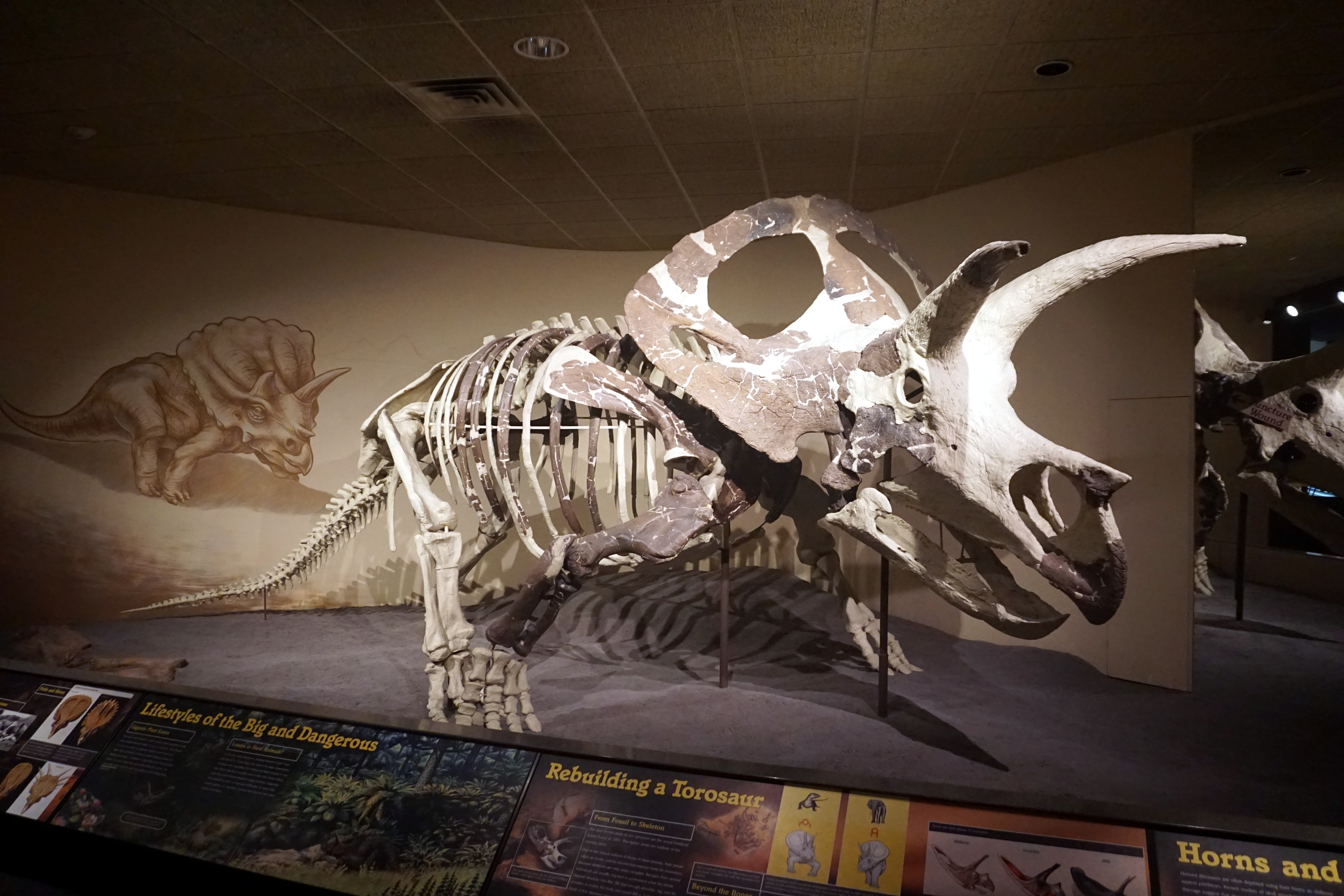
Mounted skeleton (MPM VP6841), Milwaukee

Farke pointed out that the known Torosaurus specimens are rather variable. The orbital "brow" horns are sometimes large and curved to the front, as with MOR 981, or sometimes short and straight, as shown by MOR 1122 and ANSP 15191. Also, the position of these horns differs, as they are often located directly on top of the eye socket. With YPM 1831, however, they originate at the rear edge of the orbit. Likewise, there is a variation in the form of the nose horn. YPM 1831 and, to a lesser extent, YPM 1830 have a straight, upright nasal horn, but MOR 981, ANSP 15192, and especially MOR 1122 possess a low bump at most. The frill differs too, as ANSP 15192 and YPM 1830 have a shield curving upwards at the rear, but the frill of YPM 1831 is nearly flat, though this could be an artefact of restoration. The frill of YPM 1831 is also heart-shaped, with a clear midline notch, whereas the rear edge of the other specimens is straight. The frill proportions are quite variable. With YPM 1831, the length-width ratio is 1.26, but MOR 981 has a shield 2.28 times longer than it is wide. The number of triangular osteoderms is difficult to assess, as most fossils seem to have lost them. MOR 981 and MOR 1122 have ten and twelve epiparietals, respectively. YPM 1831 has been restored with a fontanelle in the skull roof, which is possibly authentic. Farke also concluded that the degree of variability did not exceed that shown by related genera.

Farke stressed that, apart from the frill, no systematic differences could be found between Torosaurus and Triceratops. All Torosaurus specimens are similar in that they lack a truly long nasal horn and a horizontal arterial groove at the front base of said horn, but Triceratops fossils with the same combination of traits are not uncommon. In 2008, Hunt concluded that T. utahensis, contrary to T. latus, but similar to Triceratops, possessed a midline epiparietal.

== Classification ==
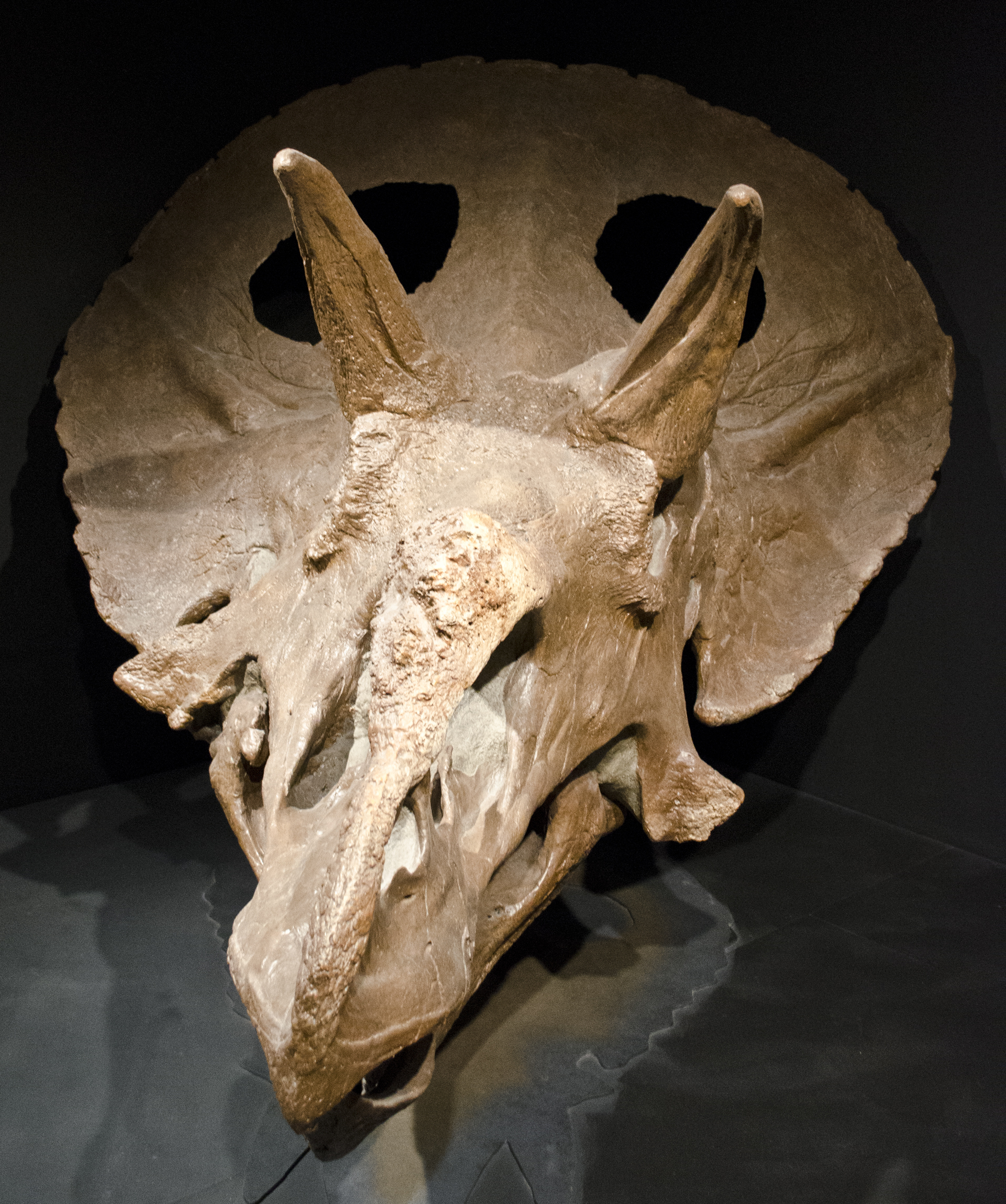
Specimen MOR 1122

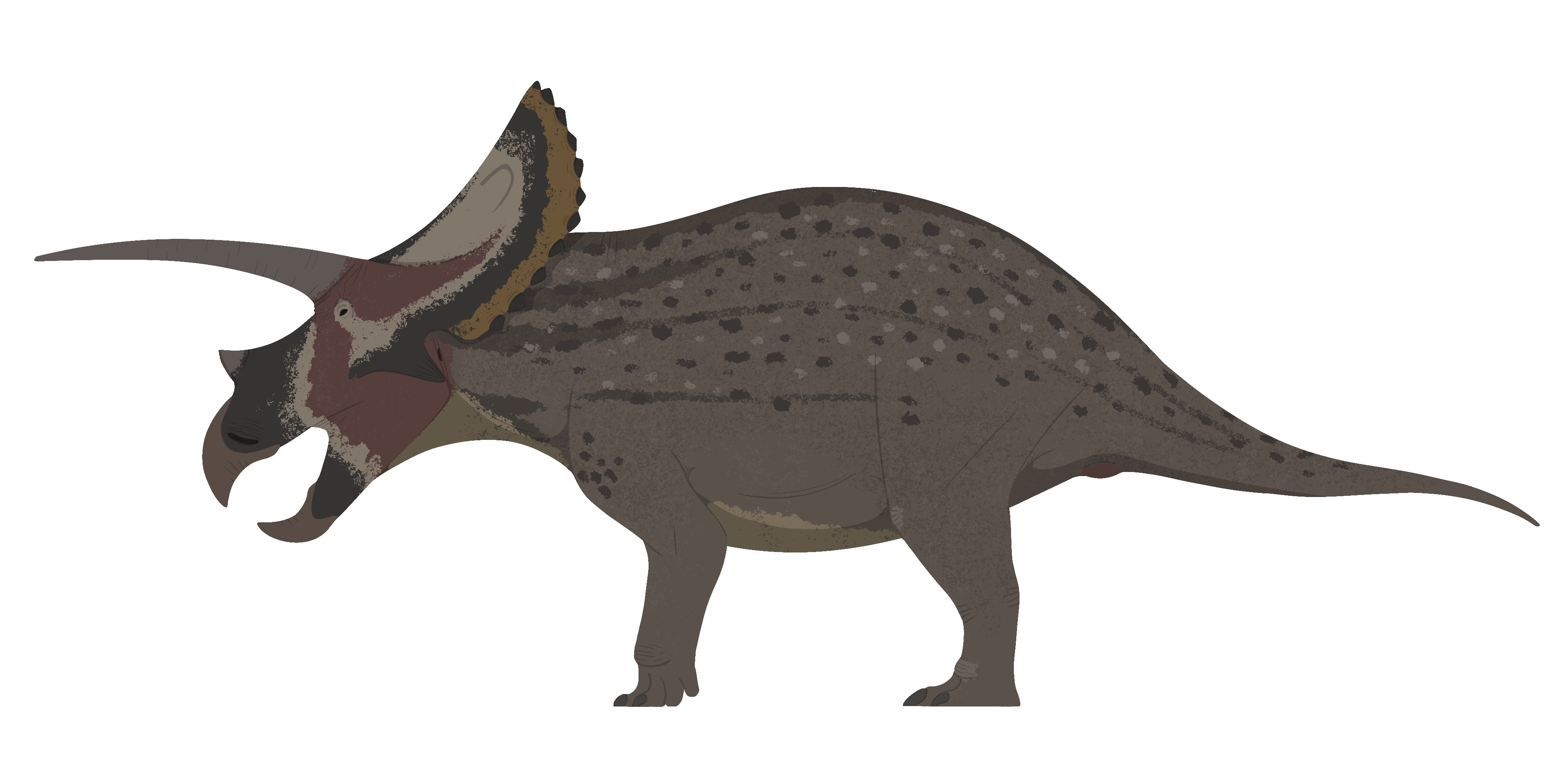
Restoration of T. utahensis

Below is a ceratopsid cladogram based on the phylogenetic analysis conducted by Sampson et al. in 2010:

- Ceratopsidae
  - Centrosaurinae
  - Chasmosaurinae
    - Chasmosaurus
    - - Mojoceratops
      - - Agujaceratops
        - - - Utahceratops
            - Pentaceratops
          - - Coahuilaceratops
            - - - Kosmoceratops
                - Vagaceratops
              - - Anchiceratops
                - - Arrhinoceratops
                  - Triceratopsini
                    - Ojoceratops
                    - Eotriceratops
                    - - Torosaurus
                      - - Nedoceratops
                        - Triceratops

In 1891, Marsh placed Torosaurus in the Ceratopsidae family of Ceratopsia (Greek: "horned faces"), a group of herbivorous dinosaurs with parrot-like beaks that thrived in North America and Asia during the Jurassic and Cretaceous Periods.

Torosaurus has, with its long frill, traditionally been classified in Chasmosaurinae. It was seen as a late member of a line descending from Anchiceratops or Arrhinoceratops. It was thus placed in a different branch from Triceratops which, well into the 1980s, was seen as a member of Centrosaurinae because of its short frill. However, in the 1990s, exact cladistic analysis showed that both genera were chasmosaurines. Recent analyses invariably show a close relationship between Torosaurus and Triceratops.

=== Possible synonymy with Triceratops ===
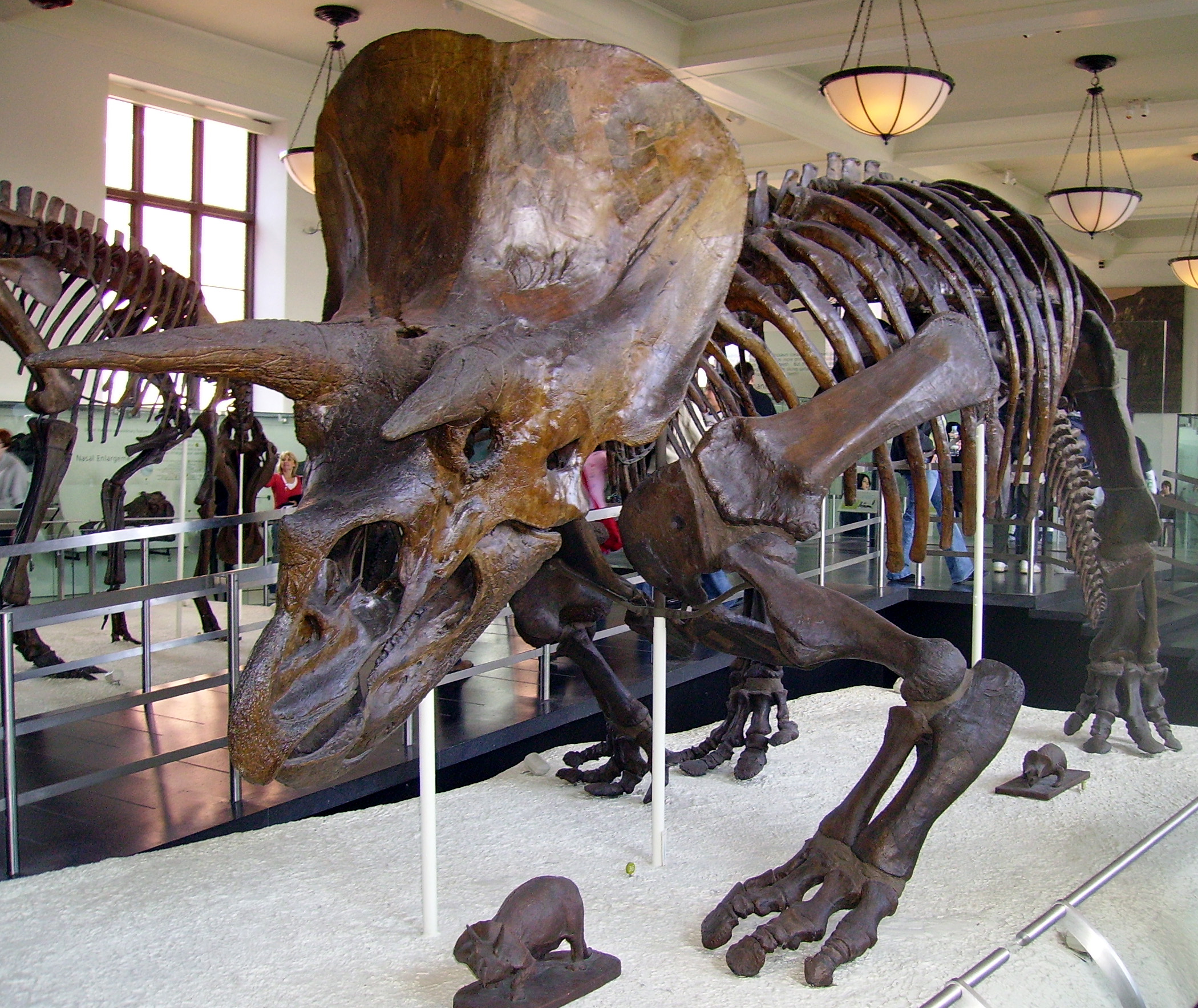
A mounted specimen of Triceratops, conventionally considered a distinct genus from Torosaurus

During the late 2000s and early 2010s, a debate has sparked over the possibility that Torosaurus might be identical to Triceratops. In the Maastrichtian age of Laramidia, two closely related chasmosaurines shared the same habitat. The only discernible difference between them was the form of the frill. No Torosaurus juveniles are known, but a considerable number of Triceratops juveniles have been found. Triceratops differs from other chasmosaurines in the retention as an adult of a juvenile trait. Adults retain the short squamosals, a case of paedomorphosis. In 2009, John Scannella, investigating dinosaur ontogeny in the Hell Creek Formation of Montana, concluded that this situation could be best explained by the hypothesis that Triceratops and Torosaurus were growth stages of a single genus. The Torosaurus specimens would be fully mature individuals of Triceratops. Torosaurus would be a junior synonym of Triceratops, the latter name having priority.

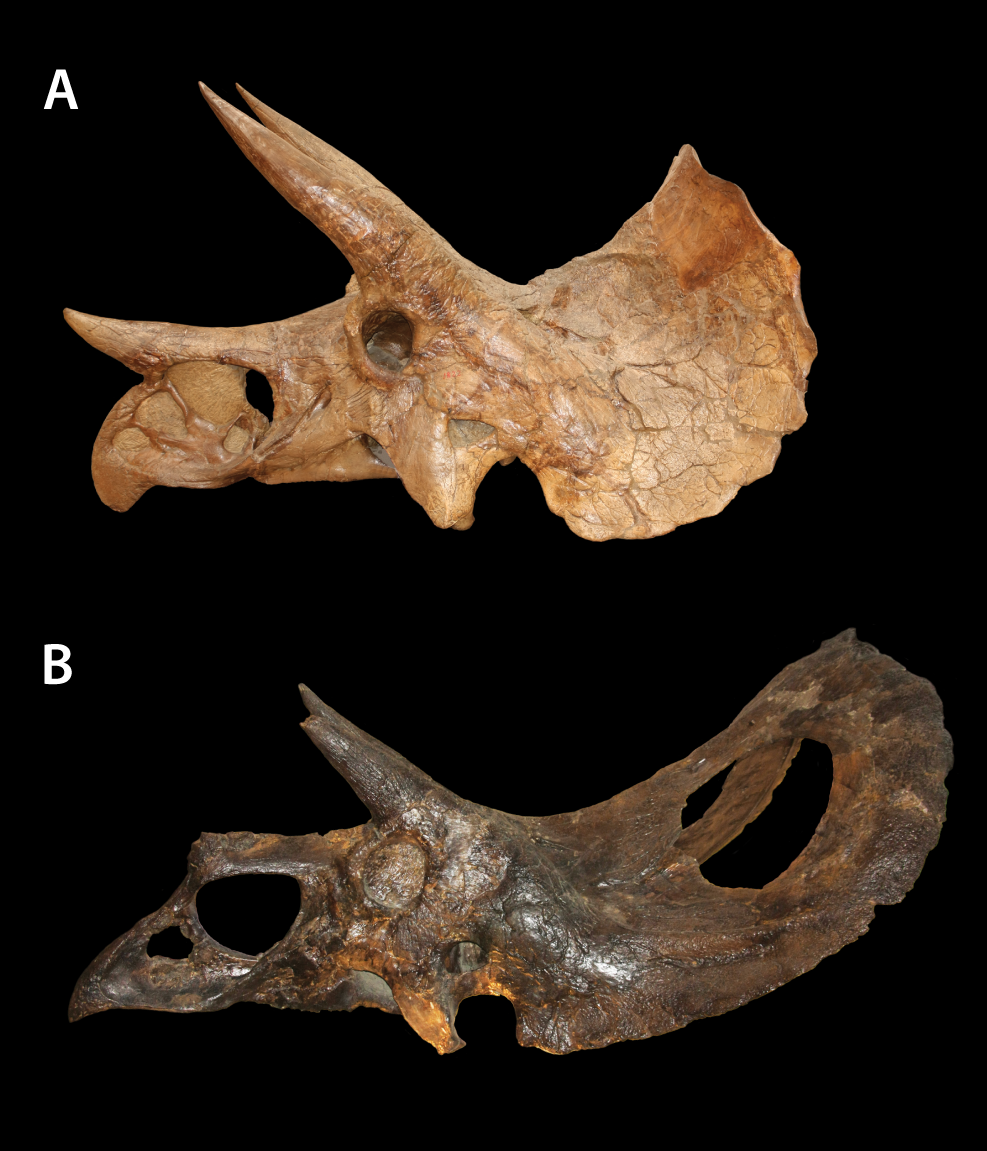
According to the "toromorph" hypothesis, Triceratops subadults (A, Triceratops prorsus holotype YPM 1822) would have gotten longer frills with holes as shown by B, Torosaurus latus specimen ANSP 15192

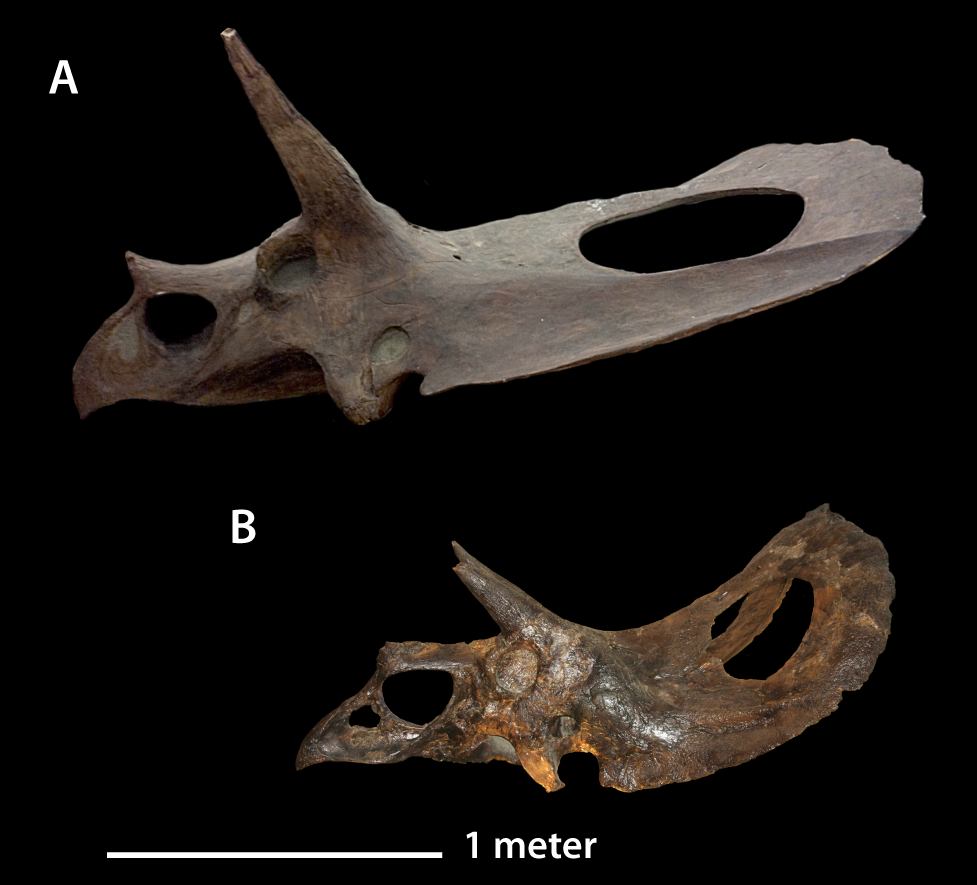
The end phase would have consisted of an enormously large and flat frill as exemplified by specimen YPM 1831 (A), its size shown by comparison to ANSP 15192 (B), an early adult

In 2010, Scanella and Jack Horner, Scannella's mentor at Montana State University, published research on the growth patterns in thirty-eight skull specimens (twenty-nine of Triceratops, nine of Torosaurus) from the Hell Creek formation. They concluded that Torosaurus indeed represents the mature form of Triceratops. Horner stressed that the frill of ceratopsian skulls consisted of metaplastic bone. A characteristic of metaplastic bone is that it can lengthen and shorten over time, extending and resorbing to form new shapes. Significant development is seen even in those skulls already identified as Triceratops, Horner observed, "where the horn orientation is backwards in juveniles and forward in adults". Approximately 50% of all subadult Triceratops skulls have two thin areas in the frill that correspond with the placement of the "holes" in Torosaurus skull frills, which are surrounded by mature granular bone, suggesting that these developed to offset the weight that would otherwise have been added as maturing Triceratops individuals grew longer frills. Horner made this part of a larger argument that, in general, many purported dinosaur species might have been growth stages of other known species. With old Triceratops individuals, the frill would have begun to lengthen considerably, causing it to flatten and widen at its rear edge. At the same time, parietal fenestrae would have appeared, resulting in the typical chasmosaurine frill shape.

Scanella and Horner recognised that not all data were easily explained by their hypothesis. For these, they advanced auxiliary hypotheses. One problem was that if Torosaurus were the normal last maturation phase of Triceratops, which they called the "toromorph phase", it would be expected that Torosaurus fossils were quite common, whereas in fact they are fairly rare. They explained this by a high mortality of subadults and the possibility that old animals preferentially lived on heights where erosion prevented fossilization . A second problem was the size range of Torosaurus specimens, which seems to suggest the existence of authentic Torosaurus subadults. Of these, they claimed that the bone structure indicated a fully mature age, with the size difference being the apparent result of individual variation. A third possible objection was the seeming lack of transitional forms between individuals with and without parietal holes. These fenestrae are always perfectly shaped, not like incipient perforations. To counter it, they pointed to specimen USNM 2412, the holotype of the contentious Nedoceratops, as an example of precisely such a transitional form. The problematic traits of this genus would simply reflect its being in the first stages of transforming into a "toromorph". A last problem was offered by the number of osteoderms on the frill edge. With Triceratops, there are typically five epiparietals, including a midline osteoderm. With Torosaurus, there are ten or twelve, a midline epiparietal being absent. Also the number of episquamosals on the side edge of the frill differs (five with Triceratops, six or seven with Torosaurus). This was explained by the assumption that the number of epoccipitals increased during maturation. Also, it was pointed out that both number and position of the osteoderms are variable with Triceratops. This is shown through specimen MOR 2923, which has six epiparietals, but lacks a midline one.

Scannella and Horner's conclusions have not been widely accepted. Several experts, though admitting the possibility that the "toromorph" hypothesis is correct, have denied that this is probable. The hypothesis was directly challenged by a 2011 paper by Andrew Farke and a 2012 paper by Nicholas Longrich. In 2011, Farke redescribed the problematic Nedoceratops hatcheri as an aged or diseased individual of its own genus. Scannella and Horner argued for its identification with Triceratops. Farke pointed out that the irregular holes in the Nedoceratops frill, far from piercing thinning bone, were surrounded by thick swellings. Farke further concluded that several facts were difficult to reconcile with the proposed development of a Triceratops into a Torosaurus. In general, the number of epoccipitals in ceratopsians does not increase when the frill grows. Even though the number of episquamosals is often variable, there seems to be no relation with size because some juveniles already show the maximum number. Apparently, this is a matter of individual variation, not ontogeny. Likewise, with Ceratopia in general, the formation of holes in the frill is not related to age, as even the youngest individuals often possess the parietal fenestrae. Farke explained the thin bone areas on the frill of Triceratops, the purported location of incipient holes, to be muscle attachment sites. There would be no consistent relation between holes and a granular bone structure. Many Triceratops specimens have frills with a deeply veined surface, indicating considerable age. The bone of their frills would have to be rejuvenated and then become granulated again in order for hole formation to begin, which Farke considered to be an unlikely sequence. Finally, Farke pointed out that specimen YPM 1831, despite its enormous size, was apparently not yet fully-grown, as shown by its unfused sutures and smooth bone texture. Thus, it seemed to represent an authentic Torosaurus subadult.

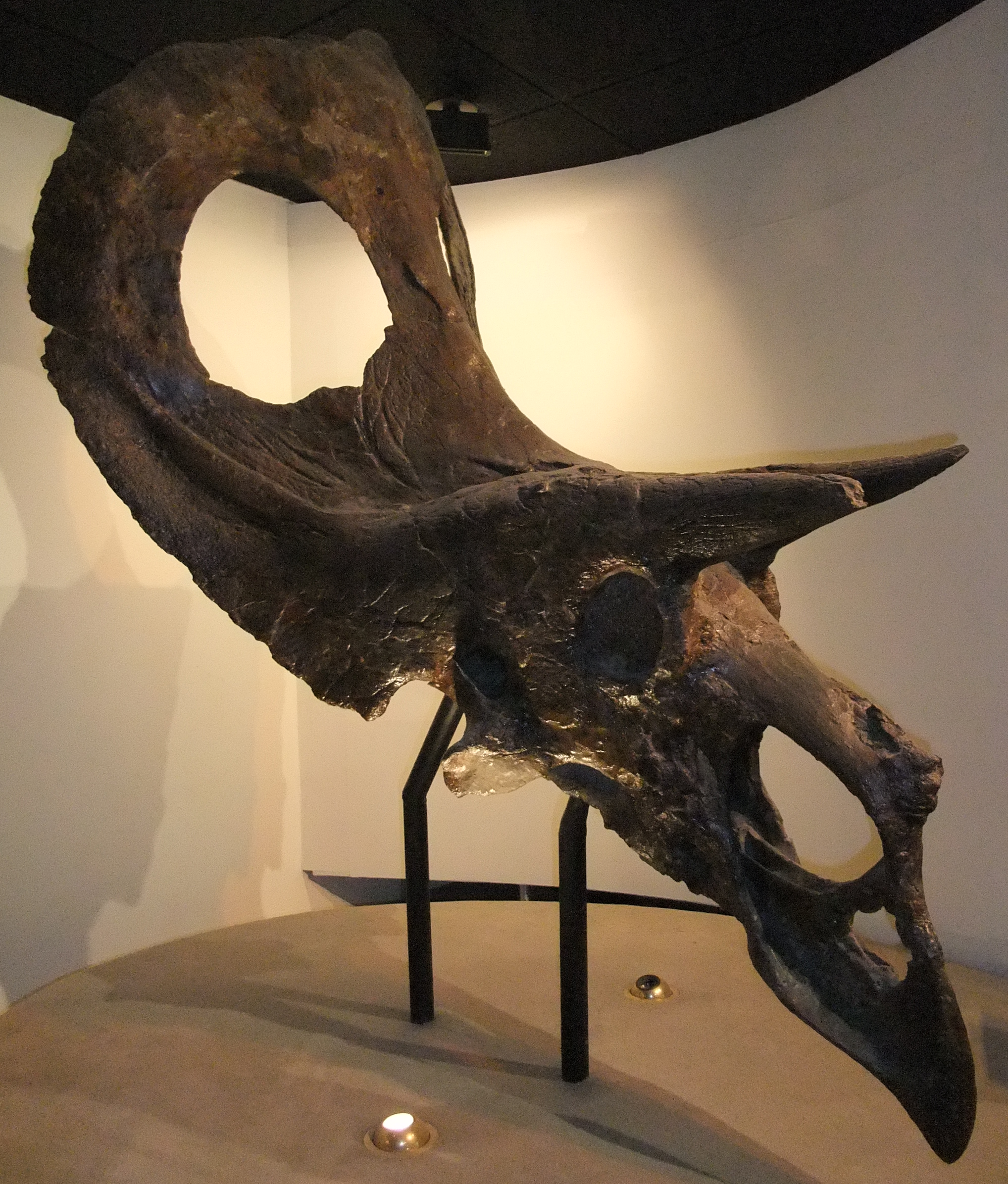
Specimen ANSP 15192 might, according to Longrich, be a young female adult

The same year, Scanella and Horner responded to some of Farke's critique. They admitted that USNM 2412, in view of its pathologies, was not an ideal candidate for a transitional form, but stressed that, apart from swellings, the holes in its frill were also bordered by granular and thinning bone. Taking all the evidence into consideration, they thought it much more likely that Nedoceratops represented a diseased individual of Triceratops than a genus of its own. They also pointed to Triceratops specimens showing the precise combination of veined, granular, and young striated bone that Farke had considered to be improbable. The idea that the thin areas on Triceratops frills were muscle attachment sites was rejected by them because the bone at these points did not show the rugose surface typical for such an attachment. For the difference in the number of epoccipitals, they offered two additional explanations. The osteoderm tips of old individuals might have eroded during life in such a way that each osteoderm gave the impression of two being present. In this way, the normal number of five or six Triceratops epiparietals could have doubled to ten or twelve, precisely the amount seen with the Torosaurus specimens. Alternatively, the Torosaurus latus specimens, having been found in older layers, might, in a process of anagenesis, represent an early stage of Triceratops evolution. The oldest specimen that can be dated, MOR 1122, has twelve epiparietals, while the younger MOR 981 possesses ten, seeming to indicate an evolutionary sequence in which the number of epiparietals gradually decreased.

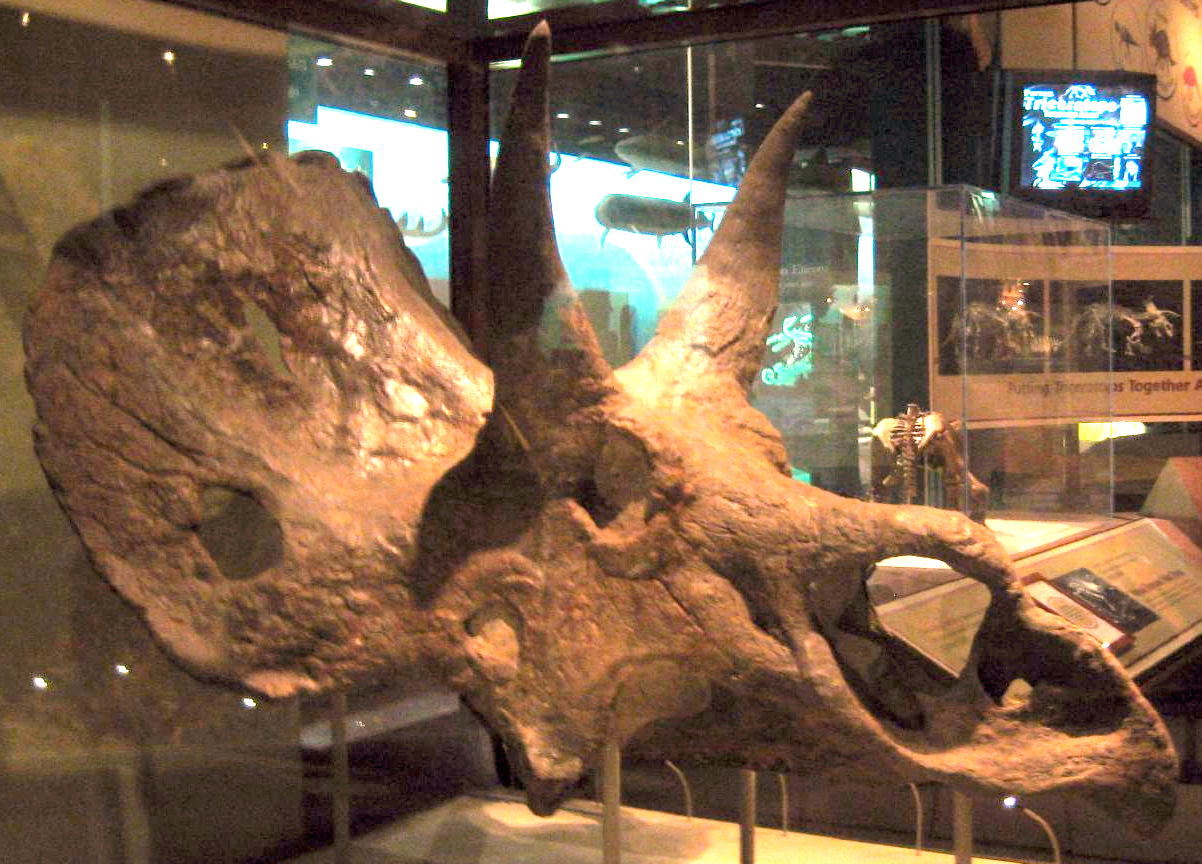
Scanella & Horner saw Nedoceratops as an ontogenetic transitional form between Triceratops and Torosaurus

In 2012, Longrich investigated the problem by applying the principle of falsification. From any valid scientific hypothesis, predictions can be derived by which it can be tested. Longrich argued that the "toromorph" hypothesis implied three such predictions. Firstly, if Torosaurus were identical to Triceratops, their fossils should be found in the same locations. In fact, their geographical ranges do not perfectly coincide. In the very north, no Torosaurus fossils have been found, while from the south, only Torosaurus utahensis is known. However, this situation could be an artefact of the relative scarcity of Torosaurus remains and imperfect sampling. Longrich therefore concluded that the hypothesis was corroborated by the first prediction. Secondly, the hypothesis predicted that all Torosaurus specimens would be adults, while no Triceratops specimens would be very old. According to Longrich, this last point had not yet been established. Admittedly, in 2011, Horner had published a histological study showing that all Triceratops specimens investigated possessed a subadult bone structure, but the sample had been too small to allow for a valid generalisation to all Triceratops fossils. To better test the prediction, Longrich proposed a list of twenty-four external skull traits, by which specimens could be checked regarding their level of skull element fusion and their maturation. Thirty-six specimens were investigated upon applying these criteria. It transpired that the fusion typically took place in a certain sequence, providing additional information about their age. Indeed, by these criteria, most Torosaurus specimens were very old. However, there were two exceptions. The small individual ANSP 15192 was a relatively young adult, as shown by the lack of fusion of the snout bones. The youngest specimen was YPM 1831, with an unfused snout, epijugal, and occipital condyle. Furthermore, it had lost all of its frill osteoderms because they apparently had not been fused yet, while the frill edge had the external appearance of growing, young bone. On the other hand, Longrich found that ten of the Triceratops skulls investigated had attained the same level of maturation as the most aged Torosaurus specimens. Longrich concluded that the test of the second prediction refuted the hypothesis. The third prediction was that transitional forms could be found between Torosaurus and Triceratops. Longrich considered the claim that the thin areas on Triceratops frills were precursors of parietal fenestrae, as the strongest proof of a transitional phase. However, he pointed out that these structures differed in position. The Triceratops depressions are partly located on the squamosal, while the Torosaurus holes are fully surrounded by the parietal. Furthermore, the depressions are bordered by much thicker bone, while the Torosaurus holes are surrounded by thin bone. Longrich concluded that the hypothesis failed regarding the third prediction. Being refuted in two of the three predictions, the hypothesis should be rejected.

Longrich also suggested some additional objections to the "toromorph" hypothesis. There are no transitional forms known regarding the number of epiparietals. Also, it is hard to see how their number could have increased, as they occupied the full frill edge and would, in a metaplastic growth process, simply have increased their size and the remainder of the frill. The proposed splitting of osteoderms by erosion has only been established with episquamosals, never with epiparietals. Torosaurus has a squamosal that is thickened at the inner side and concave at the outer surface, while the Triceratops squamosal is concave at the inner side and flat on top. Transitional forms are unknown. The Torosaurus squamosal is also, independent from absolute size, much more elongated. Longrich pointed out that when Torosaurus and Triceratops specimens are combined to create a single growth sequence, as Scanella and Horner had done, Torosaurus specimens ANSP 15192 and YPM 1831 were outliers relative to the regression line because their squamosals were more elongated than could be explained by allometry. Longrich admitted that the fact that Horner, in his histological study, could only find Triceratops subadults was suggestive, but offered the alternative explanation that Triceratops differed from its relatives in retaining a relative young bone structure until old age. On the other hand, bone remodelling is not a reliable estimator of maturity in view of experimental studies demonstrating that differences in the mechanical strain conditions of various bones can significantly alter the rate or degree of such remodelling and may generate the illusion of old bone tissue. Longrich foresaw that Scanella and Horner would respond to his second test of their hypothesis by claiming that its results were caused by individual variation. According to Longrich, the importance of this factor was limited however: e.g. the size difference between ANSP 15192 and YPM 1831 had better been explained by sexual dimorphism, the former possibly being a young adult female and the latter being a subadult male.

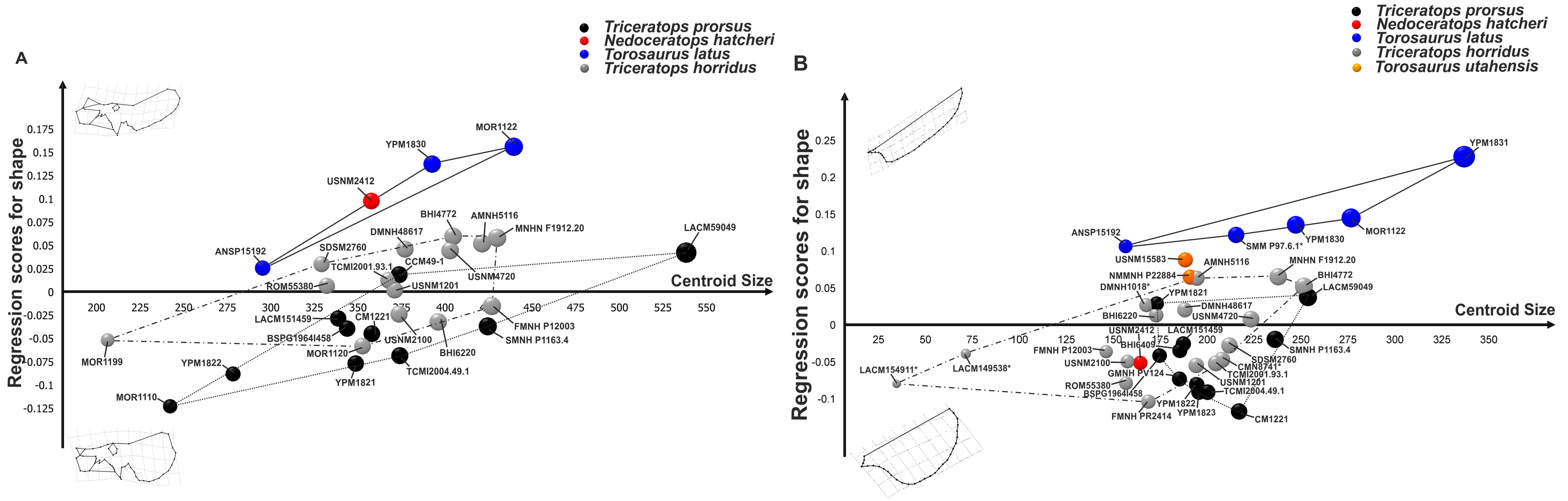
Principal Component Analysis and linear regression between shape and size performed on skulls (A) and squamosals (B), showing that Torosaurus, independent of size, occupied a different morphospace than Triceratops horridus or Triceratops prorsus

In 2013, Farke and Leonardo Maiorino published morphometric research, a statistical analysis of the morphospace (shape space) describing the variation of the Torosaurus, Triceratops horridus, Triceratops prorsus, and Nedoceratops skulls correlated with maturation. They concluded that Torosaurus latus skulls throughout maturation retained a different form from T. horridus and T. prorsus, the last two species showing an overlapping in their proportions. This is even true when the frill shape is disregarded. Nedoceratops proved, except for size, not to be a plausible transitional form between Torosaurus and Triceratops horridus. Farke and Maiorino admitted that the low number of Torosaurus specimens reduced the reliability of these results, but concluded that Torosaurus and Triceratops were separate taxa, though allowing for the possibility of anagenesis, i.e. the several taxa forming a single chronospecies line of descent, given the lack of good stratigraphic data.

The hypothesis that the Torosaurus latus specimens might represent a "toromorph" phase of Triceratops maturation has raised the question of whether the second Torosaurus species, Torosaurus utahensis, is a "toromorph" as well. This issue has been complicated by the lack of good fossil material, as most specimens consist of isolated bones. T. utahensis was largely referred to Torosaurus because of elongated squamosals, indicating a long frill. The number of epiparietals and the size, location, or even existence of parietal fenestrae are unknown. Researchers have claimed that distinct juvenile Torosaurus have been excavated from a bonebed in the Javelina Formation of Big Bend National Park, basing their identification as Torosaurus cf. utahensis on their proximity to an adult with a characteristic Torosaurus parietal. Scanella and Horner concluded that only future finds could solve this problem. They suggested that this taxon, which extends the Torosaurus range southwards of that of Triceratops, might represent a separate chasmosaurine genus or a third Triceratops species. Farke's 2013 morphometric study was inconclusive on this point, with T. utahensis morphospace falling in between Triceratops and Torosaurus latus and not well separated from either.

In 2022, Mallon et al. argued that two specimens found in Canada's Frenchman and Scollard Formations, EM P16.1. (at Eastend Historical Museum in Saskatchewan) and UALVP 1646 (at the University of Alberta), are subadults and can be referred to Torosaurus, this indicating that it is a valid taxon. The same study also noted that Torosaurus indeed lived during the Late Maastrichtian.

== See also ==
- Timeline of ceratopsian research
