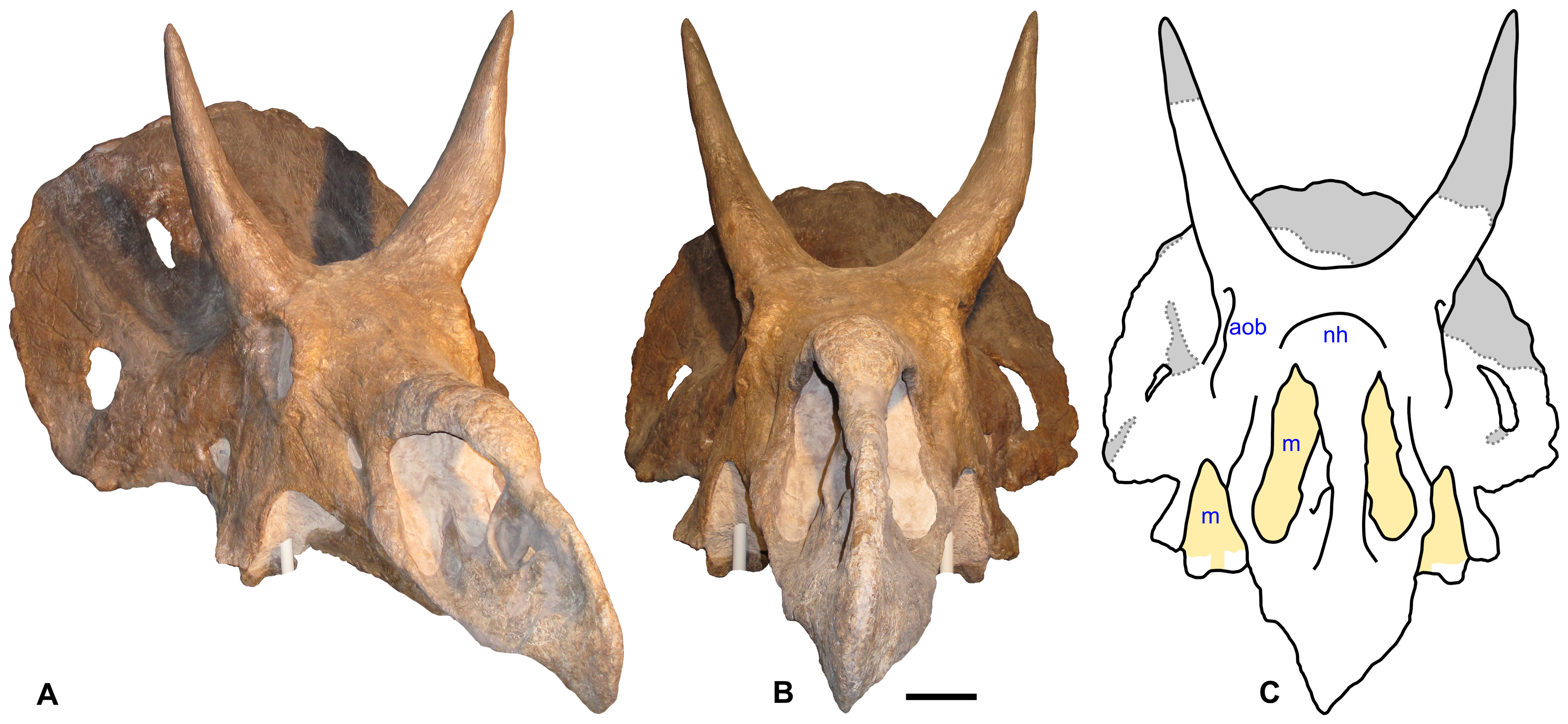
- Skull from multiple angles

Scientific classification
- Kingdom: Animalia
- Phylum: Chordata
- Class: Reptilia
- Clade: Dinosauria
- Clade: †Ornithischia
- Clade: †Ceratopsia
- Family: †Ceratopsidae
- Subfamily: †Chasmosaurinae
- Tribe: †Triceratopsini
- Genus: †Nedoceratops; Ukrainsky, 2007
- Species: †N. hatcheri

Binomial name
- †Nedoceratops hatcheri (Lull vide Hatcher, 1905); Originally Diceratops, preoccupied by Förster, 1868

Synonyms
- Diceratops Lull vide Hatcher, 1905 (preoccupied); Diceratops (subgenus) Lull, 1933; Diceratus Mateus, 2008

= Nedoceratops =

Nedoceratops Temporal range: Late Cretaceous, 67–66 Ma

Extinct genus of dinosaurs

Nedoceratops (meaning "insufficient horned face") is a controversial genus of ceratopsid dinosaur from the Late Cretaceous period Lance Formation of North America. It is known only from a single skull discovered in Wyoming. Its status is the subject of ongoing debate among paleontologists: some authors consider Nedoceratops a valid, distinct taxon, while others consider it to be an unusual specimen of Triceratops.

== History of discovery ==
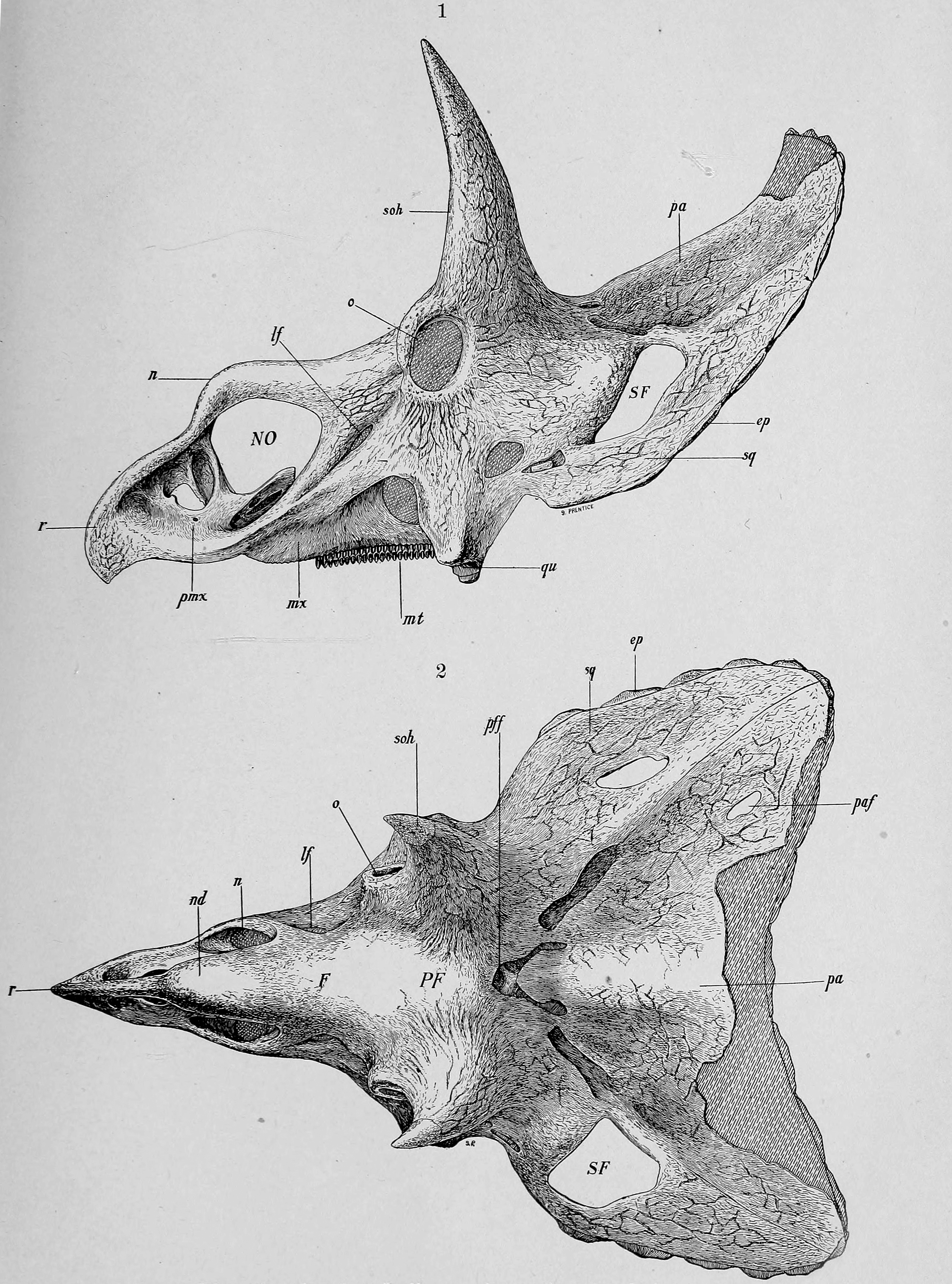
1905 diagram of the skull

The nearly complete skull USNM 2412, the holotype specimen of Nedoceratops hatcheri, was found in eastern Wyoming in 1891, in Niobrara County near Lightning Creek.

The paper that described Nedoceratops was originally part of O. C. Marsh's magnum opus, his Ceratopsidae monograph. Marsh died in 1899 before the work was completed, and John Bell Hatcher endeavored to complete the Triceratops section. However, he died of typhus in 1904 at the age of 42, leaving the paper still incomplete. It fell to Richard Swann Lull to complete the monograph in 1905, publishing Hatcher's description of a skull separately and giving it the name Diceratops hatcheri; Diceratops means "two horned face."

Since the Diceratops paper had been written by Hatcher, and Lull had only contributed the name and published the paper after Hatcher's death, Lull was not quite as convinced of the distinctiveness of Diceratops, thinking it primarily pathological. By 1933, Lull had second thoughts about Diceratops being a distinct genus and he put it in a subgenus of Triceratops: Triceratops (Diceratops) hatcheri, including T. obtusus; largely attributing its differences to being that of an aged individual.

Because the Diceratops name was already in use for a hymenopteran (Förster, 1868), Andrey Sergeevich Ukrainsky gave the animal its current name Nedoceratops in 2007. Unaware that Ukrainsky had already renamed the animal, Octávio Mateus coined another new name for it in 2008, Diceratus. Diceratus is thus a junior synonym of Nedoceratops.

Nedoceratops means "insufficient horned face". The "nedo" is the Russian prefix meaning "insufficient". The suffix "ceratops", common among ceratopsians, means "horned face". It was named in reference to its lack of a nasal horn.

== Description ==
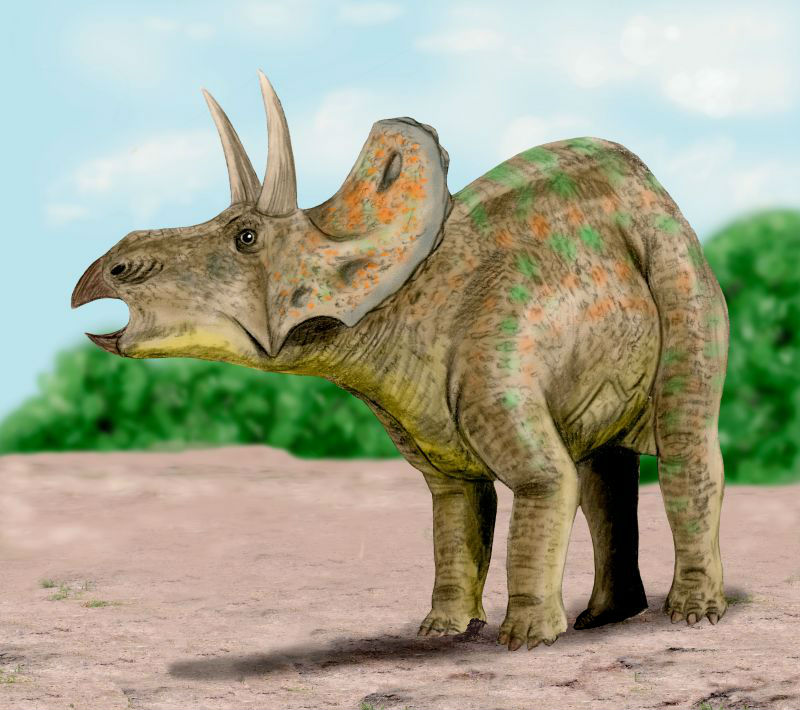
Life restoration showing the possibly pathological holes in the frills

The nearly complete skull known as USNM 2412 is the only fossil attributed to Nedoceratops hatcheri. Superficially, it resembles that of Triceratops, but on closer examination, it differs: specifically, the brow horns stand almost vertically compared to typical Triceratops skulls, and there also are several holes in the frill (a unique feature of Triceratops proper is that it has a solid, unperforated frill). However, at least some of these holes show evidence that they are the result of injury or disease. The nasal horn of this specimen is low and rounded, compared with the larger, pointed nose horns of typical Triceratops specimens, though this feature appears to be within the known range of individual variation for Triceratops.

== Classification ==
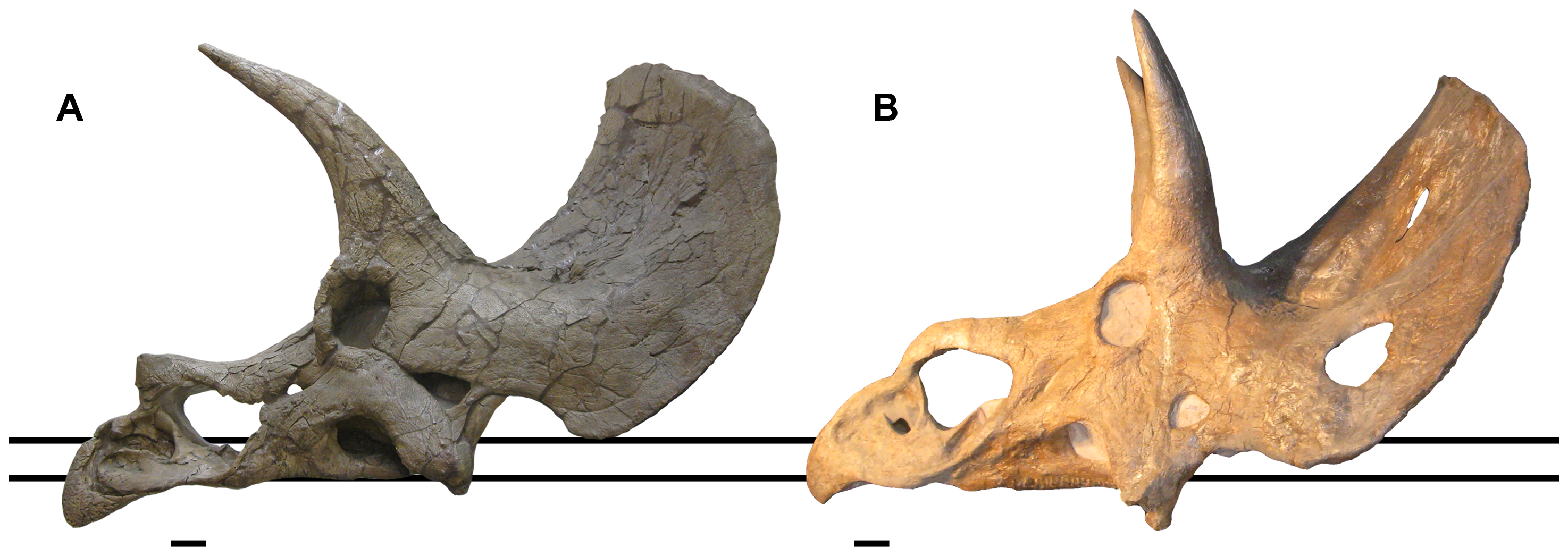
Skull comparisons of Triceratops (A. Left) and Nedoceratops (B. Right)

The type species is Nedoceratops hatcheri. Nedoceratops belonged to the Ceratopsia (the name is Latinised Greek for "horned faces"), a group of herbivorous dinosaurs with parrot-like beaks which thrived in North America and Asia during the Cretaceous Period, which ended roughly 66 million years ago. All ceratopsians became extinct at the end of this era.

Several authors have suggested that Nedoceratops may be directly ancestral to Triceratops, or perhaps its nearest relative. An ongoing debate concerns the status of Triceratops, Torosaurus, and Nedoceratops. In a series of publications, John B. Scannella and John R. Horner (2010 and 2011) and claimed that the USNM 2412 skull (i.e., of Nedoceratops) belonged to a "young adult" Triceratops. Evidence for this hypothesis included the shapes of the epoccipital and squamosal bones, and a neck frill (parietal bone) that had "incipient" openings (contrasting with no openings in subadult Triceratops and large openings in adult Triceratops formerly assigned to Torosaurus). These authors suggested that all three "genera" actually represent different aged individuals of Triceratops. In 2012, Farke proposed a counterargument, and suggested that the bone surface texture and shape of the horns of Nedoceratops indicate an "old adult". A follow-up study by Leonardo Maiorino and colleagues in 2013 using morphometrics found support for Triceratops and Torosaurus being distinct, valid taxa, with Nedoceratops occupying variable positions with respect to the other two but generally outside the range of variation, concluding that "the size of USNM 2412 is a plausible intermediate, but the shape is not."

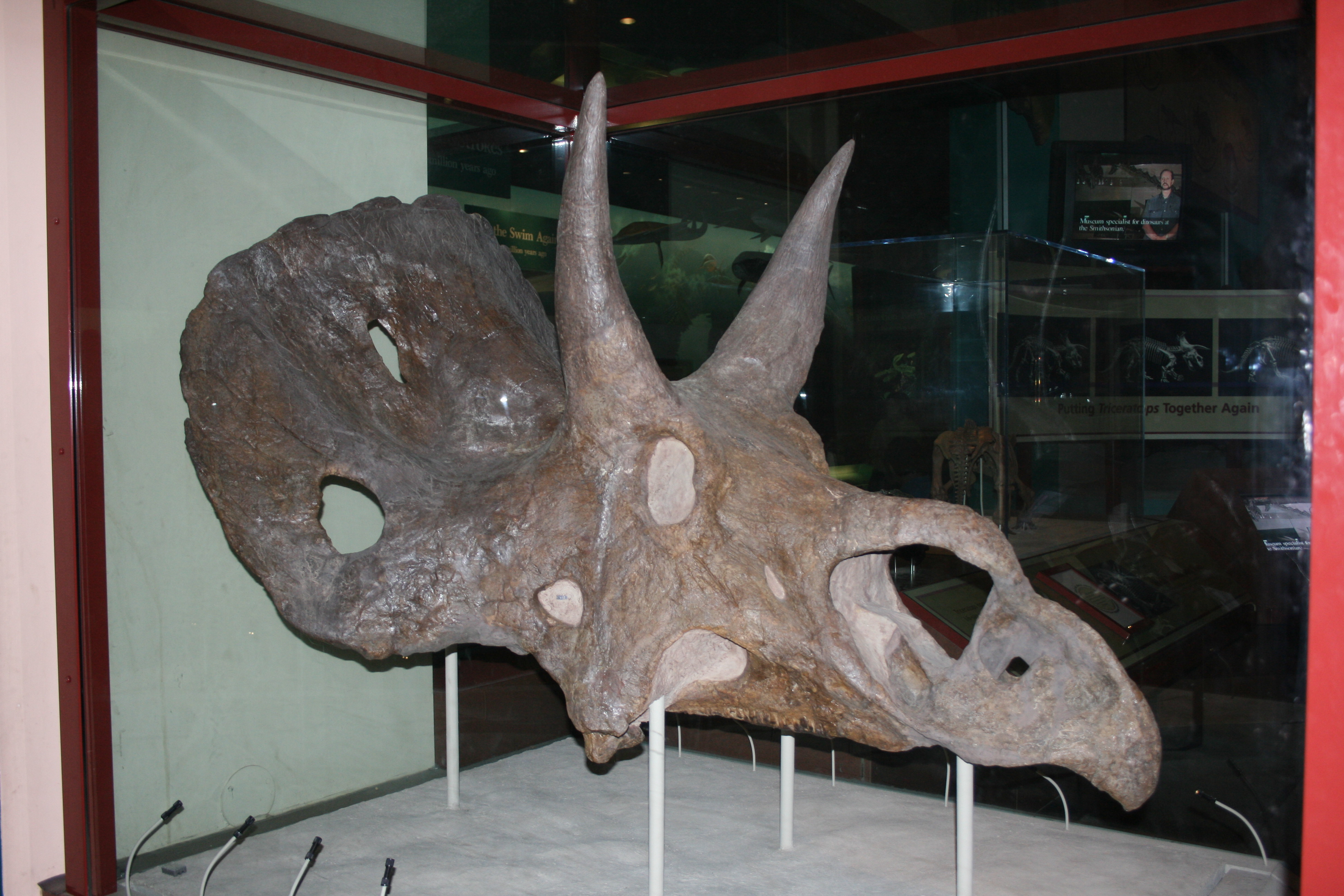
Skull exhibited at the Smithsonian

Another supposed difference between Nedoceratops and fossils referred to Triceratops horridus is the remarkably short, rounded nasal "horn". Scanella and Horner proposed that the nasal horn of the USNM 2412 skull could have been lost when the animal was alive or when it became fossilized. However, it has been noted the horns of ceratopsids show a great deal of variation between age groups and individuals, and some specimens more solidly attributed to T. horridus have a similar nasal horn shape. In most features- the short, saddle-shape frill, the s-shaped snout- the animal closely resembles Triceratops horridus.

It has been noted that many of the features that seem to separate Nedoceratops from Triceratops, and specifically Triceratops horridus, may be the result of pathology, injury, and/or deformation of the skull after burial. Two of the features that have been used to diagnose Nedoceratops - the position of the squamosal and the upright brow horns- are seen on one side of the skull, but not the other. This, along with the fact that the entire skull can be seen to be twisted when seen head-on, have been used to argue that these features result from post-mortem distortion of the fossil, rather than reflecting the anatomy of the animal during life. Furthermore, the presence of numerous holes in the frill suggests pathology due to injury or illness, the supposedly unique 'parietal fenestrae' may therefore be the result of an injury. Tanke & Farke (2007) noted that the supposed parietal fenestra had an irregular shape with swollen margins and an irregularly vascularized texture. This is similar to a parietal hole, also interpreted as the result of an injury by Marshall & Barreto (2001), in a specimen of Torosaurus. The frill is only preserved on one side, which makes it difficult to test this hypothesis.
