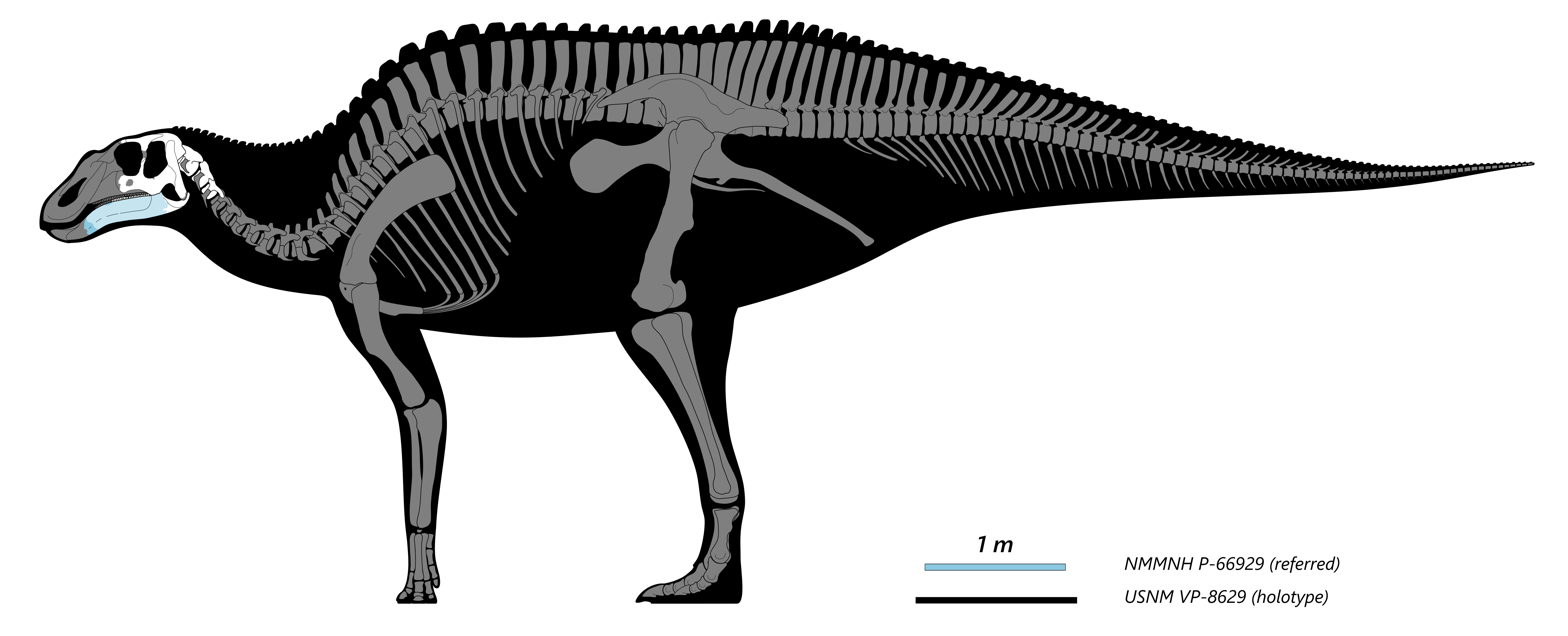
- Reconstructed skeleton illustrating fossils confidently assigned to Ahshislesaurus

Scientific classification
- Kingdom: Animalia
- Phylum: Chordata
- Class: Reptilia
- Clade: Dinosauria
- Clade: †Ornithischia
- Clade: †Ornithopoda
- Family: †Hadrosauridae
- Subfamily: †Saurolophinae
- Tribe: †Kritosaurini
- Genus: †Ahshislesaurus; Dalman et al., 2025
- Species: †A. wimani

Binomial name
- †Ahshislesaurus wimani Dalman et al., 2025

= Ahshislesaurus =

Ahshislesaurus Temporal range: Late Cretaceous (late Campanian), ~75.02 Ma

Genus of hadrosaurid dinosaurs

Ahshislesaurus is an extinct genus of saurolophine hadrosaurid dinosaurs known from the Late Cretaceous of what is now New Mexico, United States. It is known from a partial skull and three neck vertebrae discovered in 1916 and first described in 1935. Prior to its scientific naming, researchers debated whether the specimen belonged to Kritosaurus navajovius, a related species from the same layers of rocks, or a distinct animal. The genus contains a single species, Ahshislesaurus wimani, named in 2025. A partial skeleton and isolated limb and girdle bones found in the same rock layers may also belong to Ahshislesaurus.

As a member of the hadrosaurid tribe Kritosaurini, Ahshislesaurus did not have a decorative tube-like crest as in lambeosaurines like Parasaurolophus. Instead, it had a small bump over its snout. One of the most distinctive anatomical traits that distinguishes Ahshislesaurus from all other hadrosaurids is the height of its mandible at the front; in other species, the front part of the jaw gets thinner from top to bottom, while in Ahshislesaurus, the front is notably deeper.

Ahshislesaurus is known from the lower Kirtland Formation (Hunter Wash Member), which dates to the Campanian age (around 75 Ma) of the Cretaceous period. This formation has also yielded abundant fossils of diverse dinosaurs, including tyrannosauroids, ankylosaurids, pachycephalosaurs, and ceratopsians, in addition to pterosaurs, crocodylomorphs, turtles, and fish.

== History ==
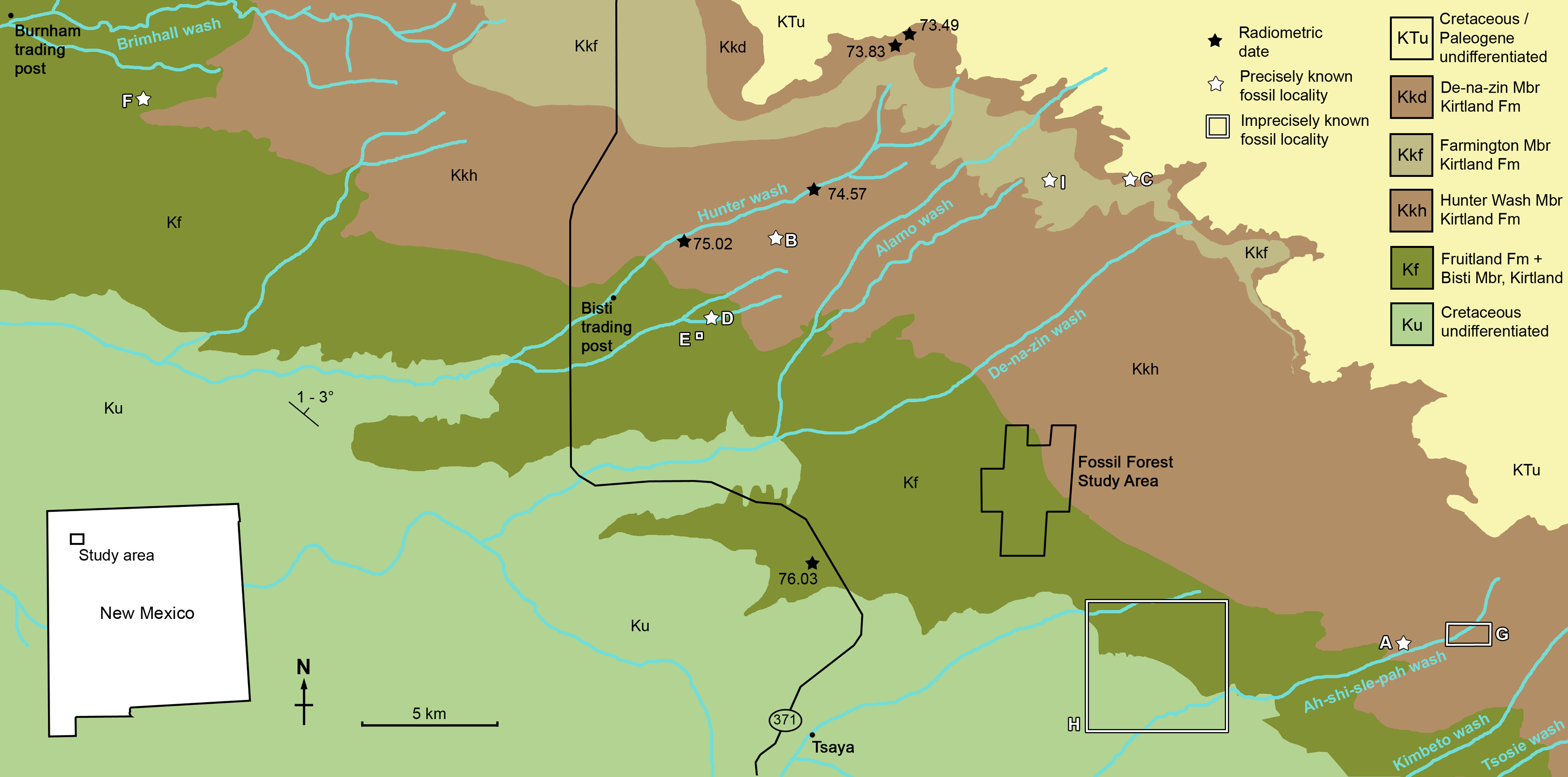
Map of the southeast San Juan Basin; Ahshislesaurus was found near Kimbetoh Wash (lower right) in the Hunter Wash Member of the Kirtland Formation (Kkh, medium brown)

=== Discovery ===
In 1935, American paleontologist Charles W. Gilmore published an article via the Smithsonian Institution, in which he reviewed and described many reptile fossils collected from outcrops of the Kirtland Formation in New Mexico, United States, dating to the end of the Cretaceous period. Among the specimens he mentioned were the posterior (back) part of a skull, the left lower jaw, and the second through fourth cervical (neck) vertebrae, accessioned as specimen USNM VP-8629 at the United States National Museum of Natural History (Smithsonian). This material was discovered in 1916 by Dr. J. B. Reeside Jr. near Kimbeto Wash (outcrops in the lower Hunter Wash Member) in San Juan County. While Gilmore did not provide a detailed description for this specimen, he noted putative close similarities between it and Kritosaurus navajovius, a hadrosaurid dinosaur named and described by Barnum Brown in 1910 based on a skull and mandible also collected in the Kirtland Formation. Gilmore further noted that this newer specimen is smaller than the type specimen of Kritosaurus, and while it shares the smooth-bordered teeth of this genus, it seemed to lack the papillae (denticles) on the teeth.

=== Subsequent discoveries and taxonomic debate ===
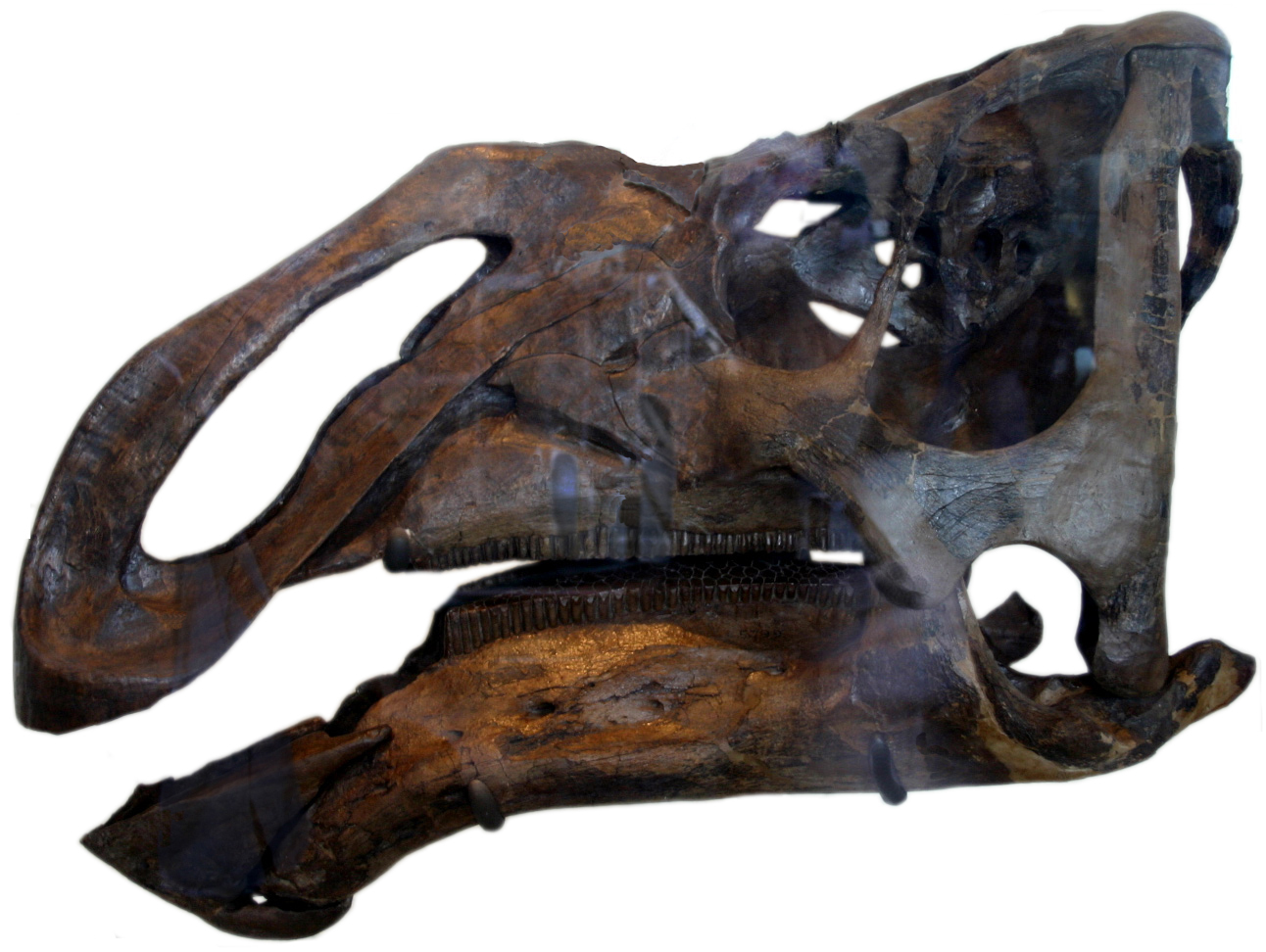
Holotype skull of Kritosaurus navajovius

Over the following years, several publications alluded to or discussed USNM VP-8629. In 1987, Spencer G. Lucas and colleagues mentioned it as referable to the genus Kritosaurus, as suggested by Gilmore in 1935, and used the specimen and several others found in other localities as evidence that the genus was well-established in the Fruitland and Kirtland formations. In a 2000 edited volume on the dinosaurs of New Mexico edited by Lucas and Andrew B. Heckert, Thomas E. Williamson provided the first published depiction, photographs in several anatomical views, of the specimen. In contrast to previous views, he further claimed that, since the specimen did not preserve the front part of the skull, including the distinctive nasal region of Kritosaurus, it likely lacked the anatomical characters necessary to place it in this genus. Williamson concluded USNM VP-8629 was best regarded as an indeterminate member of the Hadrosaurinae. In this chapter, he also figured and briefly described other hadrosaurid fossils from the San Juan Basin, including additional specimens identified as indeterminate hadrosaurines or hadrosaurids. Among these was NMMNH P-25057, a partial postcranial skeleton collected from Ah-shi-sle-pah Wash (NMMNH locality 3117) by K. Keith Rigby Jr. in the early 1980s, accessioned at the New Mexico Museum of Natural History and Science (NMMNH). This reasonably complete specimen was found in partial articulation, comprising the second through thirteenth cervical vertebrae, 13 poorly preserved dorsal (back) vertebrae, 14 ribs (five of which were found in articulation with their respective vertebrae), four sacral vertebrae, six caudal (tail) vertebrae, four anterior chevrons, a partial pelvic girdle (incomplete left ilium and pubis, and parts of both ischia), and much of the hindlimbs (left femur, tibia, and fibula, and metatarsals from both sides).

In an extensive redescription of Kritosaurus navajovius and the relationships of it and its relatives, Prieto-Márquez (2013) provided the first detailed description and analysis of USNM VP-8629. Herein, several anatomical traits were identified in this specimen that are shared with K. navajovius, leading Prieto-Márquez to regard it as a specimen of this species. Contrasting with Gilmore's original interpretation of the teeth, reduced denticles were observed, barely visible to the naked eye. The following year, Robert M. Sullivan and Spencer G. Lucas revisited the specimen, emphasizing its discovery in rock layers that are notably stratigraphically lower (older) than those in which the K. navajovius holotype was found in. They concluded that the evidence placing USNM VP-8629 in this species was unconvincing.

=== Naming ===
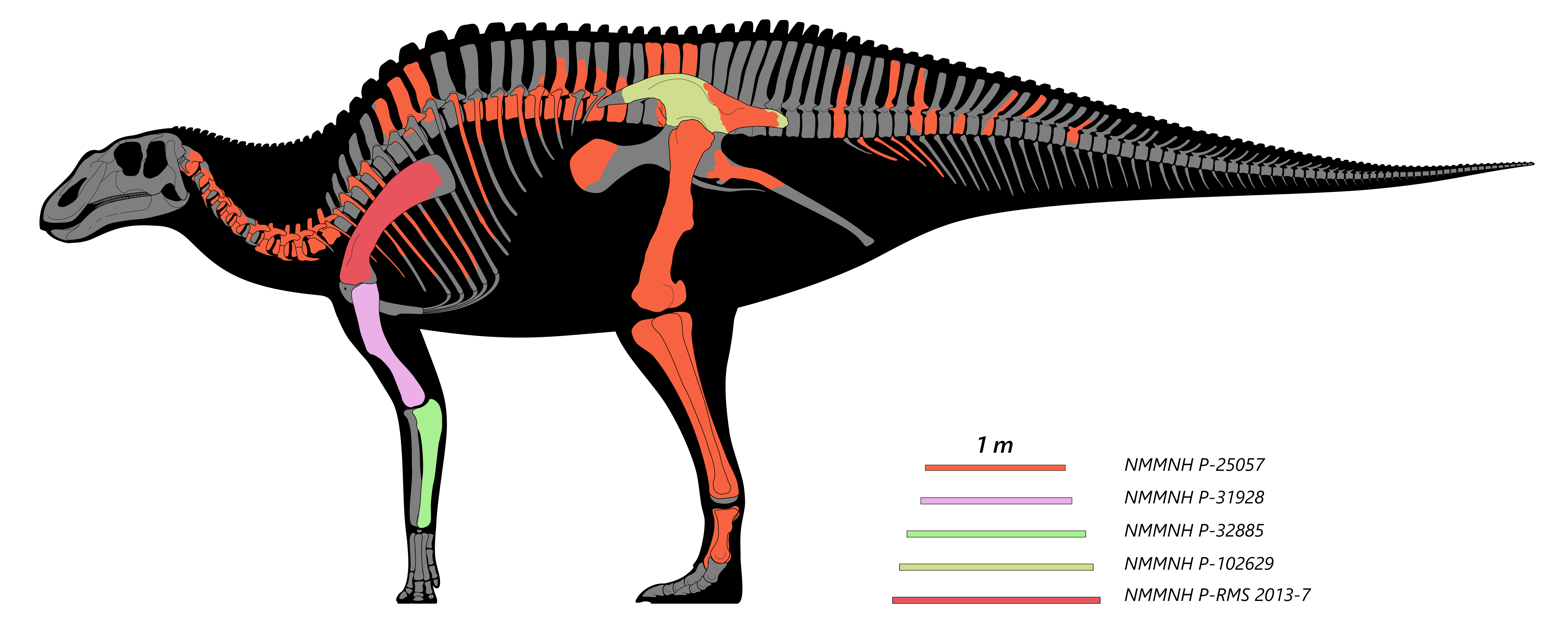
Reconstructed skeleton incorporating Hunter Wash material tentatively referred to Ahshislesaurus

In 2025, Sebastian G. Dalman and colleagues published a thorough revision of USNM VP-8629 and the hadrosaurid material found in the Hunter Wash Member of the Kirtland Formation. They determined that several anatomical characters could distinguish it from Kritosaurus, and that it was instead more closely related to Naashoibitosaurus, known from the younger De-na-zin Member of the Kirtland Formation. As such, they described Ahshislesaurus wimani as a new genus and species of saurolophine hadrosaurids based on these fossil remains, establishing USNM VP-8629 as the holotype specimen. NMMNH P-66929, an isolated left dentary from the Hunter Wash Member similar to the holotype, was formally referred to Ahshislesaurus. Based on similarities observed between the cervical vertebrae of the holotype and those of the more complete skeleton NMMNH P-25057, as well as the discovery of both in the lower Hunter Wash Member, the researchers suggested the latter may also belong to Ahshislesaurus. Some isolated bones from the Hunter Wash Member could potentially belong to this genus, but do not overlap with the previous specimens and so can not be referred to Ahshislesaurus since multiple distinct saurolophines could have coexisted at that time. These include NMMNH P-RMS 2013-7 (a left scapula), NMMNH P-31928 (an adult left humerus), NMMNH P-37624 (a small juvenile left humerus), NMMNH P-32885 (a right ulna), and NMMNH P-102629 (a nearly complete left ilium).

The generic name, Ahshislesaurus, references the Ah-shi-sle-pah Wilderness, in which the outcrops of the lower Hunter Wash Member of the Kirtland Formation (New Mexico) that yielded the holotype and referred specimens are located. "Ah-shi-sle-pah" is a phonetic transliteration of the Navajo áshįįh łibá, which means "salt, it is gray". This is combined with the Ancient Greek σαῦρος (sauros), meaning "lizard". The specific name, wimani, honors Swedish paleontologist Carl Wiman, who researched vertebrate fossils from New Mexico's San Juan Basin.

== Description ==
Size of two specimens compared to a human

Ahshislesaurus is a hadrosaurid, or 'duckbilled' dinosaur, and would have been a herbivorous animal with a broad, toothless 'beak'. The teeth on the sides of the mouth were very complex, arranged into tightly packed, interlocking dental 'batteries' allowing for constant replacement of teeth. There are 45 preserved tooth positions in Ahshislesaurus, compared to 42 in Kritosaurus. Each tooth has a prominent straight vertical ridge running along the full height of the tooth. Ahshislesaurus has been estimated at up to 11 metres (36 ft), making it a large member of this group.

While the holotype specimen of Ahshislesaurus is incomplete, several observations can be made. The entire rear portion of the skull is preserved, indicating it has the skull shape typical of kritosaurin hadrosaurids, lacking the unique nasal structures and ornamentation seen in lambeosaurines like Parasaurolophus and Corythosaurus. Instead, Ahshislesaurus would almost certainly have had a low narial crest on the snout in front of the eyes like other kritosaurins. Compared to other kritosaurins, Ahshislesaurus and its closest relatives had skulls that were less deep, with uniquely robust dentaries (lower jaw bone). The dentary of Ahshislesaurus in particular is very deep at the anterior (front) end, in contrast to most hadrosaurids, where it is more narrow at the front. Other autapomorphies (unique derived characters) were proposed in the skull of Ahshislesaurus, distinguishing it from all other hadrosaurids. For the quadrate, it is robust and wide throughout its length when viewed from the side, and the dorsal (top) end is inclined somewhat posteriorly, compared to most hadrosaurids, where it is straight. The quadratojugal flange (articular region for this bone) of the jugal is long, with a generally uniform width, and the posterior process of this bone is convex and broad, rather than tapering.

The axis (second neck vertebra) of the Ahshislesaurus holotype has a sub-triangular neural spine (process at the top of the vertebra), where the dorsal margin is rounded and fan-like. The neural spines of the two following articulated vertebrae are substantially reduced. As is typical of hadrosaurids, the cervical vertebral centra (cylindrical part forming the base of the vertebra) are longer than they are tall. The third and fourth cervical vertebrae have opisthocoelous (convex anteriorly and concave posteriorly) centra. The prezygapophyses of these vertebrae are situated vertically and have a circular outline when viewed from the side. The postzygapophyses are oriented slightly posterolaterally (backward and to the sides), with a short and robust morphology. When viewed from the side, they are elevated greatly above the back of the centrum. The parapophyses are prominent on the lateral sides of the vertebrae, positioned immediately above the dorsal centrum margin.

== Classification ==
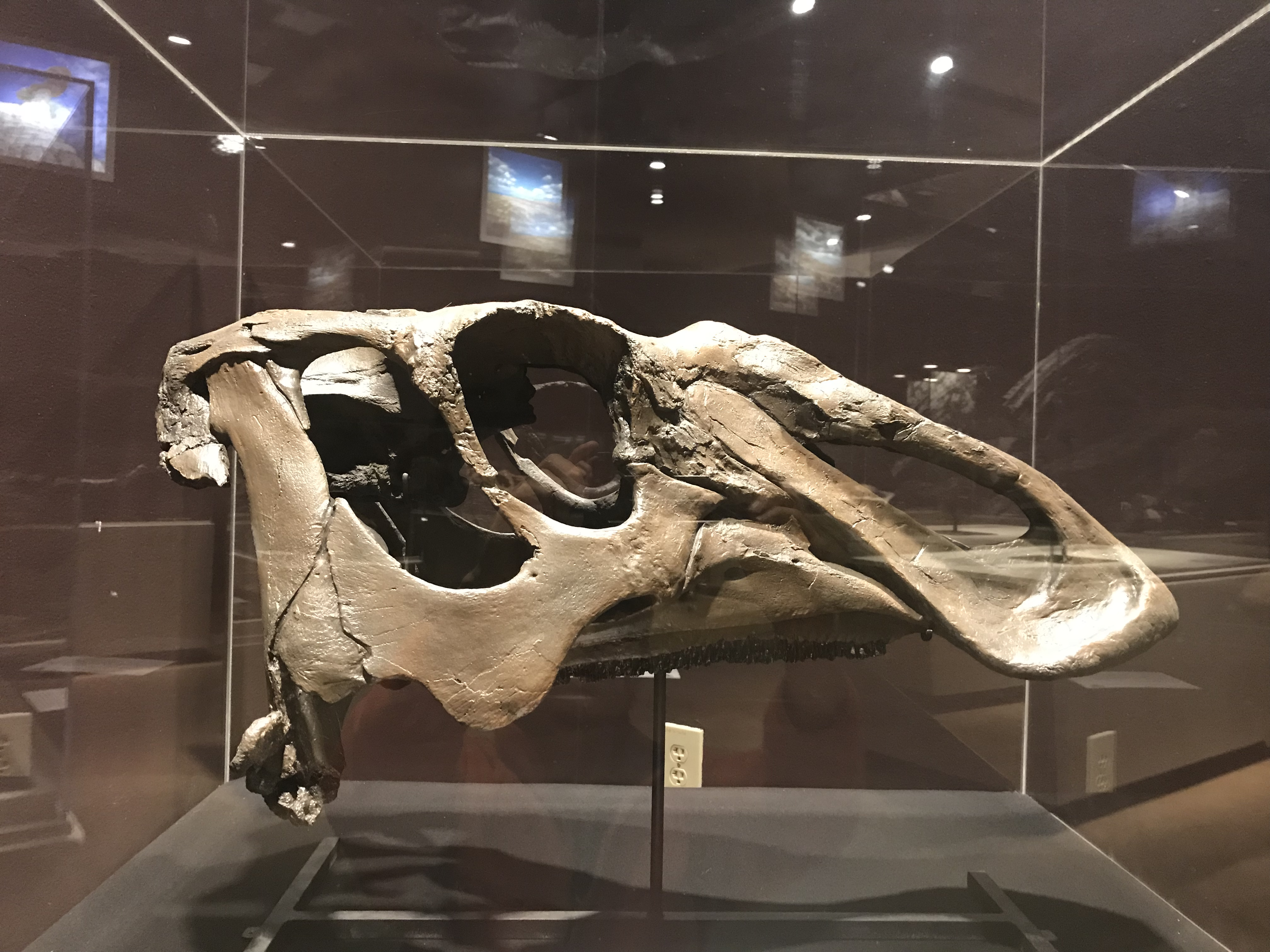
Skull of the closely related Naashoibitosaurus

To determine the affinities and relationships of Ahshislesaurus following their reinterpretation of the fossil material as distinct from Kritosaurus, Dalman and colleagues (2025) scored it in the phylogenetic matrix of Prieto-Márquez and Wagner (2023), which samples 89 separate taxonomic units (OTUs) within the Ornithopoda. While the referral of the Hunter Wash Member postcranial remains to Ahshislesaurus is tentative, the researchers scored this material as well, since postcranial remains carry a lower phylogenetic signal in regard to the evolutionary relationships of hadrosaurids, and since restricting the scored characters to those of the holotype skull did not change the taxon's placement. After excluding the fragmentary or poorly-known genera Claosaurus, Malefica, Penelopognathus, Tanius, and Yamatosaurus due to their inclusion reducing the resolution of the analyses, a maximum parsimony tree was obtained, resolving Ahshislesaurus as a member of the Hadrosauridae. They recovered it within the more exclusive Saurolophinae, which includes hadrosaurids more closely related to Saurolophus than to Lambeosaurus (relatives of the latter being placed within the Lambeosaurinae). Within saurolophines, this version of the analysis placed Ahshislesaurus in an early-diverging position within the Kritosaurini, as the sister taxon to Naashoibitosaurus in a clade also including "Gryposaurus" alsatei and PASAC-1, an unnamed specimen from the Olmos Formation of Mexico informally known as "Sabinosaurus".

To further test the relationships of Ahshislesaurus, Dalman and colleagues also performed a Bayesian analysis using BEAST (Bayesian Evolutionary Analysis Sampling Trees), which is more commonly used for gene-based datasets for extant taxa. This analysis recovered better-resolved and generally similar results to those of the maximum parsimony tree, with Ahshislesaurus, Naashoibitosaurus, and PASAC-1 forming a clade, although "Gryposaurus" alsatei was recovered in a slightly more crownward position, in a clade with UTEP P.37.7, an unnamed specimen from Big Bend National Park. Both analyses provided strong support for a position of Ahshislesaurus far removed from Kritosaurus, illustrating the high diversity of saurolophines during the Cretaceous in Laramidia. The results of the Bayesian analysis of Dalman and colleagues (2025) are shown in the cladogram below, with node names following Madzia et al. (2021). ⊞ buttons can be clicked to expand nodes.

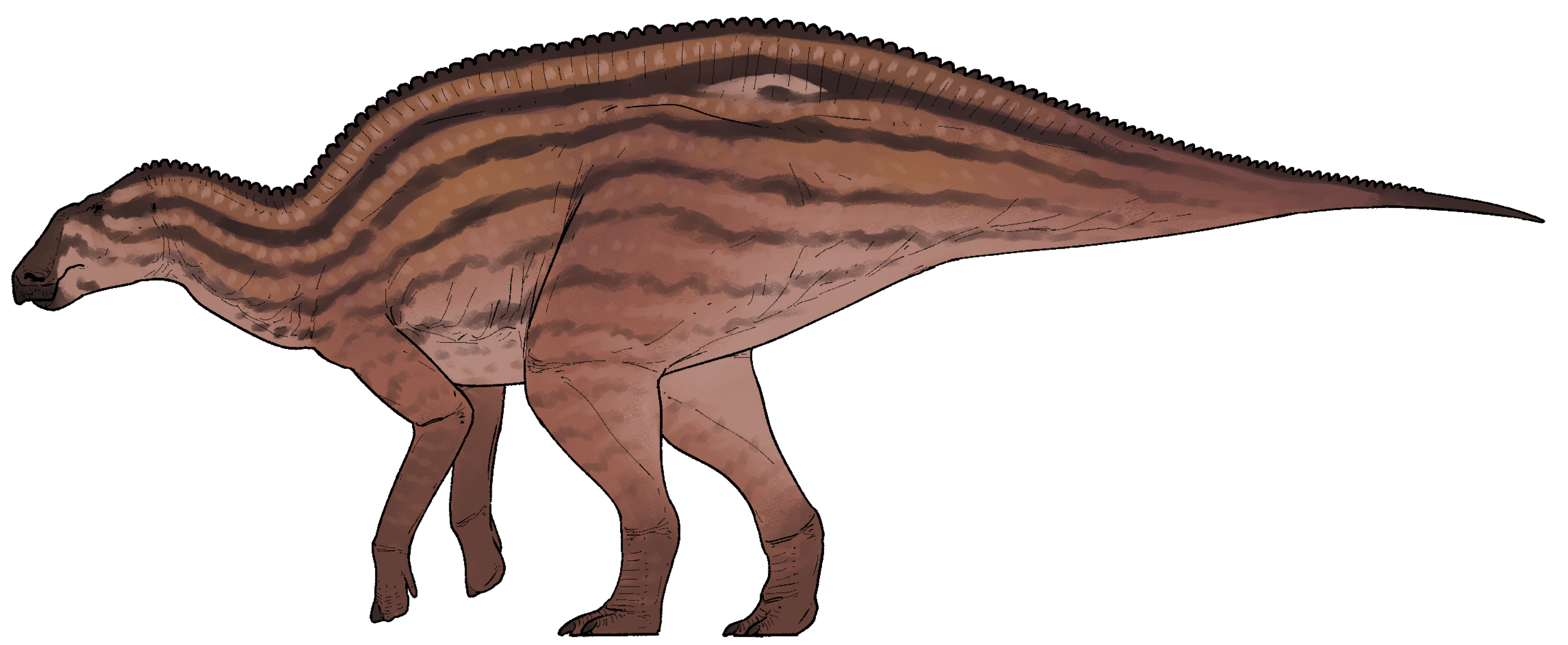
Speculative life restoration of Ahshislesaurus

- Hadrosauridae
  - - Aquilarhinus palimentus
    - - Hadrosaurus foulkii
      - Jaxartosaurus aralensis
  - Euhadrosauria
    - Lambeosaurinae
      ⊞
      - Aralosaurus tuberiferus
      - - Tsintaosaurini
        - Corythosauria
          - Parasaurolophini
          - Lambeosaurini
      ⊟
    - Saurolophinae
      - Brachylophosaurini
        ⊞
        - Wulagasaurus dongi
        - - - Acristavus gagslarsoni
            - Maiasaura peeblesorum
          - - Brachylophosaurus canadensis
            - - Ornatops incantatus
              - Probrachylophosaurus bergei
        ⊟
      - - Edmontosaurini
          ⊞
          - Kerberosaurus manakini
          - - Laiyangosaurus youngi
            - - Shantungosaurus giganteus
              - - Kundurosaurus nagornyi
                - - Edmontosaurus annectens
                  - Edmontosaurus regalis
          ⊟
        - - Saurolophini
            ⊞
            - Kamuysaurus japonicus
            - - Prosaurolophus maximus
              - - Augustynolophus morrisi
                - - Saurolophus angustirostris
                  - Saurolophus osborni
            ⊟
          - Kritosaurini
            - - PASAC-1 ("Sabinosaurus")
              - - Ahshislesaurus wimani
                - Naashoibitosaurus ostromi
            - - - - - - Anasazisaurus horneri
                      - Kritosaurus navajovius
                    - - Bonapartesaurus rionegrensis
                  - - - Huallasaurus australis
                      - Secernosaurus koerneri
                - - Kelumapusaura machi
                  - - - - Rhinorex condrupus
                      - - Gryposaurus latidens
                        - Gryposaurus notabilis
                    - - Gryposaurus monumentensis
              - - "Gryposaurus" alsatei
                - UTEP P.37.7 (Big Bend hadrosaurid)

== Paleoenvironment ==
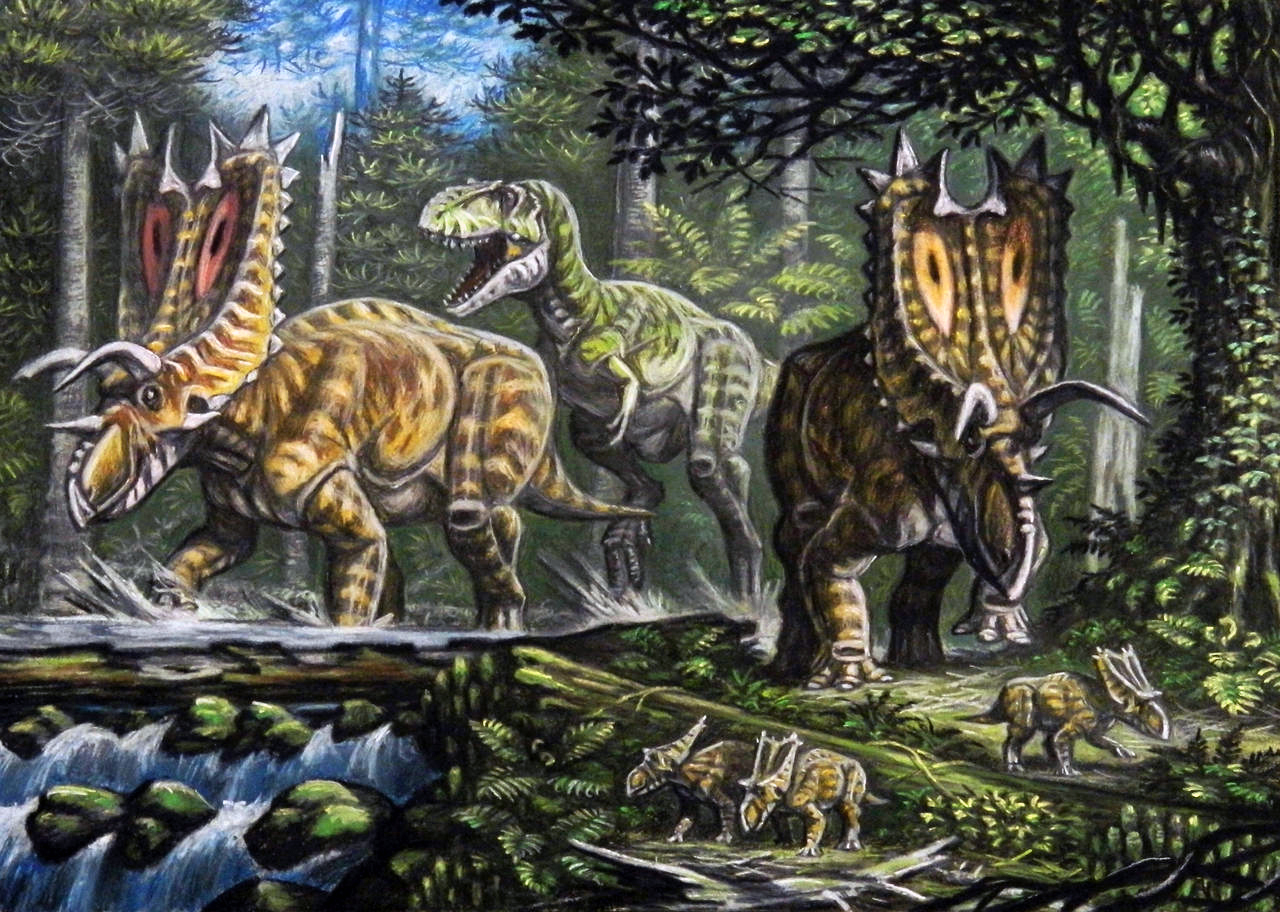
Reconstruction of Bistahieversor hunting Pentaceratops in a Kirtland Formation environment

Ahshislesaurus is known from the Hunter Wash Member of the Kirtland Formation, which dates to the Campanian age of the Late Cretaceous. This is the stratigraphically lowest (oldest) unit of the formation, followed by Farmington and then De-na-zin members. Saurolophine hadrosaurids are fairly common in the formation, with Anasazisaurus, Kritosaurus, and Naashoibitosaurus having been named from the De-na-Zin Member. Other dinosaurs named from the Hunter Wash Member include the ankylosaurids Ahshislepelta and Ziapelta, the pachycephalosaur Stegoceras, the ceratopsians Terminocavus and Navajoceratops, and the tyrannosauroid theropod Bistahieversor. The pterosaur Navajodactylus has also been named from the region.

== See also ==
- Timeline of hadrosaur research
- 2025 in archosaur paleontology
