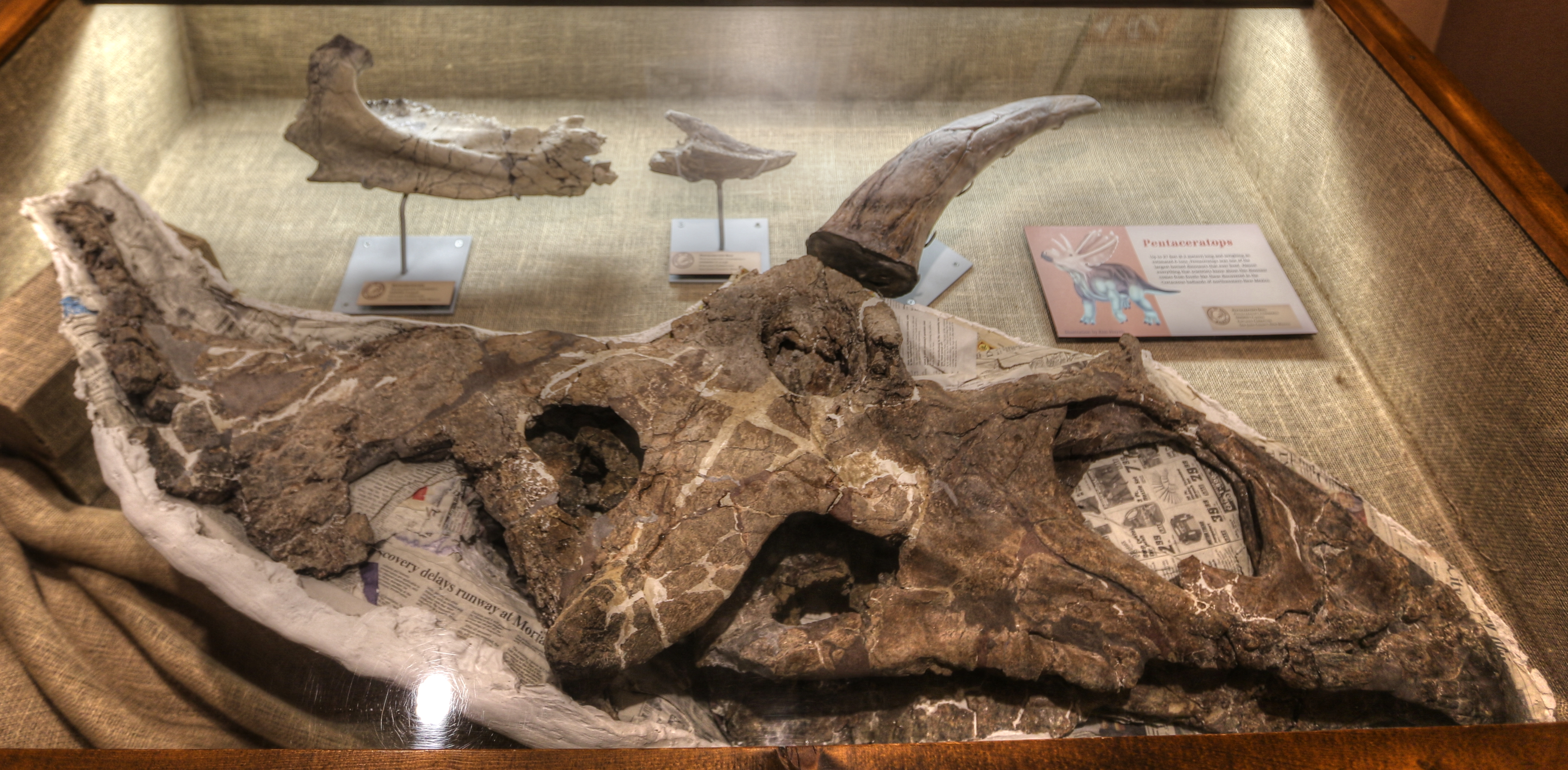
- Holotype skull in the New Mexico Museum of Natural History and Science

Scientific classification
- Kingdom: Animalia
- Phylum: Chordata
- Class: Reptilia
- Clade: Dinosauria
- Clade: †Ornithischia
- Clade: †Ceratopsia
- Family: †Ceratopsidae
- Subfamily: †Chasmosaurinae
- Genus: †Bisticeratops; Dalman et al., 2022
- Species: †B. froeseorum

Binomial name
- †Bisticeratops froeseorum Dalman et al., 2022

= Bisticeratops =

Bisticeratops Temporal range: Late Cretaceous, late Campanian, 74 Ma

Extinct genus of chasmosaurine dinosaurs

Bisticeratops (meaning "Bisti/De-Na-Zin Wilderness horned face") is a genus of chasmosaurine ceratopsian from outcrops of the Campanian age Kirtland Formation found in the Bisti/De-Na-Zin Wilderness in northwestern New Mexico, United States. The type and only species is B. froeseorum, known from a nearly complete skull.

== Discovery and naming ==
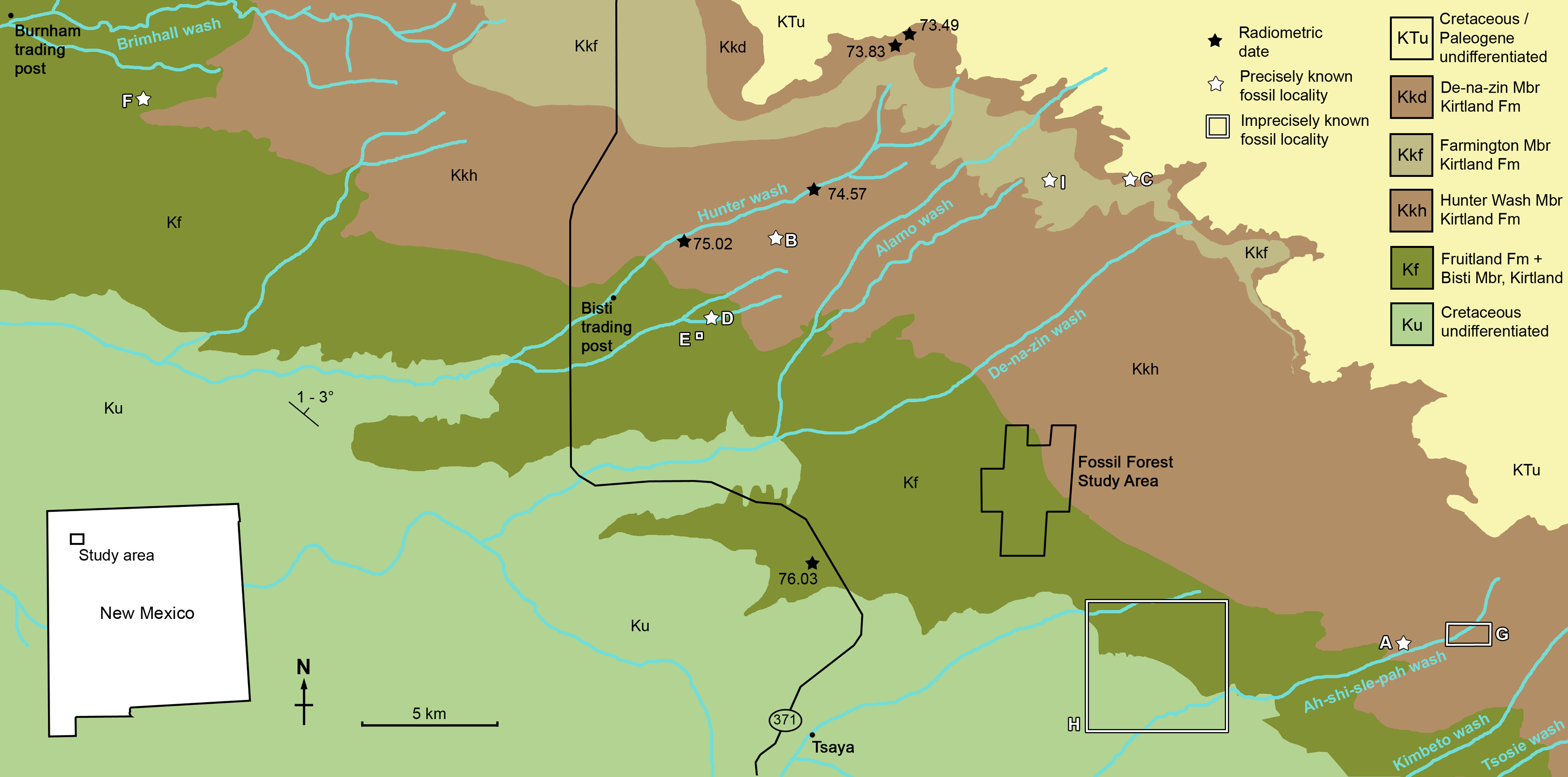
Map of the southeast San Juan Basin; I (upper right) is the collection area of Bisticeratops

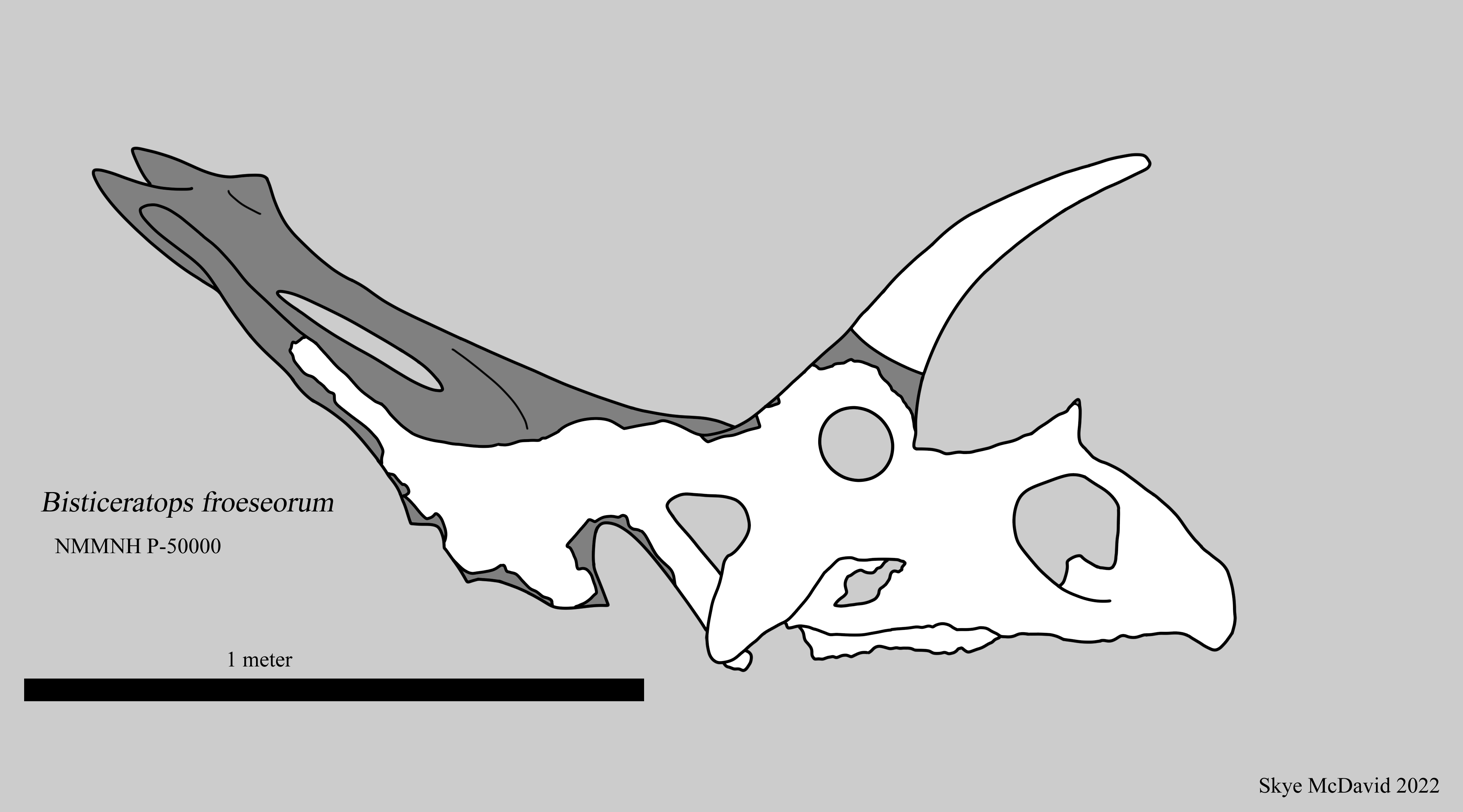
Diagram showing preserved parts of the holotype skull

The Bisticeratops holotype specimen, NMMNH P-50000, was discovered in 1975 in layers of the Kirtland Formation (Farmington Member) in the Bisti/De-Na-Zin Wilderness area of San Juan Basin, northwestern New Mexico, United States, which dates to the late Campanian age of the late Cretaceous period. The specimen consists of a mostly complete skull, missing the parietal, left squamosal, postorbital horncores (only the cast of the right postorbital horncore is preserved), left jugal, left quadrate, predentary, and both dentaries.

The holotype specimen was originally thought to be a specimen of Pentaceratops, despite being two million years younger than other specimens of that genus. When the description of Sierraceratops was initially published online in 2021, the name "Bisticeratops froeseorum" was leaked in a cladogram, but edited out when physically published in early 2022. Bisticeratops froeseorum was formally described by Dalman et al. in a separate paper published the same year.

The generic name, "Bisticeratops", combines "Bisti", a reference to the location where the holotype was discovered, with the Greek keras (meaning "horn"), and ops (meaning "face"). The specific name honors Edgar Froese, the founder of the band Tangerine Dream, and his son Jerome, former member of Tangerine Dream and founder of the band Loom. Their music is said to have "provided through the years" and inspired the description.

== Classification ==
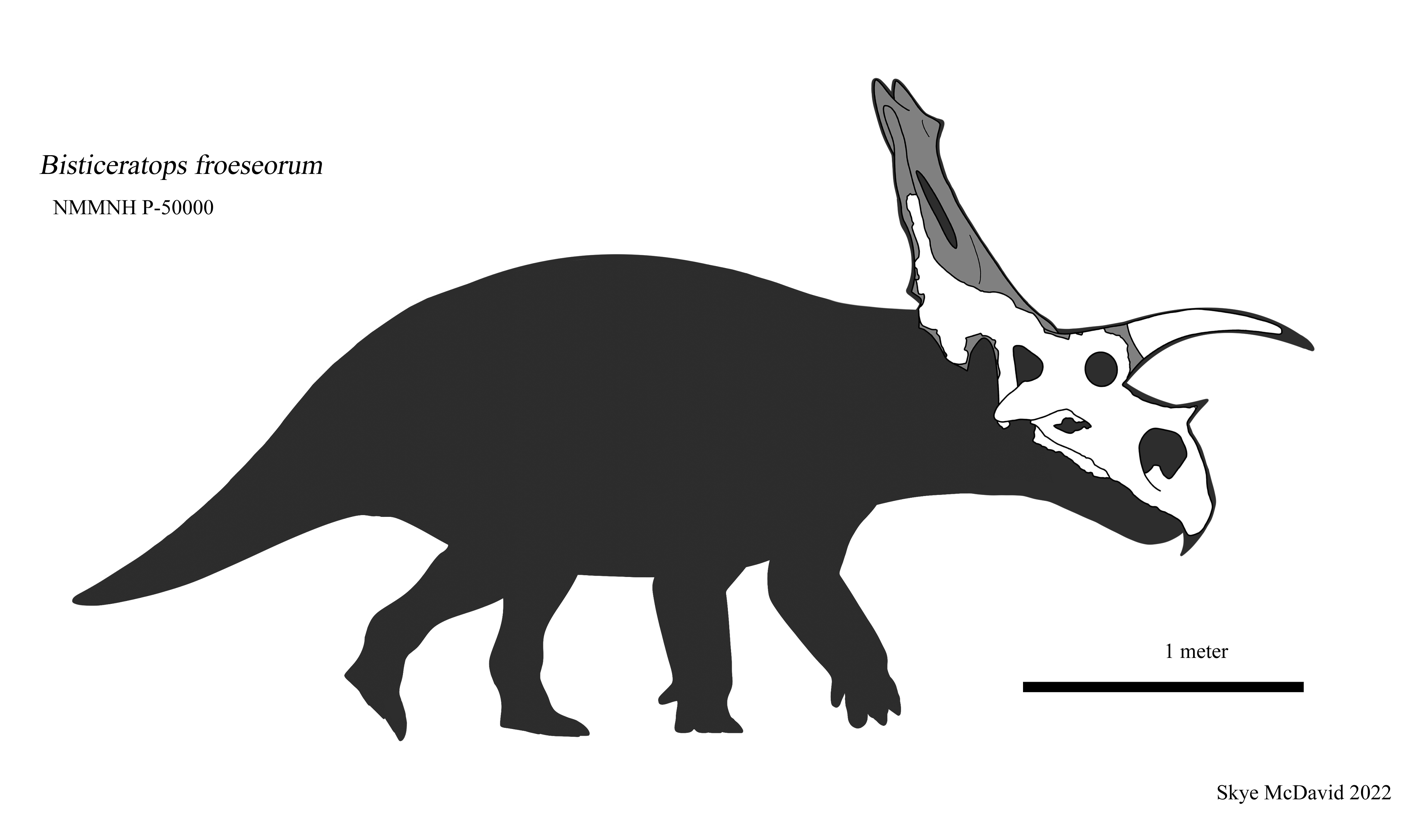
Skeletal diagram

Using the same phylogenetic analyses used to find the position of Sierraceratops, Dalman et al. (2022) recovered Bisticeratops as a sister taxon to an unnamed ceratopsian from the Almond Formation. The cladogram below displays the results of the phylogenetic analyses by Dalman, Jasinski, & Lucas.

- Ceratopsidae
  - Centrosaurinae
  - Chasmosaurinae
    - Mercuriceratops
    - - Judiceratops
      - - - Chasmosaurus spp.
          - - Agujaceratops mariscalensis
            - Mojoceratops
        - - Agujaceratops? mavericus
          - - - Pentaceratops aquilonius
              - Williams Fork chasmosaurine
              - - Pentaceratops sternbergii
                - Utahceratops
                - Navajoceratops
                - Terminocavus
            - - - Spiclypeus
                - Kosmoceratops
              - - - Bisticeratops
                  - Almond Formation chasmosaurine
                - - Anchiceratops
                  - - - Arrhinoceratops
                      - Triceratopsini
                    - - Sierraceratops
                      - Bravoceratops
                      - Coahuilaceratops

== Paleobiology ==
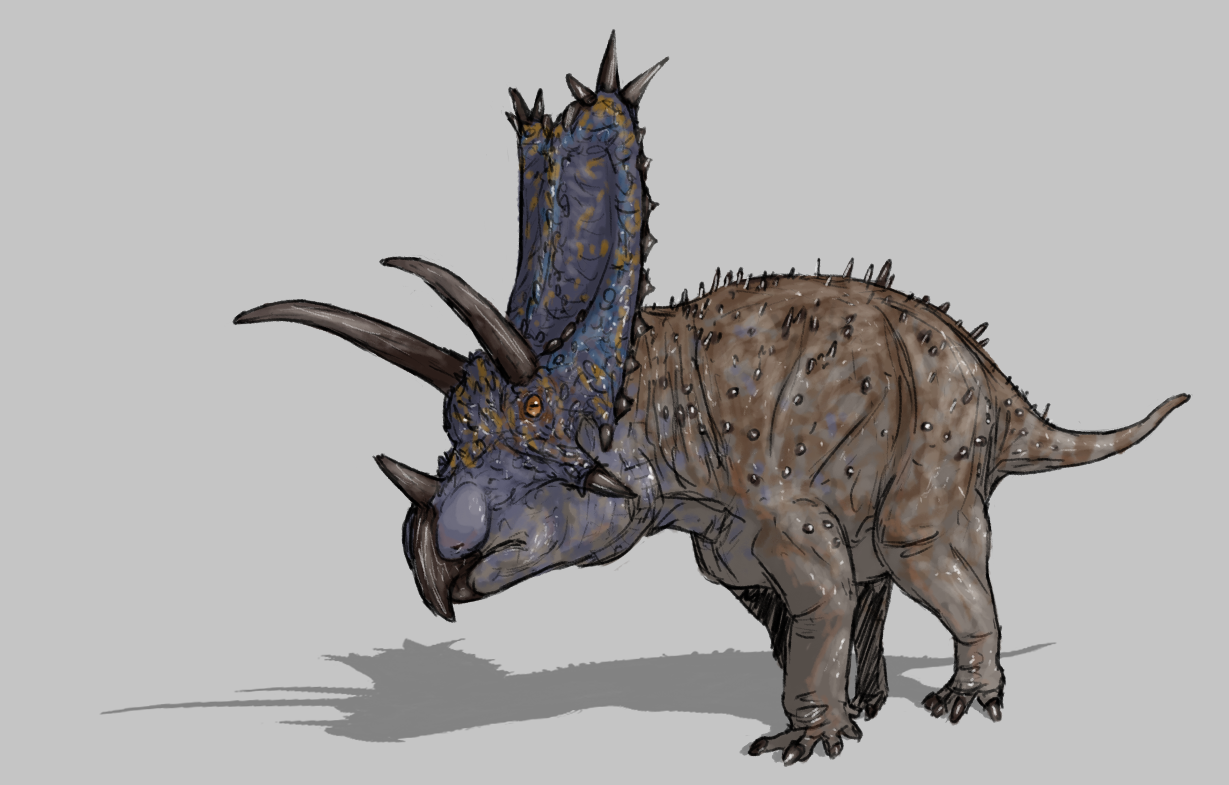
Life reconstruction

The holotype preserves bite marks from tyrannosaurids, some of which show signs of healing.

== Paleoenvironment ==
The fossil remains of Bisticeratops were recovered from the Farmington Member of the Kirtland Formation. This area represents the product of alluvial muds and overbank sand deposits from the many channels draining the coastal plain that existed on the inland seashore of North America during the late Cretaceous period. No other dinosaurs have been described from the Farmington Member, but taxa from other sub-units include kritosaurin and lambeosaurine hadrosaurs, ankylosaurids, chasmosaurine ceratopsids, pachycephalosaurids, dromaeosaurids, an indeterminate ornithomimid, tyrannosauroids, azhdarchids, crurotarsans, turtles, and cartilaginous and bony fish from the De-Na-Zin and Hunter Wash members.
