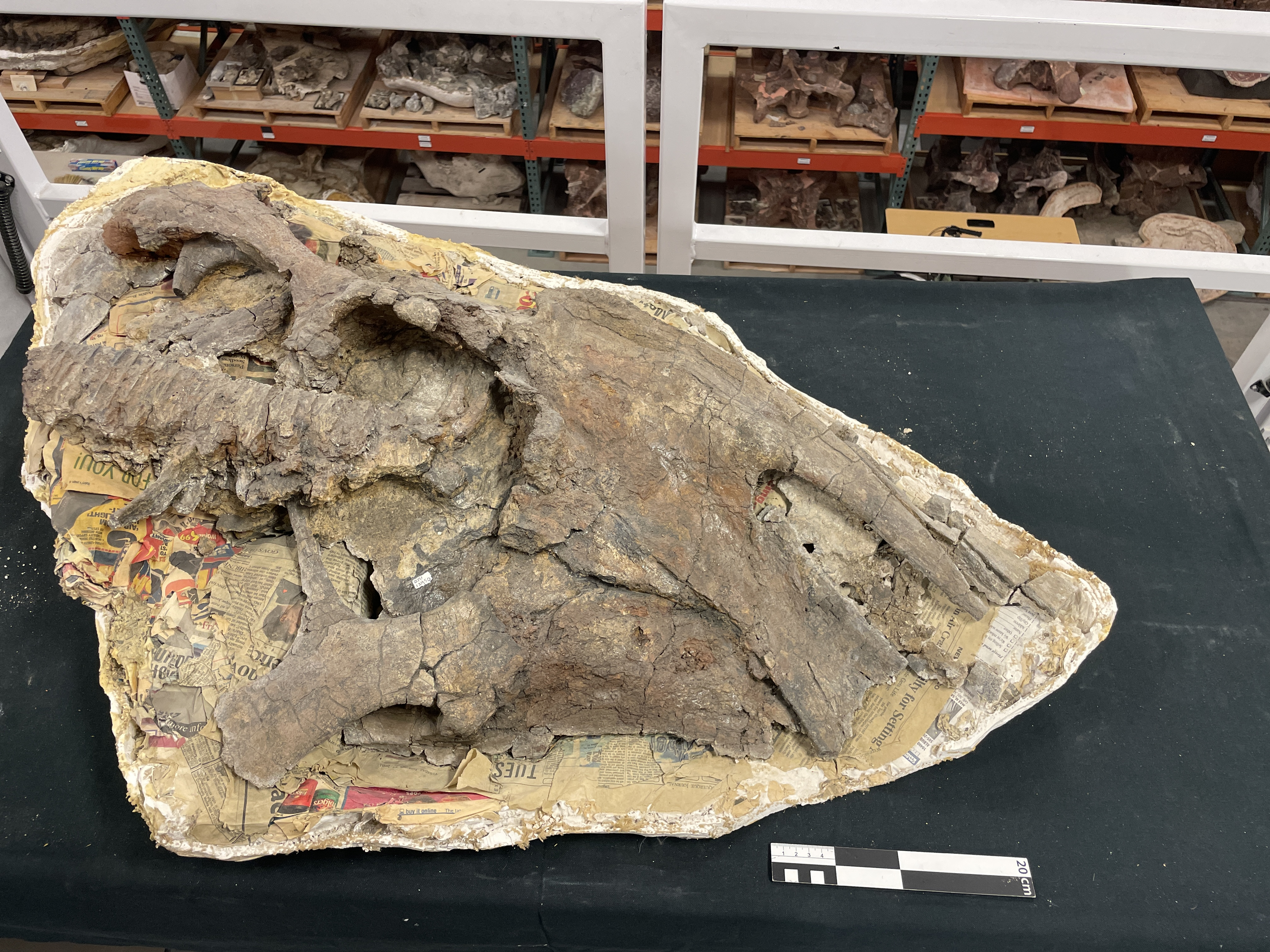
- Holotype skull

Scientific classification
- Kingdom: Animalia
- Phylum: Chordata
- Class: Reptilia
- Clade: Dinosauria
- Clade: †Ornithischia
- Clade: †Ornithopoda
- Family: †Hadrosauridae
- Subfamily: †Saurolophinae
- Tribe: †Kritosaurini
- Genus: †Anasazisaurus; Hunt & Lucas, 1993

Type species
- †Anasazisaurus horneri Hunt & Lucas, 1993

= Anasazisaurus =

Anasazisaurus Temporal range: Late Cretaceous, 74 Ma

Extinct genus of dinosaurs

Anasazisaurus (/ˌɑːnəˌsɑːziˈsɔːrəs/ AH-nə-SAH-zee-SOR-əs; "Anasazi lizard") is a genus of saurolophine hadrosaurid ("duckbill") ornithopod dinosaur that lived about 74 million years ago, in the Late Cretaceous Period. It was found in the Farmington Member of the Kirtland Formation, in the San Juan Basin of New Mexico, United States. Only a partial skull has been found to date. It was first described as a specimen of Kritosaurus by Jack Horner, and has been intertwined with Kritosaurus since its description. It is known for its short nasal crest, which stuck out above and between its eyes for a short distance.

== Discovery and naming ==
Adrian Hunt and Spencer G. Lucas, American paleontologists, named this dinosaur in 1993. Its name is derived from the Anasazi, an outdated term for the Ancestral Pueblo Native American people, and the Greek word sauros ("lizard"). The Ancestral Puebloans were famous for their cliff-dwellings, such as those in Chaco Canyon, near the location of fossil Anasazisaurus remains. The term "Anasazi" itself is actually a Navajo language word, anaasází ("enemy ancestors"). There is one known species (A. horneri), which is named in honor of Jack Horner, an influential paleontologist who first described the skull in 1992. The holotype skull (and only known specimen) was collected in the late 1970s by a Brigham Young University field party working in San Juan County, and is housed at BYU as BYU 12950.

Horner originally assigned the skull to Kritosaurus navajovius. Later, Hunt and Lucas claimed that the Kritosaurus holotype was undiagnostic and judged the genus to be a nomen dubium. They decided to give BYU 12950 the new name Anasazisaurus horneri. Some later authors, including those of the most recent review, followed this decision. However, others disagreed, including Thomas Williamson, who made the most detailed published case. In a paper published in 2014, Alberto Prieto-Marquez agreed that Anasazisaurus horneri is similar to Kritosaurus navajovius, but found it distinct enough to be considered a valid species of Kritosaurus, as K. horneri. While this conclusion has been accepted in later papers, one study finds it to be a member of the Saurolophini, although it did not include Kritosaurus navajovius.

== Description ==
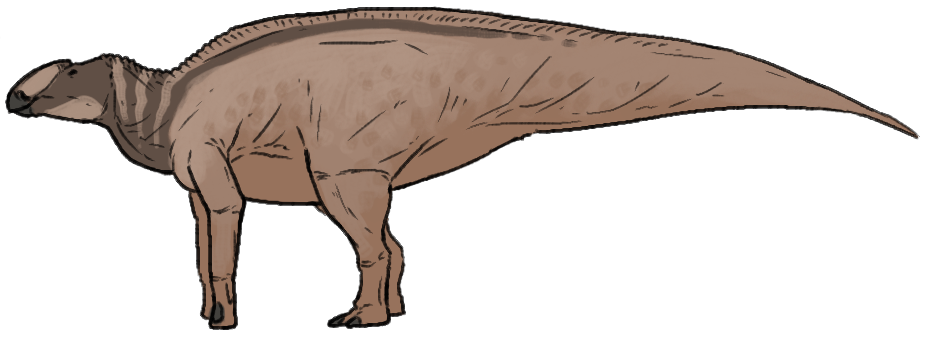
Life restoration

The anatomy of Anasazisaurus is poorly known. The skull is somewhat poorly preserved, lacks the lower jaw, beak, and quadrate, and was only recently fully prepared. It has a sort of tab or flange of bone, from the nasals, that rises between and above the eyes and folds back under itself. This unique crest allows it to be distinguished from similar hadrosaurs, like Gryposaurus. The top of the crest is roughened, and the maximum preserved length of the skull is ~90 centimeters (~35 in). According to Gregory S. Paul, it was about 7.5 meters long and weigh up to 2500 kg.

== Classification ==
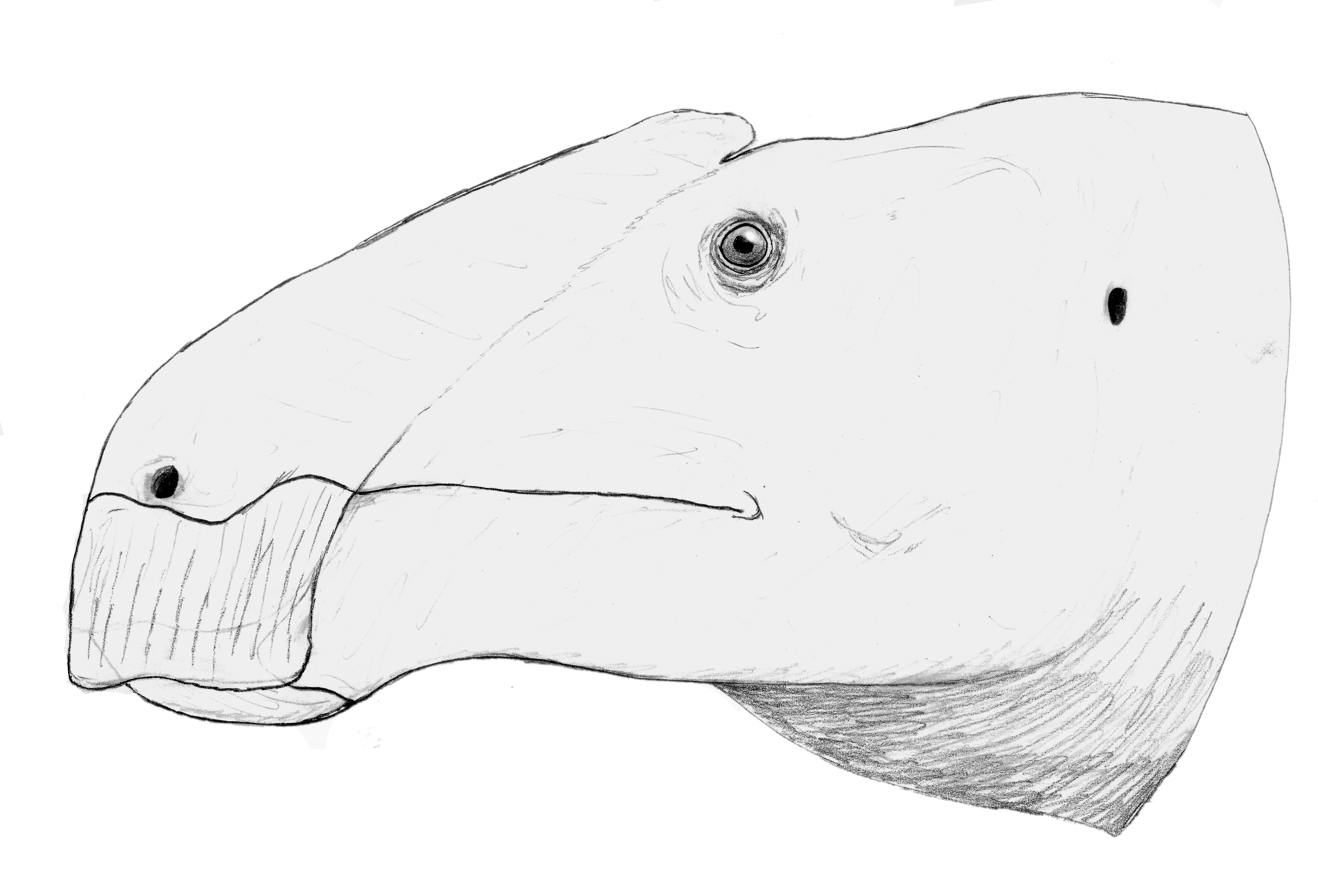
Restoration of the head

Anasazisaurus is a saurolophine hadrosaurid, meaning it lacked a hollow crest. The most recent review recognized it as distinct, but did not try to place it beyond Hadrosaurinae.

== Paleobiology ==
As a hadrosaurid, Anasazisaurus would have been a large bipedal/quadrupedal herbivore, eating plants with a sophisticated skull that permitted a grinding motion analogous to chewing. Its teeth were continually replacing and packed into dental batteries that contained hundreds of teeth, only a relative handful of which were in use at any time. Plant material would have been cropped by its beak, and held in the jaws by a muscular cheek. Feeding would have been from the ground up to ~4 meters (13 ft) above.

== Paleoenvironment ==
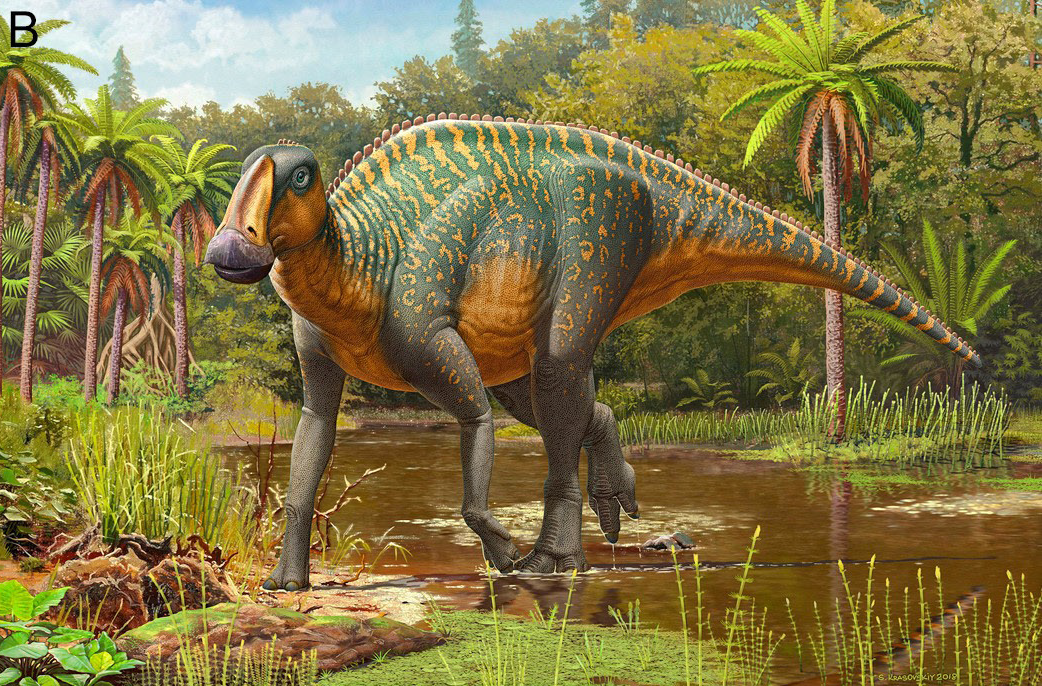
Anasazisaurus in environment

Anasazisaurus was discovered in the Farmington Member of the Kirtland Formation, which is one of the lower members. This formation dates from the late Campanian stages of the Late Cretaceous Period (73-74 million years ago), and is also the source of several other dinosaurs, like Bistahieversor, Kritosaurus, Naashoibitosaurus, Parasaurolophus, Pentaceratops, Nodocephalosaurus, Saurornitholestes, and Ziapelta.

== See also ==
- Timeline of hadrosaur research
