= Kirtland Formation =

Geological formation in New Mexico and Colorado, United States

- Stratigraphic range: Campanian (typically Kirtlandian); 75–73.5 Ma
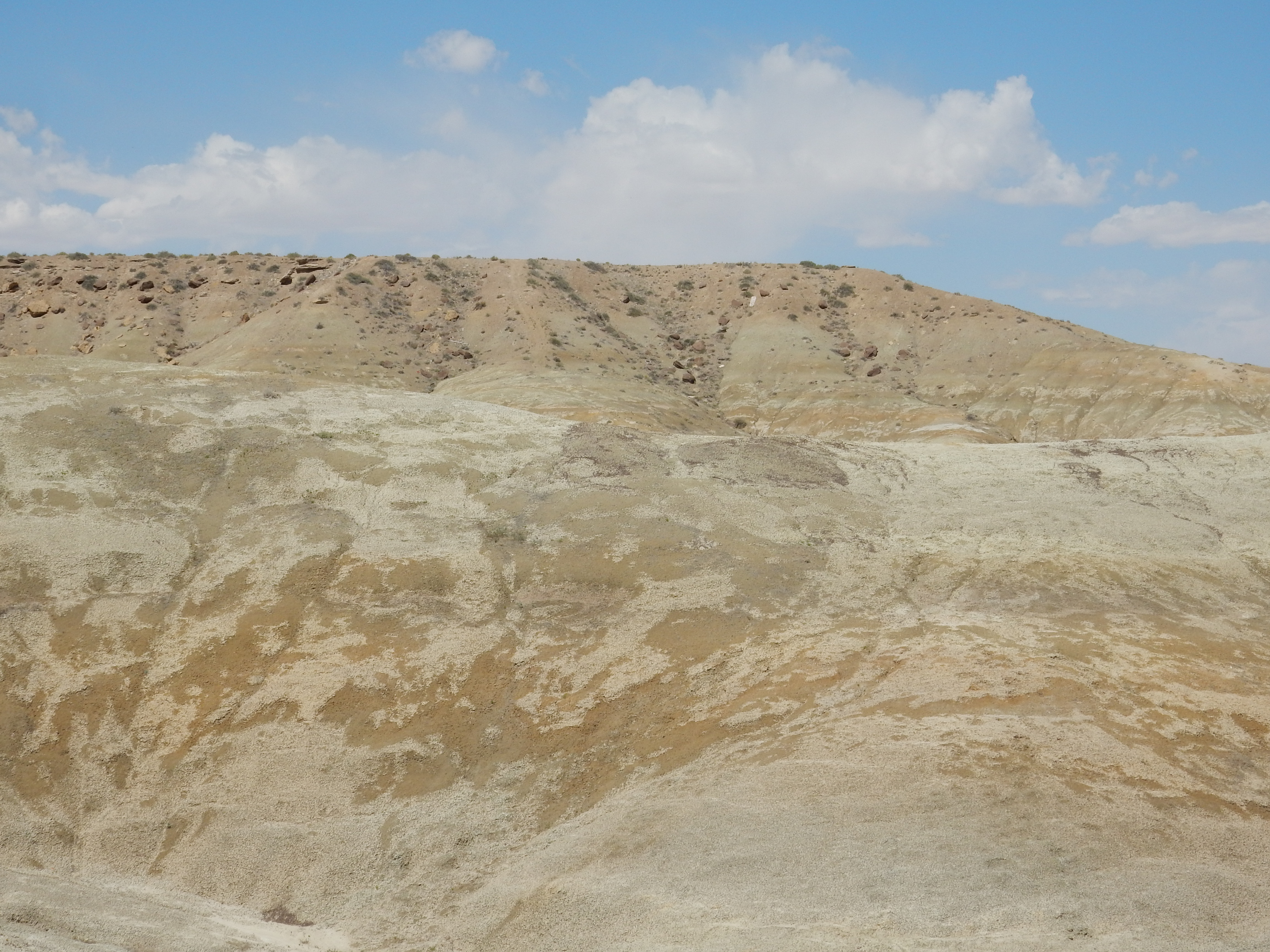
- Kirtland Formation at its type location south of Kirtland, New Mexico
- Type: Geological formation
- Sub-units: Hunter Wash, Farmington and De-na-zin Members
- Underlies: Ojo Alamo Formation
- Overlies: Fruitland Formation
- Thickness: 594 m (1,949 ft)

Lithology
- Primary: Sandstone
- Other: Shale, mudstone, conglomerate

Location
- Coordinates: 36.708°N 108.350°W
- Approximate paleocoordinates: 42.6°N 76.3°W
- Region: New Mexico
- Country: United States
- Extent: San Juan Basin

Type section
- Named for: Kirtland Post Office
- Named by: C.M. Bauer
- Year defined: 1916
- Kirtland Formation (the United States) Kirtland Formation (New Mexico)

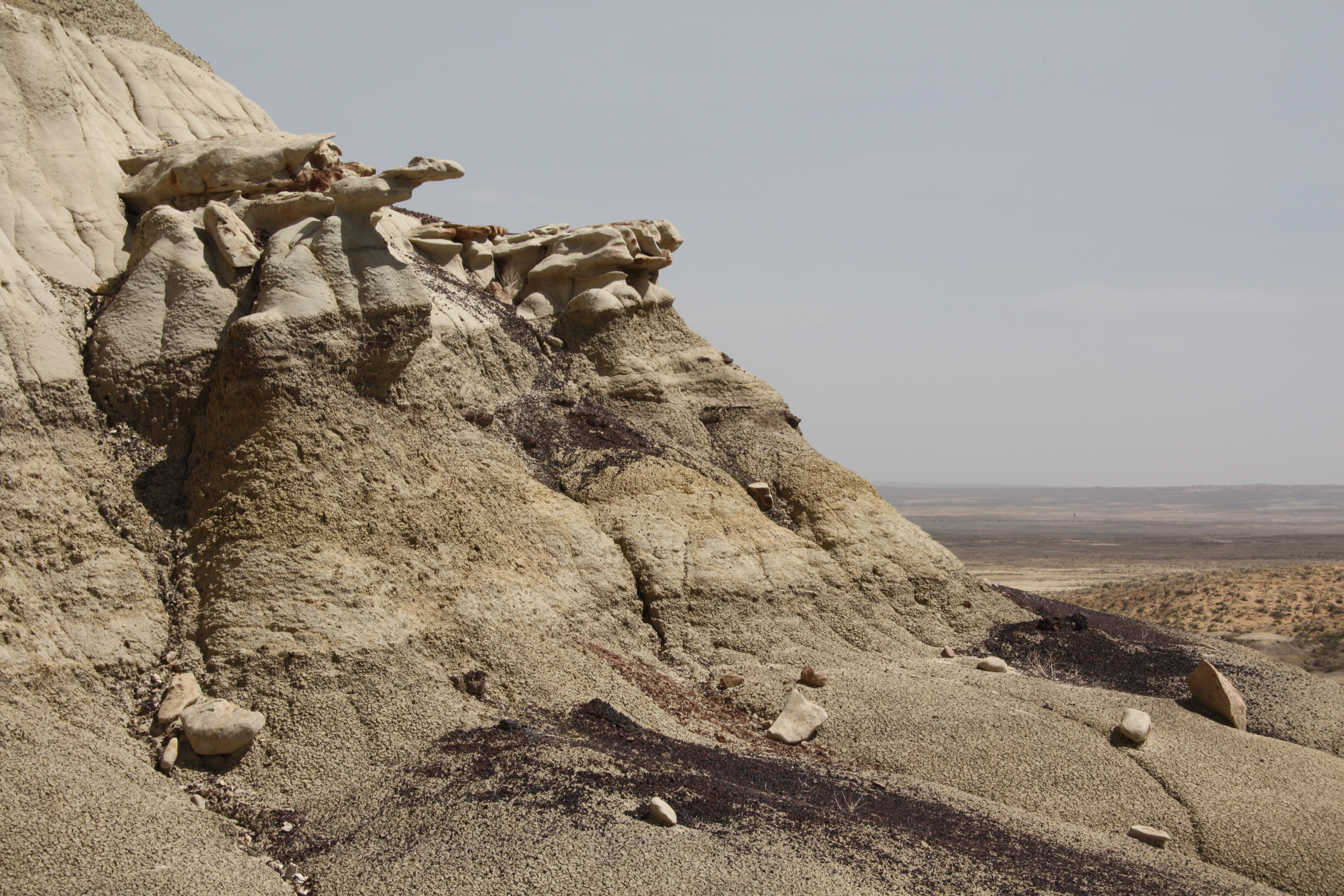
Kirtland Formation outcrops near Coal Creek

The Kirtland Formation (originally the Kirtland Shale) is a sedimentary geological formation.

== Description ==
The Kirtland Formation is the product of alluvial muds and overbank sand deposits from the many channels draining the coastal plain that existed on the inland seashore of North America, in the late Cretaceous period. It overlies the Fruitland Formation. It is found in the San Juan Basin in the states of New Mexico and Colorado, in the United States of America.

The base of the Kirtland Formation and its lowest sub-unit, the Hunter Wash Member, has been dated to 75.02 ± 0.13 Ma. Together with the upper part of the underlying Fruitland Formation, this contains fossils representing the Hunter Wash local fauna. The border between the Hunter Wash Member and overlying Farmington Member dates to approximately 74 million years ago. The top of the Farmington Member and bottom of the overlying De-na-zin Member has been radiometrically dated to 73.83 ± 0.18 Ma ago. The top of the De-na-zin Member, which contains the Willow Wash local fauna, has been dated to 73.49 ± 0.25 Ma ago.

Overlying the De-na-zin Member is a unit called the Naashoibito Member. This has often been considered to be part of the Kirtland formation, but more recently has been transferred back to the overlying Ojo Alamo Formation, which it had originally been part of.

== History of investigation ==
The formation was named by C.M. Bauer in 1916 for exposures near the Kirtland Post Office.

== Stratigraphy ==
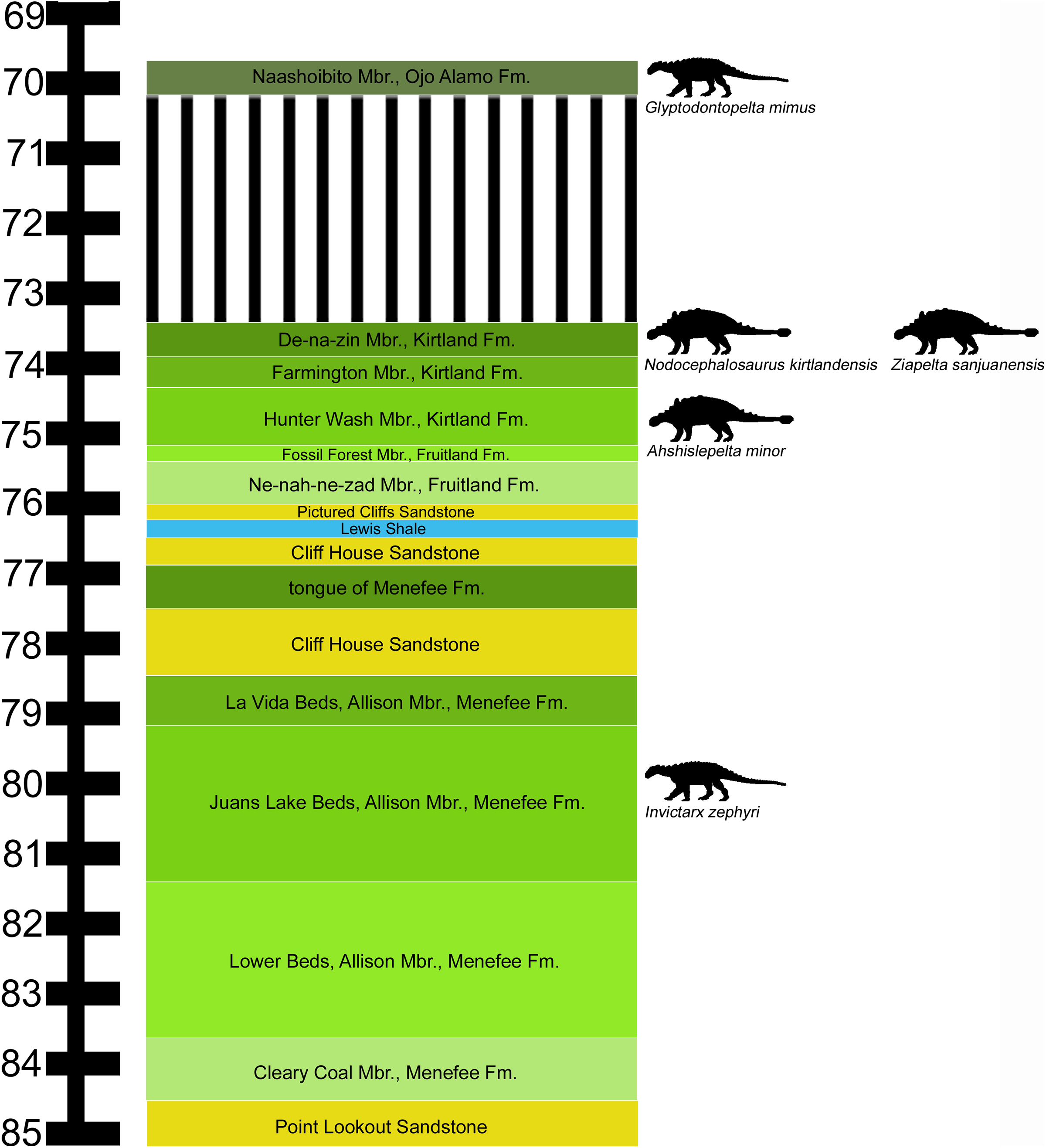
Upper Cretaceous stratigraphy of the San Juan Basin

== Vertebrate paleofauna ==
Color key: Taxon / Reclassified taxon / Taxon falsely reported as present / Dubious taxon or junior synonym / Ichnotaxon / Ootaxon / Morphotaxon	Notes; Uncertain or tentative taxa are in small text; ~~crossed out~~ taxa are discredited.

=== Dinosaurs ===
==== Ornithischians ====
===== Ankylosaurids =====
Ankylosaurids reported from the Kirtland Formation
Genus	Species	Member	Material	Notes	Images
Ahshislepelta	A. minor	Hunter Wash	A partial girdle, scapulocoracoids, humerus, proximal portion of the radius, cervical and/or dorsal vertebrae, complete and fragmentary thoracic osteoderms, and other unidentifiable postcranial fragments.	An ankylosaurine ankylosaurid part of the Hunter Wash Member.	Ahshislepelta Ziapelta
Nodocephalosaurus	N. kirtlandensis	De-na-zin	A partial skull.	An ankylosaurine ankylosaurid that has cranial ornamentation similar to Akainacephalus, an ankylosaur from the Kaiparowits Formation.	Ahshislepelta Ziapelta
Ziapelta	Z. sanjuanensis	Hunter Wash; De-na-zin	A complete skull, [two] first cervical half-rings, fragmentary second cervical half ring, and numerous fragmentary osteoderms.	An ankylosaurine ankylosaurid closely related to Scolosaurus.	Ahshislepelta Ziapelta

===== Ceratopsians =====
Ceratopsians reported from the Kirtland Formation
Genus	Species	Member	Material	Notes	Images
Bisticeratops	B. froeseorum	Farmington	A nearly complete skull.	A chasmosaurine ceratopsid, originally identified as a specimen of Pentaceratops.	Bisticeratops Pentaceratops Terminocavus Navajoceratops Titanoceratops
Navajoceratops	N. sullivani	Hunter Wash	A parietal, squamosal fragments, fused jugal\epijugal and other unidentified cranial fragments.	A chasmosaurine ceratopsid that has been hypothesized to form an anagenetic series with several other chasmosaur species, including Terminocavus.	Bisticeratops Pentaceratops Terminocavus Navajoceratops Titanoceratops
Pentaceratops	P. fenestratus		A near-complete skull.	Holotype considered undiagnostic. May be the same as Navajoceratops or Terminocavus.	Bisticeratops Pentaceratops Terminocavus Navajoceratops Titanoceratops
Pentaceratops	P. sternbergi			A chasmosaurine ceratopsid. Specimens from the Kirtland Formation have been reassigned to Navajoceratops, Terminocavus, and Bisticeratops, with definitive specimens limited to the Fruitland Formation.	Bisticeratops Pentaceratops Terminocavus Navajoceratops Titanoceratops
Terminocavus	T. sealeyi	Hunter Wash	A parietal, partial squamosal, jugal, epijugal, partial quadratojugal, partial sacrum and vertebral fragments.	A chasmosaurine ceratopsid that has been hypothesized to form an anagenetic series with several other chasmosaur species, including Navajoceratops.	Bisticeratops Pentaceratops Terminocavus Navajoceratops Titanoceratops
Titanoceratops	T. ouranos		A partial skull, syncervical vertebrae, cervical vertebrae, dorsal vertebrae, sacral vertebrae, caudal vertebrae, ribs, humeri, radius, femora, tibiae, fibula, ilia, ischia, and ossified tendons.	Possibly represents a junior synonym of Pentaceratops, holotype may possibly have come from the Fruitland Formation.	Bisticeratops Pentaceratops Terminocavus Navajoceratops Titanoceratops

===== Pachycephalosaurids =====
Pachycephalosaurids reported from the Kirtland Formation
Genus	Species	Member	Material	Notes	Images
Sphaerotholus	S. goodwini	De-na-zin	A partial skull lacking the facial and palatal elements.	A pachycephalosaurine pachycephalosaurid.	Stegoceras Sphaerotholus
Stegoceras	S. novomexicanum	Hunter Wash	An incomplete parietal.	A basal pachycephalosaurid also known from the upper Fruitland Formation.	Stegoceras Sphaerotholus

===== Ornithopods =====
Ornithopods reported from the Kirtland Formation
Genus	Species	Member	Material	Notes	Images
Ahshislesaurus	A. wimani	Hunter Wash	A partial skull and mandible, three cervical vertebrae	A kritosaurin hadrosaurid from the Hunter Wash Member. Several isolated bones and a partial skeleton from the same strata may also belong to this taxon	Ahshislesaurus Anasazisaurus Kritosaurus Naashoibitosaurus
Anasazisaurus	A. horneri	Farmington	An incomplete skull consisting of premaxillae, nasals, maxilla, lacrimal, jugal, prefrontal, postorbital, squamosal, frontal, parietal, and fragment of dentary with teeth.	A kritosaurin hadrosaurid from the Farmington Member.	Ahshislesaurus Anasazisaurus Kritosaurus Naashoibitosaurus
Kritosaurus	K. navajovius	De-na-zin	[Two] incomplete skulls, an atlas, axis and cervical vertebrae.	A kritosaurin hadrosaurid also known from the Cerro del Pueblo Formation of Mexico.	Ahshislesaurus Anasazisaurus Kritosaurus Naashoibitosaurus
Naashoibitosaurus	N.ostromi	De-na-zin	A skull lacking the premaxillae and mandible, a partial humerus, cervical vertebrae and dorsal vertebrae.	A kritosaurin hadrosaurid, distinct from Kritosaurus.	Ahshislesaurus Anasazisaurus Kritosaurus Naashoibitosaurus
Parasaurolophus	P. tubicen	De-na-zin	[Two] incomplete and fragmentary skulls.	A lambeosaurine hadrosaurid known from partial cranial remains.	Ahshislesaurus Anasazisaurus Kritosaurus Naashoibitosaurus
Parasaurolophus	P. cyrtocristatus	Hunter Wash	Partial skull and nearly complete skeleton, partial juvenile skull.	May instead be from the upper Fruitland Formation.	Ahshislesaurus Anasazisaurus Kritosaurus Naashoibitosaurus

==== Saurischians ====
===== Sauropods =====
Sauropods of the Kirtland Formation
Genus	Species	Member	Material	Notes	Images
Alamosaurus	A. sanjuanensis			Specimens actually from the Naashoibito member of the Ojo Alamo Formation	Alamosaurus

==== Theropods ====
Theropods of the Kirtland Formation
Genus	Species	Member	Material	Notes	Images
Aublysodon	A. mirandus	Hunter Wash		Remains are now referred to Bistahieversor, although these remains may possibly have come from the Fruitland Formation.	Bistahieversor Dinevenator Saurornitholestes Struthiomimus Indeterminate tyrannosaurin
Bistahieversor	B. sealeyi	Hunter Wash	An articulated skull and undescribed postcranial skeleton of an adult individual, and an incomplete skull and postcranial skeleton of a juvenile individual.	A eutyrannosaur tyrannosauroid also known from the Fruitland Formation.	Bistahieversor Dinevenator Saurornitholestes Struthiomimus Indeterminate tyrannosaurin
Caenagnathidae	Indeterminate	De-na-zin	A nearly complete right tibia	Indeterminate caenagnathid remains.	Bistahieversor Dinevenator Saurornitholestes Struthiomimus Indeterminate tyrannosaurin
Daspletosaurus	Indeterminate	Hunter Wash		Remains are now referred to Bistahieversor, although these remains may possibly have come from the Fruitland Formation.	Bistahieversor Dinevenator Saurornitholestes Struthiomimus Indeterminate tyrannosaurin
Dinevenator	D. robustus	De-na-zin	A nearly complete frontal	Originally assigned to Saurornitholestes, subsequently recognized as a troodontid, and tentatively assigned to the genus Xenovenator in early 2026. Moved to its own genus later that year.	Bistahieversor Dinevenator Saurornitholestes Struthiomimus Indeterminate tyrannosaurin
Dromaeosauridae	Indeterminate		Numerous isolated teeth.	Indeterminate dromaeosaurid remains.	Bistahieversor Dinevenator Saurornitholestes Struthiomimus Indeterminate tyrannosaurin
Ornithomimidae	Indeterminate	De-na-zin	A distal end of a phalanx, and [two] partial manual unguals.	Indeterminate ornithomimid remains.	Bistahieversor Dinevenator Saurornitholestes Struthiomimus Indeterminate tyrannosaurin
Saurornitholestes	S. sullivani	De-na-zin	A nearly complete frontal.	A saurornitholestine dromaeosaurid, sister taxa to Saurornitholestes langstoni.	Bistahieversor Dinevenator Saurornitholestes Struthiomimus Indeterminate tyrannosaurin
Struthiomimus	cf. S. altus		A centrum of a dorsal vertebra, distal portion of a metatarsal, and proximal phalanx.	Indeterminate remains that may belong to Struthiomimus altus.	Bistahieversor Dinevenator Saurornitholestes Struthiomimus Indeterminate tyrannosaurin
Tyrannosauridae	Indeterminate		A partial skeleton, dentary, metatarsal, and numerous teeth.	Indeterminate tyrannosaurid material.	Bistahieversor Dinevenator Saurornitholestes Struthiomimus Indeterminate tyrannosaurin
cf. Tyrannosaurini	Indeterminate	Hunter Wash	A left tibia.	Indeterminate tyrannosaurin material.	Bistahieversor Dinevenator Saurornitholestes Struthiomimus Indeterminate tyrannosaurin

=== Pterosaurs ===
Pterosaurs of the Kirtland Formation						
Genus	Species	Location	Member	Abundance	Notes	Images
Navajodactylus	N. boerei		Hunter Wash Member	Partial phalanx and ulna fragment	A possible azhdarchid pterosaur known from fragmentary remains.	

=== Crurotarsans ===
Crurotarsans of the Kirtland Formation
Genus	Species	Location	Member	Abundance	Notes	Images
Brachychampsa	B. montana		De-na-zin		Member of the Willow Wash local fauna.	
Denazinosuchus	D. kirtlandicus		De-na-zin		Member of the Willow Wash local fauna.	
Leidyosuchus (Note: Listed as "cf. Leidyosuchus sp.")	Indeterminate		De-na-zin		Member of the Willow Wash local fauna.	

=== Turtles ===
Turtles of the Kirtland Formation						
Genus	Species	Location	Member	Abundance	Notes	Images
Basilemys	B. nobilis		De-na-zin		Member of the Willow Wash local fauna.	
Denazinemys	D. nodosa		De-na-zin		Member of the Willow Wash local fauna.	
Neurankylus	N. baueri		De-na-zin		Member of the Willow Wash local fauna.	
Plastomenus	P. robustus		De-na-zin		Member of the Willow Wash local fauna.	
Thescelus	T. hemispherica		De-na-zin		Member of the Willow Wash local fauna.	

=== Bony fish ===
Bony fishes of the Kirtland Formation
Genus	Species	Location	Member	Abundance	Notes
Melvius	M. chauliodous		De-na-zin		Member of the Willow Wash local fauna.

=== Cartilaginous fish ===
Cartilaginous fish of the Kirtland Formation
Genus	Species	Location	Member	Abundance	Notes
Myledaphus	M. bipartitus		De-na-zin		Member of the Willow Wash local fauna.

Color key: Taxon / Reclassified taxon / Taxon falsely reported as present / Dubious taxon or junior synonym / Ichnotaxon / Ootaxon / Morphotaxon	Notes; Uncertain or tentative taxa are in small text; ~~crossed out~~ taxa are discredited.

== See also ==
- List of stratigraphic units with dinosaur body fossils
