= Almond Formation =

Geological formation in Wyoming, U.S.

- Stratigraphic range: Campanian–Maastrichtian; 73.6–71.1 Ma
- Type: Geological formation
- Underlies: Lewis Shale
- Overlies: Ericson Formation

Lithology
- Primary: Sandstone
- Other: Siltstone, shale, coal

Location
- Region: Wyoming
- Country: United States

The Almond Formation is a geological formation of Late Cretaceous (Late Campanian-Early Maastrichtian) age in Wyoming. It was deposited in marsh, deltaic, lagoonal, estuarine, and shallow marine environments along the western shore of the Western Interior Seaway. It consists primarily of fine- to medium-grained sandstone, siltstone, shale, and coal. Fossils from the Almond Formation include remains of dinosaurs and plants.

== Vertebrate paleofauna ==
=== Dinosaurs ===
Color key: Taxon / Reclassified taxon / Taxon falsely reported as present / Dubious taxon or junior synonym / Ichnotaxon / Ootaxon / Morphotaxon	Notes; Uncertain or tentative taxa are in small text; ~~crossed out~~ taxa are discredited.

Dinosaurs of the Almond Formation
Genus	Species	Location	Stratigraphic position	Material	Notes	Images
Anchiceratops	Indeterminate				Represents a new genus and species of unnamed ceratopsid	Dromaeosaurus Edmontonia Edmontosaurus Thescelosaurus Unnamed chasmosaurine ceratopsid
Dromaeosaurus	Indeterminate					Dromaeosaurus Edmontonia Edmontosaurus Thescelosaurus Unnamed chasmosaurine ceratopsid
Edmontonia	Indeterminate					Dromaeosaurus Edmontonia Edmontosaurus Thescelosaurus Unnamed chasmosaurine ceratopsid
Edmontosaurus	Indeterminate					Dromaeosaurus Edmontonia Edmontosaurus Thescelosaurus Unnamed chasmosaurine ceratopsid
Maiasaura	Indeterminate					Dromaeosaurus Edmontonia Edmontosaurus Thescelosaurus Unnamed chasmosaurine ceratopsid
Paronychodon	P. lacustris					Dromaeosaurus Edmontonia Edmontosaurus Thescelosaurus Unnamed chasmosaurine ceratopsid
Saurolophus	S. sp.			One specimen (AMNH 3651) consisting of partial cranial and postcranial remains, as well as skin impressions		Dromaeosaurus Edmontonia Edmontosaurus Thescelosaurus Unnamed chasmosaurine ceratopsid
Thescelosaurus	Indeterminate					Dromaeosaurus Edmontonia Edmontosaurus Thescelosaurus Unnamed chasmosaurine ceratopsid
Unnamed chasmosaurine ceratopsid	Unnamed				Misidentified as Anchiceratops, it is actually a new species of Pentaceratops-like form that is the sister taxon to Bisticeratops. Holotype was discovered in 1937.	Dromaeosaurus Edmontonia Edmontosaurus Thescelosaurus Unnamed chasmosaurine ceratopsid

=== Other vertebrates ===
Non-dinosaur vertebrates found in the Almond Formation include crocodyliforms (indet.), turtles (Adocus cf. and Basilemys cf.), and ray-finned fish (Ichthyodectidae indet.).

== See also ==
- List of dinosaur-bearing rock formations
