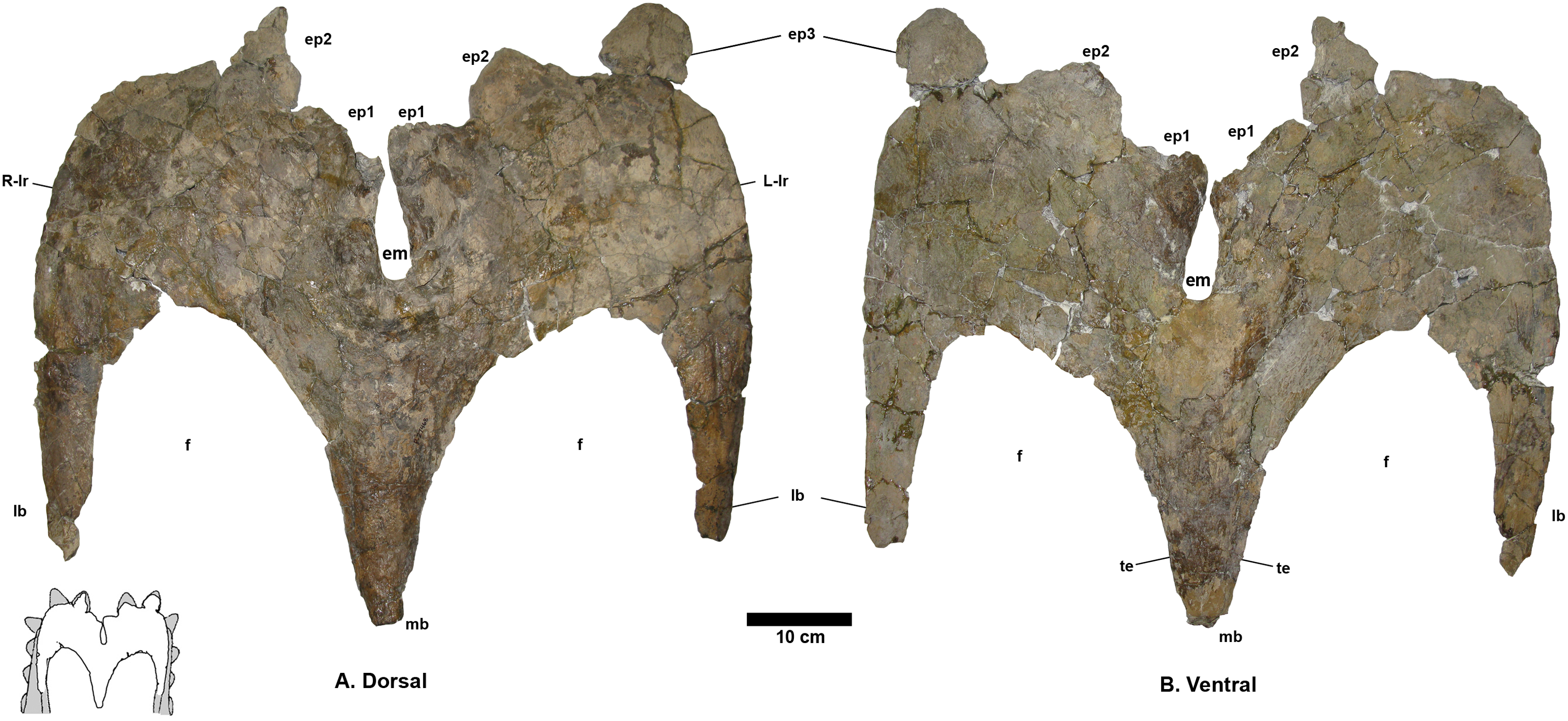
- Holotype parietals from the front and back

Scientific classification
- Kingdom: Animalia
- Phylum: Chordata
- Class: Reptilia
- Clade: Dinosauria
- Clade: †Ornithischia
- Clade: †Ceratopsia
- Family: †Ceratopsidae
- Subfamily: †Chasmosaurinae
- Genus: †Terminocavus; Fowler & Freedman Fowler, 2020

Type species
- †Terminocavus sealeyi Fowler & Freedman Fowler, 2020

= Terminocavus =

Terminocavus Temporal range: Late Cretaceous, ~75.0–74.6 Ma

Genus of ceratopsid dinosaurs (fossil)

Terminocavus is a genus of ceratopsid dinosaur from the late Cretaceous Period of what is now North America. The genus contains a single species, the type species Terminocavus sealeyi, known from a parietal and some other associated fragments. The holotype specimen was discovered in the Kirtland Formation of New Mexico in 1997, and was later described and named in a 2020 study. It was similar in anatomy to Pentaceratops and Anchiceratops, which it was closely related to, but had a distinctive heart-shaped upper frill with very narrow notch. It has been hypothesized to form an anagenetic series with several other chasmosaur species.

== Discovery and naming ==
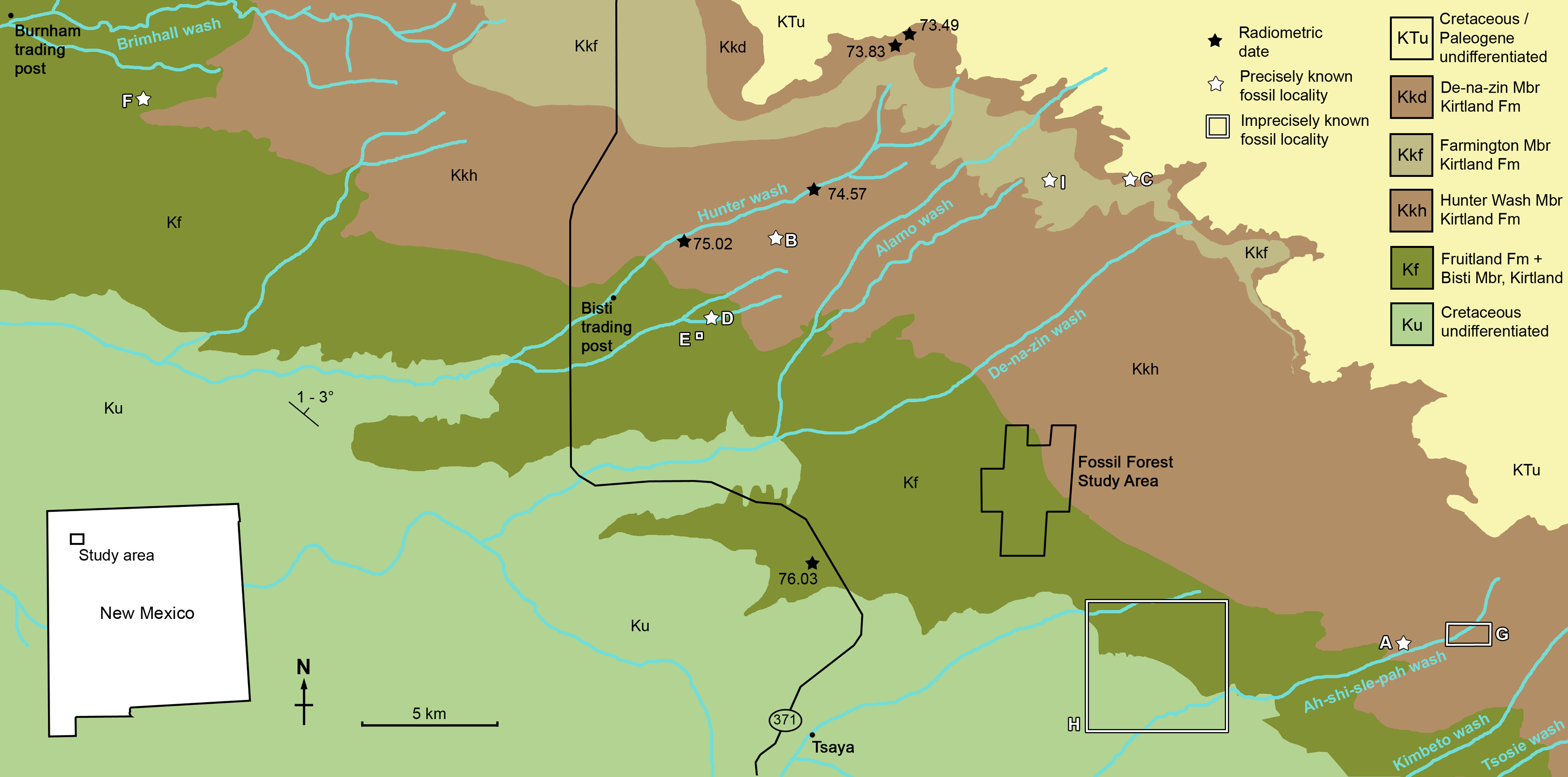
Geological map of the southeast San Juan Basin; B (upper middle) is where the holotype was found

The holotype specimen NMMNH P-27468, collected in 1997, consists of a parietal (or fused paired parietals), other skull fragments, a partial sacrum, and vertebral fragments. It was discovered in grey siltstone deposits from the Campanian Hunter Wash Member of the Kirtland Formation of the San Juan Basin in New Mexico. It is the only diagnostic chasmosaurine specimen discovered from the middle or upper part of the Hunter Wash Member. The age of the specimen is undetermined; its frill texture indicates it is a young subadult, but its large size and epiparietal fusion would indicate it represents an adult.

A 2005 abstract referred the specimen to the genus Pentaceratops, though noted as aberrant for the genus. Joshua Fry questioned the referral in a 2015 masters thesis, with a phylogenetic analysis failing to group it alongside other Pentaceratops specimens. It was informally named as a distinct genus in 2016. Later, in 2020, it was formally named and described by Denver W. Fowler and Elizabeth A. Freedman Fowler. The name Terminocavus means "coming to the end of the cavity", referring to the parietal embayment being nearly closed off before being lost completely in more derived taxa. The specific name, sealeyi, refers to the discoverer of the holotype specimen, Paul Sealey. Naming the specimen as a new species of Pentaceratops was decided against to prevent the genus becoming paraphyletic.

The nearly complete, but highly distorted skull PMU 24923 may belong to the species as well. Also hailing from the Kirtland Formation, Charles H. Sternberg discovered it in 1921. It was later named as the new species "Pentaceratops fenestratus" in 1930, but by future authors have considered its distinctiveness to be a result of pathology. Though sometimes considered a synonym of Pentaceratops sternbergi, Fowler and Freedman Fowler considered it more likely to belong to either Navajoceratops or Terminocavus due to its deep, narrow median embayment and broad parietal bar. The specimen is too distorted to allow confident referral to either, however.

== Description ==
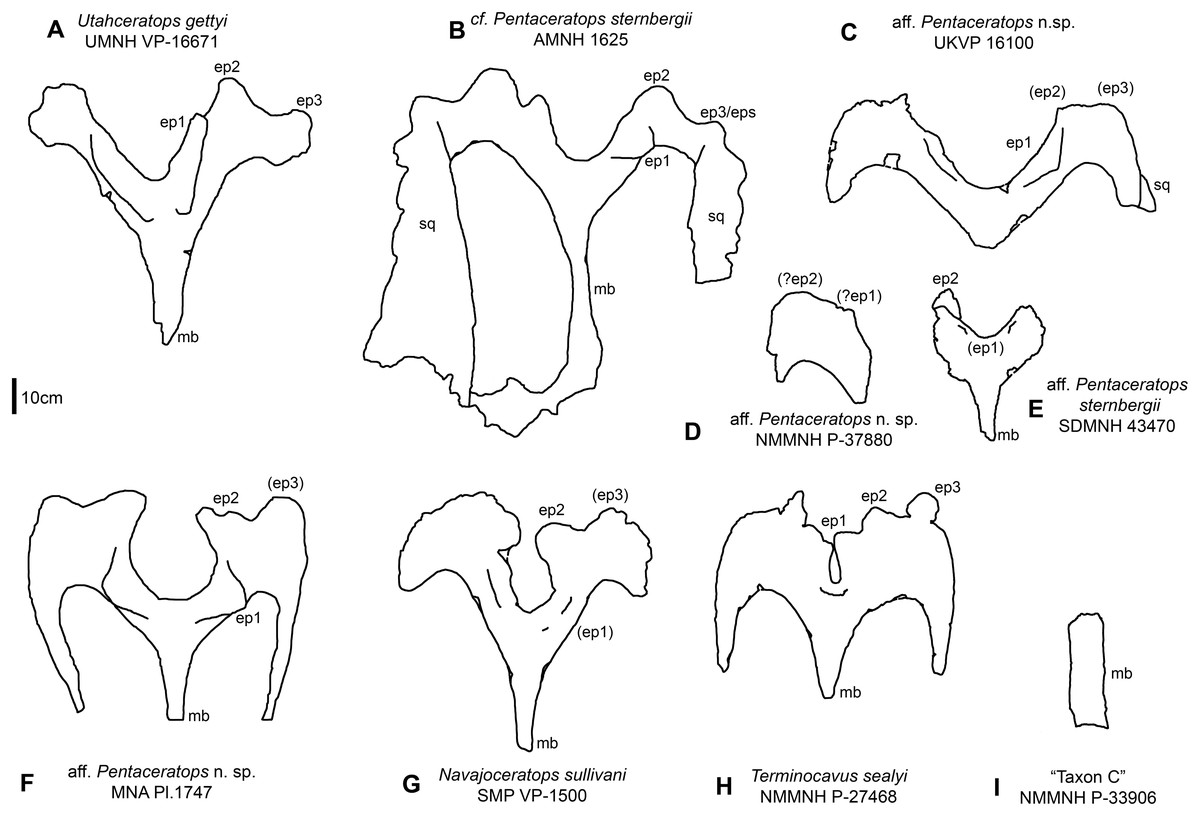
Preserved parietal anatomy of Terminocavus (H, lower right) compared to its close relatives

Known from limited material, Terminocavus is distinguished from close relatives such as Pentaceratops and Anchiceratops by the anatomy of its parietal (the upper portion of its frill), which forms a heart shape. The prominent median embayment (a large notch in the middle of the top of the frill) of earlier relatives is heavily reduced, being very narrow as opposed to wide and U-shaped. Terminocavus' parietal bars (the top edges of the frill) are thin and extremely broad compared to earlier relatives; they are more plate-shaped than bar-shaped. Its median bar (the middle strut) has also expanded, bearing more pronounced flanges than its ancestor Navajoceratops. The parietal fenestrae (the holes in the frill) have a more rounded shape than the ancestral angular state, and are smaller due to the expanded parietal and median bars. Overall, the anatomy is intermediate between that of more primitive genera like Pentaceratops and that of more derived ones like Anchiceratops and triceratopsins.

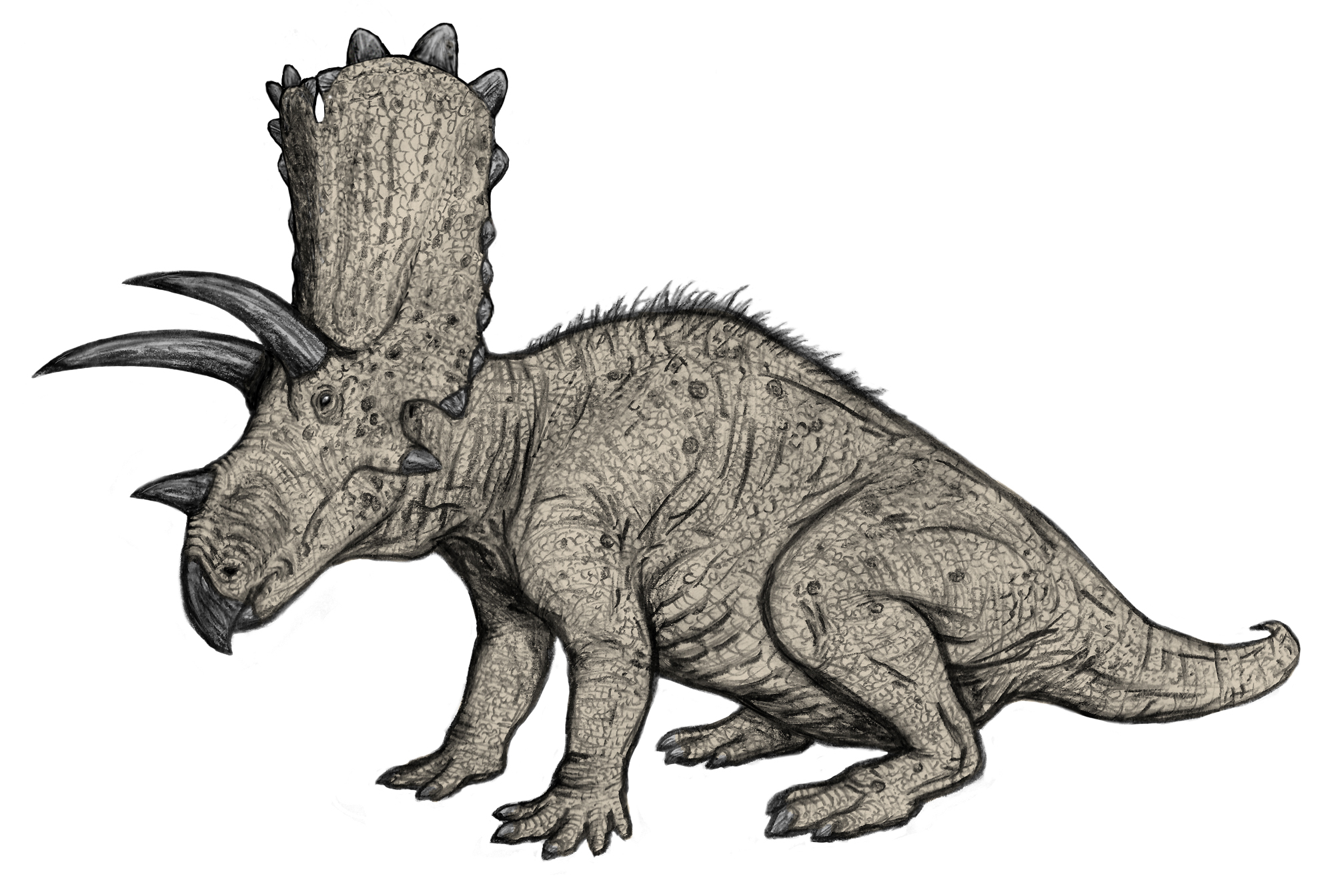
Life restoration

Like most other chasmosaurs, its paired fused parietals combined bear six epiparietals (small horns along the parietal), symmetrically arranged with three on each side. The first pair, small and triangular, project from the top edge of the median embayment, and in life would have touched each other. The second pair are a larger set of triangles, whereas the third epiparietals have a rounded, "D" shape; both project upwards, angled in line with the rest of the parietal. The preserved right squamosal (bone which forms the right side of the frill) itself is long, indicating adult Terminocavus had a very large frill similar to that of its relatives. A singular, fused episquamosal (small horns along the squamosal) is also known from the holotype; it is rugose and indistinct from that of other ceratopsids. The left epijugal horn is known as well, fused to the jugal and quadratojugal bones; it robust and large, but unlike that of Pentaceratops is not especially long.

Terminocavus known remains are slightly smaller than those of Utahceratops and Pentaceratops, indicating it was an animal of roughly similar adult size.

== Classification ==
Terminocavus was a member of the ceratopsid subfamily Chasmosaurinae. Fowler and Freedman Folwler (2020) divide chasmosaurs into two lineages; a "Chasmosaurus-line" leading to Kosmoceratops and a "Pentaceratops-line" leading to more derived taxa. Terminocavus belongs to the latter group. Phylogenetic analysis found it to be relatively derived, more basal than Anchiceratops but more derived than Navajocertops. The tree, however, is unstable; removing some taxa from the analysis caused much of the Pentaceratops-line to collapse into an unresolved polytomy. Additionally, it was noted the coding of the Pentaceratops and Chasmosaurus data may requires revision, as it likely contains specimens of more than one species; it was noted this could be impacting the results negatively. Several taxa had been named too recently to be included in the study describing Terminocavus, and their inclusion in an analysis could also shift its position. One analysis from Fowler and Freedman Fowler (2020) is reproduced below:

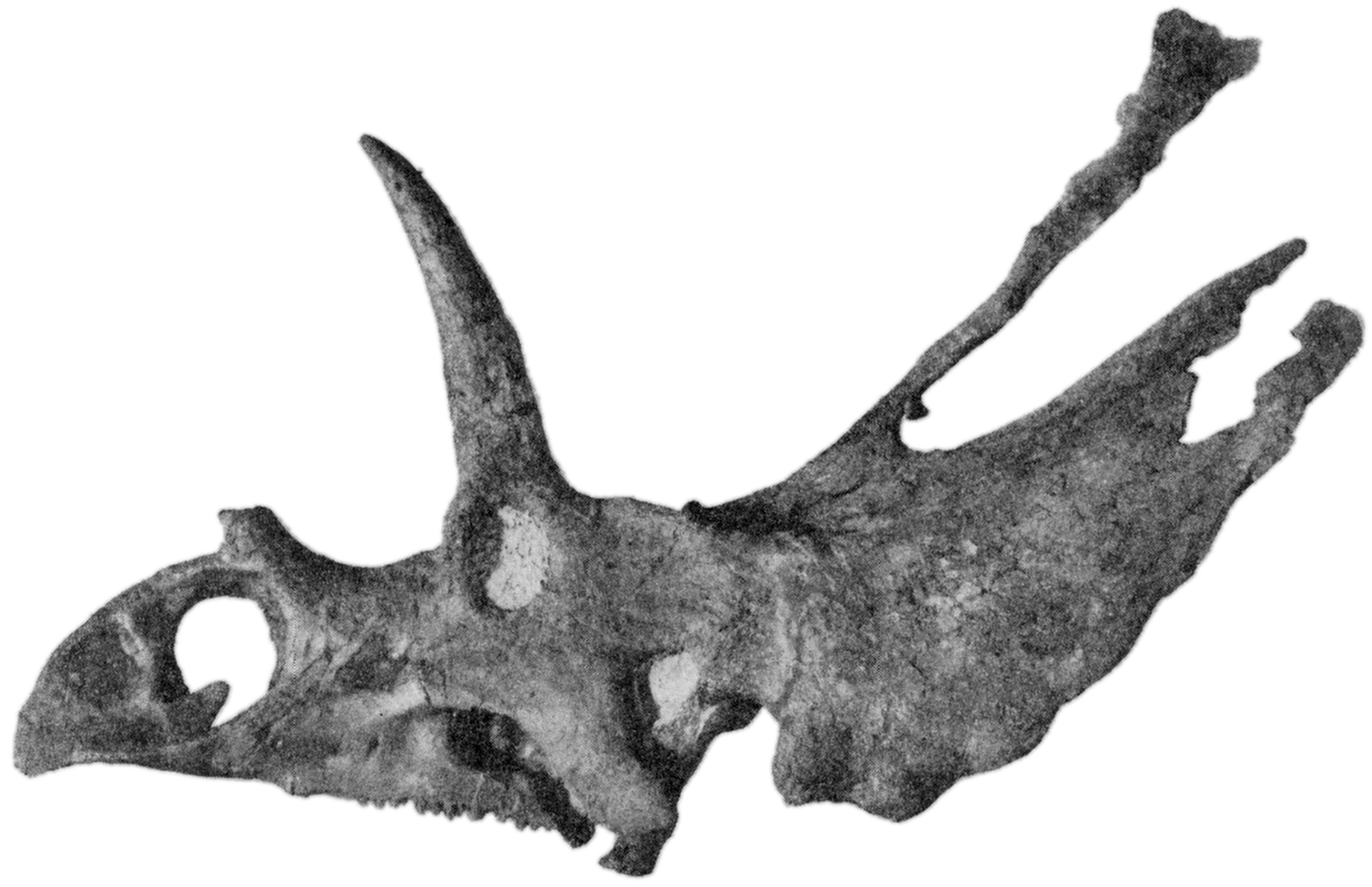
Skull of Pentaceratops, proposed ancestor of Terminocavus

- Chasmosaurinae
  - - Chasmosaurus
    - - Vagaceratops
      - Kosmoceratops
  - - - Coahuilaceratops
      - - Pentaceratops
        - Utahceratops
    - - Navajoceratops
      - - Terminocavus
        - - Anchiceratops
          - - Arrhinoceratops
            - Triceratopsini

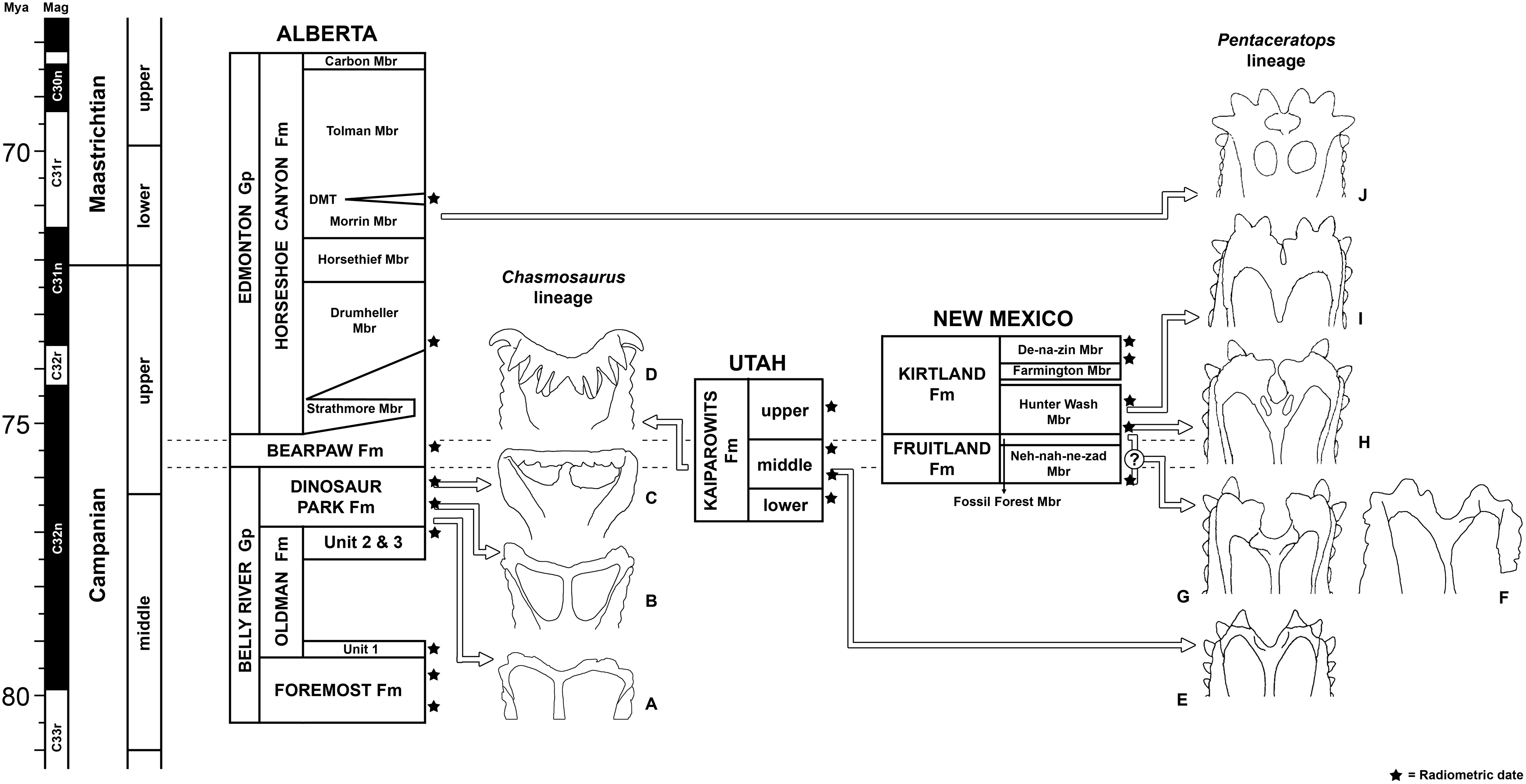
Stratigraphic diagram demonstrating the proposed anagenetic lineages of chasmosaurs; frill of Terminocavus is "I", upper right, shown next to that of its close relatives

It was proposed that Terminocavus is a part of a long anagenetic lineage of chasmosaurs. The genera (in sequence) Utahceratops, Pentaceratops, Navajoceratops, Terminocavus, and Anchiceratops would, under this model, represent a single population of organisms changing in form over time, rather than as a diverse assemblage of close relatives. This is evidenced by their parietal morphology, which show consistent trends of change. These are: the gradual closure of the initially large medial embayment, flattening and expansion of the parietal bar, reduction of size of the parietal fenestrae, the change of its shape from (sub)angular to round, and development of flanges on the medial bar. Geometric morphometric analysis supported the sequence, finding them to plot in the expected order. The phylogenetic analysis (see above), however, complicated matters, with the genera Coahuilaceratops and Bravoceratops plotting within the supposed anagenetic lineage. It was noted, however, that these are fragmentary and undiagnostic respectively, and so they may not be of significance.

== See also ==
- Timeline of ceratopsian research
