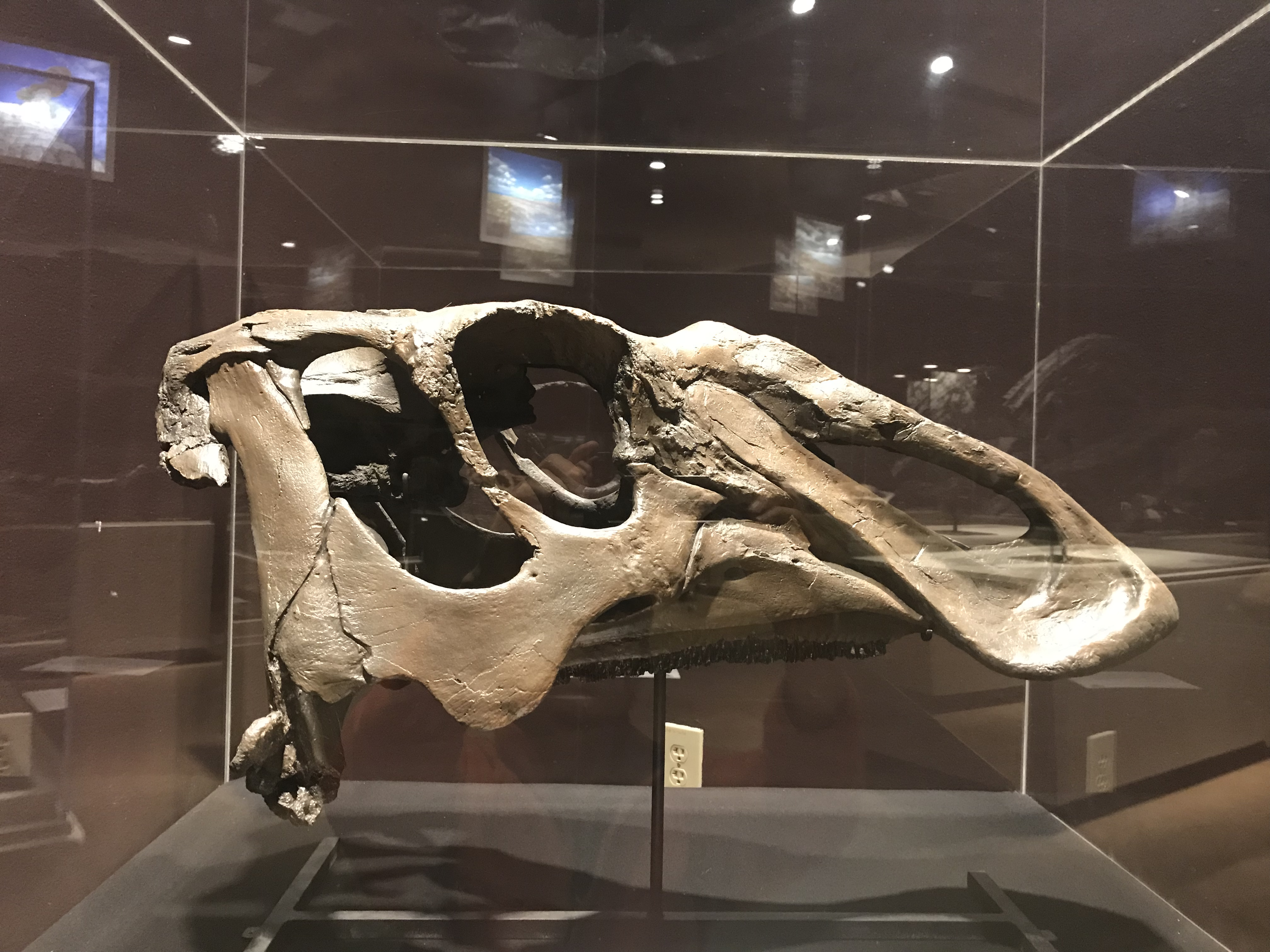
- Skull

Scientific classification
- Kingdom: Animalia
- Phylum: Chordata
- Class: Reptilia
- Clade: Dinosauria
- Clade: †Ornithischia
- Clade: †Ornithopoda
- Family: †Hadrosauridae
- Subfamily: †Saurolophinae
- Tribe: †Kritosaurini
- Genus: †Naashoibitosaurus; Hunt and Lucas, 1993

Type species
- Naashoibitosaurus ostromi Hunt and Lucas, 1993

= Naashoibitosaurus =

Naashoibitosaurus Temporal range: Late Cretaceous, 73 Ma

Extinct genus of dinosaurs

Naashoibitosaurus (from Navajo naʼashǫ́ʼii bitooh—"creek lizard") is a genus of hadrosaurid dinosaur that lived about 73 million years ago, in the Late Cretaceous, and was found in the Kirtland Formation of the San Juan Basin in New Mexico, United States. Only a partial skeleton has been found to date. It was first described as a specimen of Kritosaurus by Jack Horner, and has been intertwined with the taxon since its description.

== History ==
Befitting a genus with a confusing taxonomic history, the name of this genus is based on an error. David Gillette and David Thomas collected the type and only known specimen from what was thought to be the Naashoibito Member of the Kirtland Formation, the youngest member of the Kirtland; this was commemorated in the name. Instead, it came from the older, late Campanian-age De-na-zin Member. Horner described the skull in 1992 as that of an immature Kritosaurus, using it as evidence that Gryposaurus was different from Kritosaurus. At the same time, Hunt and Lucas were describing the postcrania as belonging to Edmontosaurus saskatchewanensis. When the disconnect became apparent, Hunt and Lucas gave the specimen its own generic name, because the skull did not agree with an edmontosaur, and they considered Kritosaurus indeterminate and thus not usable.

Their assessment was challenged in 2000 by Thomas Williamson, who found the morphological differences between it and Kritosaurus to be due to the skulls in question being from individuals of different ages. Unlike Hunt and Lucas, he considered the type skull of Kritosaurus to be diagnostic and thus could compare it to Naashoibitosaurus. He returned to Horner's argument, noting as Horner had that the nasal crest in other hadrosaurines like Prosaurolophus moves back on the skull during growth. He also pointed out that the specimen's provenance was incorrect; instead of being from younger rocks than Kritosaurus, it is from rocks of about the same age. The next major review, in the second edition of The Dinosauria, again separated the two. The absence of the beak and lower jaw in the partial skull of Naashoibitosaurus makes comparison even more difficult.

A 2014 study agreed with previous authors that Naashoibitosaurus is similar to Kritosaurus, but found it to be a distinct species.

== Description ==
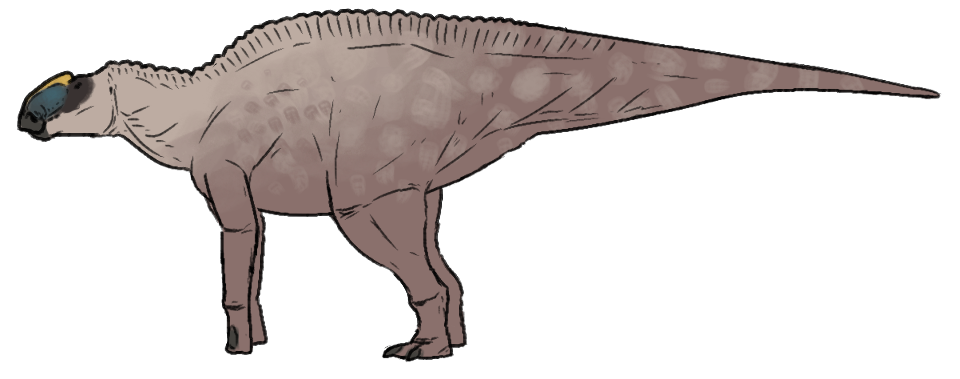
Life restoration

Naashoibitosaurus, based as it is on a single partial skeleton (NMMNH P-16106), is not well known in terms of anatomy. Its skull, the most thoroughly described portion, has a low nasal crest that peaks in front of the eyes, but does not strongly arch as in Gryposaurus.

== Classification ==
Naashoibitosaurus is a saurolophine hadrosaurid, a "flat-headed or solid-crested duckbill". It is closest to the solid-crested forms like Saurolophus. If it is the same as Kritosaurus, Kritosaurus would be used because it is the older name, but its position vis-a-vis other duckbills would be the same.

== Paleobiology ==
As a hadrosaurid, Naashoibitosaurus would have been a large bipedal/quadrupedal herbivore, eating plants with a sophisticated skull that permitted a grinding motion analogous to chewing. Its teeth were continually replacing and packed into dental batteries that contained hundreds of teeth, only a relative handful of which were in use at any time. Plant material would have been cropped by its broad beak, and held in the jaws by a cheek-like organ. Feeding would have been from the ground up to ~4 meters (13 ft) above. If it was a separate genus, how it would have partitioned resources with the similar Kritosaurus is unknown.

== See also ==
- Timeline of hadrosaur research
