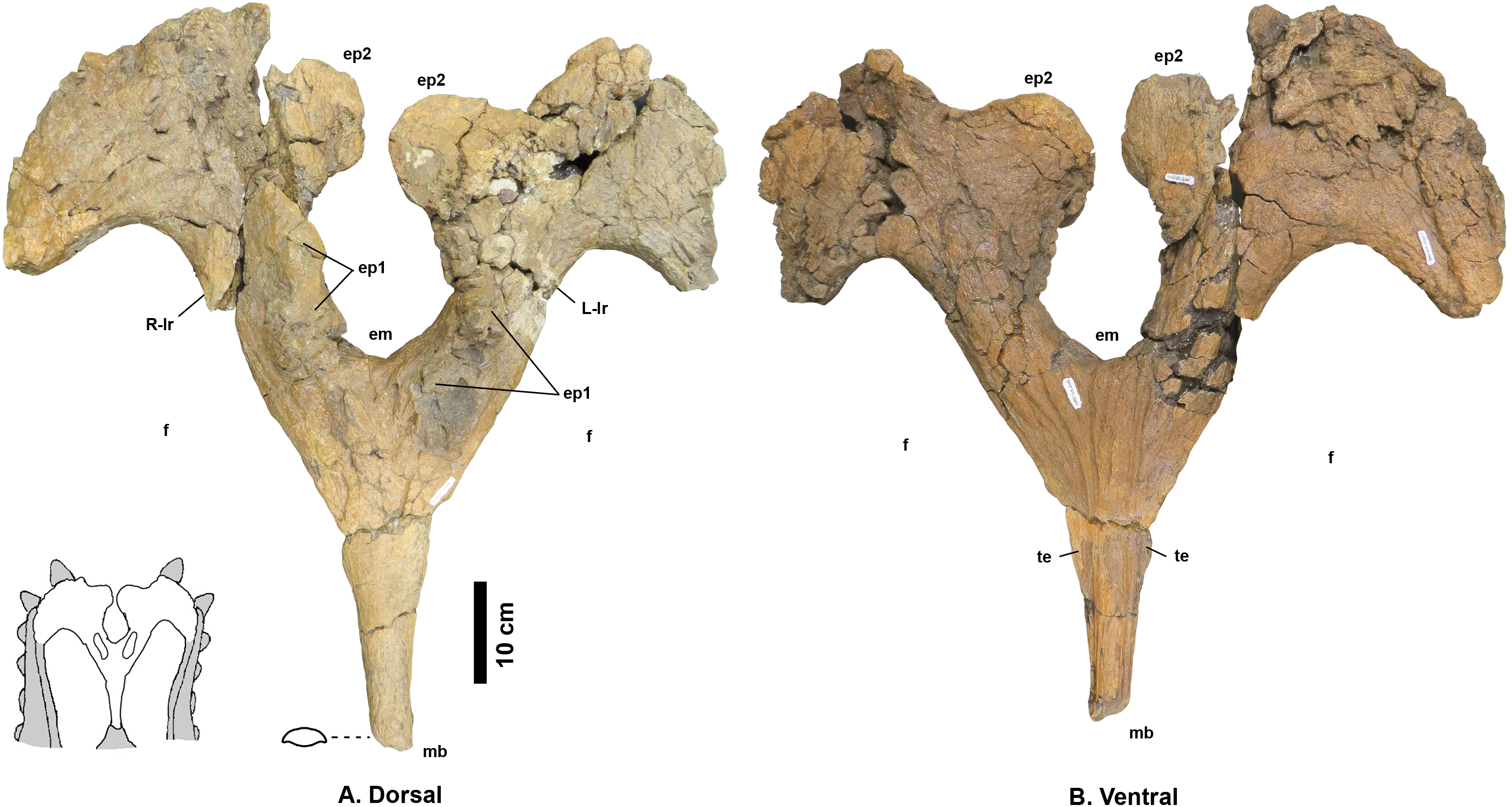
- Holotype parietals from the front and back

Scientific classification
- Kingdom: Animalia
- Phylum: Chordata
- Class: Reptilia
- Clade: Dinosauria
- Clade: †Ornithischia
- Clade: †Ceratopsia
- Family: †Ceratopsidae
- Subfamily: †Chasmosaurinae
- Genus: †Navajoceratops; Fowler and Freedman Fowler, 2020

Type species
- †Navajoceratops sullivani Fowler and Freedman Fowler, 2020

= Navajoceratops =

Navajoceratops Temporal range: Late Cretaceous, ~75.0–73.4 Ma

Extinct genus of dinosaurs

Navajoceratops (meaning "Navajo horned face") is a genus of ceratopsid dinosaur from the late Cretaceous Period of what is now North America. The genus contains a single species, N. sullivani, named after Robert M. Sullivan, leader of the expeditions that recovered the holotype.

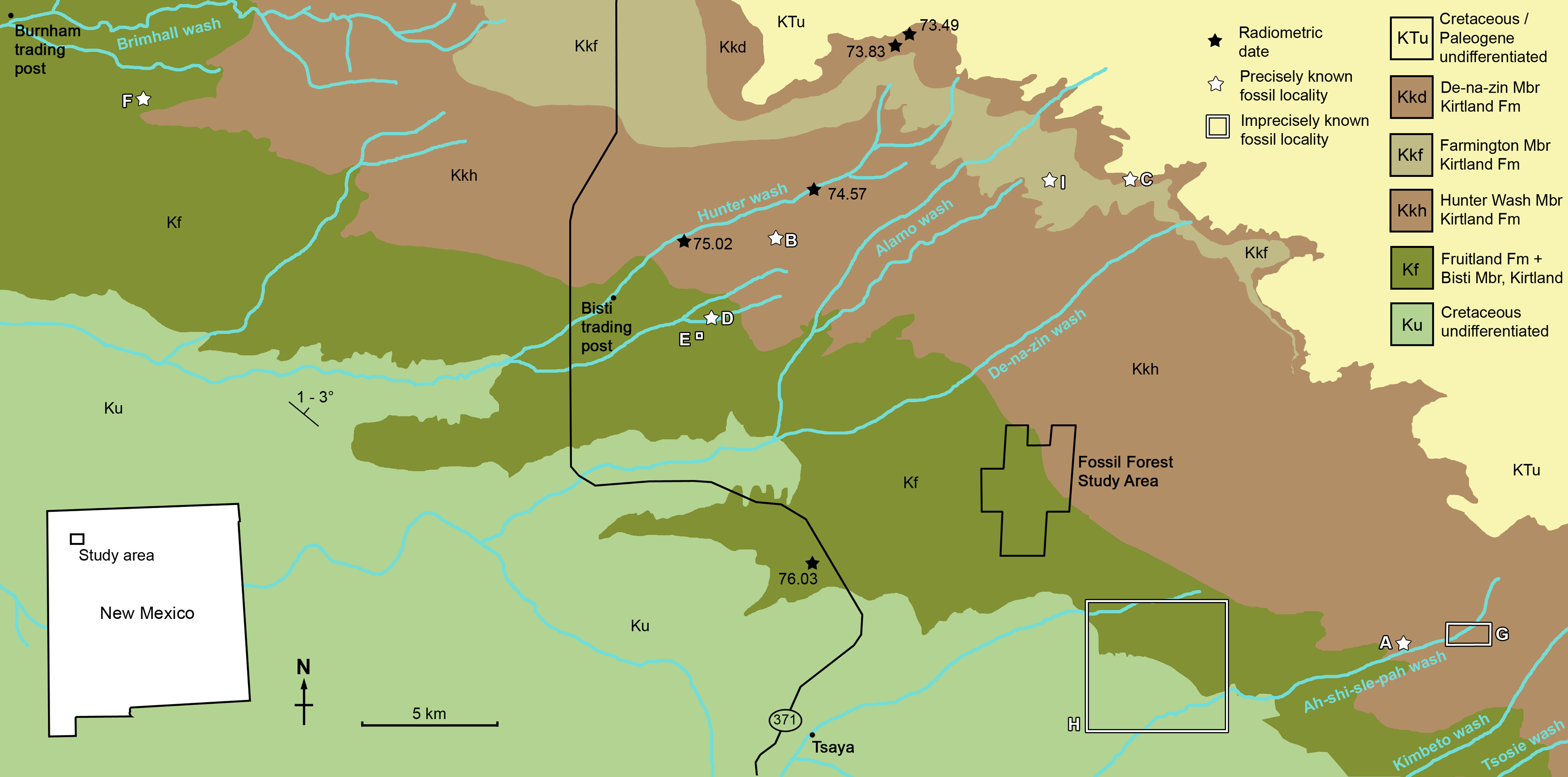
Geological map of the southeast San Juan Basin; A (lower right) is where the holotype was found

The holotype specimen, SMP VP-1500, collected in 2002, consists of a partial skull. It was discovered in the Campanian Hunter Wash Member of the Kirtland Formation, New Mexico. It was informally named in 2016.

Navajoceratops was a member of the Chasmosaurinae. Alongside fellow chasmosaurine Terminocavus, also from the Kirtland Formation and described in the same paper, Navajoceratops was found to represent a stratigraphic and morphological intermediate between Pentaceratops and Anchiceratops. Navajoceratops was also found to be marginally less derived than Terminocavus.

- Chasmosaurinae
  - - Chasmosaurus
    - - Vagaceratops
      - Kosmoceratops
  - - - Coahuilaceratops
      - - Pentaceratops
        - Utahceratops
    - - Navajoceratops
      - - Terminocavus
        - - Anchiceratops
          - - Arrhinoceratops
            - Triceratopsini

== See also ==
- Timeline of ceratopsian research
