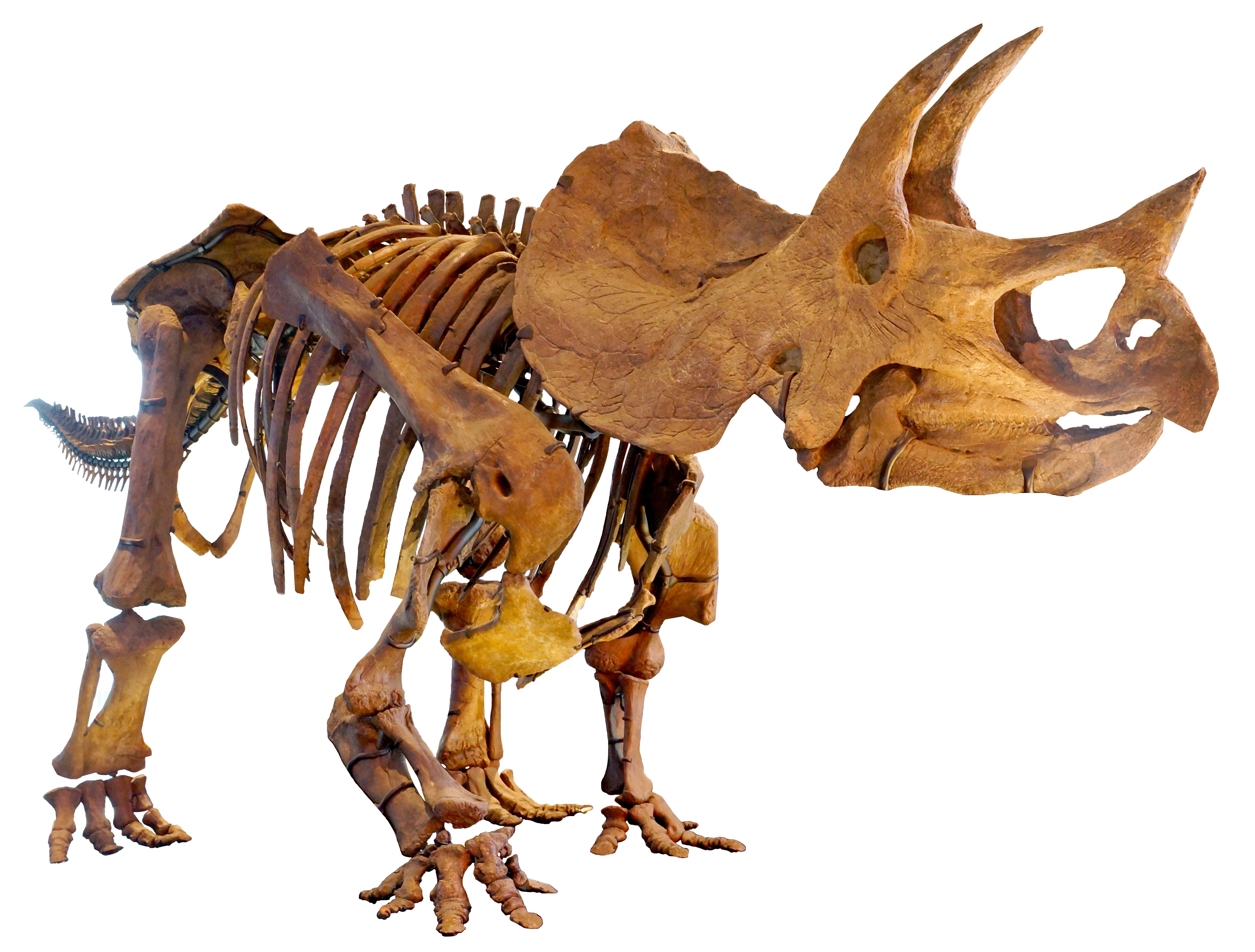
- Skeletal mount of a T. prorsus specimen at the Natural History Museum of Los Angeles

Scientific classification
- Kingdom: Animalia
- Phylum: Chordata
- Class: Reptilia
- Clade: Dinosauria
- Clade: †Ornithischia
- Clade: †Ceratopsia
- Family: †Ceratopsidae
- Subfamily: †Chasmosaurinae
- Tribe: †Triceratopsini
- Genus: †Triceratops; Marsh, 1889b

Type species
- †Ceratops horridus (original combination) Marsh, 1889a

Species
- †T. horridus (Marsh, 1889a) Marsh 1889b; †T. prorsus Marsh, 1890

Synonyms
- List: Agathaumas? Cope, 1872; Polyonax? Cope, 1874; Bison alticornis Marsh, 1887; Ceratops horridus Marsh, 1889; Sterrholophus Marsh, 1891; Claorhynchus? Cope, 1892; Ugrosaurus Cobabe & Fastovsky, 1987; Eotriceratops? Wu et al., 2007; Nedoceratops? Ukrainsky, 2007; Ojoceratops? Sullivan & Lucas, 2010; Tatankaceratops? Ott & Larson, 2010

= Triceratops =

Triceratops Temporal range: Late Cretaceous 69–66 Ma

Genus of Late Cretaceous dinosaur

Triceratops (/traɪˈsɛrətɒps/ try-SERR-ə-tops; lit. 'three-horned face') is a genus of chasmosaurine ceratopsian dinosaur that lived during the late Maastrichtian age of the Late Cretaceous period, about 69 to 66 million years ago on the island continent of Laramidia, now forming western North America. It was one of the last-known non-avian dinosaurs and lived until the Cretaceous–Paleogene extinction event 66 million years ago. The name Triceratops, which means 'three-horned face', is derived from Ancient Greek trí- (τρί-), meaning 'three', kéras (κέρας), meaning 'horn', and ṓps (ὤψ), meaning 'face'.

Bearing a large bony frill, three horns on the skull, and a large, four-legged body, exhibiting convergent evolution with rhinoceroses, Triceratops is one of the most recognizable of all dinosaurs and the best-known ceratopsian. It was also one of the largest, measuring around 8–9 m (26–30 ft) long and weighing up to 6–10 t (5.9–9.8 long tons; 6.6–11.0 short tons). It shared the landscape with and was most likely preyed upon by Tyrannosaurus rex. The functions of the frills and three distinctive facial horns on its head have inspired countless debates. Traditionally, these have been viewed as defensive weapons against predators. More recent interpretations find it probable that these features were primarily used in species identification, courtship, and dominance display.

Triceratops was traditionally placed within the "short-frilled" ceratopsids, but modern cladistic studies show it to be a member of Chasmosaurinae, which usually have long frills. Two species, T. horridus and T. prorsus, are considered valid today. Seventeen different species, however, have been named throughout history. Research published in 2010 argued that the contemporaneous Torosaurus, a ceratopsid long regarded as a separate genus, represents Triceratops in its mature form. This view has been highly disputed, with some morphometric research and the apparent existence of authentic Torosaurus subadults favoring the distinctness of the two genera, according to newer studies.

Triceratops has been documented by numerous remains collected since the genus was first described in 1889 by American paleontologist Othniel Charles Marsh. Specimens representing life stages from hatchling to adult have been found. As the archetypal ceratopsian, Triceratops has been featured in numerous films, postage stamps, and many other media types.

== Discovery and identification ==
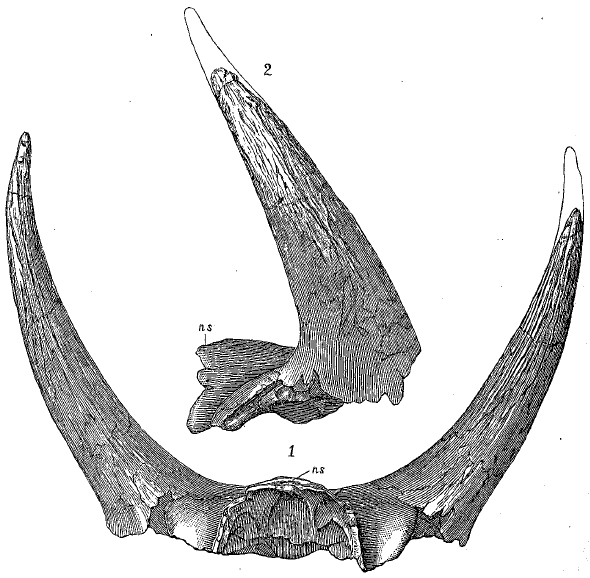
Illustration of specimen USNM 4739, the horn cores that were erroneously attributed to Bison alticornis, the first named specimen of Triceratops

The first named fossil specimen now attributed to Triceratops is a pair of brow horns attached to a skull roof that were found by George Lyman Cannon near Denver, Colorado, in the spring of 1887. This specimen was sent to Othniel Charles Marsh, who believed that the formation from which it came dated from the Pliocene and that the bones belonged to a particularly large and unusual bison, which he named Bison alticornis. He realized that there were horned dinosaurs by the next year, which saw his publication of the genus Ceratops from fragmentary remains.

Although not confidently assignable, fossils possibly belonging to Triceratops were described as two taxa, Agathaumas sylvestris and Polyonax mortuarius, in 1872 and 1874, respectively, by Marsh's archrival Edward Drinker Cope. Agathaumas was named based on a pelvis, several vertebrae, and a few ribs collected by Fielding Bradford Meek and Henry Martyn Bannister near the Green River of southwestern Wyoming from layers coming from the Maastrichtian Lance Formation. Due to the fragmentary nature of the remains, it can only confidently be assigned to Ceratopsidae. Polyonax mortuarius was collected by Cope himself in 1873 from northeastern Colorado, possibly coming from the Maastrichtian Denver Formation. The fossils only consisted of fragmentary horn cores, 3 dorsal vertebrae, and fragmentary limb elements. Polyonax has the same issue as Agathaumas, with the fragmentary remains non-assignable beyond Ceratopsidae.

The Triceratops holotype, YPM 1820, was collected in 1888 from the Lance Formation of Wyoming by fossil hunter John Bell Hatcher, but Marsh initially described this specimen as another species of Ceratops. Cowboy Edmund B. Wilson had been startled by the sight of a monstrous skull poking out of the side of a ravine. He tried to recover it by throwing a lasso around one of the horns. When it broke off, the skull tumbling to the bottom of the cleft, Wilson brought the horn to his boss. His boss was rancher and avid fossil collector Charles Arthur Guernsey, who just so happened to show it to Hatcher. Marsh subsequently ordered Hatcher to locate and salvage the skull. The holotype was first named Ceratops horridus. When further preparation uncovered the third nose horn, Marsh changed his mind and gave the piece the new generic name Triceratops (lit. 'three horn face'), accepting his Bison alticornis as another species of Ceratops. It would, however, later be added to Triceratops.

=== Species ===
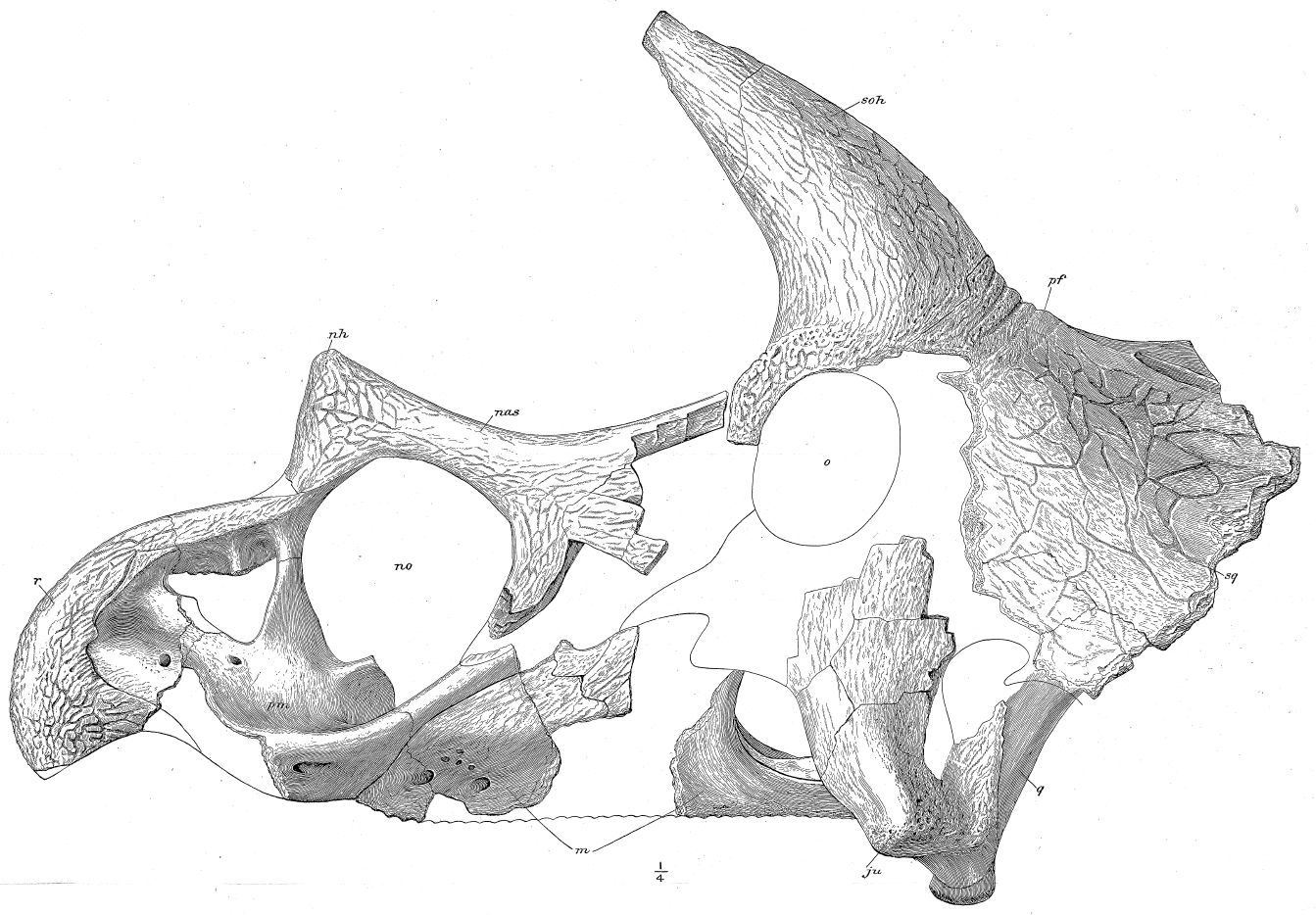
Type specimen YPM 1820 of the type species, T. horridus

After Triceratops was described, between 1889 and 1891, Hatcher collected another thirty-one of its skulls with great effort. The first species had been named T. horridus by Marsh. Its specific name was derived from the Latin word horridus meaning "rough" or "rugose", perhaps referring to the type specimen's rough texture, later identified as an aged individual. The additional skulls varied to a lesser or greater degree from the original holotype. This variation is unsurprising, given that Triceratops skulls are large three-dimensional objects from individuals of different ages and both sexes that which were subjected to different amounts and directions of pressure during fossilization.

In the first attempt to understand the many species, Richard Swann Lull found two groups, although he did not say how he distinguished them. One group composed of T. horridus, T. prorsus, and T. brevicornus ('the short-horned'). The other composed of T. elatus and T. calicornis. Two species (T. serratus and T. flabellatus) stood apart from these groups. By 1933, alongside his revision of the landmark 1907 Hatcher–Marsh–Lull monograph of all known ceratopsians, he retained his two groups and two unaffiliated species, with a third lineage of T. obtusus and T. hatcheri ('Hatcher's') that was characterized by a very small nasal horn. T. horridus–T. prorsus–T. brevicornus was now thought to be the most conservative lineage, with an increase in skull size and a decrease in nasal horn size. T. elatus–T. calicornis was defined by having large brow horns and small nasal horns. Charles Mortram Sternberg made one modification by adding T. eurycephalus ('the wide-headed') and suggesting that it linked the second and third lineages closer together than they were to the T. horridus lineage.

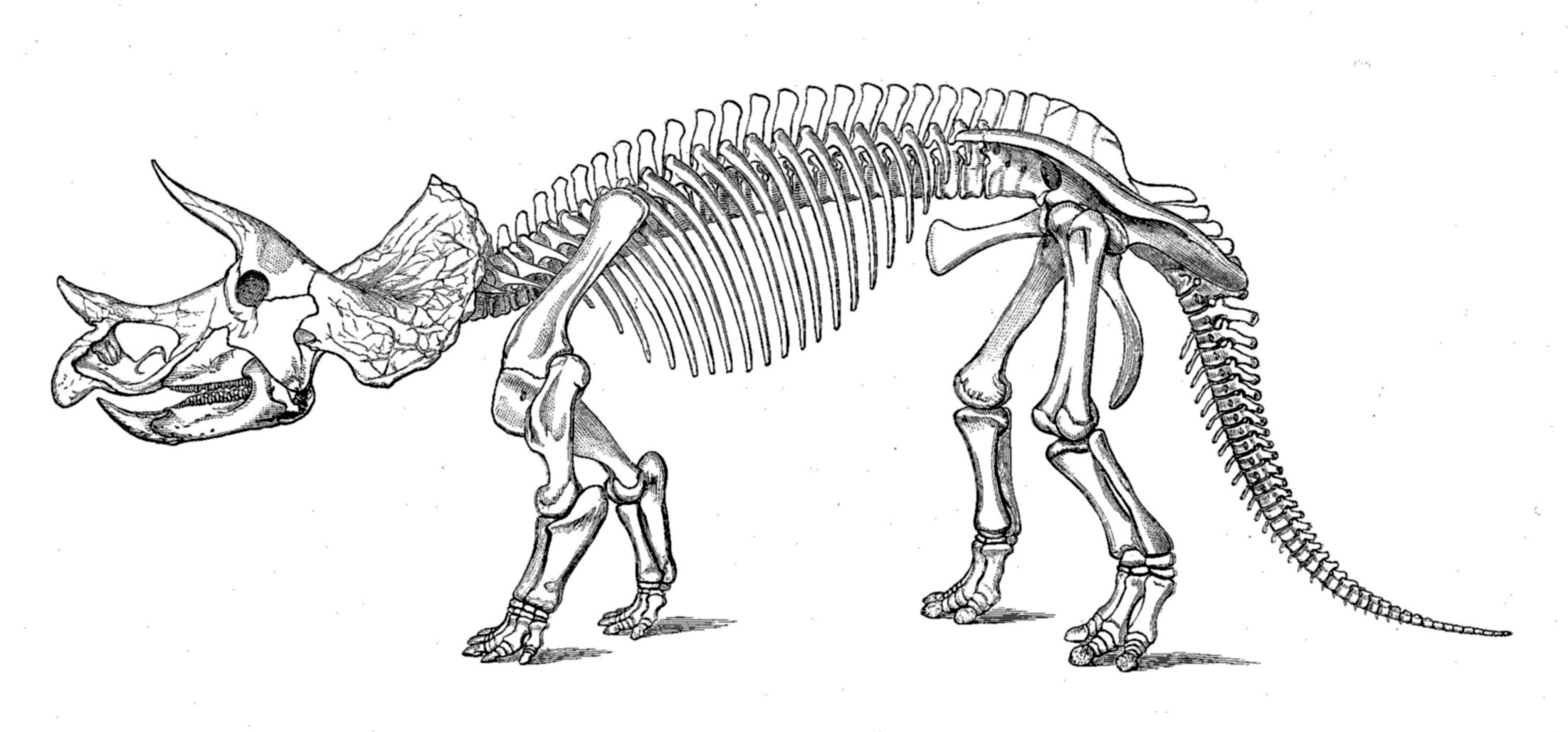
1896 skeletal restoration of T. prorsus by O. C. Marsh, based on the holotype skull YPM 1822 and referred elements

With time, the idea that the differing skulls might be representative of individual variation within one (or two) species gained popularity. In 1986, John Ostrom and Peter Wellnhofer published a paper in which they proposed that there was only one species, Triceratops horridus. Part of their rationale was that there are generally only one or two species of any large animal in a region. To their findings, Thomas Lehman added the old Lull–Sternberg lineages combined with maturity and sexual dimorphism, suggesting that the T. horridus–T. prorsus–T. brevicornus lineage was composed of females, the T. calicornis–T. elatus lineage was made up of males, and the T. obtusus–T. hatcheri lineage was of pathologic old males.

These findings were contested a few years later by paleontologist Catherine Forster, who reanalyzed Triceratops material more comprehensively and concluded that the remains fell into two species, T. horridus and T. prorsus, although the distinctive skull of T. ("Nedoceratops") hatcheri differed enough to warrant a separate genus. She found that T. horridus and several other species belonged together and that T. prorsus and T. brevicornus stood alone. Since there were many more specimens in the first group, she suggested that this meant the two groups were two species. It is still possible to interpret the differences as representing a single species with sexual dimorphism.

In 2014, John Scannella and colleagues supported the separation of T. prorsus and T. horridus, noting that the two species are also separated stratigraphically within the Hell Creek Formation, indicating that they did not live together at the same time.

==== Valid species ====
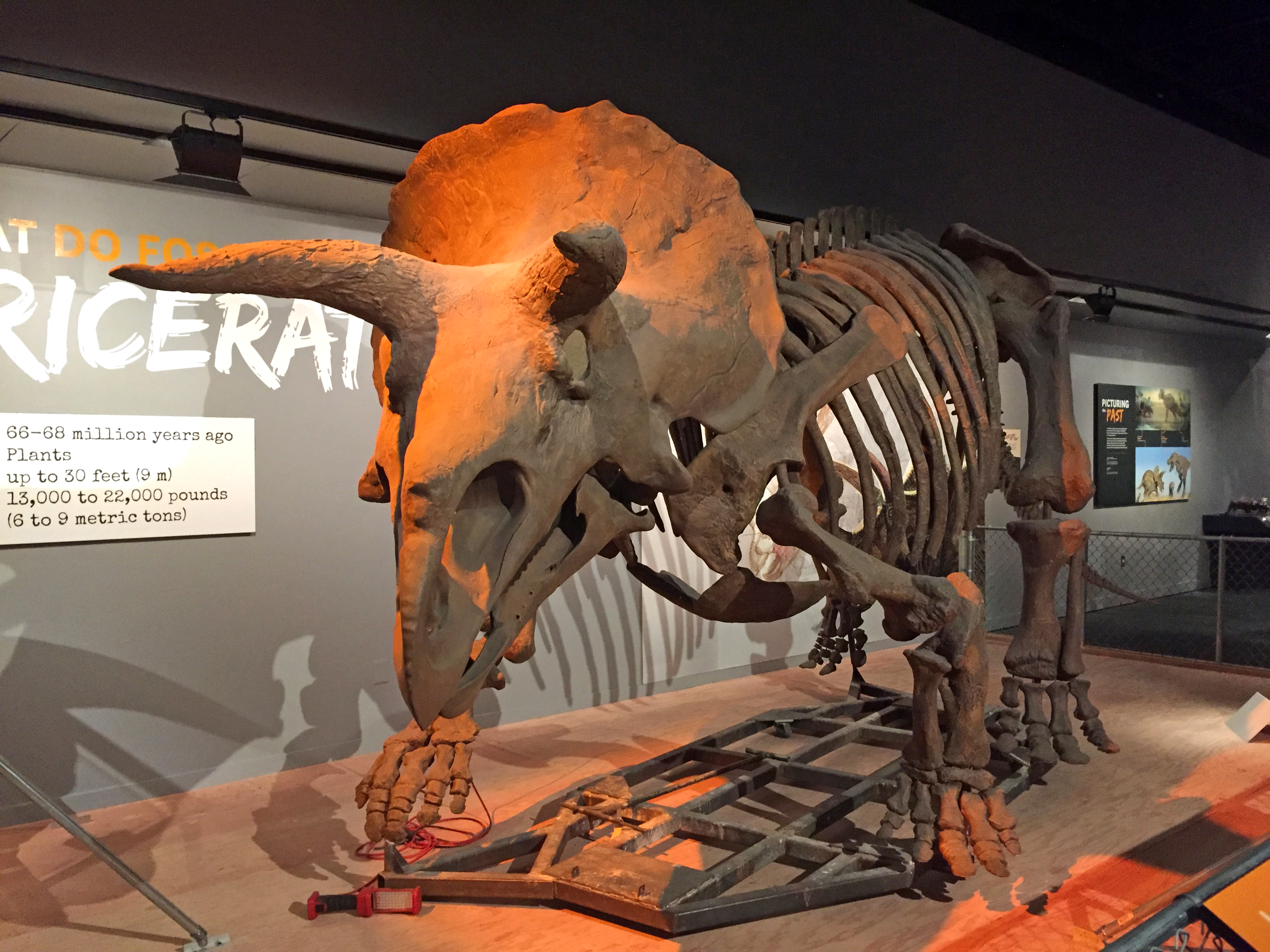
Cast of the first mounted T. horridus skeleton (composite of several specimens, including USNM 2100 and 4842), nicknamed "Hatcher", National Museum of Natural History

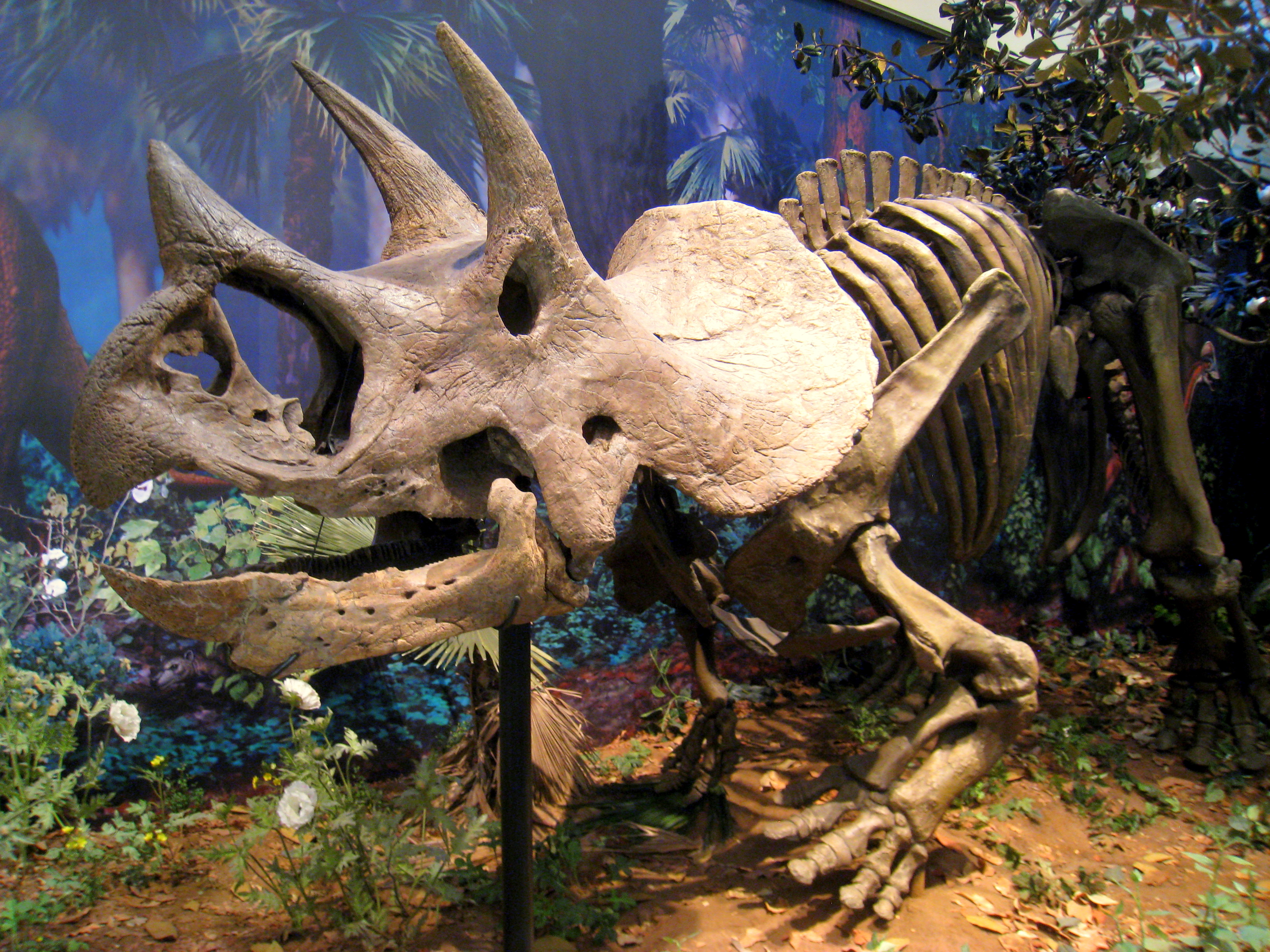
T. prorsus, Carnegie Museum of Natural History

- T. horridus (Marsh, 1889) Marsh, 1889 (originally Ceratops) (type species)
- T. prorsus Marsh, 1890

==== Synonyms and doubtful species ====
Some of the following species are synonyms, as indicated in parentheses ("=T. horridus" or "=T. prorsus"). All the others are each considered a nomen dubium (lit. 'dubious name') because they are based on remains too poor or incomplete to be distinguished from pre-existing Triceratops species.

- T. albertensis C. M. Sternberg, 1949
- T. alticornis (Marsh 1887) Hatcher, Marsh, and Lull, 1907 [originally Bison alticornis, Marsh 1887, and Ceratops alticornis, Marsh 1888]
- T. brevicornus Hatcher, 1905 (=T. prorsus)
- T. calicornis Marsh, 1898 (=T. horridus)
- T. elatus Marsh, 1891 (=T. horridus)
- T. eurycephalus Schlaikjer, 1935
- T. flabellatus Marsh, 1889 (= Sterrholophus Marsh, 1891) (=T. horridus)
- T. galeus Marsh, 1889
- T. hatcheri (Hatcher & Lull 1905) Lull, 1933 (contentious; see Nedoceratops below)
- T. ingens Marsh vide Lull, 1915
- T. maximus Brown, 1933
- T. mortuarius (Cope, 1874) Kuhn, 1936 (nomen dubium; originally Polyonax mortuarius)
- T. obtusus Marsh, 1898 (=T. horridus)
- T. serratus Marsh, 1890 (=T. horridus)
- T. sulcatus Marsh, 1890
- T. sylvestris (Cope, 1872) Kuhn, 1936 (nomen dubium; originally Agathaumas sylvestris)

== Description ==
=== Size ===
Size comparison with T. horridus in blue and T. prorsus in red

Triceratops was a very large animal, measuring around 8–9 m (26–30 ft) in length and weighing up to 6–10 metric tons (6.6–11.0 short tons). A specimen of T. horridus named Kelsey measured 6.7–7.3 meters (22–24 ft) long, has a 2-meter (6.5 ft) skull, stood about 2.3 meters (7.5 ft) tall, and was estimated by the Black Hills Institute to weigh approximately 5.4 metric tons (6.0 short tons). A T. horridus specimen named Big John was estimated to have been 8.0 meters (26.1 ft) long and 3.0 meters (10 ft) tall.

=== Skull ===
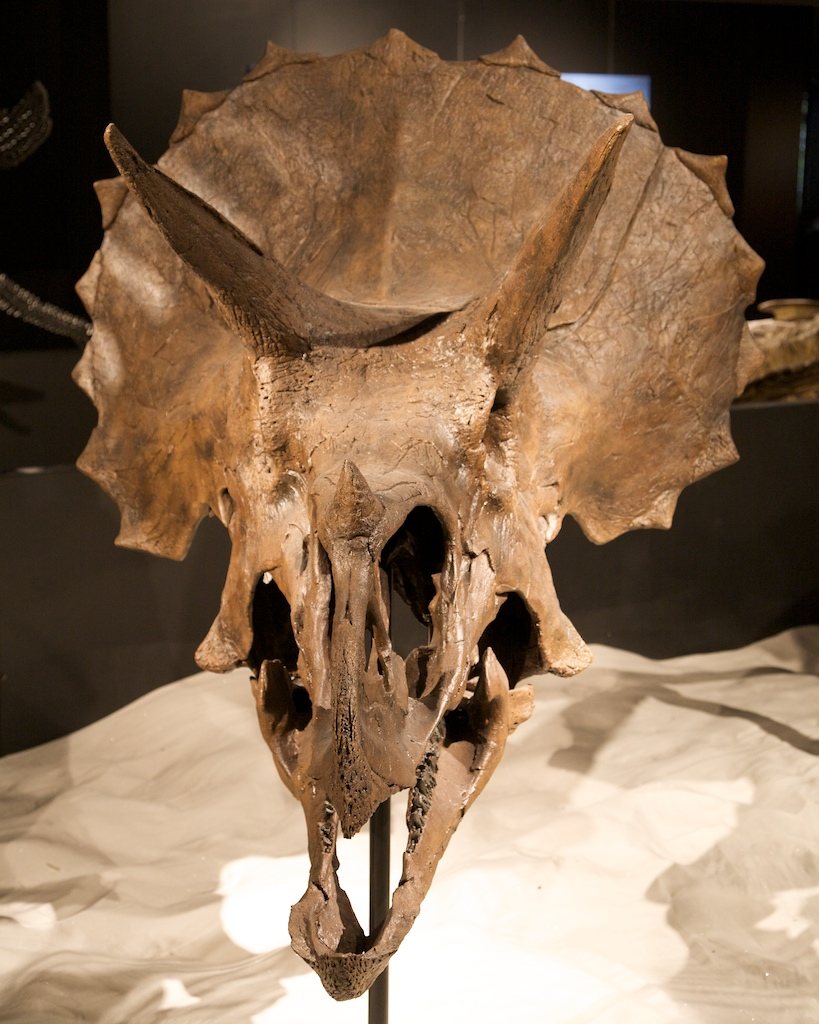
Front view of skull with a prominent epoccipital fringe, Houston Museum of Natural Science

Like all chasmosaurines, Triceratops had a large skull relative to its body size, among the largest of all land animals. The largest-known skull, specimen MWC 7584 (formerly BYU 12183), is estimated to have been 2.5 meters (8.2 ft) in length when complete and could reach almost a third of the length of the entire animal.

The front of the head was equipped with a large beak in front of its teeth. The core of the top beak was formed by a special rostral bone. Behind it, the premaxillae bones were located, embayed from behind by very large, circular nostrils. In chasmosaurines, the premaxillae met on their midline in a complex bone plate, the rear edge of which was reinforced by the "narial strut". From the base of this strut, a triangular process jutted out into the nostril. Triceratops differs from most relatives in that this process was hollowed out on the outer side. Behind the toothless premaxilla, the maxilla bore thirty-six to forty tooth positions, in which three to five teeth per position were vertically stacked. The teeth were closely appressed, forming a "dental battery" curving to the inside. The skull bore a single horn on the snout above the nostrils. In Triceratops, the nose horn is sometimes recognisable as a separate ossification, the epinasal.

The skull also featured a pair of supraorbital "brow" horns approximately 1 meter (3.3 ft) long, with one above each eye. The jugal bones pointed downward at the rear sides of the skull and were capped by separate epijugals. With Triceratops, these were not particularly large and sometimes touched the quadratojugals. The bones of the skull roof were fused and by a folding of the frontal bones, a "double" skull roof was created. In Triceratops, some specimens show a fontanelle, an opening in the upper roof layer. The cavity between the layers invaded the bone cores of the brow horns.

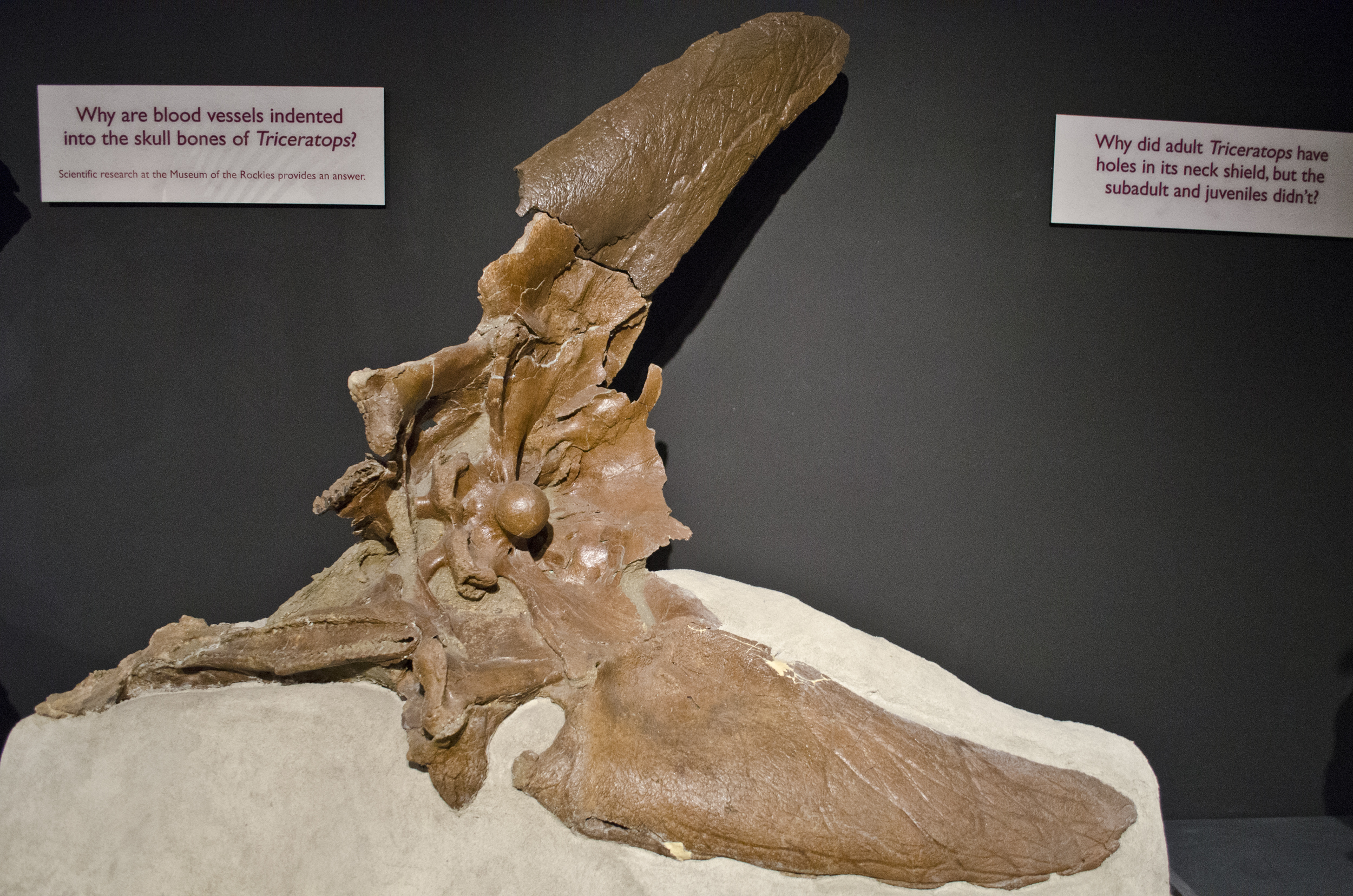
Back of skull, showing rounded joint which connected the head and neck

At the rear of the skull, the outer squamosal bones and the inner parietal bones grew into a relatively short, bony frill, adorned with epoccipitals in young specimens. These were low triangular processes on the frill edge, representing separate skin ossifications or osteoderms. Typically, with Triceratops specimens, there are two epoccipitals present on each parietal bone, with an additional central process on their border. Each squamosal bone had five processes. Most other ceratopsids had large parietal fenestrae, openings in their frills, but those of Triceratops were noticeably solid, unless the genus Torosaurus represents mature Triceratops individuals, which it most likely does not. Under the frill, at the rear of the skull, a huge occipital condyle, up to 106 millimeters (4.2 in) in diameter, connected the head to the neck.

The lower jaws were elongated and met at their tips in a shared epidentary bone, the core of the toothless lower beak. In the dentary bone, the tooth battery curved to the outside to meet the battery of the upper jaw. At the rear of the lower jaw, the articular bone was exceptionally wide, matching the general width of the jaw joint. T. horridus can be distinguished from T. prorsus by having a shallower snout.

=== Postcranial skeleton ===
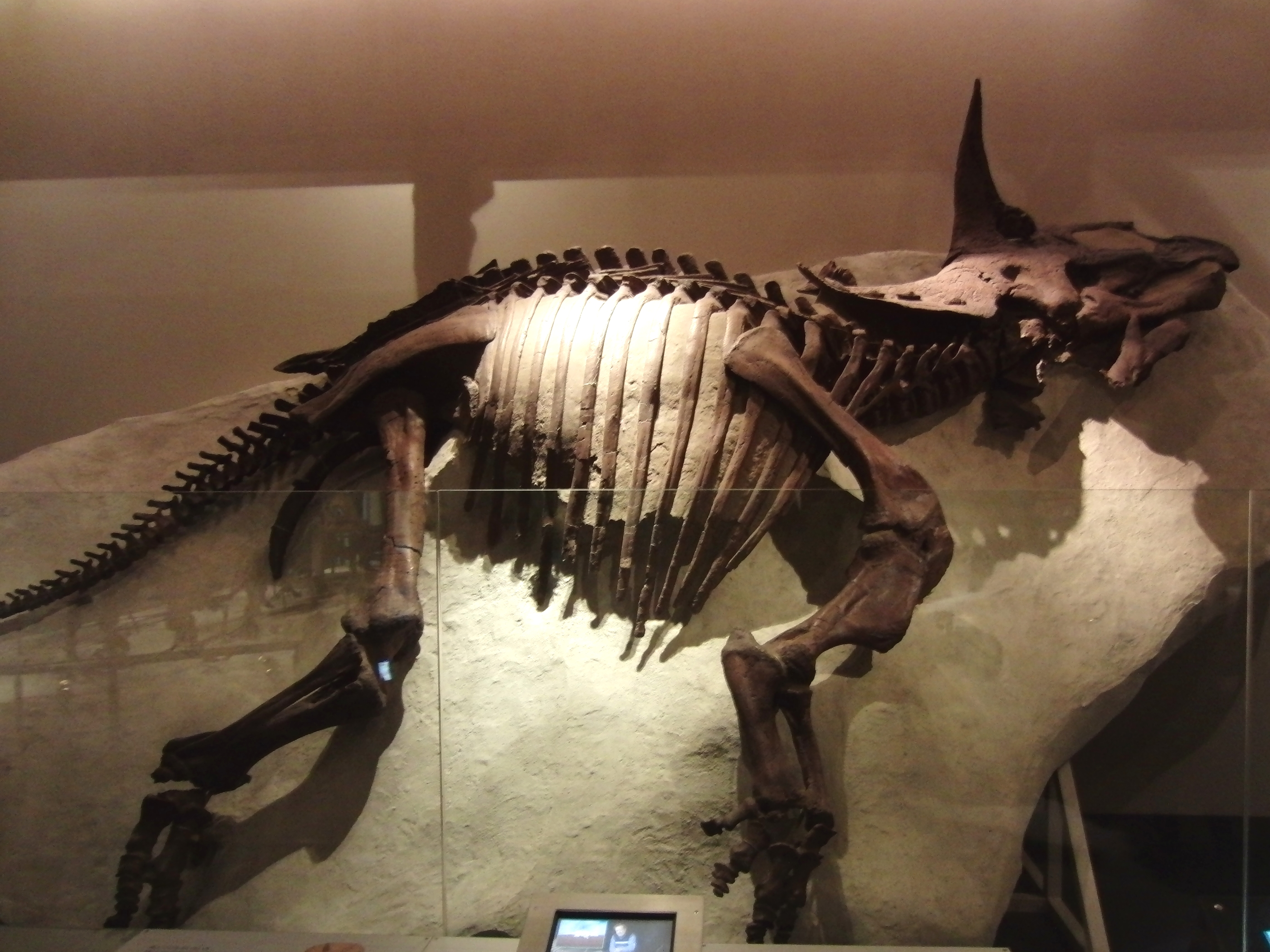
Specimen nicknamed "Raymond" that preserves the natural, non-pronated pose of the forelimb

Chasmosaurines showed little variation in their postcranial skeleton. The skeleton of Triceratops is markedly robust. Both Triceratops species possessed a very sturdy build, with strong limbs, short hands with three hooves each, and short feet with four hooves each. The vertebral column consisted of ten neck, twelve back, ten sacral, and about forty-five tail vertebrae. The front neck vertebrae were fused into a syncervical. Traditionally, this was assumed to have incorporated the first three vertebrae, thus implying that the frontmost atlas was very large and sported a spinous process (the spike-like piece of bone that extends dorsally which combined have a ridge or keel-like appearance). Later interpretations revived an old hypothesis by John Bell Hatcher that, at the very front, a vestige of the real atlas can be observed, the syncervical then consisting of four vertebrae. The vertebral count mentioned is adjusted to this view. In Triceratops, the spinous processes of the neck are constant in height and don't gradually slope upwards. Another peculiarity is that the neck ribs only begin to lengthen with the ninth cervical vertebra.

The rather short and high vertebrae of the back were, in its middle region, reinforced by ossified tendons running along the tops of the vertebral arches (the band of bone that encloses the spinal canal). The straight sacrum (the part of the spine at the pelvis) was long and adult individuals show a fusion of all sacral vertebrae. In Triceratops the first four and last two sacrals had transverse processes (sideways outgrowths), connecting the vertebral column to the pelvis, that were fused at their distal ends. Sacrals seven and eight had longer processes, causing the sacrum to have an oval profile in top view. On top of the sacrum, a carapace-like bone plate was formed by a fusion of the spinous processes of the second through fifth vertebrae. Triceratops had a large pelvis with a long ilium. The ischium was curved downwards.

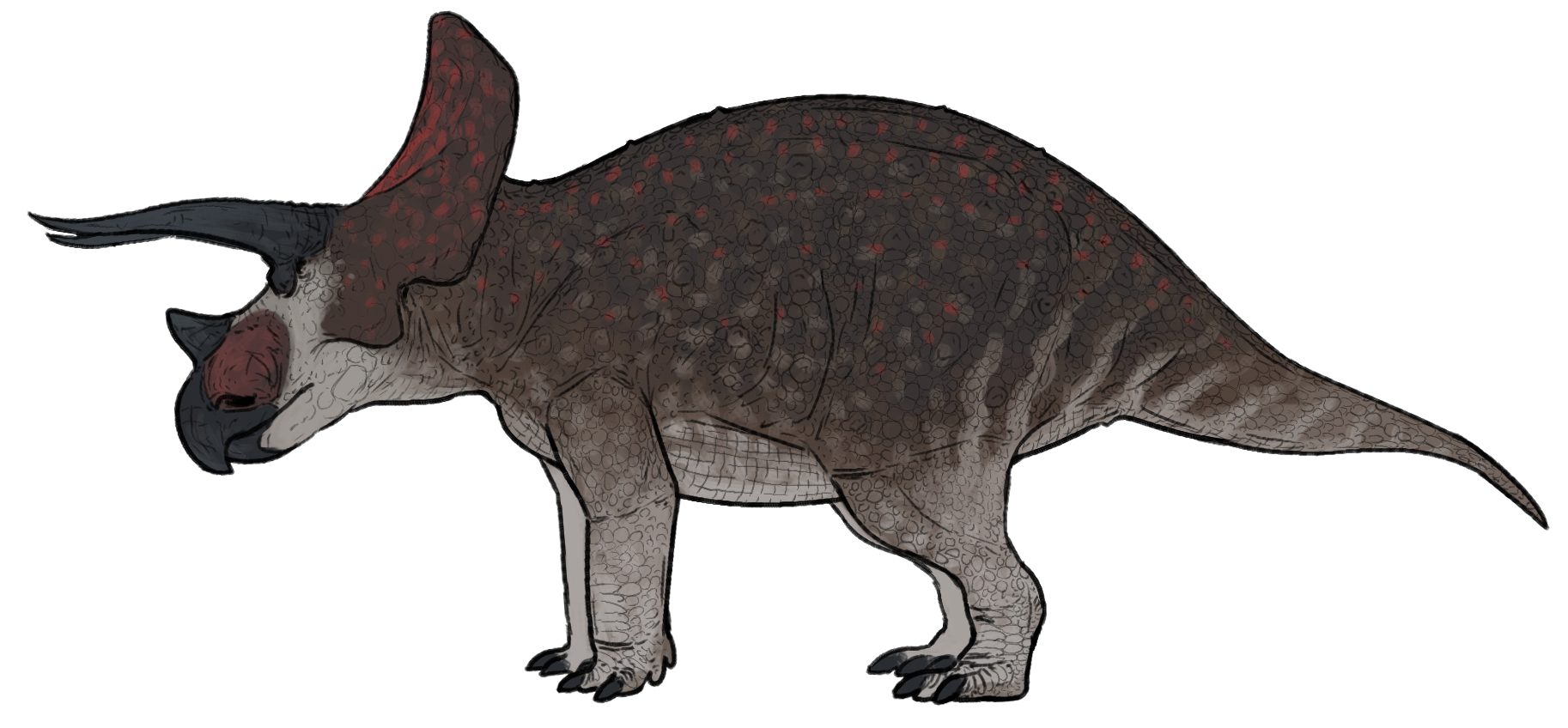
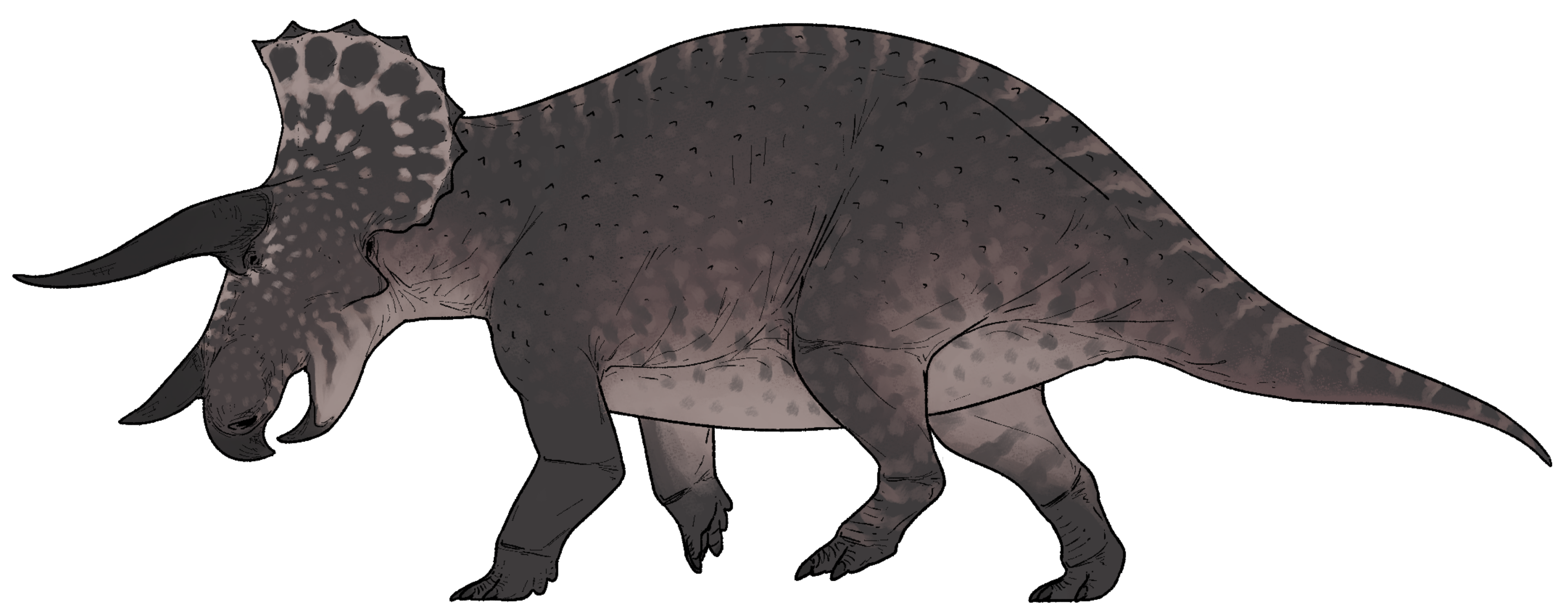
Life restorations of T. horridus (top) and T. prorsus (bottom)

Although certainly quadrupedal, the posture of horned dinosaurs has long been the subject of some debate. Originally, it was believed that the front legs of the animal had to be sprawling at a considerable angle from the thorax in order to better bear the weight of the head. This stance can be seen in paintings by Charles Knight and Rudolph Zallinger. Ichnological evidence in the form of trackways from horned dinosaurs and recent reconstructions of skeletons (both physical and digital) seem to show that Triceratops and other ceratopsids maintained an upright stance during normal locomotion, with the elbows flexed to behind and slightly bowed out, in an intermediate state between fully upright and fully sprawling, comparable to the modern rhinoceros. Tracks of a large ceratopsian from the Upper Cretaceous Laramie Formation of Colorado given the name Ceratopsipes goldenensis may have been made by Triceratops (or the closely related Torosaurus).

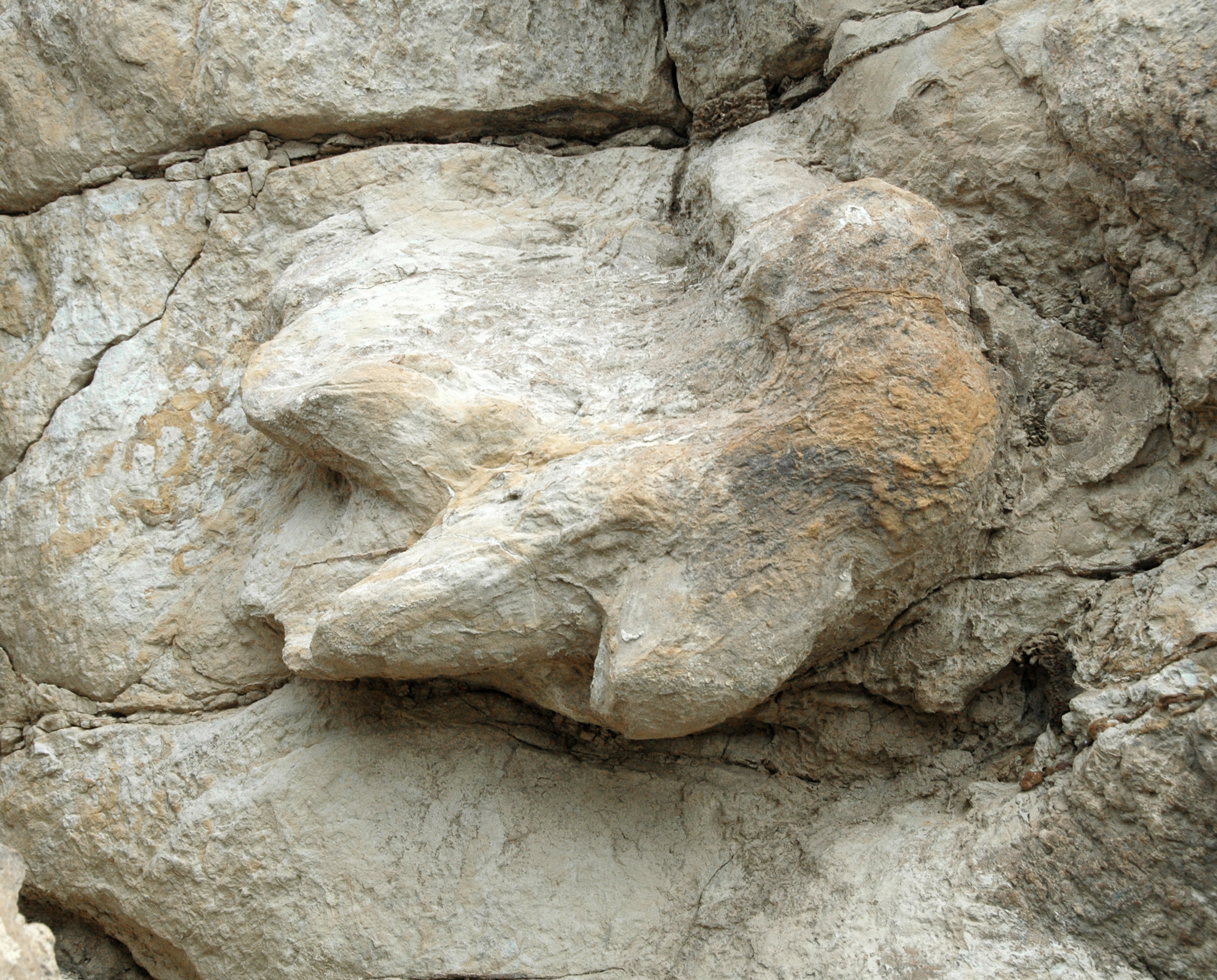
Ceratopsipes goldenensis, possible Triceratops track

The hands and forearms of Triceratops retained a fairly primitive structure when compared to other quadrupedal dinosaurs, such as thyreophorans and many sauropods. In those two groups, the forelimbs of quadrupedal species were usually rotated so that the hands faced forward with palms backward ("pronated") as the animals walked. Triceratops, like other ceratopsians and related quadrupedal ornithopods (together forming the Cerapoda), walked with most of their fingers pointing out and away from the body, the original condition for dinosaurs. This was also retained by bipedal forms, like theropods. In Triceratops, the weight of the body was carried by only the first three fingers of the hand, while digits 4 and 5 were vestigial and lacked claws or hooves. The phalangeal formula of the hand is 2-3-4-3-1, meaning that the first or innermost finger of the forelimb has two bones, the next has three, the next has four, etc.

=== Skin ===
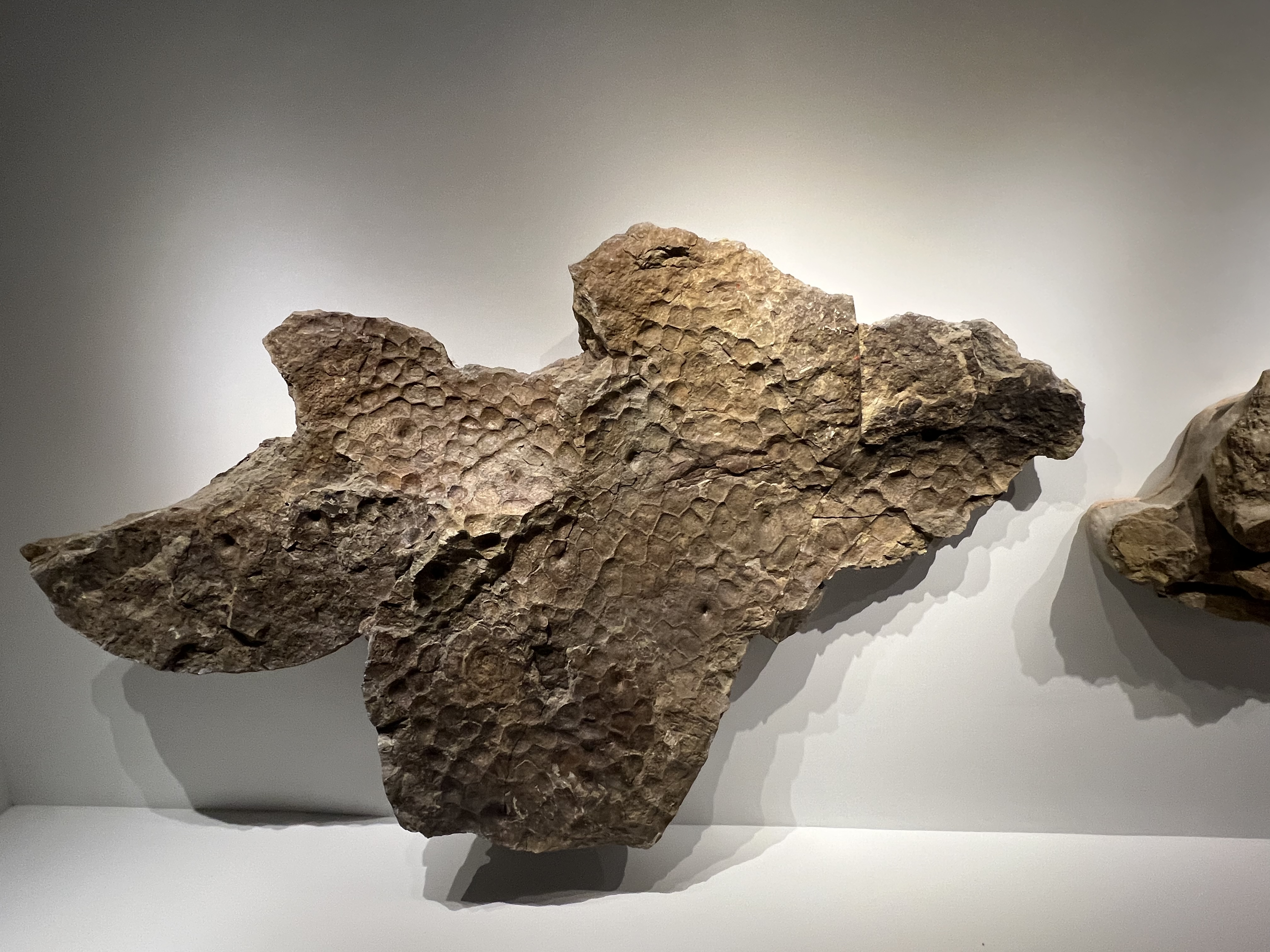
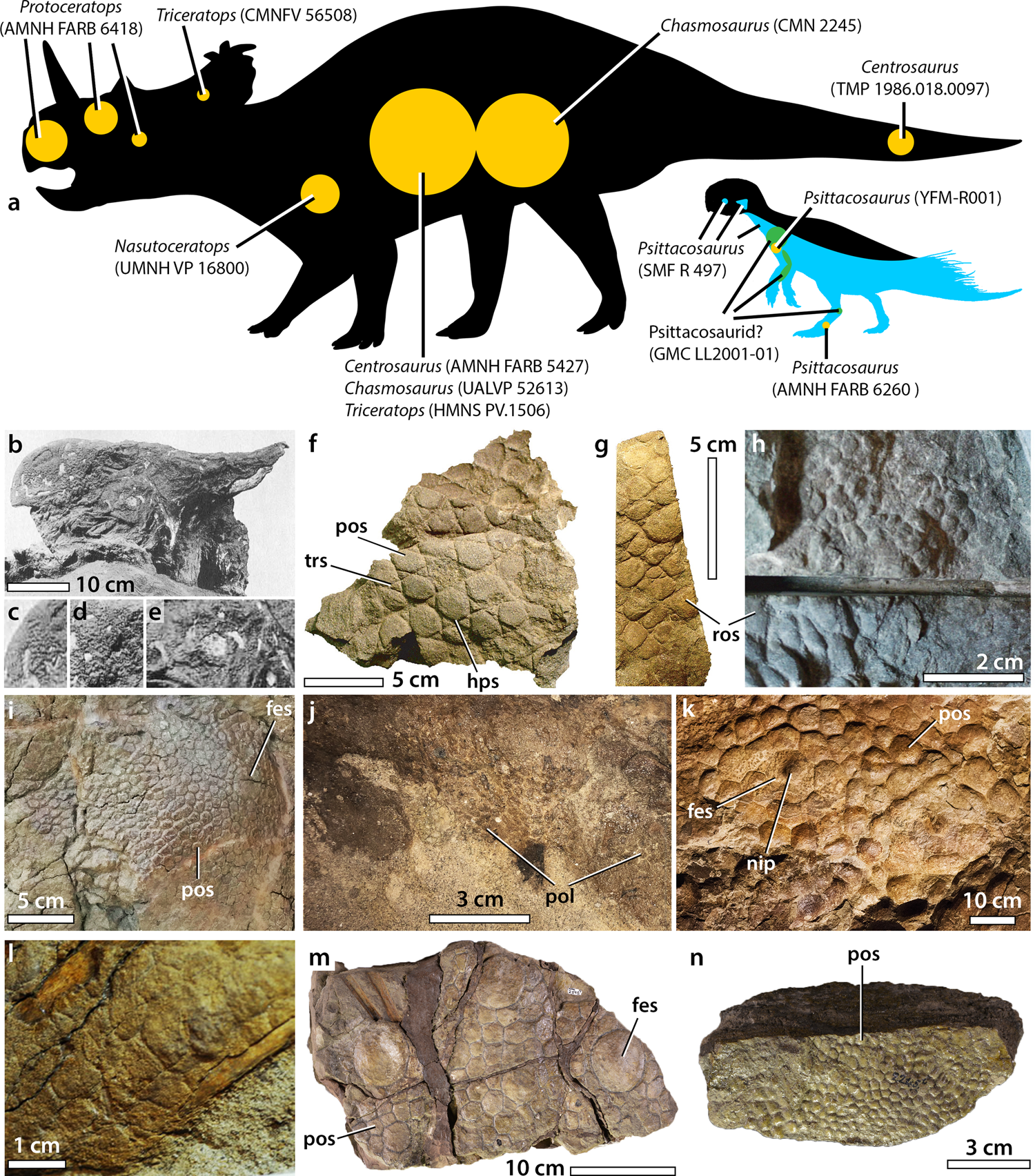
Fossils of skin from Triceratops and other ceratopsians
- top: Triceratops fossil skin at the Houston Museum of Natural Science
- bottom: Fossil skin of various ceratopsians (k. is Triceratops)

A Triceratops nicknamed "Lane" (HMNS PV.1506) that was unearthed on the Zerbst Ranch in Wyoming in 2002 is preserved with large areas of fossil skin over its trunk−both the nearly complete skeleton and the skin fossil are on display at the Houston Museum of Natural Science. The skin is not preserved as an impression but as a thin layer of clay that formed from a bacterial mat on the desiccated body and recorded the skin in positive relief with exceptional detail, a form of fossilization called "clay templating" that was only recognized recently based on analysis of two Edmontosaurus "mummy" specimens first described in 2025 from the same Wyoming area, dubbed the "mummy zone." Contrary to earlier sources, actual fossilized skin is not preserved. The basement scales covering the majority of the body are large in size, the largest known in ceratopsians at up to 9 centimetres (3.5 in) across. Regularly scattered (approximately 15–20 centimetres (5.9–7.9 in) from each other, though in no particular pattern) amongst the basement scales are large feature scales, exceeding 10 centimetres (3.9 in) across, which are hexagonal (six-sided) to heptagonal (seven-sided) in shape. These scales have conical nipple-like projections approximately 1–3 centimetres (0.39–1.18 in) tall rising from their center, with the outer edges of the feature scales being relatively flat. It has been suggested that it is unlikely that the nipple-like projections of the feature scales bore bristles like those known in other ceratopsians like Psittacosaurus. A preserved piece of skin from the frill of another specimen (CMN FV 56508) is also known, which consists of small polygonal basement scales.

== Classification ==
Triceratops is the best-known genus of Ceratopsidae, a family of large, mostly North American ceratopsians. The exact relationship of Triceratops among the other ceratopsids has been debated over the years. Confusion stemmed mainly from the combination of a short, solid frill (similar to that of Centrosaurinae), with long brow horns (more akin to Chasmosaurinae). In the first overview of ceratopsians, R. S. Lull hypothesized the existence of two lineages, one of Monoclonius and Centrosaurus leading to Triceratops, the other with Ceratops and Torosaurus, making Triceratops a centrosaurine as the group is understood today. Later revisions supported this view when Lawrence Lambe, in 1915, formally describing the first, short-frilled group as Centrosaurinae (including Triceratops), and the second, long-frilled group as Chasmosaurinae.

In 1949, Charles Mortram Sternberg was the first to question this position, proposing instead that Triceratops was more closely related to Arrhinoceratops and Chasmosaurus based on skull and horn features, making Triceratops a chasmosaurine ("ceratopsine" in his usage) genus. He was largely ignored, with John Ostrom and later David Norman placing Triceratops within the Centrosaurinae.

Subsequent discoveries and analyses, however, proved the correctness of Sternberg's view on the position of Triceratops, with Thomas Lehman defining both subfamilies in 1990 and diagnosing Triceratops as "ceratopsine" on the basis of several morphological features. Apart from the one feature of a shortened frill, Triceratops shares no derived traits with centrosaurines. Further research by Peter Dodson, including a 1990 cladistic analysis and a 1993 study using resistant-fit theta-rho analysis, or RFTRA (a morphometric technique which systematically measures similarities in skull shape), reinforces Triceratops' placement as a chasmosaurine.

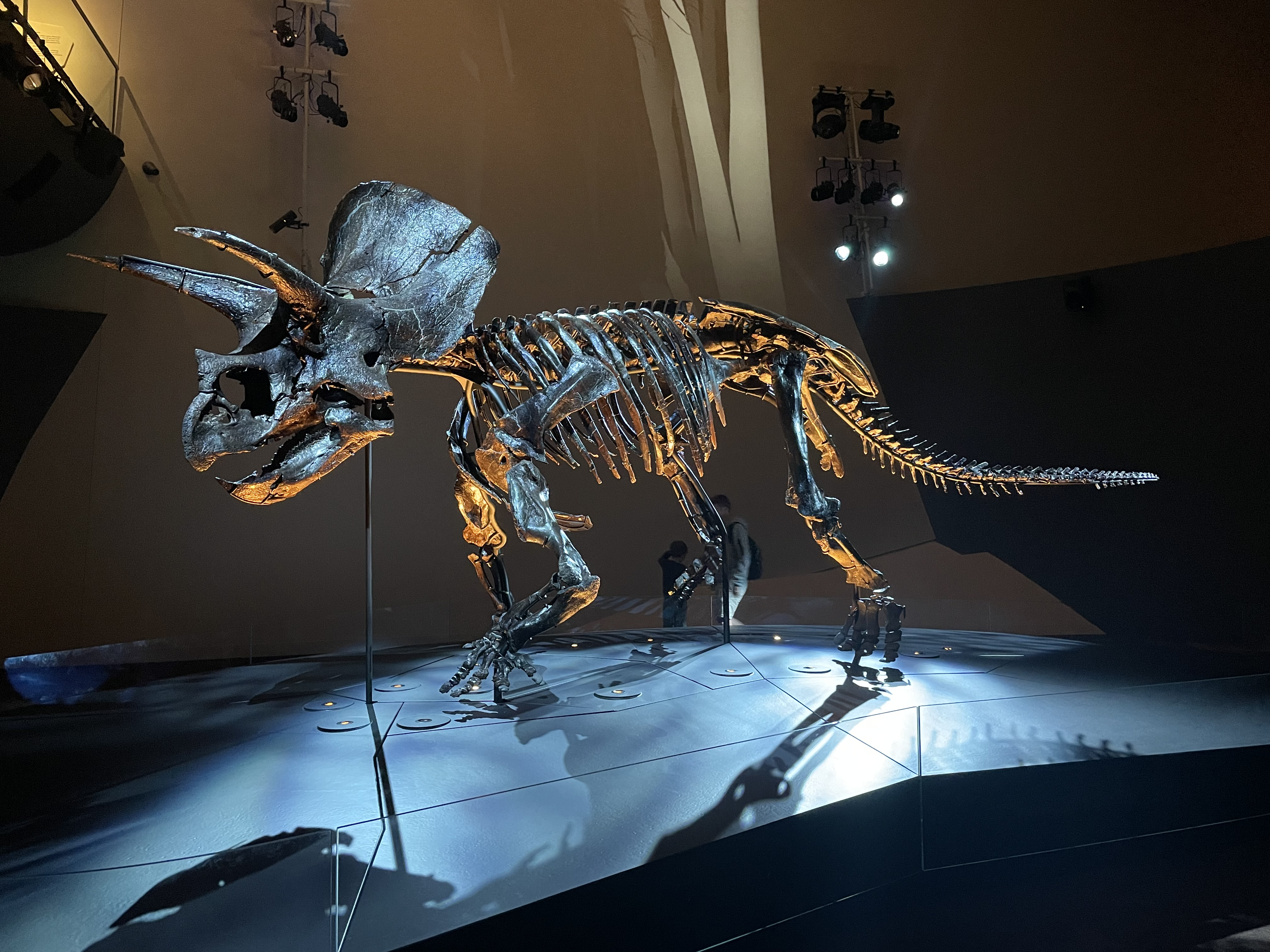
'Horridus', the most complete Triceratops fossil known, on display at the Melbourne Museum. Restored and prepared by the team at Pangea Fossils in Victoria British Columbia, Canada.

The cladogram below follows Longrich (2014), who named a new species of Pentaceratops, and included nearly all species of chasmosaurine.

- Chasmosaurinae
  - Mercuriceratops
  - - Judiceratops
    - - - Chasmosaurus
        - Mojoceratops
      - - Agujaceratops
        - - - Pentaceratops aquilonius
            - Williams Fork chasmosaur
            - - Pentaceratops sternbergii
              - Utahceratops
          - - Kosmoceratops
            - - - Anchiceratops
                - Almond Formation chasmosaur
              - - - Bravoceratops
                  - Coahuilaceratops
                - - Arrhinoceratops
                  - Triceratopsini
                    - Titanoceratops
                    - - Torosaurus
                      - Triceratops

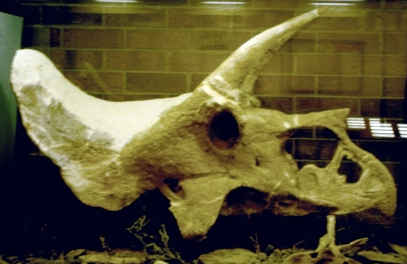
Skull of a specimen nicknamed 'Pops' from the Laramie Formation of eastern Colorado, on display at the Weld County Courthouse. Based on the age of the formation, it may be the oldest Triceratops known.

For many years after its discovery, the deeper evolutionary origins of Triceratops and its close relatives remained largely obscure. In 1922, the newly discovered Protoceratops was seen as its ancestor by Henry Fairfield Osborn, but many decades passed before additional findings came to light. Recent years have been fruitful for the discovery of several antecedents of Triceratops. Zuniceratops, the earliest-known ceratopsian with brow horns, was described in the late 1990s, and Yinlong, the first known Jurassic ceratopsian, was described in 2006.

These new finds have been vital in illustrating the origins of ceratopsians in general, suggesting an Asian origin in the Jurassic and the appearance of truly horned ceratopsians by the beginning of the Late Cretaceous in North America.

In phylogenetic taxonomy, the genus Triceratops has been used as a reference point in the definition of Dinosauria. Dinosaurs have been designated as all descendants of the most recent common ancestor of Triceratops and modern birds. Furthermore, Ornithischia has been defined as those dinosaurs more closely related to Triceratops than to modern birds.

== Paleobiology ==
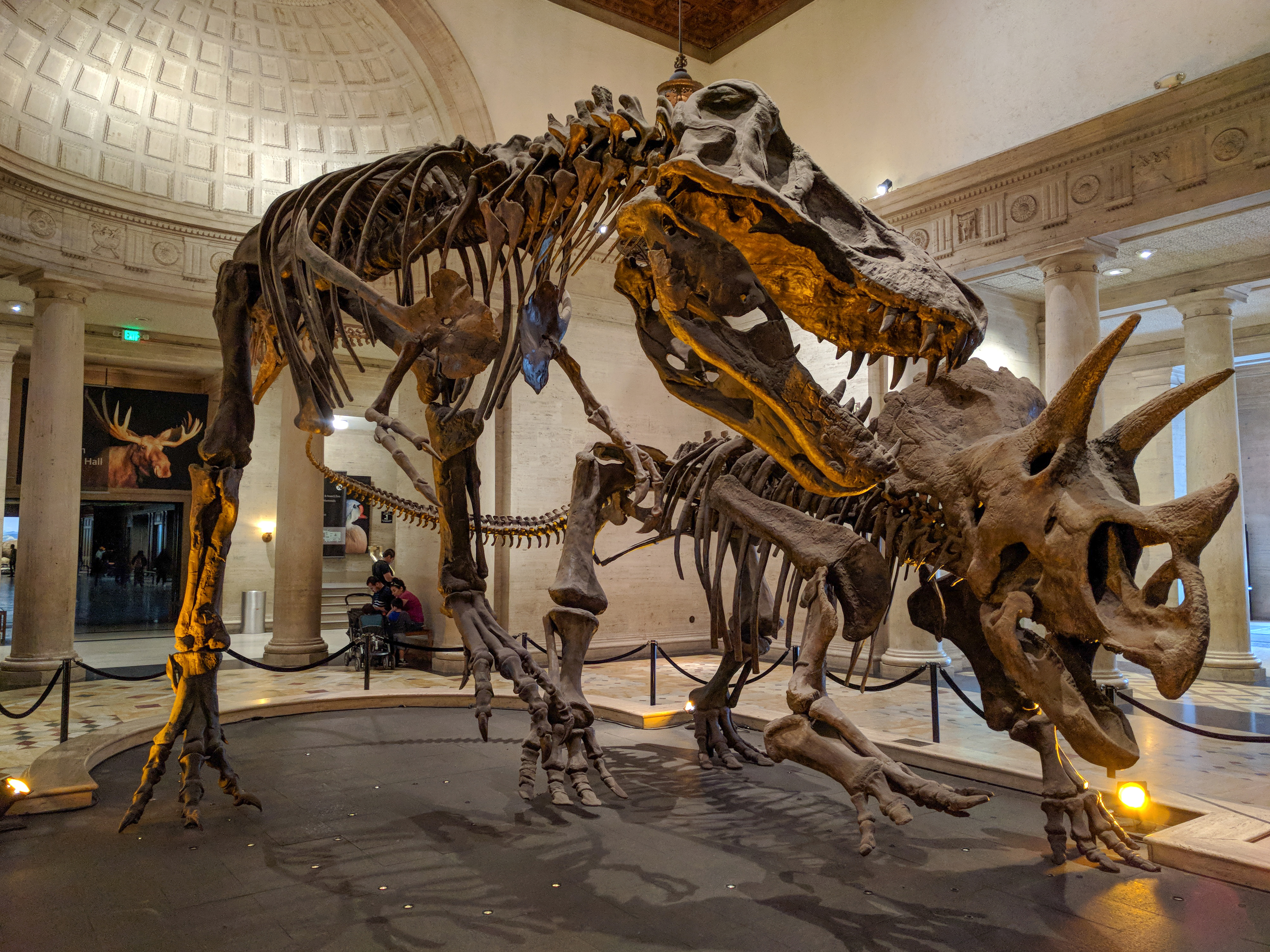
A Triceratops mounted next to a Tyrannosaurus at the Los Angeles Natural History Museum

Although Triceratops is commonly portrayed as a herding animal, there is currently little evidence to suggest that they lived in herds. While several other ceratopsians are known from bone beds preserving bones from two to hundreds or even thousands of individuals, there is currently only one documented bonebed dominated by Triceratops bones: a site in southeastern Montana with the remains of three juveniles. It may be significant that only juveniles were present. In 2012, a group of three Triceratops in relatively complete condition, each of varying sizes from a full-grown adult to a small juvenile, were found near Newcastle, Wyoming. The remains are currently under excavation by paleontologist Peter Larson and a team from the Black Hills Institute. It is believed that the animals were traveling as a family unit, but it remains unknown if the group consists of a mated pair and their offspring, or two females and a juvenile they were caring for. The remains also show signs of predation or scavenging from Tyrannosaurus, particularly on the largest specimen, with the bones of the front limbs showing breakage and puncture wounds from Tyrannosaurus teeth. In 2020, Illies and Fowler described the co-ossified distal caudal vertebrae of Triceratops. According to them, this pathology could have arisen after one Triceratops accidentally stepped on the tail of another member of the herd.

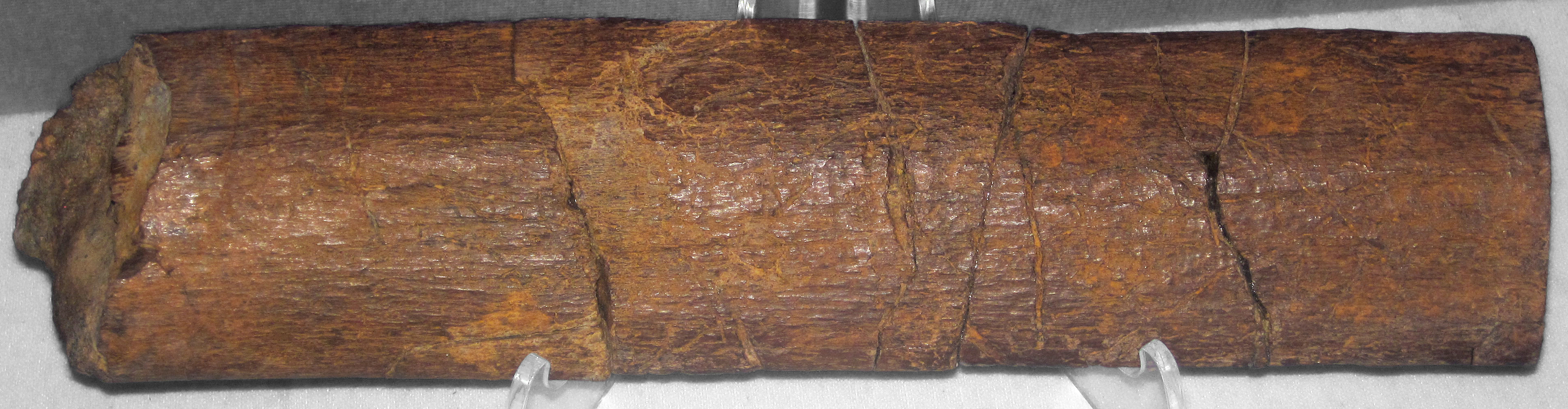
Triceratops rib with theropod tooth marks at the middle

For many years, Triceratops finds were known only from solitary individuals. These remains are very common. For example, Bruce Erickson, a paleontologist of the Science Museum of Minnesota, has reported having seen 200 specimens of T. prorsus in the Hell Creek Formation of Montana. Similarly, Barnum Brown claimed to have seen over 500 skulls in the field. Because Triceratops teeth, horn fragments, frill fragments, and other skull fragments are such abundant fossils in the Lancian faunal stage of the late Maastrichtian (Late Cretaceous, 66 mya) of western North America, it is regarded as one of the dominant herbivores of the time, if not the most dominant. In 1986, Robert Bakker estimated it as making up five sixths of the large dinosaur fauna at the end of the Cretaceous. Unlike most animals, skull fossils are far more common than postcranial bones for Triceratops, suggesting that the skull had an unusually high preservation potential.

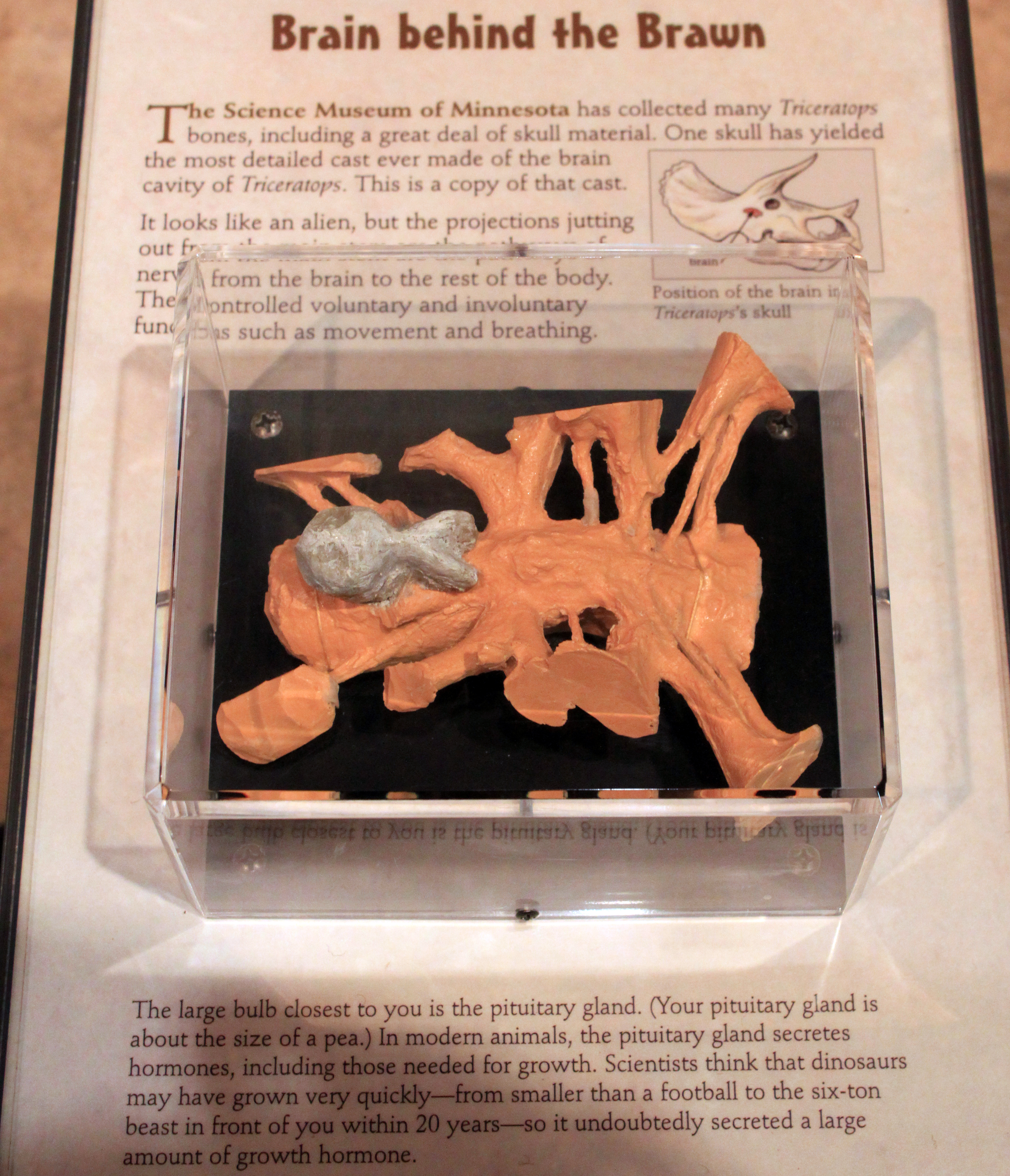
Brain endocast at Minnesota Science Museum

Analysis of the endocranial anatomy of Triceratops suggest its sense of smell was poor compared to that of other dinosaurs. Its ears were attuned to low frequency sounds, given the short cochlear lengths recorded in an analysis by Sakagami et al,. This same study also suggests that Triceratops held its head about 45 degrees to the ground, an angle which would showcase the horns and frill most effectively that simultaneously allowed the animal to take advantage of food through grazing. A 2026 study of the large nasal region suggested that Triceratops likely had respiratory turbinates which contained moisture that evaporated as air was inhaled. This released heat and cooled the blood directed to the eyes and brain, which would otherwise overheat within their large, thick skulls. The study also found that in ceratopsians, the lateral nasal nerve supplied the beak rather than the maxillary nerve as in other reptiles. The latter's path was obstructed by the beak and nasal cavity.

A 2022 study by Wiemann and colleagues of various dinosaur genera, including Triceratops, suggests that it had an ectothermic (cold blooded) or gigantothermic metabolism, on par with that of modern reptiles. This was uncovered using the spectroscopy of lipoxidation signals, which are byproducts of oxidative phosphorylation and correlate with metabolic rates. They suggested that such metabolisms may have been common for ornithischian dinosaurs in general, with the group evolving towards ectothermy from an ancestor with an endothermic (warm blooded) metabolism. An isotopic analysis study by Rooij and colleagues suggested that Triceratops was gigantothermic, if not endothermic due to its large body volume. The very same study conducted by Wiemann et al., revealed that Triceratops lived in environments that consisted of floodplains and inland forests.

=== Dentition and diet ===
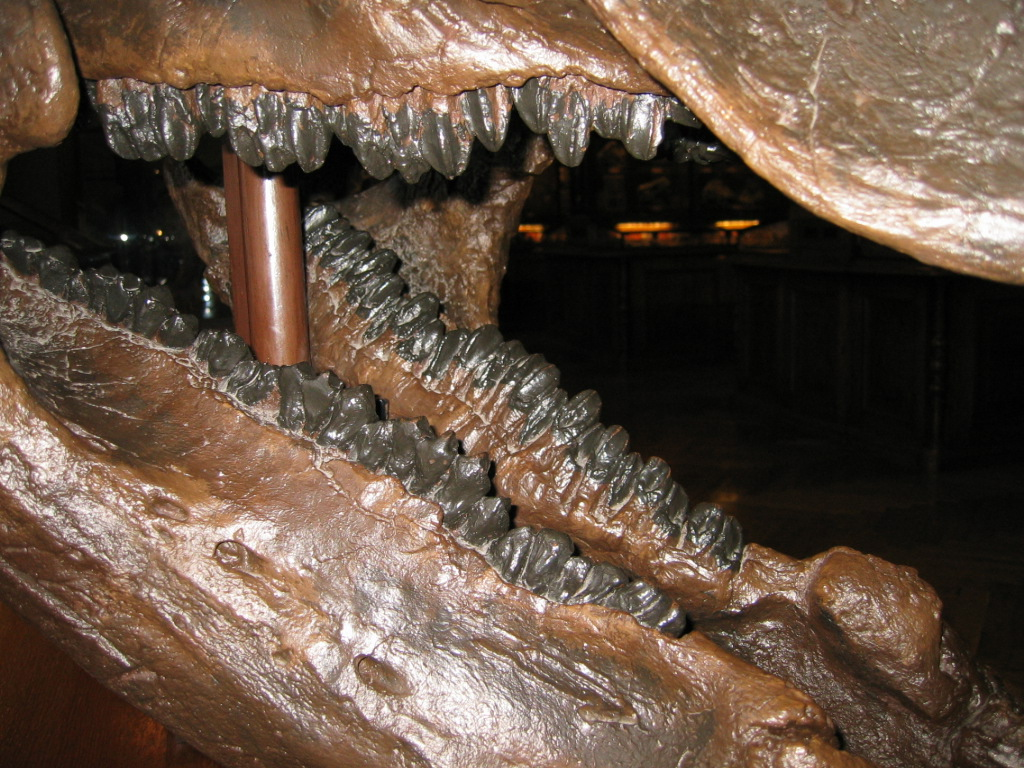
Close up of the jaws and teeth

Triceratops were herbivorous and, because of their low-slung head, their primary food was probably low-growing vegetation, although they may have been able to knock down taller plants with their horns, beak, and sheer bulk. The jaws were tipped with a deep, narrow beak, believed to have been better at grasping and plucking than biting.

Triceratops teeth were arranged in groups called batteries, which contained 36 to 40 tooth columns in each side of each jaw and 3 to 5 stacked teeth per column, depending on the size of the animal. This gives a range of 432 to 800 teeth, of which only a fraction were in use at any given time (as tooth replacement was continuous throughout the life of the animal). They functioned by shearing in a vertical to near-vertical orientation. Additionally, their teeth wore as they fed, creating fullers that minimised friction as they masticated. The great size and numerous teeth of Triceratops suggests that they ate large volumes of fibrous plant material. Other plants that were a part of its diet included Populus plants, Pine plants, Platanus plants, Hazel plants, and Taxodium plants. Some researchers suggest it, along with its cousin Torosaurus ate palms and cycads and others suggest it ate ferns, which then grew in prairies. Studies of the isotopes of ceratopsian and hadrosaur teeth revealed that Triceratops and Edmontosaurus respectively engaged in niche partitioning.

=== Functions of the horns and frill ===
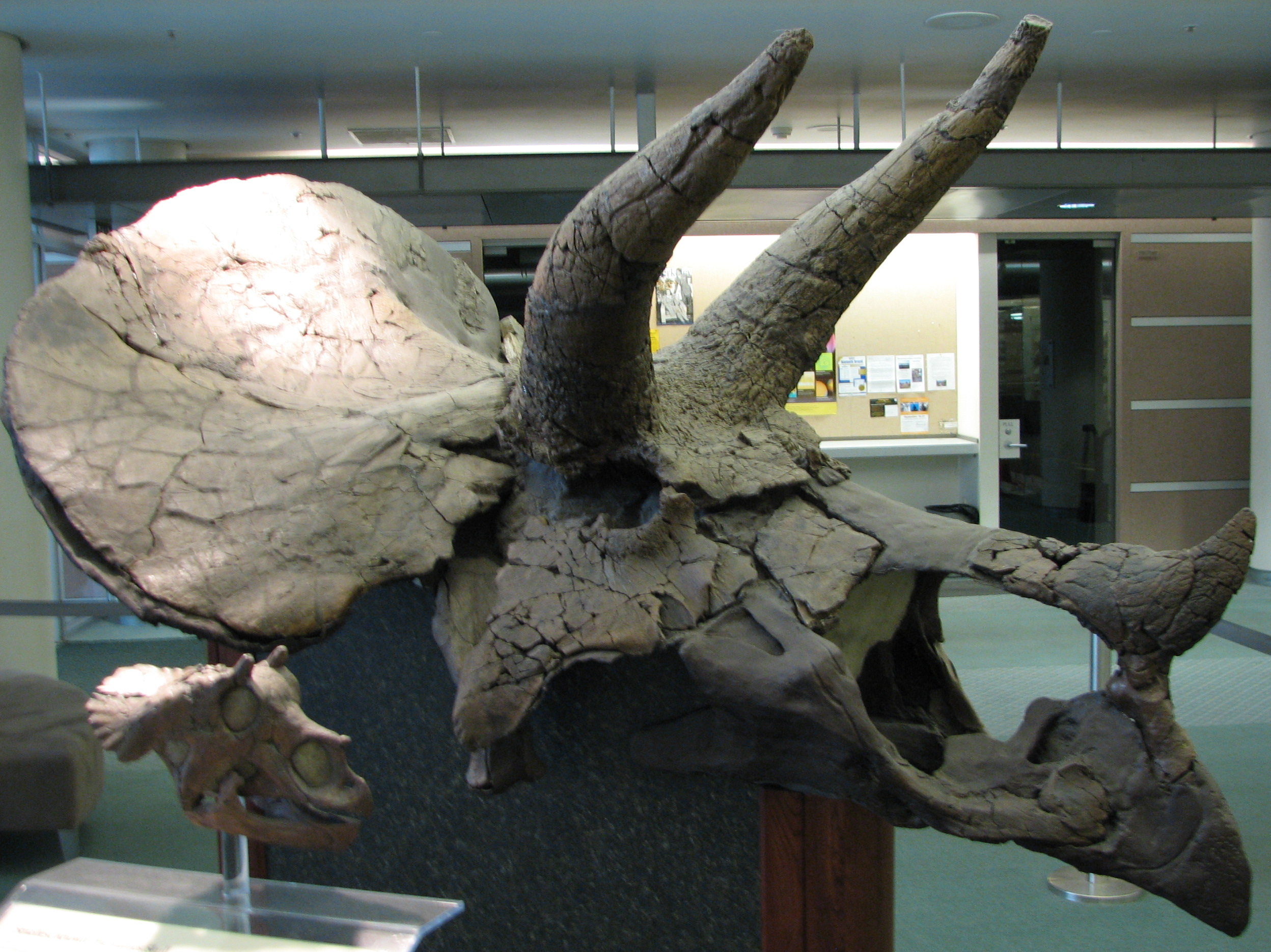
Juvenile and adult skulls—the juvenile skull is about the size of an adult human head

There has been much speculation over the functions of Triceratops' head adornments. The two main theories have revolved around use in combat and in courtship display, with the latter now thought to be the most likely primary function.

Early on, Lull postulated that the frills may have served as anchor points for the jaw muscles to aid chewing by allowing increased size and power for the muscles. This has been put forward by other authors over the years, but later studies do not find evidence of large muscle attachments on the frill bones.

Triceratops were long thought to have used their horns and frills in combat with large predators, such as Tyrannosaurus, the idea being discussed first by Charles H. Sternberg in 1917 and 70 years later by Robert Bakker. There is direct fossil evidence that Tyrannosaurus did have aggressive head-on encounters with Triceratops, based on partially healed tyrannosaur tooth marks on a Triceratops brow horn and squamosal. The bitten horn is also broken, with new bone growth after the break. Which animal was the aggressor, however, is unknown. Paleontologist Peter Dodson estimates that, in a battle against a bull Tyrannosaurus, the Triceratops had the upper hand and would successfully defend itself by inflicting fatal wounds to the Tyrannosaurus using its sharp horns. Tyrannosaurus is also known to have consumed Triceratops, as shown by a heavily tooth-scored Triceratops ilium and sacrum showing Tyrannosaurus feeding traces.

In addition to combat with predators using its horns, Triceratops are popularly shown engaging each other in combat with horns locked. While studies show that such activity would be feasible, if unlike that of present-day horned animals, there is disagreement about whether they did so. Although pitting, holes, lesions, and other damage on Triceratops skulls (and the skulls of other ceratopsids) are often attributed to horn damage in combat, a 2006 study finds no evidence for horn thrust injuries causing these forms of damage (with there being no evidence of infection or healing). Instead, non-pathological bone resorption, or unknown bone diseases, are suggested as causes. A 2009 study compared incidence rates of skull lesions and periosteal reaction in Triceratops and Centrosaurus, showing that these were consistent with Triceratops using its horns in combat and the frill being adapted as a protective structure, while lower pathology rates in Centrosaurus may indicate visual use over physical use of cranial ornamentation or a form of combat focused on the body rather than the head. The frequency of injury was found to be 14% in Triceratops. The researchers also concluded that the damage found on the specimens in the study was often too localized to be caused by bone disease. Histological examination reveals that the frill of Triceratops is composed of fibrolamellar bone. This contains fibroblasts that play a critical role in wound healing and is capable of rapidly depositing bone during remodeling.

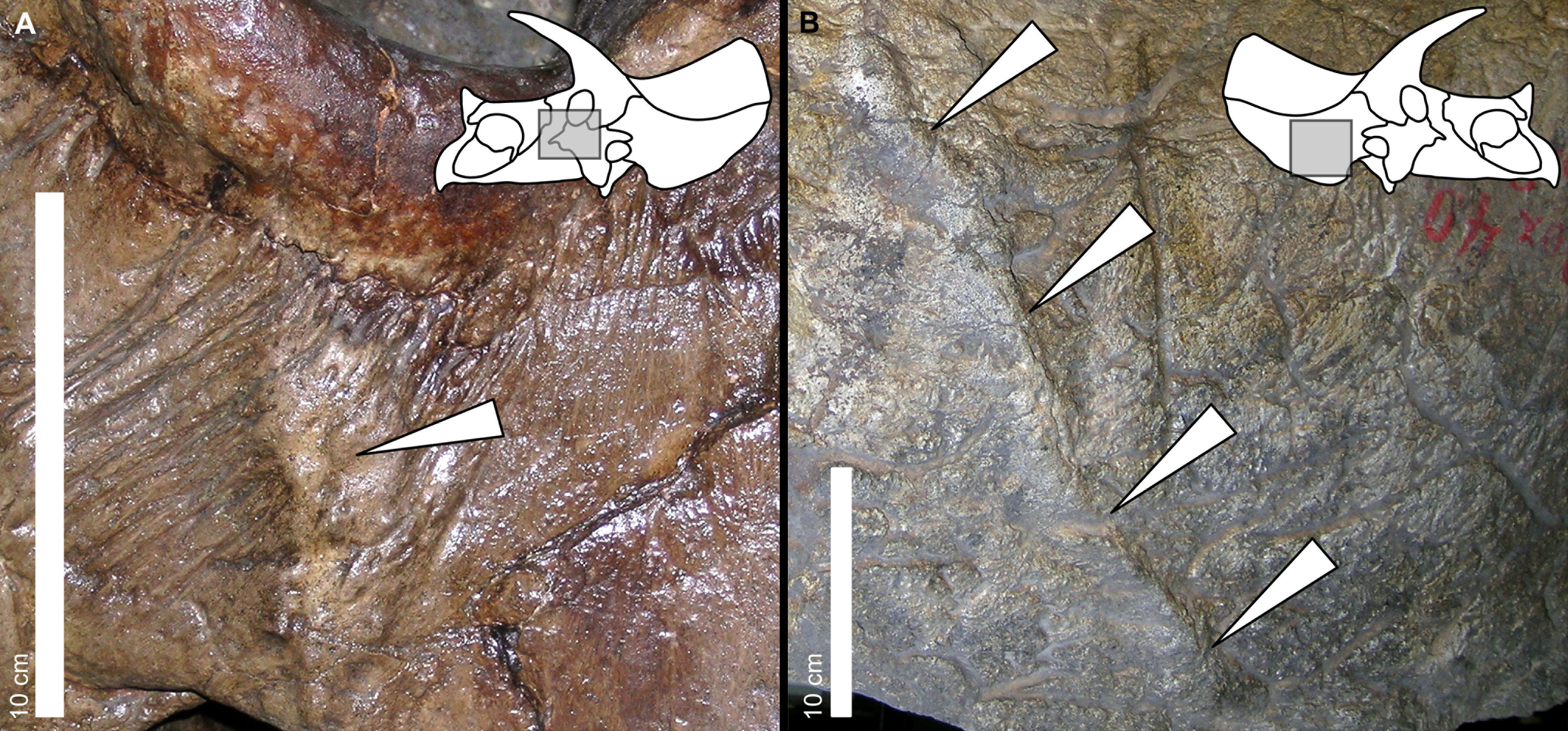
Examples of periosteal reactive bone in selected specimens of Triceratops

One skull was found with a hole in the jugal bone, apparently a puncture wound sustained while the animal was alive, as indicated by signs of healing. The hole has a diameter close to that of the distal end of a Triceratops horn. This and other apparent healed wounds in the skulls of ceratopsians have been cited as evidence of non-fatal intra-specific competition in these dinosaurs. Another specimen, referred to as "Big John", has a similar fenestra to the squamosal caused by what appears to be another Triceratops horn and the squamosal bone shows signs of significant healing, further vindicating the hypothesis that this ceratopsian used its horns for intra-specific combat.

The large frill also may have helped to increase body area to regulate body temperature. A similar theory has been proposed regarding the plates of Stegosaurus, although this use alone would not account for the bizarre and extravagant variation seen in different members of Ceratopsidae, which would rather support the sexual display theory.

The theory that frills functioned as a sexual display was first proposed by Davitashvili in 1961 and has gained increasing acceptance since. Evidence that visual display was important, either in courtship or other social behavior, can be seen in the ceratopsians differing markedly in their adornments, making each species highly distinctive. Also, modern living creatures with such displays of horns and adornments use them similarly. A 2006 study of the smallest Triceratops skull, ascertained to be that of a juvenile, shows the frill and horns developed at a very early age, predating sexual development. That would suggest they were probably important for visual communication and species recognition in general. However, the use of the exaggerated structures to enable dinosaurs to recognize their own species has been questioned, as no such function exists for such structures in modern species.

=== Growth and ontogeny ===
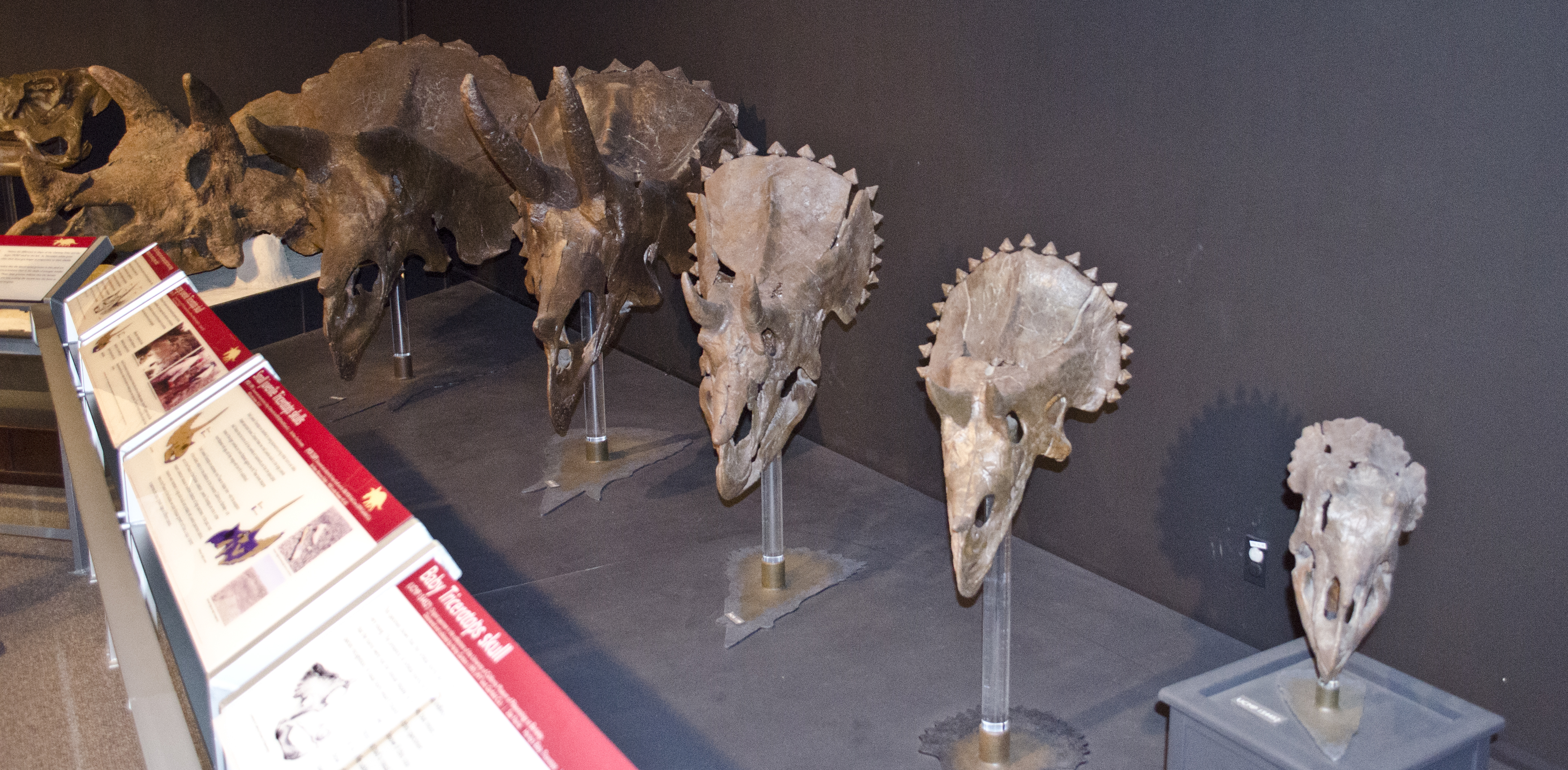
Skull growth series

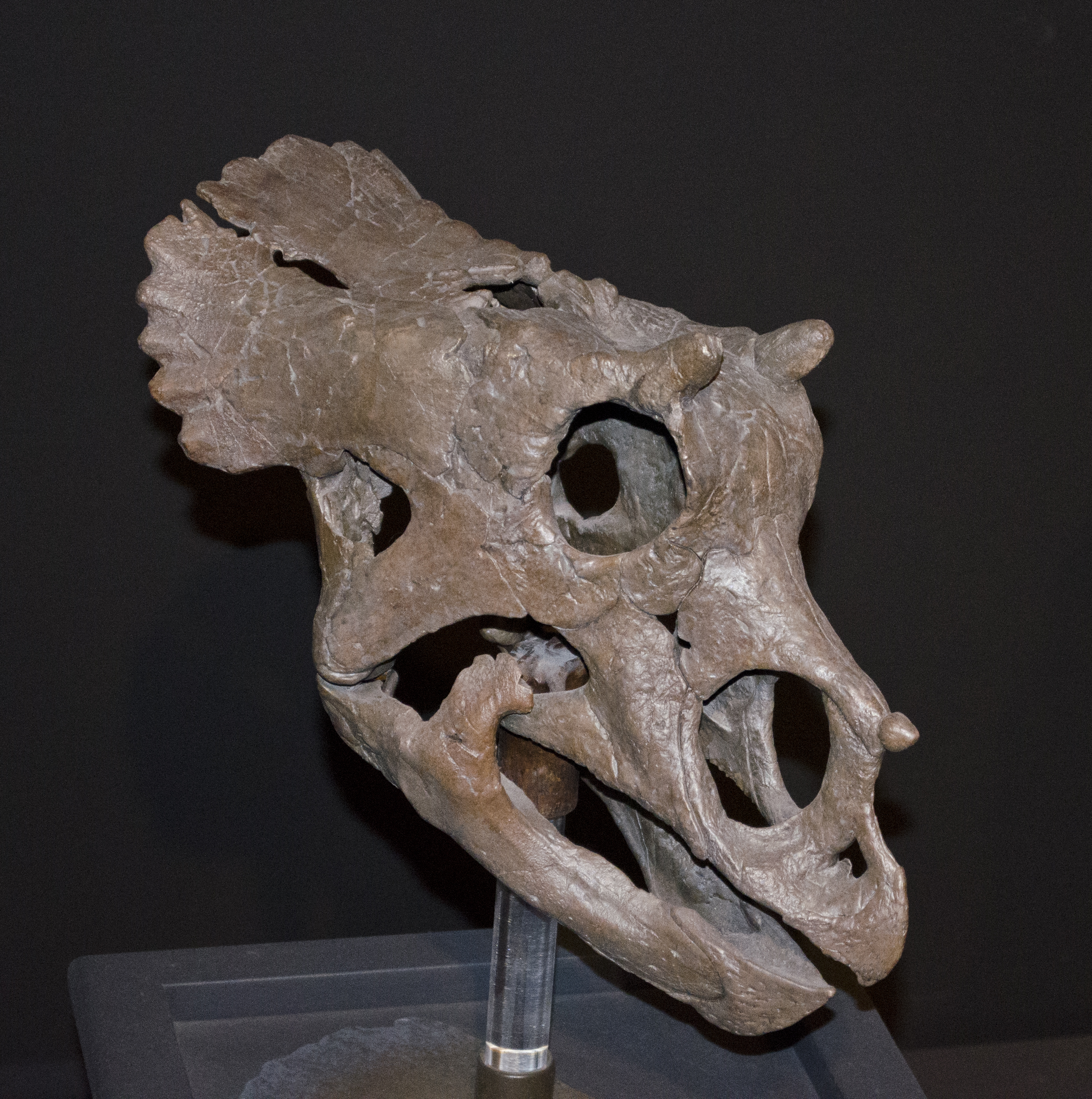
Juvenile Triceratops skull found in Montana (cast)

In 2006, the first extensive ontogenetic study of Triceratops was published in the journal Proceedings of the Royal Society. The study, by John R. Horner and Mark Goodwin, found that individuals of Triceratops could be divided into four general ontogenetic groups: babies, juveniles, subadults, and adults. With a total number of 28 skulls studied, the youngest was only 38 centimeters (15 in) long. Ten of the 28 skulls could be placed in order in a growth series with one representing each age. Each of the four growth stages were found to have identifying features. Multiple ontogenetic trends were discovered, including the size reduction of the epoccipitals, development and reorientation of postorbital horns, and hollowing out of the horns. Big John, one of the Triceratops, is estimated to have lived around 60 years when he died.

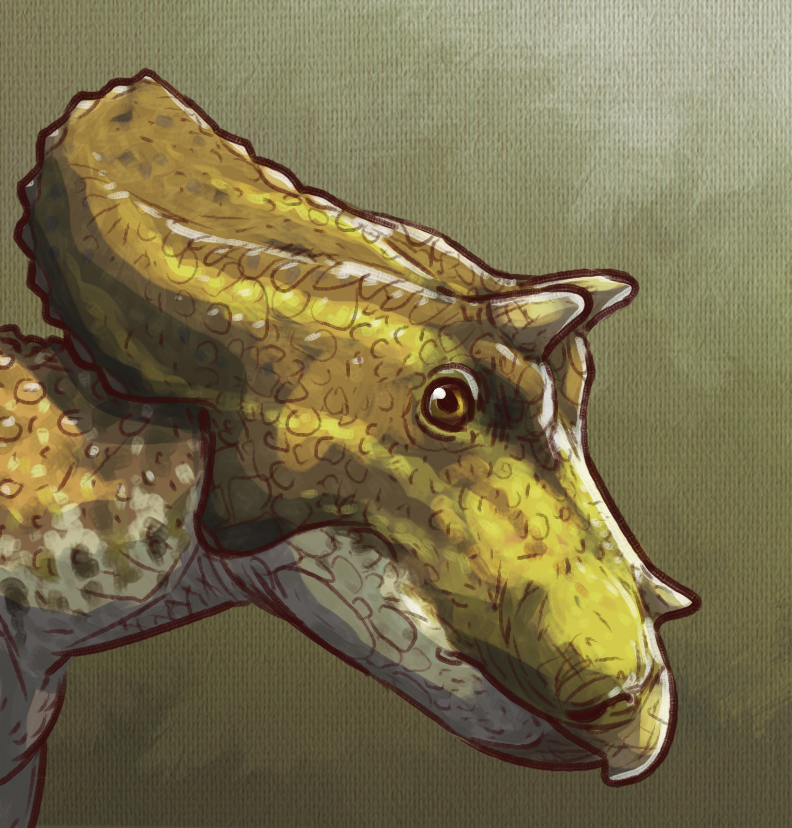
Speculative life restoration of a juvenile Triceratops

==== Torosaurus as growth stage of Triceratops ====
Torosaurus is a ceratopsid genus first identified from a pair of skulls in 1891, two years after the identification of Triceratops by Othneil Charles Marsh. The genus Torosaurus resembles Triceratops in geological age, distribution, anatomy, and size, so it has been recognised as a close relative. Its distinguishing features are an elongated skull and the presence of two ovular fenestrae in the frill. Paleontologists investigating dinosaur ontogeny in Montana's Hell Creek Formation have presented evidence that the two represent a single genus.

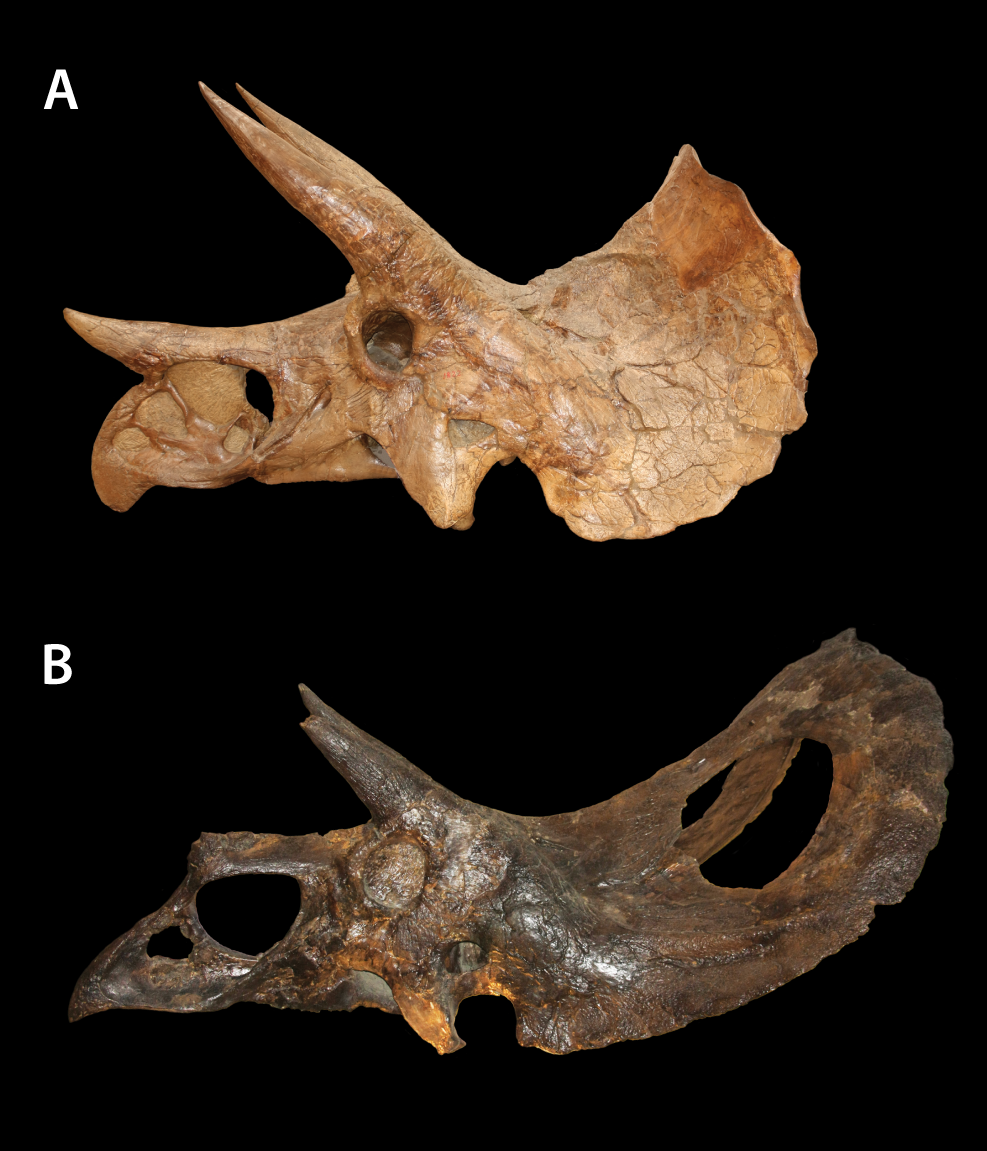
A, Triceratops prorsus holotype YPM 1822 and B, Torosaurus latus ANSP 15192

John Scannella, in a paper presented in Bristol at the conference of the Society of Vertebrate Paleontology (September 25, 2009), reclassified Torosaurus as especially mature Triceratops individuals, perhaps representing a single sex. Horner, Scannella's mentor at Bozeman Campus, Montana State University, noted that ceratopsian skulls consist of metaplastic bone. A characteristic of metaplastic bone is that it lengthens and shortens over time, extending and resorbing to form new shapes. Significant variety is seen even in those skulls already identified as Triceratops, Horner said, "where the horn orientation is backwards in juveniles and forward in adults". Approximately 50% of all subadult Triceratops skulls have two thin areas in the frill that correspond with the placement of "holes" in Torosaurus skulls, suggesting that holes developed to offset the weight that would otherwise have been added as maturing Triceratops individuals grew longer frills. A paper describing these findings in detail was published in July 2010 by Scannella and Horner. It formally argues that Torosaurus and the similar contemporary Nedoceratops are synonymous with Triceratops.

The assertion has since ignited much debate. Andrew Farke had, in 2006, stressed that no systematic differences could be found between Torosaurus and Triceratops, apart from the frill. He nevertheless disputed Scannella's conclusion by arguing in 2011 that the proposed morphological changes required to "age" a Triceratops into a Torosaurus would be without precedent among ceratopsids. Such changes would include the growth of additional epoccipitals, reversion of bone texture from an adult to immature type and back to adult again, and growth of frill holes at a later stage than usual. A study by Nicholas Longrich and Daniel Field analyzed 35 specimens of both Triceratops and Torosaurus. The authors concluded that Triceratops individuals too old to be considered immature forms are represented in the fossil record, as are Torosaurus individuals too young to be considered fully mature adults. The synonymy of Triceratops and Torosaurus cannot be supported, they said, without more convincing intermediate forms than Scannella and Horner initially produced. Scannella's Triceratops specimen with a hole on its frill, they argued, could represent a diseased or malformed individual rather than a transitional stage between an immature Triceratops and mature Torosaurus form.

In 2013, Farke and Leonardo Maiorino published morphometric research, a statistical analysis of the morphospace (shape space) describing the variation of the Torosaurus, Triceratops horridus, Triceratops prorsus, and Nedoceratops skulls correlated with maturation. They concluded that Torosaurus latus skulls throughout maturation retained a different form from T. horridus and T. prorsus, the last two species showing an overlapping in their proportions. This is even true when the frill shape is disregarded. Nedoceratops proved, except for size, not to be a plausible transitional form between Torosaurus and Triceratops horridus. Farke and Maiorino admitted that the low number of Torosaurus specimens reduced the reliability of these results, but concluded that Torosaurus and Triceratops were separate taxa, though allowing for the possibility of anagenesis, i.e. the several taxa forming a single chronospecies line of descent, given the lack of good stratigraphic data. The morphometric study was inconclusive on the point of Torosaurus utahensis, for which most specimens consist of isolated bones, with its morphospace falling in between Triceratops and Torosaurus latus and not well separated from either.

Researchers have claimed that distinct juvenile Torosaurus have been excavated from a bonebed in the Javelina Formation of Big Bend National Park, basing their identification as Torosaurus cf. utahensis on their proximity to an adult with a characteristic Torosaurus parietal. In 2022, Mallon et al. argued that two specimens found in Canada's Frenchman and Scollard Formations, EM P16.1. (at Eastend Historical Museum in Saskatchewan) and UALVP 1646 (at the University of Alberta), are subadults and can be referred to Torosaurus, this indicating that it is a valid taxon. The same study also noted that Torosaurus indeed lived during the Late Maastrichtian (contemporaneously with Triceratops).

==== Other genera as growth stages of Triceratops ====
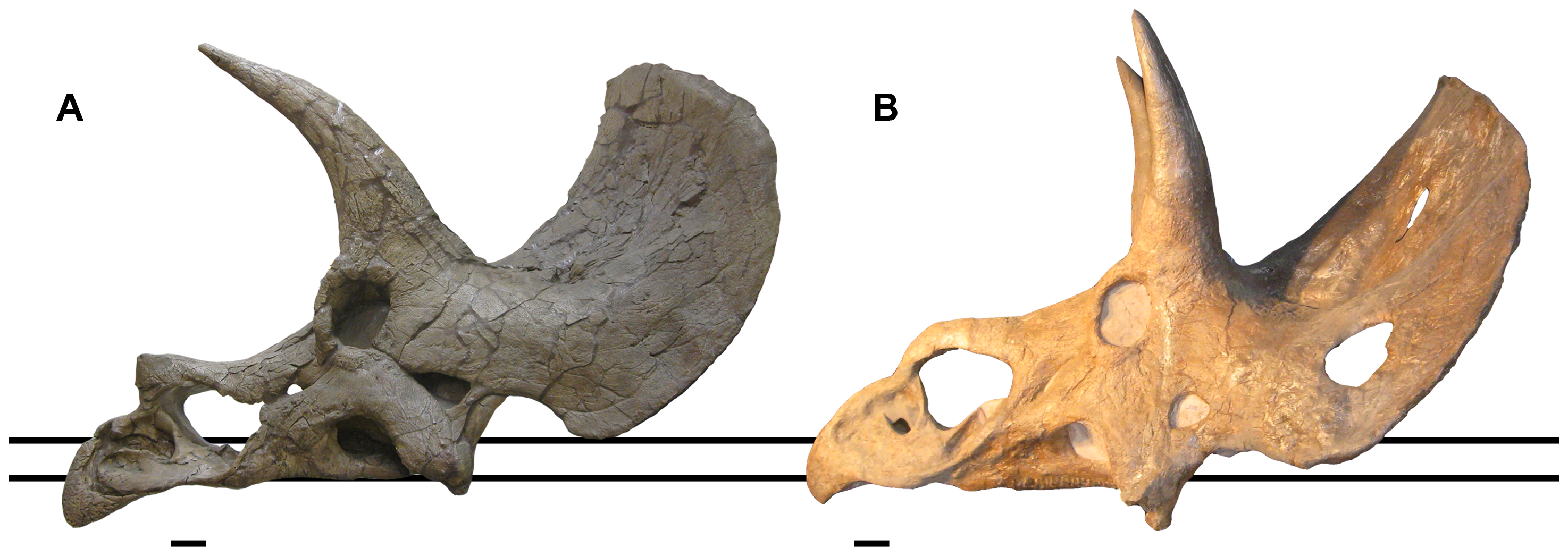
Comparisons between the skulls of Triceratops and Nedoceratops

Opinion has varied on the validity of a separate genus for Nedoceratops. Scannella and Horner regarded it as an intermediate growth stage between Triceratops and Torosaurus. Farke, in his 2011 redescription of the only known skull, concluded that it was an aged individual of its own valid taxon, Nedoceratops hatcheri. Longrich and Fields also did not consider it a transition between Torosaurus and Triceratops, suggesting that the frill holes were pathological.

As described above, Scannella had argued in 2010 that Nedoceratops should be considered a synonym of Triceratops. Farke (2011) maintained that it represents a valid distinct genus. Longrich agreed with Scannella about Nedoceratops and made a further suggestion that the recently described Ojoceratops was likewise a synonym. The fossils, he argued, are indistinguishable from the Triceratops horridus specimens that were previously attributed to the defunct species Triceratops serratus.

Longrich observed that another newly described genus, Tatankaceratops, displayed a strange mix of characteristics already found in adult and juvenile Triceratops. Rather than representing a distinct genus, Tatankaceratops could as easily represent a dwarf Triceratops or a Triceratops individual with a developmental disorder that caused it to stop growing prematurely.

== Paleoecology ==
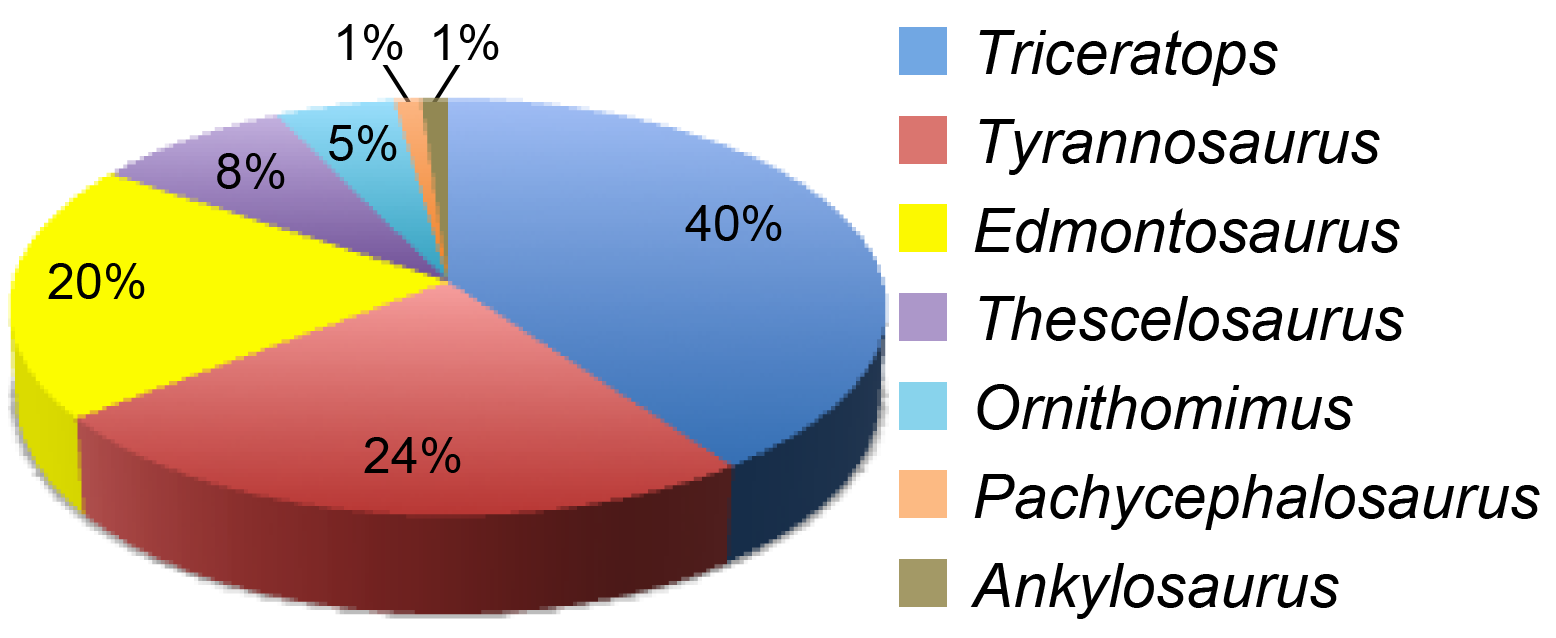
Pie chart of the time averaged census for large-bodied dinosaurs from the entire Hell Creek Formation in the study area

Triceratops lived during the Late Cretaceous of western North America, its fossils coming from the Evanston Formation, Scollard Formation, Laramie Formation, Lance Formation, Denver Formation, and Hell Creek Formation. These fossil formations date back to the time of the Cretaceous–Paleogene extinction event, which has been dated to 66 ± 0.07 million years ago. Many animals and plants have been found in these formations, but mostly from the Lance Formation and Hell Creek Formation. Triceratops was one of the last ceratopsian genera to appear before the end of the Mesozoic. The related Torosaurus and more distantly related diminutive Leptoceratops were also present, though their remains have been rarely encountered. Isotopic analysis suggests Triceratops specimens from DTB (Darnell Triceratops Bonebed) could've inhabited freshwater floodplains, although the it likely wasn't restricted to one environment.

Theropods from these formations include genera of dromaeosaurids, tyrannosaurids, ornithomimids, troodontids, avialans, and caenagnathids. Dromaeosaurids from the Hell Creek Formation are Acheroraptor and Dakotaraptor. Indeterminate dromaeosaurs are known from other fossil formations. Common teeth previously referred to Dromaeosaurus and Saurornitholestes were considered to be those of Acheroraptor. The tyrannosauroids from the formation are Nanotyrannus and Tyrannosaurus. Among ornithomimids are the genera Struthiomimus and Ornithomimus. An undescribed animal named "Orcomimus" could be from the formation. Troodontids are only represented by Pectinodon and Paronychodon in the Hell Creek Formation with a possible species of Troodon from the Lance Formation. One species of unknown coelurosaur is known from teeth in the Hell Creek and similar formations by a single species, Richardoestesia. Oviraptorosaurs from the Hell Creek Formation include Anzu., and avialans include Avisaurus, multiple species of Brodavis, and several other species of hesperornithoforms, as well as several species of true birds, including Cimolopteryx.

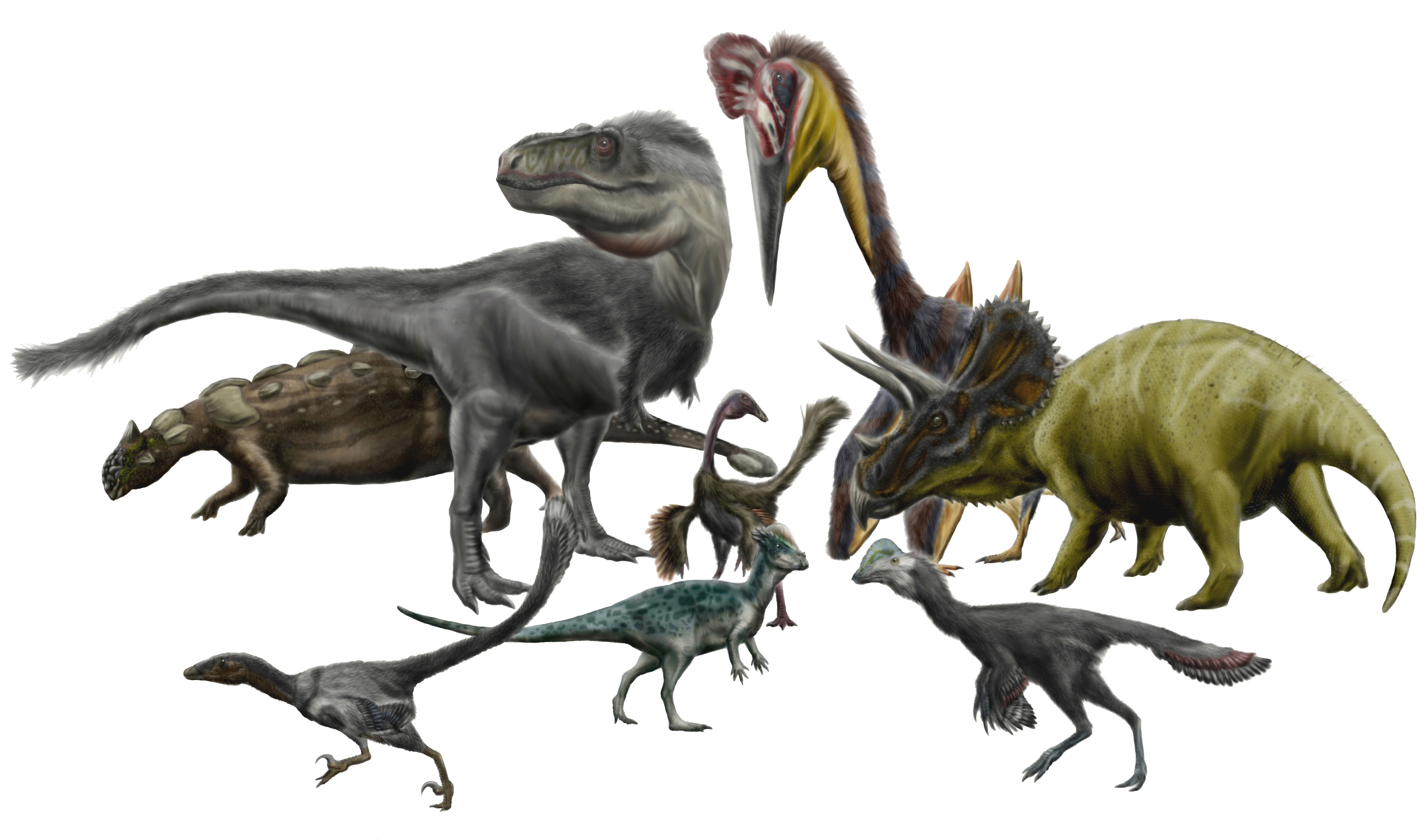
Triceratops and other animals of the Hell Creek Formation

Ornithischians are abundant in the Scollard, Laramie, Lance, Denver, and Hell Creek Formation. The main groups of ornithischians are ankylosaurians, ornithopods, ceratopsians, and pachycephalosaurians. Three ankylosaurians are known: Ankylosaurus, Denversaurus, and possibly a species of Edmontonia or an undescribed genus. Multiple genera of ceratopsians are known from the formation other than Triceratops. These include the leptoceratopsid Leptoceratops and the chasmosaurine ceratopsids Torosaurus, Nedoceratops, and Tatankaceratops. Ornithopods are common in the Hell Creek Formation and are known from several species of the thescelosaurine Thescelosaurus and the hadrosaurid Edmontosaurus. Several pachycephalosaurians have been found in the Hell Creek Formation and in similar formations. Among them are the derived pachycephalosaurids Stygimoloch, Dracorex, Pachycephalosaurus, Sphaerotholus, and an undescribed specimen from North Dakota. The first two might be junior synonyms of Pachycephalosaurus.

Mammals are plentiful in the Hell Creek Formation. Groups represented include multituberculates, metatherians, and eutherians. The multituberculates represented include Paracimexomys, the cimolomyids Paressonodon, Meniscoessus, Essonodon, Cimolomys, Cimolodon, and Cimexomys, and the neoplagiaulacids Mesodma and Neoplagiaulax. The metatherians are represented by the alphadontids Alphadon, Protalphodon, and Turgidodon, the pediomyids Pediomys, Protolambda, and Leptalestes, the stagodontid Didelphodon, the deltatheridiid Nanocuris, the herpetotheriid Nortedelphys, and the glasbiid Glasbius. A few eutherians are known, being represented by Alostera, Protungulatum, the cimolestids Cimolestes and Batodon, the gypsonictopsid Gypsonictops, and the possible nyctitheriid Paranyctoides.

== Cultural significance ==
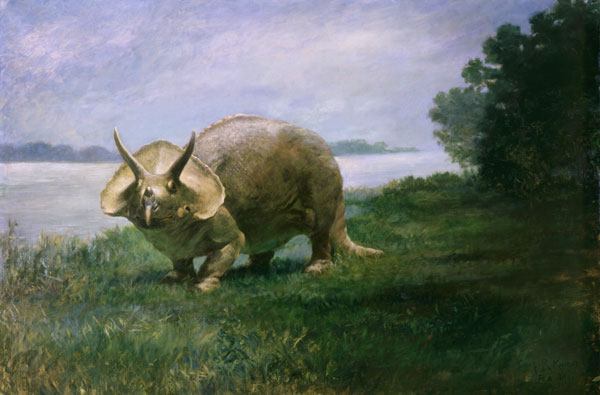
1901 illustration by Charles R. Knight

Since at least the early 20th century, Triceratops has been among the most famous dinosaurs and an archetypal ceratopsian. It has been popularly displayed at natural history museums due to the abundance of fossils. A mounted Triceratops skeleton was exhibited at the 1900 Paris Exposition, possibly the earliest display of the dinosaur, and was seen by 21,000 visitors during the first two days. Similarly, a model Triceratops by American sculptor Louis Paul Jonas was displayed at the 1964 New York World's Fair.

Triceratops is a staple of dinosaur films including The Lost World (1925) and Jurassic Park (1993). In literature, they appear as "Gryfs" in Edgar Rice Burroughs's 1921 novel Tarzan the Terrible, while the 1956 children's book The Enormous Egg by Oliver Butterworth features a Triceratops hatching from a chicken egg. After Tyrannosaurus and Stegosaurus, it has been the most frequently depicted dinosaur on stamps. Triceratops is the official state fossil of South Dakota and the official state dinosaur of Wyoming.

In 1928, Charles R. Knight painted a mural incorporating a confrontation between a Tyrannosaurus and a Triceratops in the Field Museum of Natural History in Chicago, establishing them as enemies in the popular imagination. Paleontologist Robert Bakker said of the imagined rivalry between Tyrannosaurus and Triceratops, "No matchup between predator and prey has ever been more dramatic. It's somehow fitting that those two massive antagonists lived out their co-evolutionary belligerence through the last days of the last epoch of the Age of Dinosaurs."

== See also ==
- Uncle Beazley
