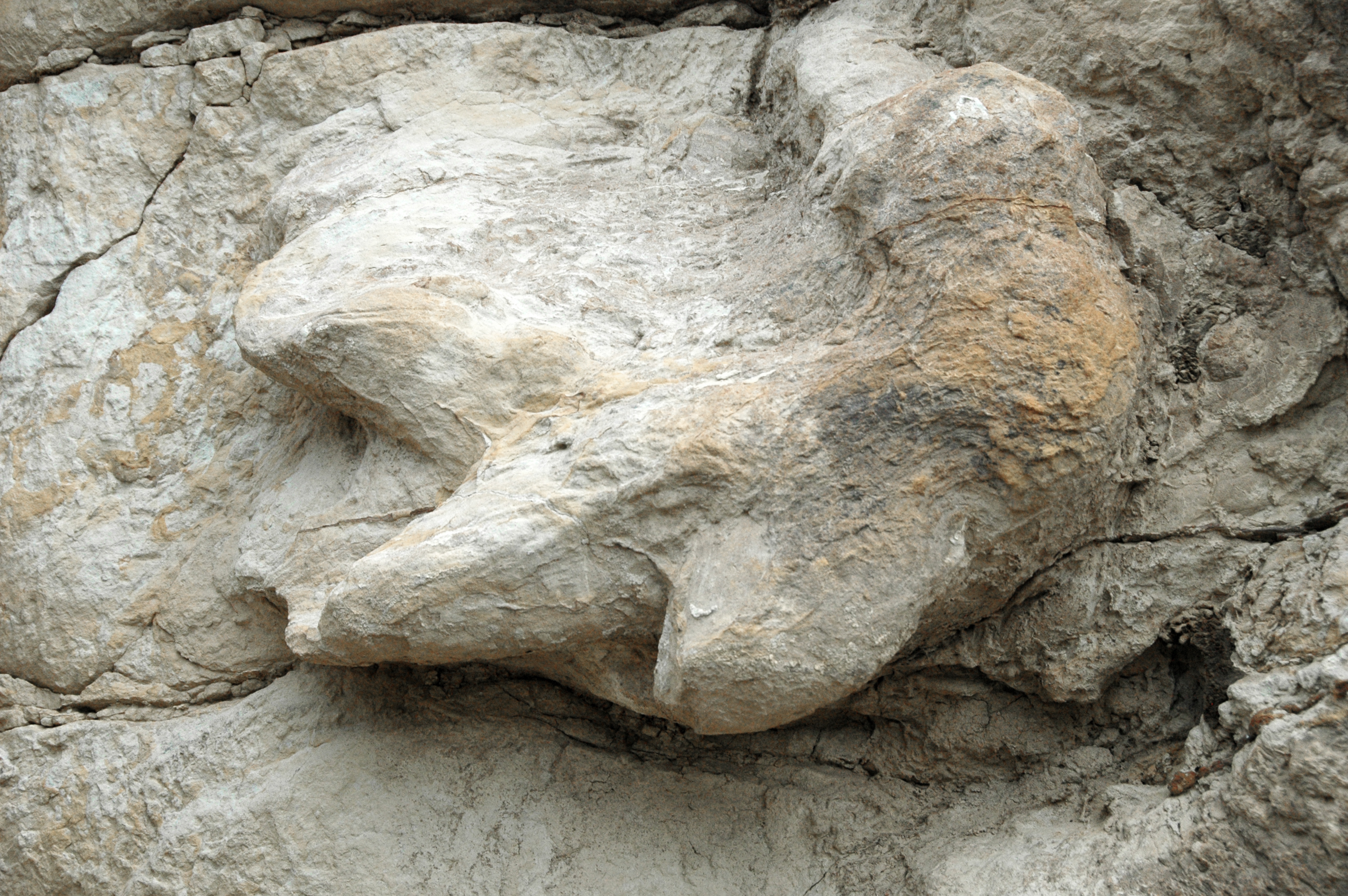
- Ceratopsipes goldenensis

Trace fossil classification
- Domain: Eukaryota
- Kingdom: Animalia
- Phylum: Chordata
- Clade: Dinosauria
- Clade: †Ornithischia
- Clade: †Ceratopsia
- Ichnogenus: †Ceratopsipes; Lockley & Hunt, 1995

Type ichnospecies
- †Ceratopsipes goldenensis Lockley & Hunt, 1995

= Ceratopsipes =

Ceratopsipes Temporal range: Maastrichtian, 69–68 Ma

Dinosaur footprint

Ceratopsipes goldenensis is an ichnospecies of dinosaur footprint, described in 1995 from the Laramie Formation in Colorado. It is represented by massive pes prints approaching 80 centimetres (31 in) in width. If undistorted, the tracks may represent an unusually large Ceratopsian dinosaur that could have potentially been as large as 12 metres (39.4 feet).

== See also ==
- List of dinosaur ichnogenera

== Literature ==
- Glut, Donald F. (2003). "Appendix: Dinosaur Tracks and Eggs". Dinosaurs: The Encyclopedia. 3rd Supplement. Jefferson, North Carolina: McFarland & Company, Inc. pp. 613–652. ISBN 0-7864-1166-X.
- Lockley, M. G. (1986). A Guide to Dinosaur Tracksites of the Colorado Plateau and American Southwest. University of Colorado at Denver Geology Department Magazine, Special Issue, 1: 1-56.
- Carpenter, K. and Young, B. (2002). Late Cretaceous dinosaurs from the Denver Basin, Colorado. In K. R. Johnson, R. G. Raynolds and M. L. Reynolds (eds). Paleontology and Stratigraphy of Laramide Strata in the Denver Basin, Pt. I., Rocky Mountain Geology. 37: 237-254.
