= Edmonton Group =

Stratigraphic unit in central Alberta, Canada

- Stratigraphic range: Late Cretaceous to Early Paleocene
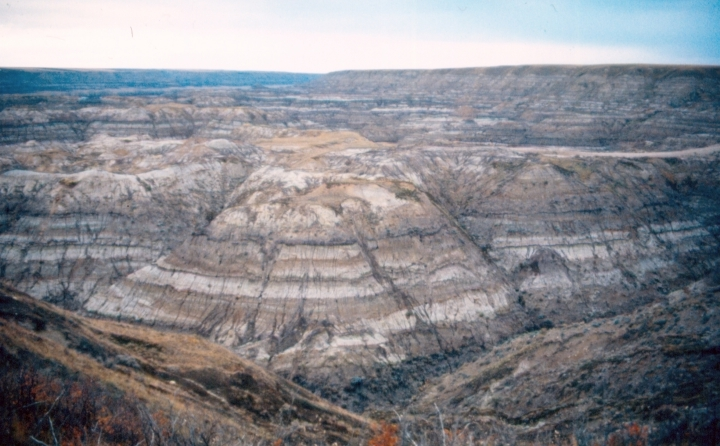
- Horseshoe Canyon Formation of the Edmonton Group
- Type: Geological group
- Sub-units: Scollard Formation, Battle Formation, Whitemud Formation, Horseshoe Canyon Formation
- Underlies: Paskapoo Formation
- Overlies: Bearpaw Formation, Belly River Group
- Thickness: 328 metres (1,076 ft) to 763 metres (2,503 ft)

Lithology
- Primary: Sandstone, shale
- Other: Bentonite, coal

Location
- Region: Alberta
- Country: Canada

Type section
- Named for: Edmonton
- Named by: Joseph Tyrrell, 1887

Within the earth science of geology, the Edmonton Group is a Late Cretaceous (Campanian stage) to early Paleocene stratigraphic unit of the Western Canada Sedimentary Basin in the central Alberta plains. It was first described as the Edmonton Formation by Joseph Burr Tyrrell in 1887 based on outcrops along the North Saskatchewan River in and near the city of Edmonton. E.J.W. Irish later elevated the formation to group status and it was subdivided into four separate formations. In ascending order, they are the Horseshoe Canyon, Whitemud, Battle and Scollard Formations. The Cretaceous-Paleogene boundary occurs within the Scollard Formation, based on dinosaurian and microfloral evidence, as well as the presence of the terminal Cretaceous iridium anomaly.

== Distribution and thickness ==
The Edmonton Group is present in the central plains of Alberta. It consists of sedimentary rocks that were deposited in nonmarine to brackish water environments between the Canadian Rockies in the west and the Western Interior Seaway to the east. Its reaches a maximum thickness of 763 metres (2,503 ft) near the foothills of the Rockies in the west, and thins eastward to zero at its erosional edge east of Edmonton.

== Lithology ==
The Edmonton Group consists of fine-grained sandstones, calcareous sandstones, siltstones, sandy shales and mudstones, bentonitic sandstones and shales, bentonite beds, ironstone concretions, carbonaceous shales and coal seams. Hard sandstones commonly cap mesas, buttes and plateaus where erosion has formed badlands topography, as is the case for much of the Horseshoe Canyon Formation and the Scollard Formation. Coarse-grained sediments are rare in the Edmonton Group.

== Paleontology ==
Plant fossils are common in both the Late Cretaceous and early Paleocene portions of the Edmonton Group. Remains of Triceratops and other dinosaurs are found in the Late Cretaceous portion, especially the Horseshoe Canyon Formation and the lower part of the Scollard Formation. Molluscs such as Ostrea and Unio are found in both portions.

== Relationship to other units ==
The Edmonton Group is disconformably overlain by the Paskapoo Formation and conformably overlies the Bearpaw Formation or, where the Bearpaw is absent, the Belly River Formation.

The Edmonton Group grades into the sequence of the Blood Reserve Formation, St. Mary River Formation and Willow Creek Formation in the southern Alberta plains; into the upper part of the Wapiti Group in the northern Alberta and northeastern British Columbia; and into the upper part of the Brazeau Formation and the Coalspur Formation in the foothills of the Canadian Rockies. It is equivalent to, but not contiguous with, the Eastend Formation, Whitemud Formation, Battle Formation and Frenchman Formation in the Cypress Hills of southeastern Alberta and southwestern Saskatchewan; and with the Fox Hills Formation in Saskatchewan.

Formations that are stratigraphically equivalent in the western United States are the Horsethief Formation in Montana; the Fox Hills Formation and Lance Formation in Montana; and the Lennup Formation and Muteetse Formation in Wyoming.

=== Subdivisions ===
The formations of the Edmonton Group are:

Formation	Age	Lithology	Maximum thickness	Reference
Scollard	Maastrichtian-Paleocene	sandstone, siltstone, mudstone, coal	400 m (1,310 ft)	
Battle Formation	Maastrichtian	bentonitic silty shale, montmorillonitic clay	14 m (50 ft)	
Whitemud	Maastrichtian	kaolinitic sandstone, clay, shale	23 m (80 ft)	
Horseshoe Canyon	Campanian-Maastrichtian	sandstone, siltstone, mudstone, coal	227 m (740 ft)	

== See also ==
- List of fossiliferous stratigraphic units in Alberta
- Coalspur Formation
