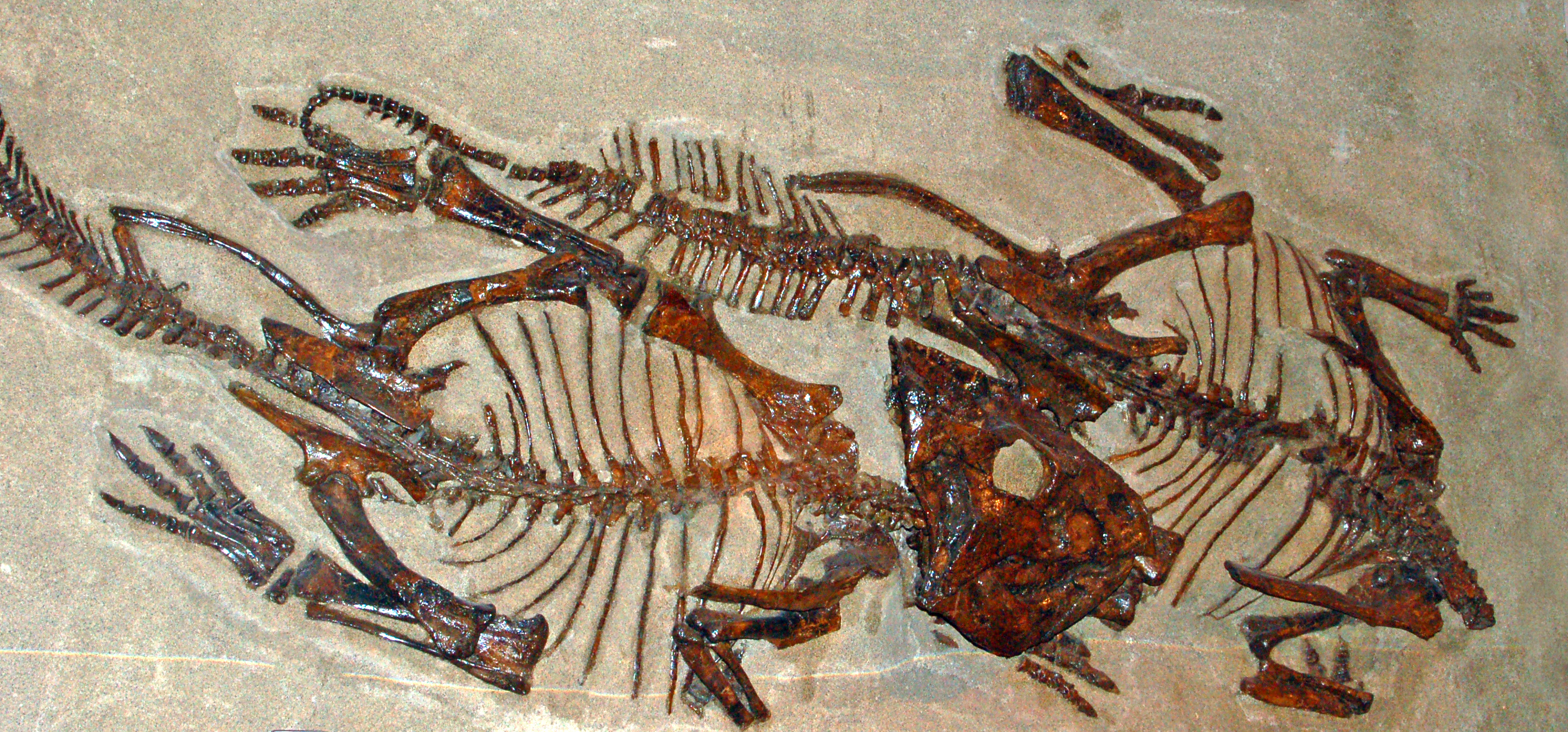
- Fossils CMN 8888 and CMN 8887 at the Canadian Museum of Nature, Ottawa

Scientific classification
- Kingdom: Animalia
- Phylum: Chordata
- Class: Reptilia
- Clade: Dinosauria
- Clade: †Ornithischia
- Clade: †Ceratopsia
- Family: †Leptoceratopsidae
- Genus: †Leptoceratops; Brown, 1914
- Species: †L. gracilis

Binomial name
- †Leptoceratops gracilis Brown, 1914

= Leptoceratops =

Leptoceratops Temporal range: Late Cretaceous (Maastrichtian), 67.2–66.2 Ma

Extinct genus of ceratopsian dinosaur

Leptoceratops (meaning 'small horn face') is a genus of ceratopsian dinosaur from the Late Cretaceous of North America. First found in Alberta in 1910, the type species Leptoceratops gracilis was named in 1914 by Barnum Brown for a partial skull and skeleton of two individuals found in the Scollard Formation of Alberta. Additional specimens found in the Scollard include one complete and two mostly complete skeletons together, uncovered in 1947 by Charles M. Sternberg. Specimens from Montana that were among the earliest referred to Leptoceratops have since been moved to their own genera Montanoceratops and Cerasinops, while new specimens of L. gracilis include bonebed remains from the Hell Creek Formation of Montana and a partial skeleton from the Lance Formation of Wyoming. Together with related taxa, Leptoceratops is the eponymous genus of the family Leptoceratopsidae. Leptoceratops is known from more than ten individuals, all from Maastrichtian deposits of Alberta, Montana and Wyoming, representing the entire skeleton.

Multiple unusual features can be seen in the skeleton of Leptoceratops, which has a mixture of primitive and derived ceratopsian features and is around 2 m (6.6 ft) long. The head is very large with a strong jaw, but lacks horns and has a very reduced frill. The forelimbs and hindlimbs are robustly built, and Leptoceratops was likely bipedal when moving at speed and quadrupedal when moving slowly. The vertebrae of the tail were high-spined, though not as high as those of its relative Montanoceratops, and the pectoral and pelvis girdle bones were slender and more like earlier ceratopsians. The teeth of Leptoceratops are unique among dinosaurs, showing tooth wear in a fashion that must have been driven by mammal-like rotation of the jaw while chewing. This, along with the handling of stress in the jaws, show that Leptoceratops had an efficient bite allowing it to be adaptable to different food types, such as the angiosperms, conifers, or cycads found in its environment.

The environment inhabited by Leptoceratops was a semi-humid floodplain region with regular braided streams and small-treed forests. The climate was cool in the foothills of the mountainous cordillera, but the range of Leptoceratops also extended into coastal plains where it lived alongside much larger herbivorous dinosaurs. It is possible that within these environments, Leptoceratops dug and lived in multi-generational burrows. Leptoceratops was not a common component of the dinosaur fauna it lived in, but coexisted with various dinosaurs and other animals.

== Discovery and species ==
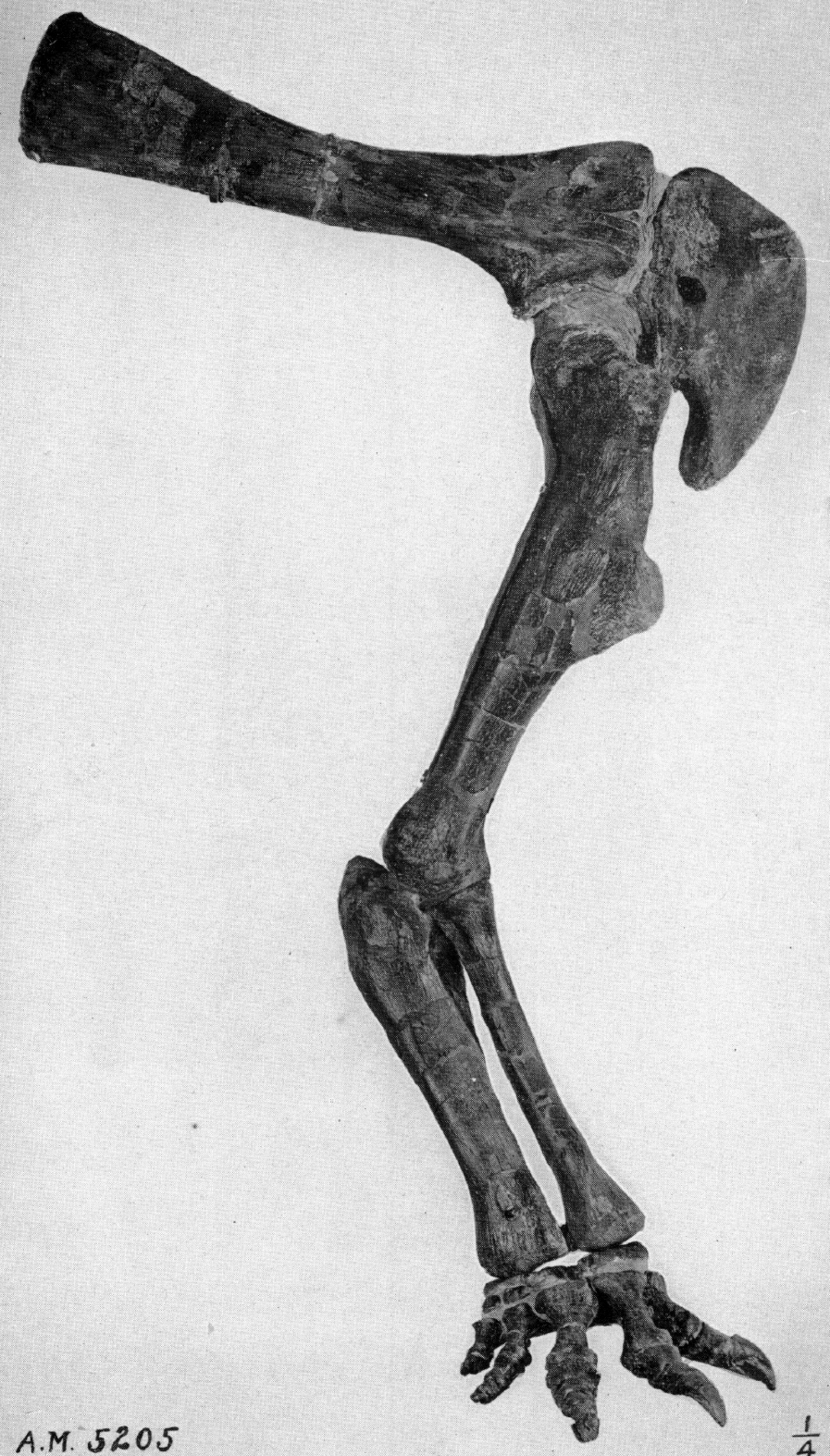
Forelimb of Leptoceratops type AMNH 5205

A 1910 expedition by the American Museum of Natural History (AMNH) discovered two ceratopsian specimens from the Maastrichtian age of the Cretaceous along the Red Deer River in Alberta, Canada. The two individuals were found together in a weathered-out cow trail that had destroyed and fragmented some of the material, so that only parts of each skeleton were recovered. One of these individuals preserves a partial skull and was designated as the holotype of the new taxon Leptoceratops gracilis when it was described in 1914 by American palaeontologist Barnum Brown. The name translates as "slender small horn face", with the generic name derived from the Ancient Greek word leptos, 'small', and Ceratops, 'horned face', though Brown did not explain its etymology. The specimen preserves parts of the skull and jaws, a complete right forelimb, partial hindlimbs, a series of 24 caudal vertebrae, as well as two other isolated vertebrae. The second individual also preserves part of the forelimb, as well as four presacral, three sacral, and one caudal vertebrae. Both individuals are catalogued under the specimen number AMNH 5205, with the second individual being slightly larger. The locality that Leptoceratops was first found in could not be relocated by Canadian palaeontologist Charles M. Sternberg, but the description of it provided by Brown was sufficient for Sternberg to conclude that it was from within the Upper Edmonton member of the Edmonton Formation. Sternberg described three additional skeletons of Leptoceratops from the Edmonton Formation in 1951, including one complete individual. The specimens were discovered towards the end of the 1947 field season, where Sternberg located a skull, jaw, and most of a skeleton of an individual (Canadian Museum of Nature number 8889), student assistant T. P. Chammery found a smaller individual missing most of the head and a partial left hand (CMN 8888), and excavation of CMN 8888 uncovered a third individual (CMN 8887) directly beside it. CMN 8888 and 8887 were 15 m (50 ft) above the base of the Upper Edmonton member, and CMN 8889 was an additional 1.5 m (5 ft) above them. These specimens were complete enough to allow Canadian palaeontologist Dale A. Russell to publish a completely reconstructed skeleton of Leptoceratops based only on the CMN individuals. Newer geology has separated the Edmonton Formation into four formations as the Edmonton Group, with Leptoceratops known from the uppermost named the Scollard Formation, which was deposited at the end of the Maastrichtian. Within the Scollard Formation, Leptoceratops was known in 2013 from nine specimens found in the lower portion, with an estimated range of 65.5-66.1 million years old (0.5 my older with recalibration). Along with the described types and CMN specimens, known Leptoceratops specimens from the Scollard also include the partial skeletons Royal Tyrrell Museum of Palaeontology 93.95.1 and 95.86.1.

In 1916, Brown collected an additional specimen, AMNH 5464, from the St. Mary River Formation of Montana. This specimen, including a well-preserved skeleton with a fragmentary skull, was prepared in 1918 at the AMNH and then mounted in 1935 to be put on display; the skull of this mount was completely modelled out of plaster. Differences in the skull from the first Leptoceratops specimens lead Brown and Erich M. Schlaijker to describe the specimen in 1942 as a new species, Leptoceratops cerorhynchus. Brown and Schlaijker concluded that Leptoceratops was a very close relative of Protoceratops, and that both genera should be united within the family Protoceratopsidae. Comparisons between the St. Mary River specimen and the skeletons collected by Sternberg in Alberta showed that L. cerorhynchus should be given its own genus, which Sternberg named Montanoceratops in 1951.

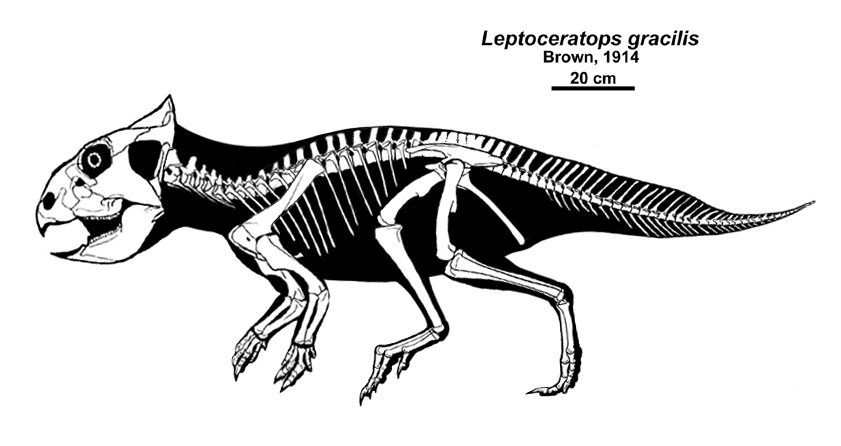
Skeletal reconstruction

American palaeontologist Charles W. Gilmore led three expeditions of the United States Geological Survey to the Two Medicine Formation of Montana in 1913, 1928 and 1935, discovering two specimens in the third expedition that he later referred to Leptoceratops. The material, which is fragmentary but clearly similar to other Leptoceratops remains, also included a complete foot for the first time, along with other elements not represented in other specimens. The older age of the Two Medicine material than that from Scollard or St. Mary River suggested that Gilmore's specimens, United States National Museum numbers 13863 and 13864, could belong to a distinct species, but the fragmentary nature meant he did not give it a name and left it as indeterminate Leptoceratops species. These specimens were later removed from Leptoceratops by Sternberg in 1951, and then later referred to its close relative Cerasinops when it was named in 2007 by American palaeontologists Brenda J. Chinnery and John R. Horner based on an 80% complete skeleton also found in the Two Medicine Formation.

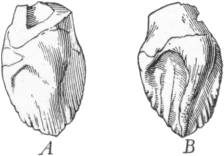
Isolated maxillary tooth of AMNH 5205

A Leptoceratops locality was found in 1962 within the Lance Formation of Wyoming by Michael Ramus, where a single individual was collected. This specimen, Princeton University (now Yale Peabody Museum) number 18133, preserves a nearly complete hindlimb, pelvis, and tail alongside some isolated teeth. Described in 1978 by American palaeontologist John Ostrom, the skeleton is very similar to the material assigned to Leptoceratops from Alberta, while also displaying differences to both Montanoceratops and other former Leptoceratops material from Montana. An isolated tooth (AMNH 2571) from the Pinyon Conglomerate of Teton County, Wyoming was also referred to Leptoceratops, but not L. gracilis, by Ostrom. The assignment of YPM VPPU 018133 to Leptoceratops was questioned by Chinnery in 2004, as the jugal is similar to that described for Prenoceratops and the locality may be part of the Meeteetse Formation instead.

Leptoceratops was first found in the Hell Creek Formation of Montana, equivalent in age to the Scollard and Lance Formations of Alberta and Wyoming, in 1992 with the discovery of a rear part of a skull by Brig Konecke. The skull, University of Wisconsin-Madison Geology Museum number 200, was prepared in 1998 and shows the first complete braincase yet described. An isolated tooth, UWGM-201, was also found. UWGM-200 was found within a 1 m (3.3 ft) thick cross-bedded sandstone containing unionid bivalve shells from the upper Hell Creek, and UWGM-201 was found 75 m (246 ft) below the Cretaceous-Paleogene boundary in the middle Hell Creek.

An isolated dentary of a protoceratopsian, TMP 95.12.6, was found in 1995 by Canadian palaeontologist Philip J. Currie in the middle Dinosaur Park Formation of Alberta, which is middle Campanian in age. It was first described as Leptoceratops sp. by Michael J. Ryan and Currie in 1998 despite being substantially older than other Leptoceratops material then known, as the only other North American protoceratopsian named, Montanoceratops, showed clear differences in anatomy from the Dinosaur Park specimen. Additional descriptions of other new leptoceratopsids following 1998 led Ryan, Currie and colleagues to redescribe TMP 95.12.6 in 2012 as the new taxon Unescoceratops.

== Description ==
Size of Leptoceratops

Leptoceratops was an unusual early ceratopsian, displaying a very large head but minimal frill, a more forwards center of mass suggesting quadrupedality, and a higher number of vertebrae in front of the pelvis. All the described specimens of Leptoceratops are of a similar size, but the type (AMNH 5205) and one referred specimen (YPM VPPU 18133) appear to be larger than the three CMN specimens, with CMN 8887 being the smallest. The complete skeleton of CMN 8889, with the tail of CMN 8887 added and scaled up to match the other bones, measures 1.81 m (5.9 ft) in length. The largest individuals of Leptoceratops were likely around 2 m (6.6 ft) long and weighed 100 kg (220 lb). This is similar in size to some other early ceratopsians like Cerasinops, Zhuchengceratops, Prenoceratops, Montanoceratops and Protoceratops, but smaller than the large Udanoceratops which was around 4 m (13 ft) long and 700 kg (1,500 lb).

=== Skull ===
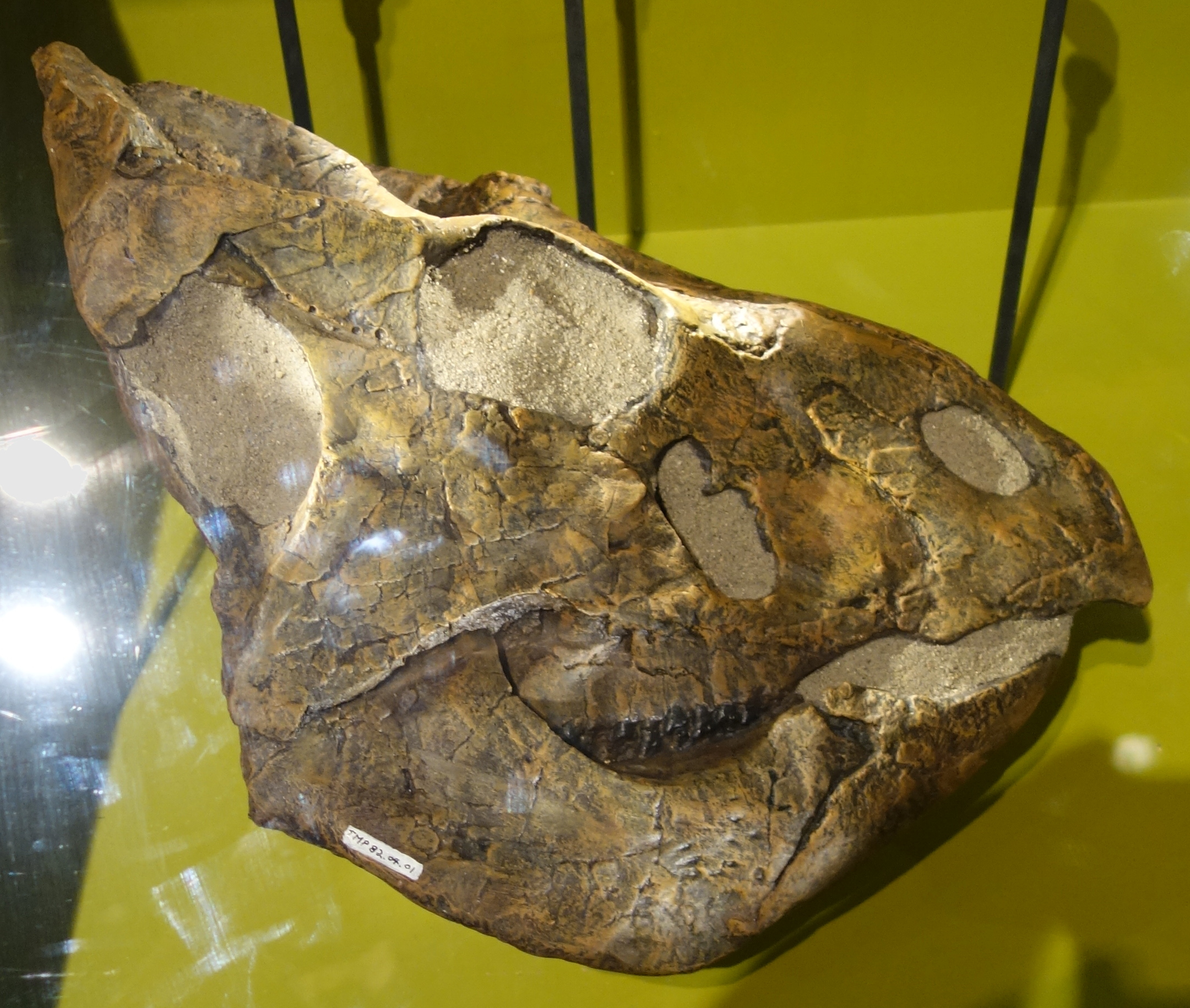
Skull cast of CMN 8887

The skull of Leptoceratops is similar to Protoceratops in general form, but is lower and longer and uniquely lacks a crest at the back of the skull to make a prominent frill. The complete skulls known range from 450 mm (18 in) long in CMN 8889 to 330 mm (13 in) long in CMN 8887, with respective mandibles 345 mm (13.6 in) and 275 mm (10.8 in) long. Extrapolating the complete CMN skulls to the preserved material of AMNH 5205 and UWGM-200 gives lengths of 529 mm (20.8 in) and 468–540 mm (18.4–21.3 in) respectively. The skull bones of CMN 8889 are fused suggesting it is an adult, while those of CMN 8887 and UWGM-200 are unfused indicating they may not yet be fully grown. There is no horn on the nasal unlike more derived ceratopsians, nor on the postorbital. Unlike Protoceratops there are no teeth in the premarillary bone of the snout, though there are 17 teeth in both the maxilla and dentary. There is a large ridge above the teeth on the maxilla, which would have supported a large muscled cheek pouch to assist in shredding large amounts of vegetation. As in other ceratopsians, the jugal bones of the cheek are flared to the side and are capped by an ossification, the epijugal, which is unique for the group. The palpebral bone, which forms an eyebrow in ornithischians, is only small and loosely positioned within the eye socket. The parietal bones of the rear skull, which in Protoceratops are elongated to form a frill and bear fenestrae, are reduced and solid in Leptoceratops. The anatomy of the braincase of Leptoceratops is similar to that of Montanoceratops with minor differences, including a restricted neck to the occipital condyle, an unsplit ridge on the supraoccipital, and an elevated articulation for the palate on the exoccipital. The cranial nerves of Leptoceratops have the same arrangement patterns as those of Montanoceratops, Triceratops and Chasmosaurus mariscalensis. Hyoid bones are known in Leptoceratops, only otherwise preserved in specimens of Centrosaurus and Protoceratops among ceratopsians.

The mandible of CMN 8889 is well preserved and has been separated from the rest of the skull by the removal of matrix during preparation so its anatomy can be more easily seen. The predentary, which forms a lower beak, is shorter than in any more advanced ceratopsian, though the union with the dentary is strong. The dentary is short and deep in Leptoceratops, similar to Protoceratops and most other leptoceratopsids except for Montanoceratops, in which it is longer and straighter. There is a smooth beveling on the dentary to form the matching surface of the cheek to the maxilla above. When articulated, the mandibles of Leptoceratops are similar to other basal neoceratopsians in being very wide with a lowered articular surface for the skull, reflective of different feeding adaptations during the evolution of ceratopsians where the closing of the jaws brings all the teeth into contact at the same time. The teeth in Leptoceratops are some of the most distinct in Ceratopsia, showing a unique type of tooth-on-tooth wear only shared with taxa such as Udanoceratops and Archaeoceratops. Leptoceratops teeth are also the largest in absolute size of any ceratopsian with single-rooted teeth; the tooth roots of ceratopsids are split to be double-rooted. The facet formed by tooth wear is nearly or fully vertical in the teeth of Leptoceratops, but only extends partway down the tooth so that there is a sharp and distinct shelf. The unworn surface of teeth of Leptoceratops shows a strong ridge down along the crown, which is slightly offset from central and often follows a curved path. Two to three weaker ridges are present parallel to that primary ridge in the teeth, with the entire ornamented region of the crown surrounded by a strong ridge called the cingulum. Dental enamel is present on both sides of the crown.

=== Postcranial skeleton ===
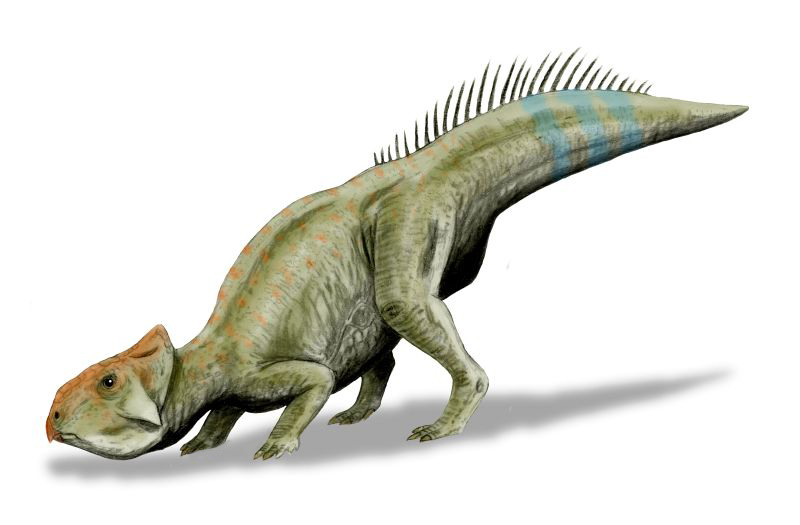
Life restoration

The entire skeleton of Leptoceratops is known thanks to the preservation of multiple specimens. Complete vertebral columns of CMN 8888 and 8887 are 1.66 m (5.4 ft) and 1.35 m (4.4 ft) long respectively, with nine cervical vertebrae, thirteen dorsal vertebrae, and six vertebrae in the sacrum. The number of caudal vertebrae varies, with 38 in CMN 8887, 48 in CMN 8888, and 48 or 49 in YPM VPPU 18133. The first three cervicals are not fused together into a syncervical until adulthood, which is distinctly more primitive than Protoceratops and ceratopsids. Neural spines in cervical vertebrae are more slender and longer in Leptoceratops than Protoceratops, but the vertebrae are otherwise similar. The dorsal vertebrae of Leptoceratops are more distinct, as the neural spines are far more slanted and, together with the zygapophyses, overhanging the centrum. The rib articulations are also longer than in Protoceratops. The number of fused sacral vertebrae is variable between individuals, but there are six sacral vertebrae based on the anatomy of rib articulations of the last dorsal and first caudal. The neural spines of the caudal vertebrae are very elongate, reaching two to four times the height of the centrum; when Leptoceratops was first described, they were the longest of any ceratopsian known at that time. However, the neural spines of the more recently discovered Montanoceratops exceed five to eight times their centrum height. Neural spines are present on all but the last five caudals, and are increasingly sloped towards the end of the tail. The number of caudal ribs varies between specimens, with ribs persisting to the 18th caudal in the CMN specimens, but only as far as the seventh caudal in YPM VPPU 18133. All vertebral bodies but the last eight are taller than long.

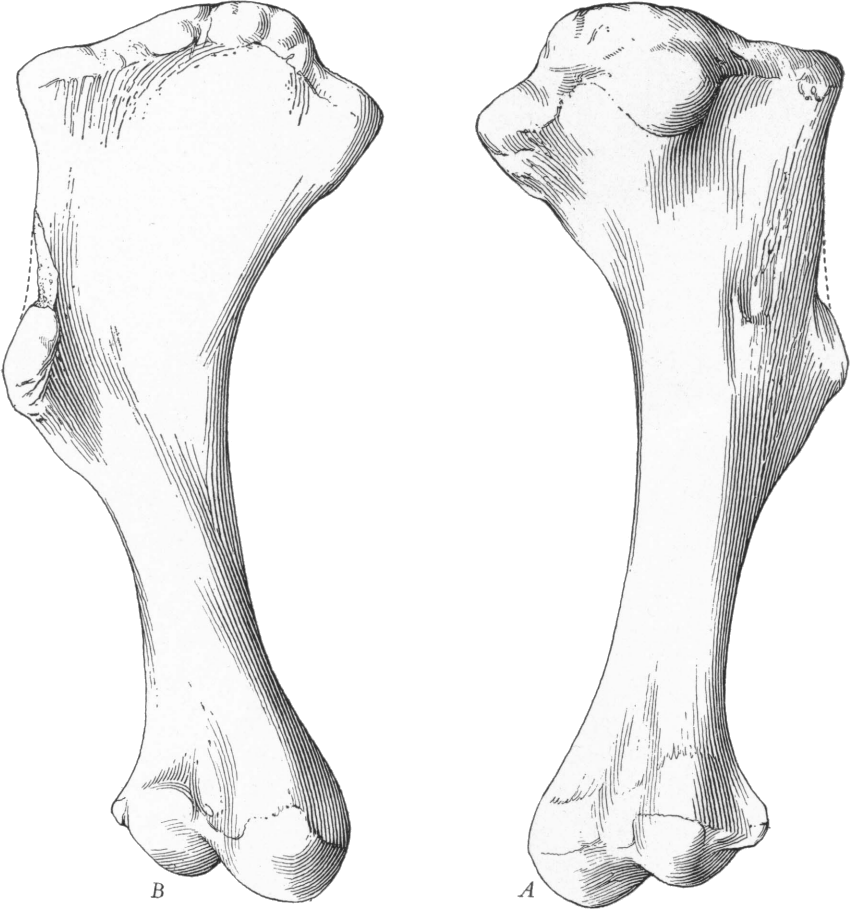
Humerus of AMNH 5205

Sternal plates and clavicles of the pectoral region are known in Leptoceratops; the sternals are comparable to those of Centrosaurus and Chasmosaurus in shape, but clavicles are absent in ceratopsids and non-ceratopsian ornithischians. The remainder of the forelimb is similar to other ceratopsians in general anatomy, showing similar areas for muscle attachment despite differences in bone form. The scapula is more slender than in ceratopsids but similar to Protoceratops while lacking the ridge that extends diagonally across the scapular blade found in the other genera. The humerus, radius, and ulna are intermediate between Protoceratops, where they are more slender, and ceratopsids, where they are more robust. The humeri, 290 mm (11 in) long in AMNH 5205, 242 mm (9.5 in) long in CMN 8889, 255 mm (10.0 in) long in CMN 8888, and 185 mm (7.3 in) long in CMN 8887, are shorter proportionally and more robust than in Protoceratops. The radius of Leptoceratops is far more similar to ceratopsids, differing very little from Triceratops in form and strength of the ridge along its length. The hand is complete, displaying two rows of carpals, and three digits with hooves on the first three. The two proximal carpals, the ulnare and radiale, which articulate with the ulna and radius, respectively, are large, while the three distal carpals are small and irregular. The metacarpals are more compact than those of Triceratops, but show the ability for free movement of the fingers, unlike in ceratopsids. The manus has a phalangeal formula of 2-3-4-3-1.

The ilium of Leptoceratops is primitive for a ceratopsian, being similar to Protoceratops but thinner and without any expansion of its margin found in later ceratopsians. The anterior process of the ilium does not curve substantially and is unexpanded, and the posterior process narrows gradually, being much narrower than that of Montanoceratops. The pubis is similar but proportionally smaller than in Protoceratops, with a short and narrow anterior process and a curved and tapered posterior process that is only 50 mm (2.0 in) in length. The ischium is also similar to that of Protoceratops, but does not show any expansion towards its end or internal groove near the base. The ischia show a pronounced curvature along their length and are more slender than in Montanoceratops. As with the forelimb, the hindlimb is more robust than in Protoceratops, though the structure of the foot is equally primitive. The femur, which is 270 mm (11 in) long in CMN 8889, 265 mm (10.4 in) long in CMN 8888, 230 mm (9.1 in) long in CMN 8887, and over 257 mm (10.1 in) long in YPM VPPU 18133, is always slightly shorter than the tibia, which is unlike the heavier ceratopsids. The trochanters for muscle articulations are pronounced. There are two distal tarsals in Leptoceratops, one capping the third metatarsal and one capping the fourth. Overall the foot is longer proportionally than in Protoceratops. The first four digits are fully developed and bear claws, with the first being slightly outturned from the rest, while the fifth digit is reduced to just a splint-like metatarsal. The third metatarsal is the longest, followed by the second, fourth, and first, and the pes has a phalangeal formula of 2-3-4-5-0.

== Classification ==
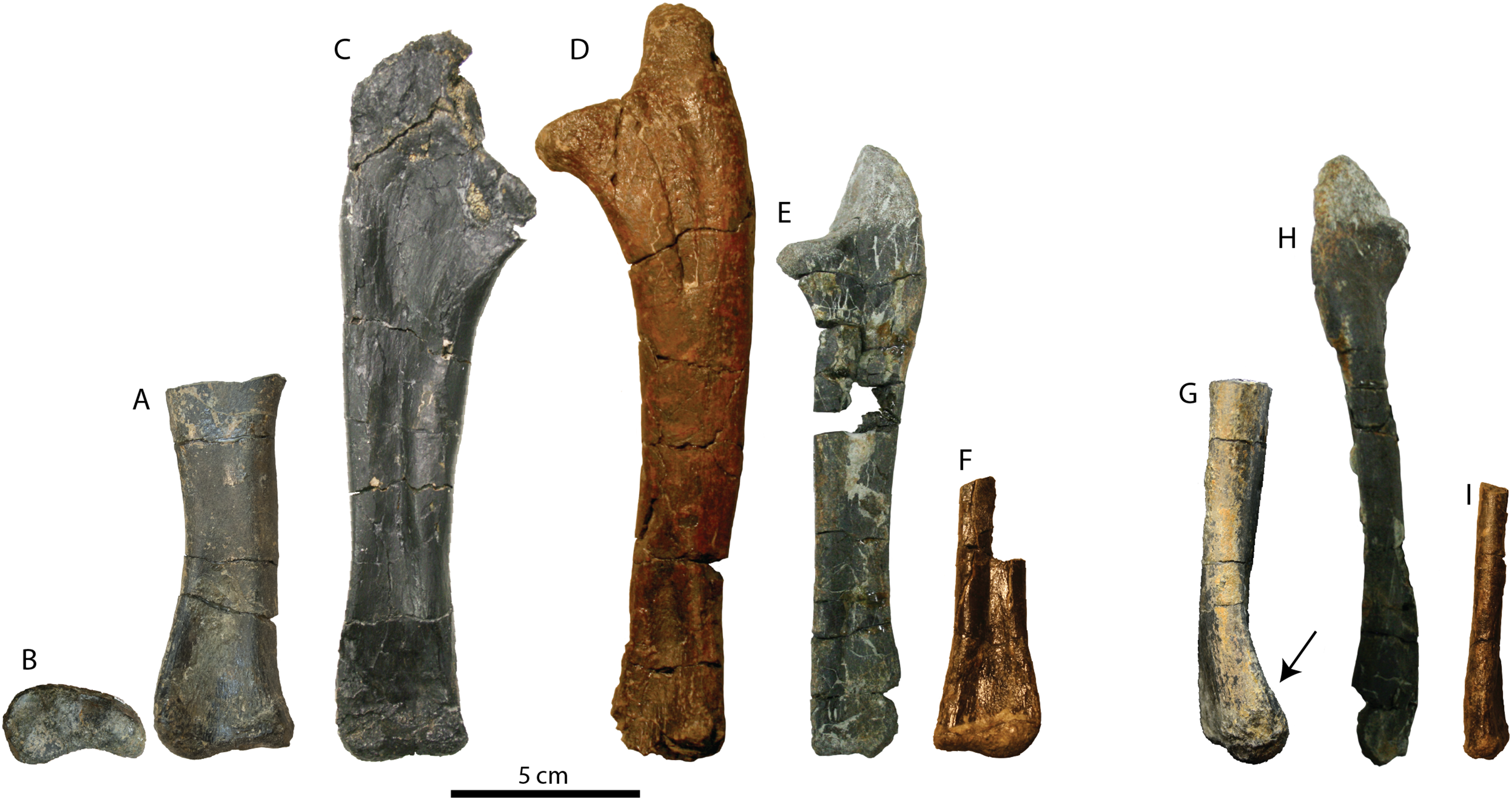
Ulnae of Leptoceratops (C) and other leptoceratopsids

Leptoceratops was first named as a primitive member of Ceratopsia outside the family Ceratopsidae, with Brown suggesting that it and Brachyceratops may form their own family. This was not followed by Hungarian palaeontologist Franz Nopcsa, who instead placed Leptoceratops within Ceratopsidae and in its own subfamily, Leptoceratopsinae; this subfamily also contained Protoceratops but not Brachyceratops. A similar classification was supported by American palaeontologist Alfred Romer, who placed Leptoceratops within the new family Leptoceratopsidae in 1927, which, together with Ceratopsidae and Protoceratopsidae, formed the group Ceratopsia. The description of new material of Leptoceratops highlighted its similarity to Protoceratops, and as a result, the two genera, as well as Montanoceratops after its separation, were included within Protoceratopsidae.

Recognition that Leptoceratops and other early ceratopsians were not all united within Protoceratopsidae began with the descriptions of new genera from Asia since 1975 and the introduction of phylogenetics to ceratopsian classification. American palaeontologist Paul C. Sereno suggested in 1986 that Protoceratopsidae as traditionally used is paraphyletic, instead forming a successive acquisition of features closer to Ceratopsidae. This was supported by multiple phylogenetic analyses, where Leptoceratops was either unrelated to other forms, within Protoceratopsidae, or outside Protoceratopsidae but forming a clade with taxa like Montanoceratops, Udanoceratops, or Asiaceratops. The latter hypothesis gained support as studies progressed, with the name Leptoceratopsidae adopted for the group, which soon included a diverse variety of early ceratopsians from the Late Cretaceous, including both existing and newly described genera.

All previously published neoceratopsian phylogenetic analyses were incorporated into the analysis of Eric M. Morschhauser and colleagues in 2019, along with all previously published diagnostic species excluding the incomplete juvenile Archaeoceratops yujingziensis and the problematic genera Bainoceratops, Lamaceratops, Platyceratops and Gobiceratops that are very closely related to and potentially synonymous with Bagaceratops. While there were many unresolved areas of the strict consensus, including all of Leptoceratopsidae, a single most parsimonious tree was found that was most consistent with the relative ages of the taxa included, which is shown below. Further phylogenetic analysis added the new leptoceratopsid taxa Ferrisaurus and Gremlin, but the inclusion of these taxa and the fragmentary nature of many early ceratopsians resulted in a lack of resolution of leptoceratopsid relationships.

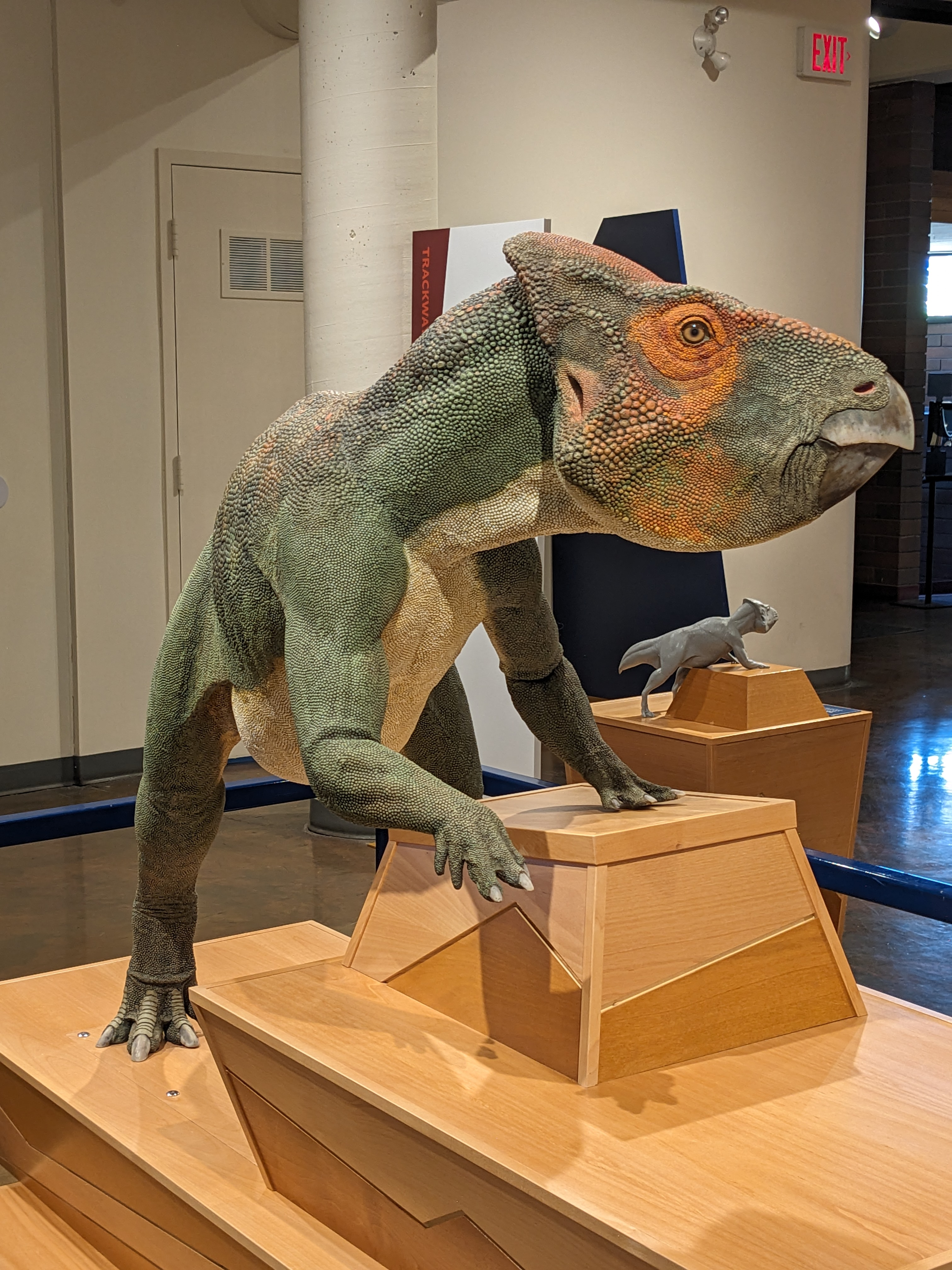
Life-sized model of the related leptoceratopsid Ferrisaurus

- Leptoceratopsidae
  - Helioceratops brachygnathus
  - - Leptoceratops gracilis
    - - - Ischioceratops zhuchengensis
        - - Prenoceratops pieganensis
          - - Udanoceratops tchizhovi
            - Zhuchengceratops inexpectus
      - - Koreaceratops hwaseongensis
        - - Montanoceratops cerorhynchus
          - - Cerasinops hodgskissi
            - - Gryphoceratops morrisoni
              - Unescoceratops kopelhusae

== Palaeobiology ==
=== Behaviour ===
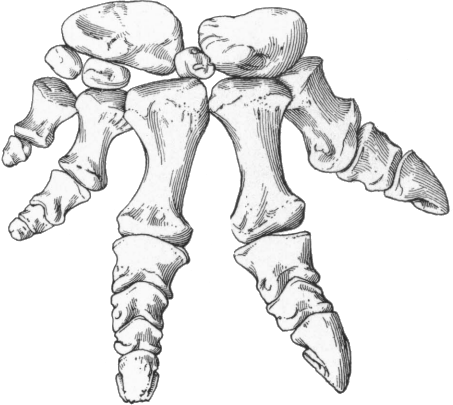
Complete hand of AMNH 5205

The early evolution of ceratopsians saw a transition from the primitive bipedality to quadrupedality. Traditionally, Leptoceratops has been assumed to be quadrupedal. The first investigation specifically into the function of the neoceratopsian forelimb was published by Phil Senter in 2007, who looked at Psittacosaurus, Leptoceratops and Protoceratops. The forelimbs of Leptoceratops are long enough to reach the ground upright, allowing for quadrupedality. While in Protoceratops the radius could rotate around the forearm to allow pronation of the hand, this is not possible in Leptoceratops, limiting quadrupedal posture to when the hands spread to the sides. The forelimb would be held upright with the elbow flexed and the thumb and second finger pointing forwards while the other digits splayed to the side, although a more lateral sprawl was possible. Leptoceratops lacks opposable digits to allow for one-handed prehension, but would have been able to hold with two hands when moving bipedally. Proportions of the fore and hindlimbs suggest that both Leptoceratops and Protoceratops could have been bipedal when moving at high speeds but reverted to quadrupedality when moving slowly, with Leptoceratops tending to be slightly more bipedal than Protoceratops.

Scratch-digging is also believed to have been possible in Leptoceratops based on its forelimb anatomy, which is supported by fossils from the Hell Creek Formation suggesting burrowing. Three fossil bonebeds were discovered in the Hell Creek Formation containing large amounts of Leptoceratops specimens of various ages. Originally believed to represent a miring event, Denver Fowler and colleagues presented in 2019 the belief that the sites instead represent adults buried during burrow collapses in a multi-generational burrow. All three bonebeds are from the lower third of Hell Creek, where the environment was better-drained than the swampy upper Hell Creek, which lacks Leptoceratops.

The syncervical of Leptoceratops, which is also shared with most other neoceratopsians more derived than Auroraceratops, is formed by the fusion of the first three cervical vertebrae and the first two intercentra. The evolution of the syncervical in small-bodied neoceratopsians shows that it was likely not an adaptation for a large head or intraspecific combat. Most modern animals with syncervicals, ranging from two vertebrae in hornbills, porcupines and dolphins to seven vertebrae in Risso's dolphin, are most often fossorial diggers or pelagic. Fossorial behaviour has been hypothesised in small ceratopsians including Leptoceratops, but further evidence is needed to understand the origins of the syncervicals of ceratopsians.

=== Feeding and diet ===
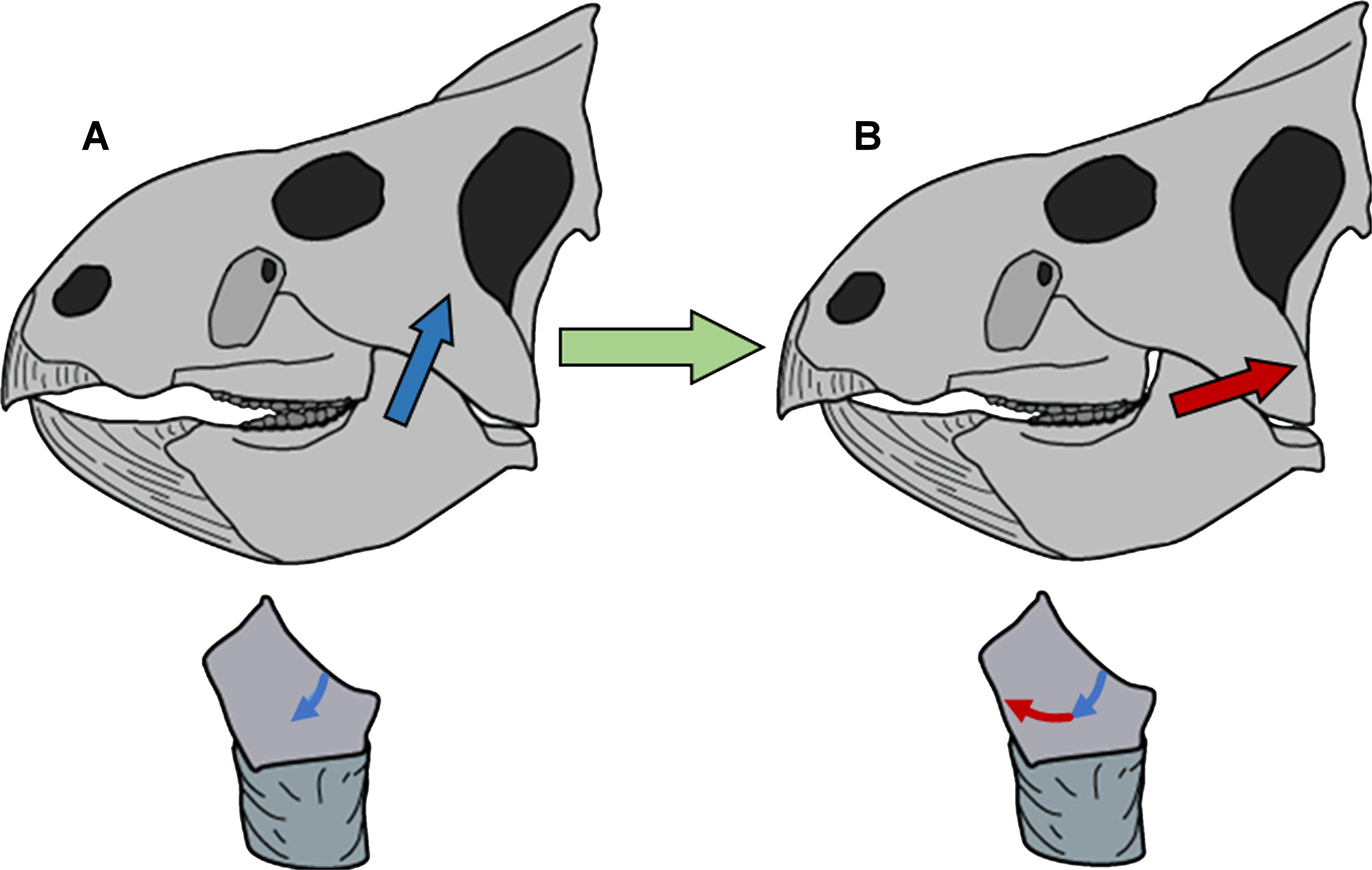
Jaw motion during chewing in Leptoceratops

Leptoceratops, like other ceratopsians, would have been a herbivore. Nutritious angiosperms were not widespread in the Early Cretaceous, and despite their taxonomic diversity by the end of the Cretaceous they might not have been abundant, with conifers and ferns comprising most of the vegetation. The foliage of Equisetum provides large amounts of energy, Ginkgo contains high protein, and cycads and palms may have provided starch. Basal ceratopsians were obligate low browsers due to their smaller size, though large basal neoceratopsians could have consumed seeds and fruits not available to their smaller counterparts. Ceratopsids have been found with cycad material in their teeth, showing that they did consume the plants, and large neoceratopsians could have used their strong bites to consume them as well.

The unique wear pattern on teeth of Leptoceratops is inconsistent with the standard chewing of neoceratopsians, indicating that the bite included an arcing path to create the curved tooth wear seen. The consistency of tooth wear shows that a powerful chewing stroke was used, with the power initiated by the same jaw adductor muscles as in other ceratopsians, but with a smooth transition of power between the external and posterior adductor muscles, which was given the name circumpalinal by Frank Varriale in 2016 when he described the jaw motion of Leptoceratops. The mastication of Leptoceratops is different from all other dinosaurs, with the jaw undergoing an orbital motion that is mammal-like, despite the very large differences in jaw joint anatomy between Leptoceratops and analogous mammals. Biomechanical studies of the jaws of ceratopsians have also identified that Leptoceratops, as well as other leptoceratopsids, had efficient bites allowing them to be adaptable to different food types, not simply showing improvements along the evolution of ceratopsids.

== Palaeoecology ==
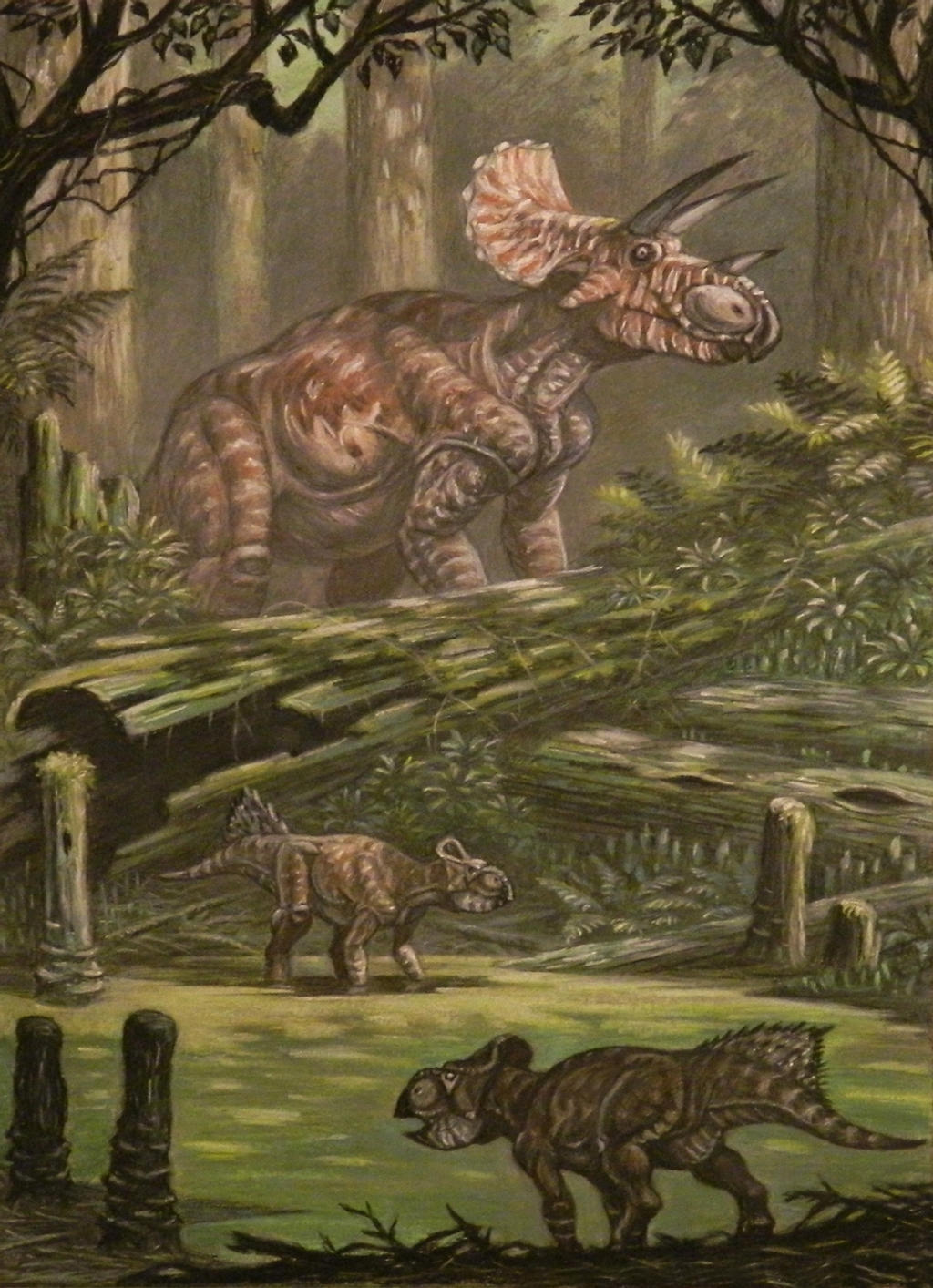
Triceratops and Leptoceratops in the Hell Creek environment

Leptoceratops has been used as an indicator of faunal provinciality during the late Maastrichtian of North America, with Thomas Lehman identifying the "Leptoceratops fauna" in the Scollard, Lance and Pinyon Canyon Formations of Alberta and Wyoming, where Leptoceratops occurs, along with Triceratops and Tyrannosaurus, but Edmontosaurus and Alamosaurus are absent. Lehman first separated the fauna including Leptoceratops from the other Triceratops-bearing locations in 1987, identifying that while Triceratops overlaps in range with Leptoceratops, where the latter is found the former is less abundant than elsewhere. The sediments of these regions were alluvial plain and foothill, with the Leptoceratops fauna consequently inhabiting cool environments flanking the mountainous cordillera. However, Leptoceratops has since been found within the Hell Creek Formation that is part of the Triceratops/Edmontosaurus fauna, and its extremely small sample size of specimens (6% of the Scollard dinosaur fauna) instead preclude Leptoceratops from being a suitable diagnostic animal for a faunal province. With the Triceratops/Edmontosaurus fauna being from coastal plains, Leptoceratops is not as ecologically restricted as previously thought.

The Scollard Formation from which Leptoceratops is known was deposited from 66.88 million years ago until the end of the Maastrichtian and Cretaceous at 66.043 mya, with differences in sediment deposits suggesting that the lower Scollard Formation (Cretaceous deposits) lasted around 0.68 million years and the upper 0.16. The assemblage including Leptoceratops, Triceratops, and the ankylosaur Ankylosaurus is from the lower Scollard, while the large theropod Tyrannosaurus is from the upper. The Hell Creek Formation in contrast lasts from earlier in the Maastrichtian, approximately 67.20 mya, to the end. Middle and lower sections of Hell Creek would be older than the entire Scollard Formation and instead be equivalent to the underlying Battle Formation of southern Alberta.

Palaeoenvironments of the Scollard and Hell Creek formation show that the very end of the Cretaceous was intermediate between semi-arid and humid, with both formations showing braided streams and floodplains and meandering channels, that shifted to become more humid and wetland following the Cretaceous-Paleogene boundary. The formations where Leptoceratops fossils have been found represent different sections of the western shore of the Western Interior Seaway dividing western and eastern North America during the Cretaceous, a broad coastal plain extending westward from the seaway to the newly formed Rocky Mountains. These formations are composed largely of sandstone and mudstone, which have been attributed to floodplain environments. While slightly older floras were codominated by cycad-palm-fern meadows, by the time of the Hell Creek angiosperms were dominant in a forested landscape of small trees. Many fossil vertebrates are found in the Scollard Formation alongside Leptoceratops, including Chondrichthyes and Osteichthyes such as Palaeospinax, Myledaphus, Lepisosteus and Cyclurus, amphibians like Scapherpeton, turtles including Compsemys, indeterminate champsosaurs, crocodilians, pterosaurs and birds, a variety of theropod groups including troodontids, ornithomimids, the tyrannosaurid Tyrannosaurus, and ornithischians including Thescelosaurus, pachycephalosaurids, Triceratops and Ankylosaurus. Mammals are also very diverse, with multituberculates, deltatheridiids, the marsupials Alphadon, Pediomys, Didelphodon and Eodelphis, and the insectivorans Gypsonictops, Cimolestes and Batodon. Within the Hell Creek Formation of Montana, Leptoceratops lived alongside dinosaurs including the ceratopsids Torosaurus and Triceratops, the hadrosaurid Edmontosaurus, the parksosaurid Thescelosaurus, the ankylosaurs Ankylosaurus and Denversaurus, the pachycephalosaurs Pachycephalosaurus, Platytholus and Sphaerotholus, the paravian theropods Acheroraptor and Pectinodon, the other coelurosaurian theropods Tyrannosaurus, Anzu, Eoneophron, Trierarchuncus and indeterminate ornithomimids, and the pterosaur Infernodrakon.
