= Whitemud Formation =

Geologic formation of Late Cretaceous age in the Western Canada Sedimentary Basin

- Stratigraphic range: Maastrichtian
- Type: Geological formation
- Unit of: Edmonton Group
- Underlies: Frenchman Formation and Battle Formation
- Overlies: Eastend Formation, Horseshoe Canyon Formation and St. Mary River Formation
- Thickness: Up to 23 metres (75 ft)

Lithology
- Primary: Sandstone, siltstone, clay
- Other: Shale, lignite

Location
- Region: Saskatchewan, Alberta
- Country: Canada

Type section
- Named by: N.B. Davis, 1918

The Whitemud Formation is a geologic formation of Late Cretaceous (Maastrichtian) age in the Western Canada Sedimentary Basin. it is present through the plains of southern Saskatchewan, southeastern Alberta and south-central Alberta. Named by N.B. Davis in 1918, the formation is characterized by white kaolinitic clay and is a source of high-quality refractory clay. The type locality has been designated as Dempster's clay pit northwest of Eastend, Saskatchewan.

Although fossils are generally lacking in the Whitemud Formation, in southern Saskatchewan the Whitemud contains coprolites (fossilized feces) and fossilized intestines of fish.

== Lithology ==
In most areas the formation can be subdivided into three units:

- Lower: Medium-grained arkosic and kaolinitic sandstones with trough cross-bedding
- Middle: Brown fissile carbonaceous shales and siltstones, with thin lignite beds
- Upper: Clays and siltstones, with some thinner, tabular units of simple and planar cross-bedded kaolinitic sandstones

In southwestern Alberta around the Red Deer and Oldman Rivers, the middle carbonaceous shale unit is absent and the formation consists of white-weathering, cross-bedded kaolinitic sandstones interbedded with white- to cream-weathering silty and sandy clay.

== Environment of deposition ==
Sedimentology and fossils indicate that the Whitemud sediments accumulated in river channels, low-gradient streams, and shallow lakes and ponds on a low-lying coastal plain. Its kaolinite was produced by intense chemical weathering that altered the original feldspar content to kaolinite during and after deposition.

== Economic resources ==
Kaolinite-rich clays have been quarried from the Whitemud Formation since before 1920 and are used in the manufacture of stoneware products ranging from pottery to sewer pipes.

== Paleontology ==
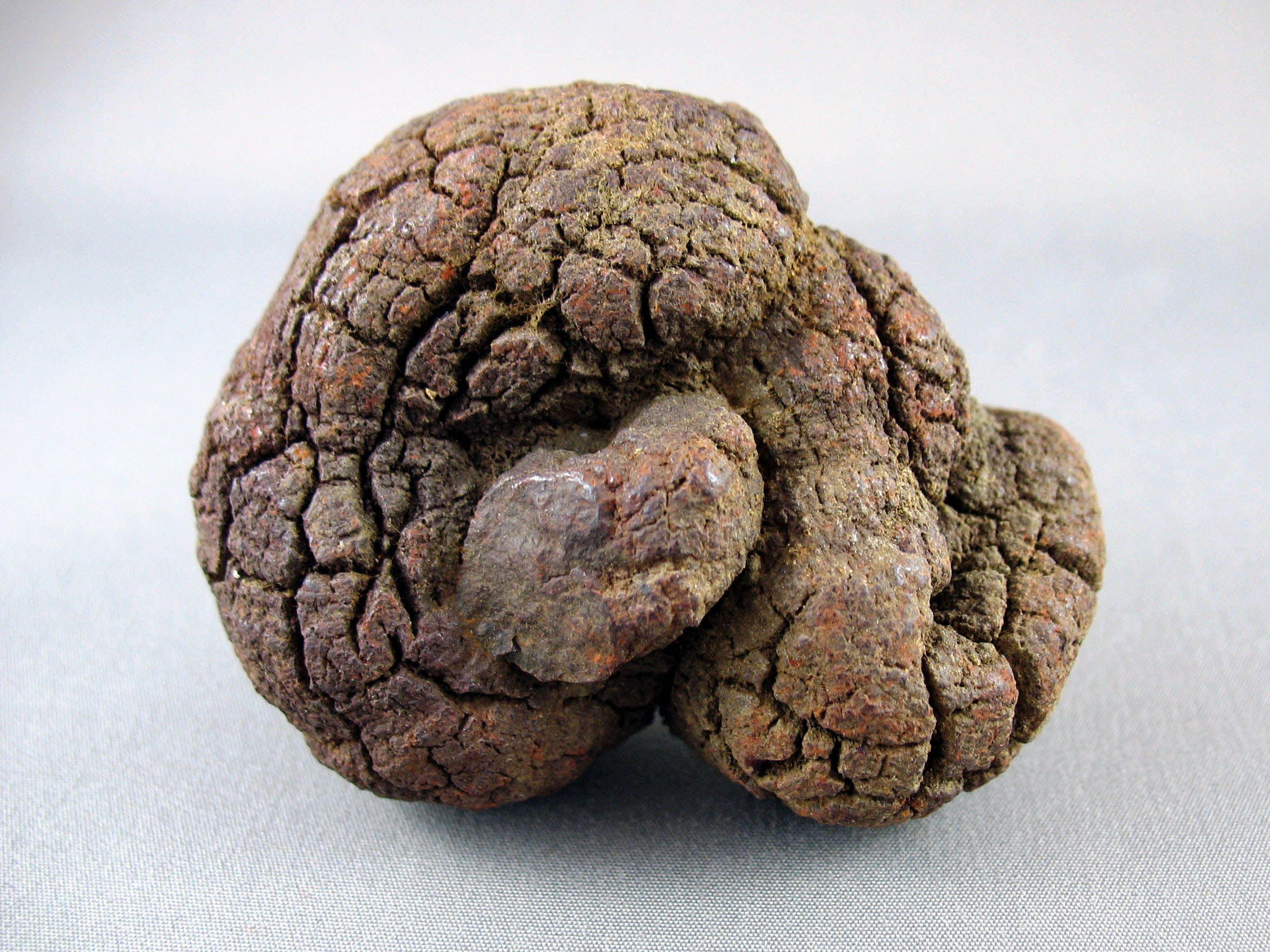
Coprolite from the Whitemud Formation in southern Saskatchewan

Plant fossils and palynomorphs found in the carbonaceous shales indicate the presence of aquatic plants such as water lilies, as well as trees and shrubs related to figs, hickories and redwoods.

Coprolites provide the only evidence of vertebrates. In southern Saskatchewan the formation contains scattered coprolites that represent feces of fish, most probably sturgeons. The feces have been preserved due to the replacement of the original fecal material by goethite, siderite and other iron minerals. They typically range in length from about 2 to 10 cm (1 to 4 in), although specimens as long as 23 cm (9 in) have been reported. A variety of coiled and uncoiled morphologies have been described, and some spiral forms with intricate systems of internal folds are thought to represent fossilized intestines containing feces that were unexpelled when the fishes died.

== Relationship to other units ==
The Whitemud Formation is part of the Edmonton Group. It rests conformably on the Eastend Formation in Saskatchewan and in the Cypress Hills area; on the Horseshoe Canyon Formation in the Drumheller area; and on the St. Mary River Formation in the Oldman River area. In southeastern Saskatchewan it is unconformably overlain by the Frenchman Formation; and in all other areas it is conformably overlain by the Battle Formation.
