= Eastend Formation =

Stratigraphical unit of Maastrichtian age in the Western Canadian Sedimentary Basin

- Stratigraphic range: Maastrichtian
- Type: Geological formation
- Underlies: Frenchman Formation; Whitemud Formation
- Overlies: Bearpaw Formation
- Thickness: up to 30 metres (100 ft)

Lithology
- Primary: Sandstone
- Other: Shale

Location
- Coordinates: 49.50461°N 108.83756°W
- Region: WCSB
- Country: Canada

Type section
- Named for: Eastend, Saskatchewan
- Named by: L.S. Russell, 1932

The Eastend Formation is a stratigraphic unit of Maastrichtian age in the Western Canadian Sedimentary Basin. It takes its name from the town of Eastend, Saskatchewan, and was first described in outcrop around the settlement by L.S. Russell in 1932. The type locality was later defined south-west of the town by W.O. Kupsch in 1956.

== Lithology ==
The Eastend Formation is composed lithic sandstone with volcanic grains, concretionary layers and green-grey shale beds. Coal beds are found in southern Alberta.

== Distribution ==
The Eastend Formation reaches a thickness of 30 metres (100 ft) near the town of Eastend. It is eroded to the north and east, where the Frenchman Formation lies directly over the Bearpaw Formation.

== Relationship to other units ==
The Eastend Formation is conformably overlain by the Whitemud Formation and gradually overlies the Bearpaw Formation. In the Frenchman River valley, the Eastend Formation is erosionally overlain by the Frenchman Formation.

It is equivalent to St. Mary River Formation and Horseshoe Canyon Formation in southern Alberta, as well as the Fox Hills Formation in Montana and North Dakota.
