= Frenchman Formation =

Stratigraphic unit of Late Cretaceous age in the Western Canada Sedimentary Basin

- Stratigraphic range: Upper Cretaceous
- Type: Geological formation
- Underlies: Ravenscrag Formation
- Overlies: Battle Formation, Whitemud Formation, Eastend Formation, Bearpaw Formation
- Thickness: up to 113 meters (371 ft)

Lithology
- Primary: Sandstone
- Other: Claystone, conglomerate

Location
- Coordinates: 49.49073°N 108.90467°W
- Region: Western Canada Sedimentary Basin: Alberta; Saskatchewan
- Country: Canada

Type section
- Named for: Frenchman River
- Named by: Furnival, 1942

The Frenchman Formation is a stratigraphic unit of Late Cretaceous (late Maastrichtian) age in the Western Canada Sedimentary Basin. It is present in southern Saskatchewan and the Cypress Hills of southeastern Alberta. The formation was defined by G.M. Furnival in 1942 from observations of outcrops along the Frenchman River, between Ravenscrag and Highway 37. It contains the youngest of dinosaur genera, much like the Hell Creek Formation in the United States.

== Lithology ==
The Frenchman Formation consists of olive-green to brown, fine- to coarse-grained, cross-bedded sandstone with interbedded claystone bands and minor beds and lenses of intraformational clay-clast conglomerate. A conglomerate layer with well-rounded quartzite pebbles is present above the basal unconformity in some areas.

== Thickness and distribution ==
The Frenchman Formation is present in southwestern Saskatchewan and the Cypress Hills area of southeastern Alberta. Its maximum reported thickness is about 113 m.

== Age ==
The Frenchman Formation is of latest Maastrichtian age, and the top of the formation coincides with the Cretaceous-Paleogene boundary, as evidenced by biostratigraphic changes and, in some areas, the presence of the terminal Cretaceous iridium anomaly.

== Relationship to other units ==
Although some early workers included the Frenchman Formation in the overlying Ravenscrag Formation, the two are separated by the Cretaceous-Paleogene boundary and are now treated separately. The contact is abrupt but conformable, and occurs at the base of the No. 1 or Ferris coal seam of the Ravenscrag Formation.

The Frenchman is separated from the underlying formations by an erosional unconformity, and depending on the depth of the erosion, the Frenchman rests on the Whitemud Formation, the Battle Formation, the Eastend Formation, or the Bearpaw Formation. It is equivalent in age to the lower part of the Scollard Formation, the lower part of the Willow Creek Formation, the lower part of the Coalspur Formation in Alberta, and the Hell Creek Formation in Montana and North Dakota.

== Paleontology ==
=== Mammals and birds ===
J.E. Storer described fossil mammals from the Gryde locality in the Frenchman Formation, including Parectypodus and Alphadon. A bone (the humeral end of the left coracoid) of a bird attributed to the genus Cimolopteryx has also been described from the Gryde locality.

=== Dinosaurs ===
Dinosaurs reported from the Frenchman Formation						
Genus	Species	Location	Stratigraphic position	Material	Notes	Images
Ankylosaurus	A. magniventris				An ankylosaurine ankylosaurid	
cf. Anzu	cf. A. sp.			Two manual unguals	Claws from a large caenagnathid, tentatively referred to Anzu based on size	
?Dromaeosaurus	?D. sp.	Scotty site		Three teeth	Some teeth are up to 3 cm in length.	
Edmontosaurus	E. annectens			"Complete skull, [three or four] partial skulls"	A hadrosaurid	
Edmontosaurus	E. saskatchewanensis				Junior synonym of E. annectens	
Leptorhynchos	L. sp.			A partial skeleton	A caenagnathid theropod	
Ornithomimus	Ornithomimus sp.					
Sphaerotholus	cf. S. buchholtzae			"Nearly complete left postorbital"	The first pachycephalosaurid reported from the Frenchman Formation	
Thescelosaurus	T. assiniboiensis			Nearly complete skeleton		
Torosaurus	T. sp.			Frill	A large chasmosaurine ceratopsian distinct from Triceratops. Fossils have also been unearthed in the Scollard Formation.	
Triceratops	T. prorsus	Redpath, Saskatchewan		Nearly complete skull, one other partial skull	Being one of the most popular dinosaurs, they are widely known.	
Tyrannosaurus	T. rex			Nearly complete skeleton	"Scotty", possibly the largest T. rex ever discovered, is from the Frenchman Formation.	

=== Plants ===
Two megafloral assemblages were collected from Grasslands National Park and the Chambery Coulee site. The differences in floral composition as well as evidence of forest fires indicated these two localities represented an ecological succession in a fire-disturbed environment, with burned mature forests being colonised by pioneer shrubs and then a subsequent reestablishment of coniferous and hardwood forest. Leaf analysis estimated mean annual temperatures of 12–14 °C (54–57 °F) in a largely deciduous mixed forest of temperate climate.

Color key: Taxon / Reclassified taxon / Taxon falsely reported as present / Dubious taxon or junior synonym / Ichnotaxon / Ootaxon / Morphotaxon

Notes
Uncertain or tentative taxa are in small text
~~crossed out~~ taxa are discredited.

Taxa	Species	Locality	Material	Notes	Images
Acer-like	Indeterminate	GNP			
Alnus	A. sp.	GNP			
Araucarites	A. sp.	Chambery Coulee	Cone		
Betula	B. sp.	GNP			
Cercidiphyllum	C. sp.	Chambery Coulee, GNP			
Cinnamomum-like	Indeterminate	Chambery Coulee, GNP		Likely not Cinnamomum.	
Ficus?	Indeterminate	Chambery Coulee, GNP		Likely not in Moraceae.	
Ginkgo	G. sp.	Chambery Coulee			
Juglans	J. sp.	Chambery Coulee	Seeds		
Macginitiea	M. sp.	Chambery Coulee, GNP			
Magnolia	M. sp.	Chambery Coulee, GNP			
Marmarthia	M. sp.	Chambery Coulee		A Lauraceae, similar to Lindera.	
Menispermites	M. sp.	Chambery Coulee		Belongs to Menispermaceae.	
Metasequoia	M. sp.	Chambery Coulee			
Parataxodium?	Indeterminate	Chambery Coulee		In need of revision.	
Platanus	P. sp.	Chambery Coulee, GNP			
Populus	P. sp.	Chambery Coulee, GNP			
Protophyllocladus	P. sp.	Chambery Coulee		Belongs to Podocarpaceae, similar to Phyllocladus.	
Pseudoctenis	P. sp.	Chambery Coulee			
Quercus	Q. sp.	Chambery Coulee			
Rhus	R. sp.	Chambery Coulee, GNP			
Sabalites	S. sp.	Chambery Coulee			
Salix	S. sp.	Chambery Coulee, GNP			
Sapindus	S. sp.	GNP			
Sassafras	S. sp.	GNP			
Sequoia	S. sp.	Chambery Coulee			
Taxodium?	T?. sp.	Chambery Coulee			
Zelkova	Z. sp.	Chambery Coulee			

== See also ==
- List of dinosaur-bearing rock formations
