= Blood Reserve Formation =

Geologic formation of Late Cretaceous age in the Western Canada Sedimentary Basin

- Stratigraphic range: Campanian; ~73–76 Ma
- Type: Geological formation
- Underlies: St. Mary River Formation
- Overlies: Bearpaw Formation
- Thickness: up to 30 metres (100 ft)

Lithology
- Primary: Sandstone

Location
- Coordinates: 49.48°N 112.99°W
- Region: Alberta
- Country: Canada

Type section
- Named for: Blood Indian Reserve No. 148
- Named by: L.S. Russell
- Year defined: 1932
- Blood Reserve Formation (Canada) Blood Reserve Formation (Alberta)

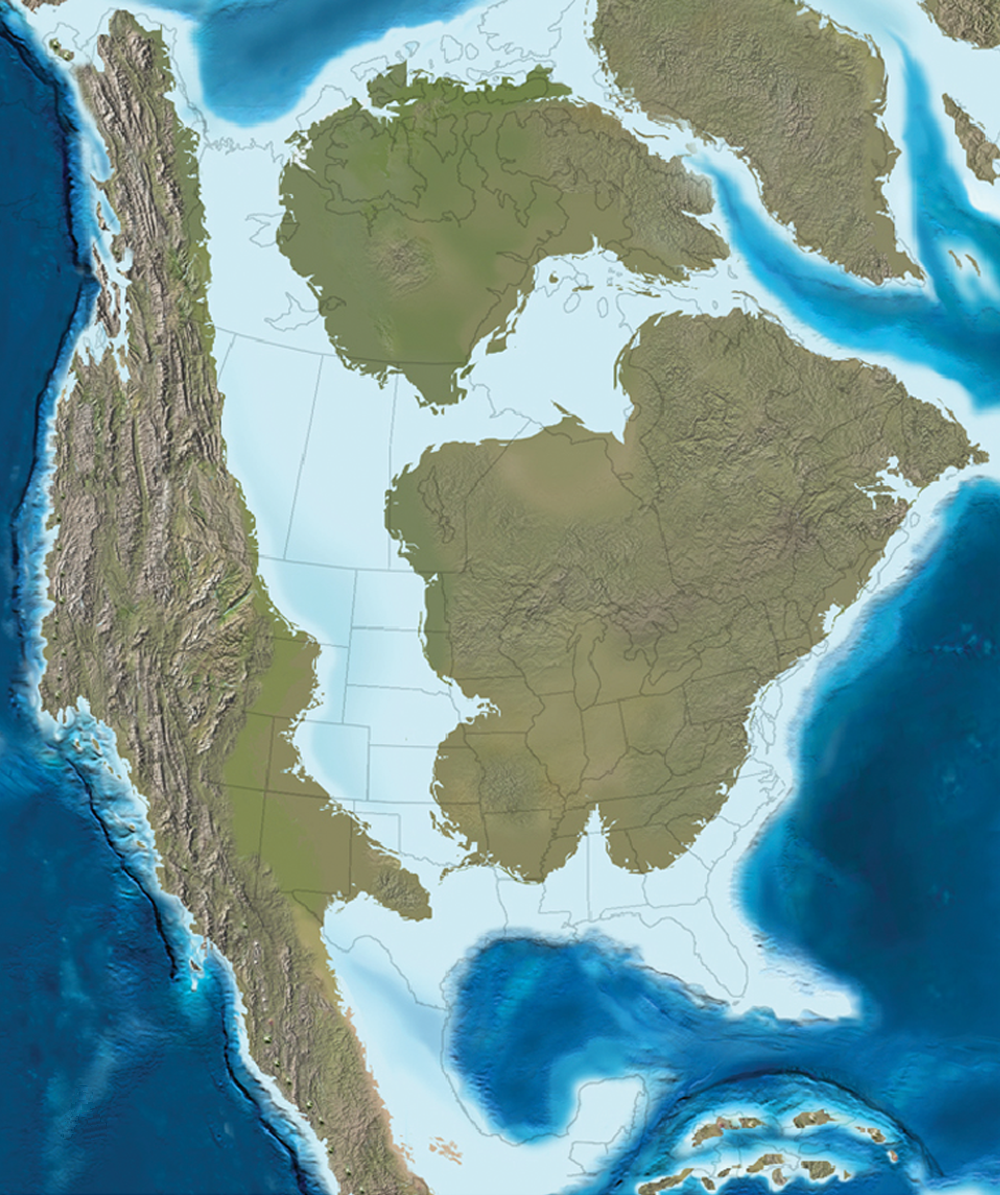
Paleogeography of the Campanian

The Blood Reserve Formation, also known as the Blood Reserve Sandstone, is a geologic formation of Late Cretaceous (Campanian) age in the Western Canada Sedimentary Basin. It is present in southwestern Alberta, Canada, and was named for Blood Indian Reserve No. 148 by L.S. Russell in 1932. It is an aquifer and a source of fresh groundwater.

== Lithology and environment of deposition ==
The Blood Reserve Formation consists of hard, cliff-forming, fine- to medium-grained sandstones. They range in colour from light grey to grey-buff on fresh surfaces, and weather to buff, yellow and greenish. They are cemented by calcite and argillaceous minerals. Cross-bedding and irregular calcite concretions are common in the middle and upper portions. Ophiomorpha burrows are common in the lower part.

The Blood Reserve sandstones are interpreted as shoreline, barrier island and tidal inlet deposits.

== Thickness and distribution ==
The Blood Reserve Formation outcrops in a narrow belt that extends from the Canada–United States border where it is about 30 metres (100 ft) thick, to the Oldman River area where it is about 12 metres (40 ft) thick. It dips westward and is present in the subsurface west of the outcrop belt.

== Relationship to other units ==
The Blood Reserve Formation rests conformably on the marine shales and siltstones of the Bearpaw Formation, and is overlain by the floodplain deposits of the St. Mary River Formation. Its contacts with both are sharp. It is a continuation of the Horsethief Sandstone of northern Montana. It is correlated with the Black Eagle Member of the Bearpaw Formation in the Cypress Hills of southeastern Alberta, and with the lower part of the Horseshoe Canyon Formation to the north.

== Paleontology ==
Trace fossils such as Ophiomorpha burrows, fossil wood with Teredolites borings, and rare Macaronichnus burrows have been reported from the Blood Reserve Formation.
