= Horsethief Sandstone =

Geologic formation in Montana, United States

- Stratigraphic range: Cretaceous
- Type: Geological formation

Location
- Country: United States

The Horsethief Sandstone is a Mesozoic geologic formation in Montana. Dinosaur remains are among the fossils that have been recovered from the formation, although none have yet been referred to a specific genus. The southern part of the Two Medicine Formation grades into the brackish water siltstone/sandstone series that compose the Horsethief Formation. To the north the Horsethief Sandstone is equivalent to the Blood Reserve Formation of Alberta, Canada.

The sediments of the Horsethief represent shallower water deposits than those of the Bearpaw Shale, adding further evidence that higher elevation areas existed to the south of the Two Medicine Formation's depositional area.

== See also ==
- List of dinosaur-bearing rock formations
  - List of stratigraphic units with indeterminate dinosaur fossils
