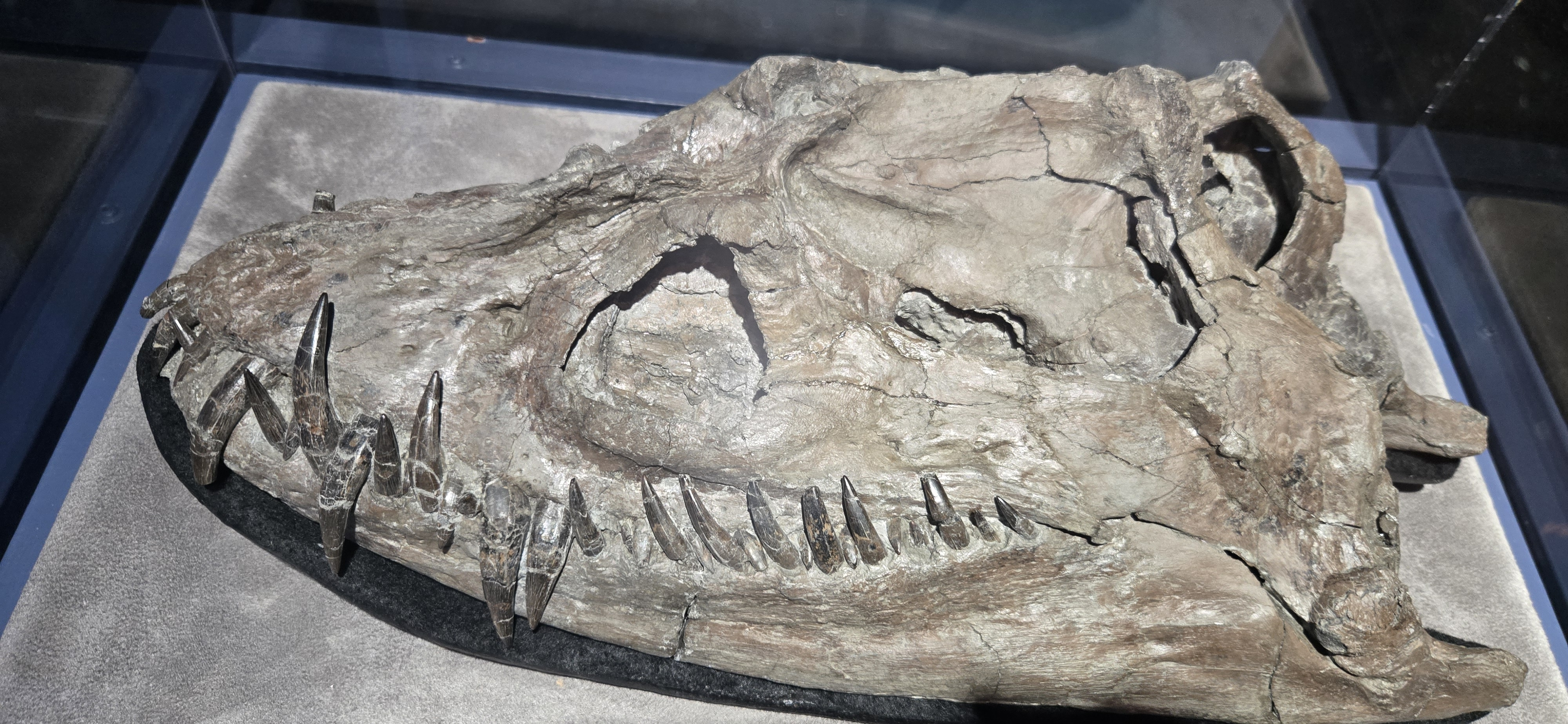
- Holotype skull

Scientific classification
- Kingdom: Animalia
- Phylum: Chordata
- Class: Reptilia
- Superorder: †Sauropterygia
- Order: †Plesiosauria
- Superfamily: †Plesiosauroidea
- Family: †Elasmosauridae
- Genus: †Nakonanectes; Serratos et al., 2017

Type species
- Nakonanectes bradti Serratos et al., 2017

= Nakonanectes =

Nakonanectes Temporal range: Campanian, 73 Ma

Extinct genus of reptiles

Nakonanectes bradti is an elasmosaurid plesiosaur of the late Cretaceous found in 2010 the state of Montana in the United States. It is one of the most recently known elasmosaurids to have lived in North America. Unlike other elasmosaurids, it has a relatively short neck.

== Description ==
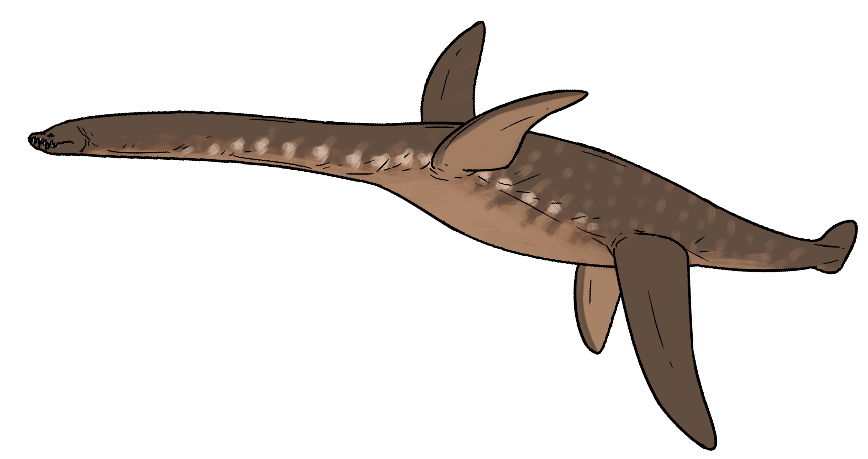
Life restoration

In November 2010, hunter David Bradt stumbled on an elasmosaur fossil at the bottom of a narrow canyon on the Charles M. Russell National Wildlife Refuge. Before it could be salvaged in the spring of 2011, the shale nodule was partly destroyed by flooding. The specimen proved to be a new, short-necked species of elasmosaur, subsequently named Nakonanectes bradti.

The genus name "Nakonanectes" refers to the Nakona people, or Assiniboine. The species name refers to David Bradt.

The type specimen, MOR 3072, was nearly complete. This included the skull, a part not often found intact in Elasmosauridae fossils. Other elements of the fossil included the anterior cervical vertebrae, partial dorsal and caudal vertebrae, incomplete fore and hindlimbs, gastralia, partial pectoral and pelvic girdles, and ribs.

The fossil was found in the Bearpaw Formation, a late Campanian/early Maastrichtian rock, making it one of the last known elasmosaurids to have lived in the Western Interior Seaway.

N. bradti was only 5.1 to 5.6 metres (17 to 18 ft) in length, making it one of the smallest elasmosaurids known. It also had a much shorter neck that most elasmosaurids, with only 39 to 42 cervical vertebrae.

== Classification ==
Danielle Serratos, Patrick Druckenmiller, and Roger Benson found that N. bradti, established by them to be a styxosaurine, is convergent in build to the Aristonectinae, short-necked elasmosaurids known from fossils collected in South America. This indicates that short-necked elasmosaurids evolved in multiple locations on the globe.
