= Battle Formation =

Geologic formation of Late Cretaceous age in the Western Canada Sedimentary Basi

- Stratigraphic range: Maastrichtian; ~67.2–66.9 Ma
- Type: Geological formation
- Unit of: Edmonton Group
- Sub-units: Kneehills Tuff
- Underlies: Scollard Formation
- Overlies: Whitemud Formation, Wapiti Formation
- Thickness: 14 metres (46 ft)

Lithology
- Primary: Mudstone, clay
- Other: Siltstone, sandstone

Location
- Region: Alberta
- Country: Canada

Type section
- Named by: G.M. Furnival, 1955

The Battle Formation is a geologic formation of Late Cretaceous (Maastrichtian) age in the Western Canada Sedimentary Basin. It is present throughout much of the central Alberta plains, where it is an important stratigraphic marker in the nonmarine Upper Cretaceous sequence. It was formally named by G.M. Furnival in 1942 and given formation status by E.J.W. Irish in 1970.

== Stratigraphy ==
The Battle Formation forms part of the Edmonton Group. A marker bed called the Kneehills Tuff is present in the upper part of the formation.

== Lithology ==
The Battle Formation is easily recognized in outcrop and in geophysical well logs. It consists of distinctive mauve-grey to purplish brown mudstones with minor siltstone and rare sandstone. The mudstones contain a large component of volcanic ash that has been altered to bentonitic and montmorillonitic clay, and they form a porous, popcorn-like crust upon weathering. The Kneehills Tuff bed consists of brown-grey, hard siliceous rock.

== Thickness and distribution ==
The Battle Formation reaches thicknesses of up to about 14 m (46 ft), but in some areas it was partially or completely removed by erosion prior to or during the deposition of the overlying Scollard Formation. The Kneehills Tuff occurs as one bed about 15 cm (5.9 in) to 25 cm (9.8 in) thick, or as two or three beds each about 5 cm (2.0 in) to 8 cm (3.1 in) thick in the upper part of the Battle.

== Relationship to other units ==
The Battle Formation unconformably overlies the Whitemud Formation. It is overlain by the Scollard Formation, and the contact is erosional in some areas where basal Scollard paleochannels have cut into or eroded through the Battle. In other areas the contact may be conformable. In the southern Alberta plains it is overlain, apparently conformably, by the Willow Creek Formation, and in Saskatchewan it is overlain by the Frenchman Formation.

The Battle Formation is equivalent to part of the St. Mary River Formation in the southern Alberta plains and is correlative with part of the Brazeau Formation in the foothills of the Alberta Rockies. It is correlated with the part of the Fox Hills Formation in Montana and North Dakota.

== Paleontology ==
The Battle Formation is thought to have been deposited in sediment-starved lacustrine and marsh environments. It is poorly fossiliferous, but arthropods including insects and arachnids preserved in amber, spores, bone fragments, algal remains and carbonized wood have been reported.

=== Arachnid ===
Arachnids of the Battle Formation
Genus	Species	Location	Stratigraphic position	Abundance	Notes	Images
Araneae	indeterminate					
Acarina	indeterminate					

=== Insects ===
==== Blattodea ====
Cockroaches of the Battle Formation
Genus	Species	Location	Stratigraphic position	Abundance	Notes	Images
Blattodea	indeterminate					

==== Hemiptera ====
Bugs of the Battle Formation
Genus	Species	Location	Stratigraphic position	Abundance	Notes	Images
Aphidomorpha	indeterminate					
Mesozoicaphes	M. parva			Nearly complete specimen	Mesozoicaphididae bug	

==== Hymenoptera ====
Wasps and ants of the Battle Formation
Genus	Species	Location	Stratigraphic position	Abundance	Notes	Images
Pseudomyrmecinae	indeterminate			Partial head		
Aneuretinae	indeterminate			Nearly complete specimen missing dorsal part		
Mymaridae	indeterminate			Complete specimen (Male)	Perhaps closest to Myanmymar from the Kachin Amber	
Baeomorphidae	indeterminate			Complete specimen		
Platygastroidea	indeterminate					
Platygastridae	indeterminate					
Hymenoptera	indeterminate					

==== Coleoptera ====
Beetles of the Battle Formation
Genus	Species	Location	Stratigraphic position	Abundance	Notes	Images
Coleoptera	indeterminate					

==== Diptera ====
Flies of the Battle Formation
Genus	Species	Location	Stratigraphic position	Abundance	Notes	Images
Ceratopogonidae	indeterminate					
Stilobezzia	S. sp.					
Chironomidae	indeterminate					
Cecidomyiidae	indeterminate					
Nematocera	indeterminate					
