= Horseshoe Canyon Formation =

Geological formation in Canada

- Stratigraphic range: Campanian-Maastrichtian; ~73.1–68 Ma
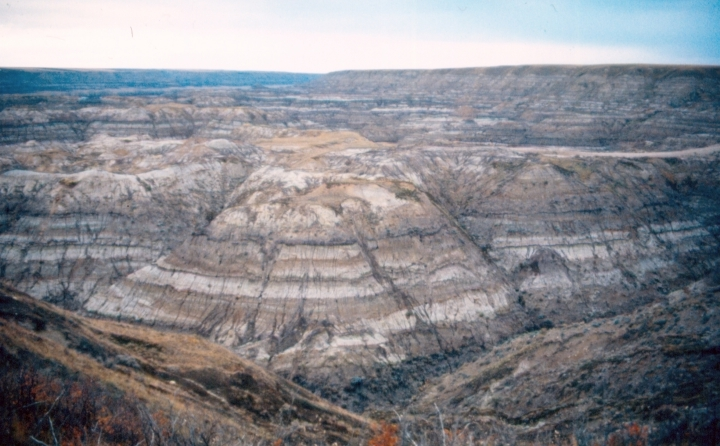
- Horseshoe Canyon Formation at Horsethief Canyon, near Drumheller. The dark bands are coal seams.
- Type: Geological formation
- Unit of: Edmonton Group
- Sub-units: Strathmore Member, Drumheller Member, Horsethief Member, Morrin Member, Tolman Member, Carbon Member, Whitemud Member
- Underlies: Battle Formation, Scollard Formation
- Overlies: Bearpaw Formation

Lithology
- Primary: Sandstone
- Other: Shale, coal

Location
- Coordinates: 51°25′24″N 112°53′18″W
- Region: Alberta
- Country: Canada

Type section
- Named for: Horseshoe Canyon
- Named by: E.J.W. Irish, 1970
- Horseshoe Canyon Formation (Canada) Horseshoe Canyon Formation (Alberta)

The Horseshoe Canyon Formation is a stratigraphic unit of the Western Canada Sedimentary Basin in southwestern Alberta. It takes its name from Horseshoe Canyon, an area of badlands near Drumheller.

The Horseshoe Canyon Formation is part of the Edmonton Group. In its type section (Red Deer River Valley at Drumheller), it is ~250 metres (820 ft) thick, but further west the formation is older and thicker, exceeding 500 metres (1,600 ft) near Calgary. It is of Late Cretaceous age, Campanian to early Maastrichtian stage (Edmontonian Land-Mammal Age), and is composed of mudstone, sandstone, carbonaceous shales, and coal seams. A variety of depositional environments are represented in the succession, including floodplains, estuarine channels, and coal swamps, which have yielded a diversity of fossil material. Tidally-influenced estuarine point bar deposits are easily recognizable as Inclined Heterolithic Stratification (IHS). Brackish-water trace fossil assemblages occur within these bar deposits and demonstrate periodic incursion of marine waters into the estuaries.

The Horseshoe Canyon Formation crops out extensively in the area around Drumheller, as well as farther north along the Red Deer River near Trochu and along the North Saskatchewan River in Edmonton. It is overlain by the Battle and Scollard formations. The Drumheller Coal Zone, located in the lower part of the Horseshoe Canyon Formation, was mined for sub-bituminous coal in the Drumheller area from 1911 to 1979, and the Atlas Coal Mine in Drumheller has been preserved as a National Historic Site. In more recent times, the Horseshoe Canyon Formation has become a major target for coalbed methane (CBM) production.

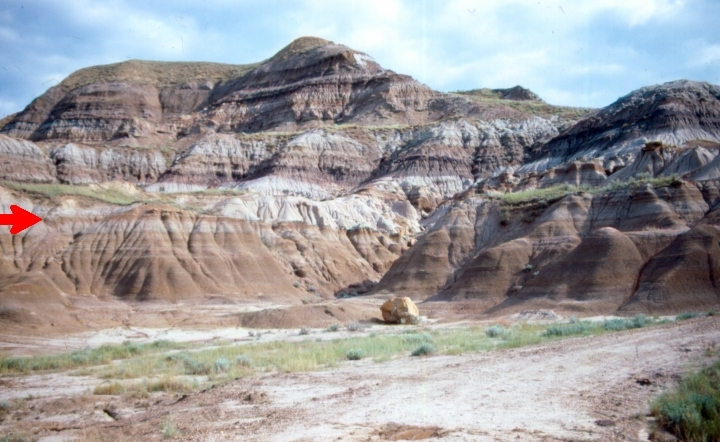
Contact (red arrow) between the underlying marine shales of the Bearpaw Formation and the coastal Horseshoe Canyon Formation. Coal beds (black bands) are common in the Horseshoe Canyon Formation and were formed in coastal swamps.

Dinosaurs found in the Horseshoe Canyon Formation include Albertavenator, Albertosaurus, Anchiceratops, Anodontosaurus, Arrhinoceratops, Atrociraptor, Epichirostenotes, Edmontonia, Edmontosaurus, Hypacrosaurus, Ornithomimus, Pachyrhinosaurus, Parksosaurus, Saurolophus, and Struthiomimus. Other finds have included mammals such as Didelphodon coyi, non-dinosaur reptiles, amphibians, fish, marine and terrestrial invertebrates and plant fossils. Reptiles such as turtles and crocodilians are rare in the Horseshoe Canyon Formation, and this was thought to reflect the relatively cool climate which prevailed at the time. A study by Quinney et al. (2013) however, showed that the decline in turtle diversity, which was previously attributed to climate, coincided instead with changes in soil drainage conditions, and was limited by aridity, landscape instability, and migratory barriers.

== Oil/gas production ==
The Drumheller Coal Zone has been a primary coalbed methane target for industry. In the area between Bashaw and Rockyford, the Coal Zone lies at relatively shallow depths (about 300 metres) and is about 70 to 120 metres thick. It contains 10 to 20 metres of cumulative coal, in up to 20 or more individual thin seams interbedded with sandstone and shale, which combine to make an attractive multi-completion CBM drilling target. In total, it is estimated there are 14 trillion cubic metres (500 tcf) of gas in place in all the coal in Alberta.

== Biostratigraphy ==
The timeline below follows work by David A. Eberth and Sandra L. Kamo published in 2019.

== Dinosaurs ==
=== Ornithischians ===
==== Ankylosaurs ====
Ankylosaurs reported from the Horseshoe Canyon Formation
Genus	Species	Stratigraphic position	Material	Notes	Images
Anodontosaurus	A. lambei	Horsethief, Morrin, and lowest Tolman	[Five] skulls, mandibles, cervical vertebra, caudal vertebrae, dorsal vertebrae, sacrocaudal vertebrae, sacrum, illium, ischium, partial pelvis, coossified ribs, femur, ?manual phalanx, tail clubs, numerous cervical half-rings and osteoderms.	An ankylosaurine ankylosaurid also known from the middle Dinosaur Park Formation and closely related to Ankylosaurus.	
Edmontonia	E. longiceps	Upper Horsethief	A skull with mandible, dorsal vertebrae, dorsal vertebrae, sacral vertebrae, caudal vertebrae, cervical ribs, dorsal ribs, humerus, radius, ulna, radius, ilia, ischia, both pubes (?), femur, tibia, fibula and osteoderms.	A panoplosaurin nodosaurid also known from the lower Dinosaur Park Formation and closely related to Denversaurus.	
Euoplocephalus	E. tutus			Walter Coombs (1971) synonymised Anodontosaurus lambei with E. tutus. However, recent studies suggest that Anodontosaurus is distinct enough from Euoplocephalus to be placed in its own genus and species. Furthermore, all Horseshoe Canyon Formation ankylosaurine specimens were suggested to be reassigned to Anodontosaurus.	

==== Hadrosaurs ====
Hadrosaurs reported from the Horseshoe Canyon Formation
Genus	Species	Location	Stratigraphic position	Material	Notes	Images
Edmontosaurus	E. regalis		Horsethief; likely present in Drumheller.			
Hypacrosaurus	H. altispinus		Morrin and Tolman.	"[Five to ten] articulated skulls, some associated with postcrania, isolated skull elements, isolated postcranial elements, many individuals, embryo to adult."		
Saurolophus	S. osborni		Upper Morrin and Tolman.	"Complete skull and skeleton, [two] complete skulls."		

==== Marginocephalians ====
===== Ceratopsians =====
Color key: Taxon / Reclassified taxon / Taxon falsely reported as present / Dubious taxon or junior synonym / Ichnotaxon / Ootaxon / Morphotaxon	Notes; Uncertain or tentative taxa are in small text; ~~crossed out~~ taxa are discredited.

Ceratopsians reported from the Horseshoe Canyon Formation
Genus	Species	Stratigraphic position	Material	Notes	Images
Anchiceratops	A. ornatus	Horsethief, Morrin, and Tolman; may have been present in Drumheller	[Two] nearly complete skulls and [seven] partial skulls.	A chasmosaurine ceratopsid contemporaneous and closely related to Arrhinoceratops.	
Arrhinoceratops	A. brachyops	Horsethief	A nearly complete skull.	A chasmosaurine ceratopsid restricted to the holotype specimen as Farke (2007) assigned the referred specimen ROM 1439 to Torosaurus.	
Eotriceratops	E. xerinsularis	Carbon	Premaxillae, maxillae, rostral, supraorbital horncore with lacrimal, prefrontal, frontal, postorbital, jugal, epijugal, quadratojugal, quadrate, partial parietal, squamosal frill, braincase, syncervical, cervical vertebrae, dorsal vertebrae, ribs and fragments of ossified ligaments.	A large chasmosaurine ceratopsid that may represent a senior synonym of Ojoceratops from the Ojo Alamo Formation.	
Montanoceratops	M. cerorhynchus	Upper Tolman	An isolated braincase.	A leptoceratopsid ceratopsian also known from the St. Mary River Formation.	
Pachyrhinosaurus	P. canadensis	Drumheller and Horsethief	[Two] partial skulls.	A centrosaurine ceratopsid also known from the St. Mary River Formation.	

===== Pachycephalosaurs =====
Pachycephalosaurids reported from the Horseshoe Canyon Formation
Genus	Species	Location	Stratigraphic position	Material	Notes	Images
Sphaerotholus	S. edmontonense		Tolman	A frontoparietal.	A pachycephalosaurine pachycephalosaurid also known from the Hell Creek and Kirtland Formation.	Sphaerotholus

==== Thescelosaurs ====
Thescelosaurids reported from the Horseshoe Canyon Formation
Genus	Species	Location	Stratigraphic position	Material	Notes	Images
Parksosaurus	P. warreni		Tolman	A partially articulated skeleton and partial skull.	A thescelosaurid neornithischian.	Parksosaurus

=== Theropods ===
==== Maniraptorans ====
Maniraptors reported from the Horseshoe Canyon Formation
Genus	Species	Stratigraphic position	Material	Notes	Images
Albertavenator	A. curriei	Horsethief	[Two] frontals.	A troodontid theropod that adds to the diversity of North American troodontids.	
Albertonykus	A. borealis	Upper Tolman	Ulna, tibiae, metatarsals, manual ungual, pedal phalanxes and unidentified pedal phalanges.	An mononykin alvarezsaurid specialized for digging insect nests.	
Apatoraptor	A. pennatus	Horsethief	A palatine, mandibles, ceratobranchials, axis, cervical vertebrae, dorsal vertebrae, pectoral girdles, sternal plate, forelimb, ilium, femur, tibia and fibula.	A caenagnathid oviraptorosaur recovered as sister taxon to Elmisaurus .	
Atrociraptor	A. marshalli	Lower Horsethief	Premaxillae, maxilla, dentaries, teeth and numerous bone fragments.	A dromaeosaurid; teeth indicate it may have been present across all members.	
Epichirostenotes	E. curriei	Horsethief, Morrin, and Tolman	A maxilla, probable palatine, partial braincase, cervical vertebrae, dorsal vertebrae, caudal vertebrae, synsacrum, an anterior and a posterior cervical rib, a mid-dorsal rib, fragments of ilia, ischium, both pubes, partial tibia, and unidentifiable bones.	A caenagnathid oviraptorosaur known from material previously assigned to Chirostenotes.	

==== Ornithomimids ====
Color key: Taxon / Reclassified taxon / Taxon falsely reported as present / Dubious taxon or junior synonym / Ichnotaxon / Ootaxon / Morphotaxon	Notes; Uncertain or tentative taxa are in small text; ~~crossed out~~ taxa are discredited.

Ornithomimids reported from the Horseshoe Canyon Formation
Genus	Species	Location	Stratigraphic position	Material	Notes	Images
Dromiceiomimus	D. brevitertius			Several specimens. type specimen	An ornithomimid	
Ornithomimus	O. currelli				Junior synonym of O. edmontonicus	
Ornithomimus	O. edmontonicus		Drumheller, Horsethief, Morrin, and Tolman	Several specimens, type specimen	An ornithomimid	
Struthiomimus	S. altus		Drumheller, Horsethief, and Morrin		An ornithomimid	

==== Tyrannosaurs ====
Color key: Taxon / Reclassified taxon / Taxon falsely reported as present / Dubious taxon or junior synonym / Ichnotaxon / Ootaxon / Morphotaxon	Notes; Uncertain or tentative taxa are in small text; ~~crossed out~~ taxa are discredited.

Tyrannosaurids reported from the Horseshoe Canyon Formation
Genus	Species	Location	Stratigraphic position	Material	Notes	Images
Albertosaurus	A. arctunguis				Junior synonym of A. sarcophagus	Albertosaurus
Albertosaurus	A. sarcophagus		Horsethief, Morrin, and Tolman; likely present in Drumheller and Carbon.	Several skeletons and partial skeletons, type specimen	A tyrannosaurid which was the most common large carnivore in the area.	Albertosaurus
Daspletosaurus	D. sp.				Suggested from the skeleton of an immature tyrannosaurid (CMN 11315), thorough analysis of this specimen supports a referral to A. sarcophagus. An isolated maxilla and teeth from an Edmontosaurus bonebed were also mistakenly referred to Daspletosaurus, however all the tyrannosaurid material in the bonebed was confirmed to belong to A. sarcophagus.	Albertosaurus

== Other animals ==
=== Mammals ===
Color key: Taxon / Reclassified taxon / Taxon falsely reported as present / Dubious taxon or junior synonym / Ichnotaxon / Ootaxon / Morphotaxon	Notes; Uncertain or tentative taxa are in small text; ~~crossed out~~ taxa are discredited.

Mammals reported from the Horseshoe Canyon Formation
Genus	Species	Location	Stratigraphic position	Material	Notes	Images
Didelphodon	D. coyi				a stagodontid metatherian	Didelphodon

=== Other reptiles ===
Color key: Taxon / Reclassified taxon / Taxon falsely reported as present / Dubious taxon or junior synonym / Ichnotaxon / Ootaxon / Morphotaxon	Notes; Uncertain or tentative taxa are in small text; ~~crossed out~~ taxa are discredited.

Reptiles reported from the Horseshoe Canyon Formation
Genus	Species	Location	Stratigraphic position	Material	Notes	Images
Stangerochampsa	S. mccabei			"a skull, partial lower jaws, and partial postcranial skeleton"	An alligatoroid	
Champsosaurus	C. albertensis			"partial skeleton with partial skull"	a choristodere	Champsosaurus
Leurospondylus	L. ultimus			"a partial skeleton"	a plesiosaur of uncertain classification	
Basilemys	B. morrinensis			"nearly complete shell"	a nanhsiungchelyid turtle	

=== Fish ===
Color key: Taxon / Reclassified taxon / Taxon falsely reported as present / Dubious taxon or junior synonym / Ichnotaxon / Ootaxon / Morphotaxon	Notes; Uncertain or tentative taxa are in small text; ~~crossed out~~ taxa are discredited.

Fish reported from the Horseshoe Canyon Formation
Genus	Species	Location	Stratigraphic position	Material	Notes	Images
Boreiosturion	B. labyrinthicus	Edmonton.		Partial skull.	A sturgeon.	
Horseshoeichthys	H. armaserratus				An ellimmichthyiform	

== See also ==
- List of dinosaur-bearing rock formations
