= Mesozoicaphididae =

Mesozoicaphididae Temporal range: Campanian–Maastrichtian

Scientific classification
- Domain: Eukaryota
- Kingdom: Animalia
- Phylum: Arthropoda
- Class: Insecta
- Order: Hemiptera
- Suborder: Sternorrhyncha
- Infraorder: Aphidomorpha
- Superfamily: Adelgoidea
- Family: †Mesozoicaphididae; Heie, 1992

Extinct family of true bugs

Mesozoicaphididae is an extinct family of aphids in the order Hemiptera. There are at least four genera and about seven described species in Mesozoicaphididae.

== Genera ==
These four genera belong to the family Mesozoicaphididae:

- † Albertaphis Heie, 1992
- † Calgariaphis Heie, 1992
- † Campaniaphis Heie, 1992
- † Mesozoicaphis Heie, 1992
