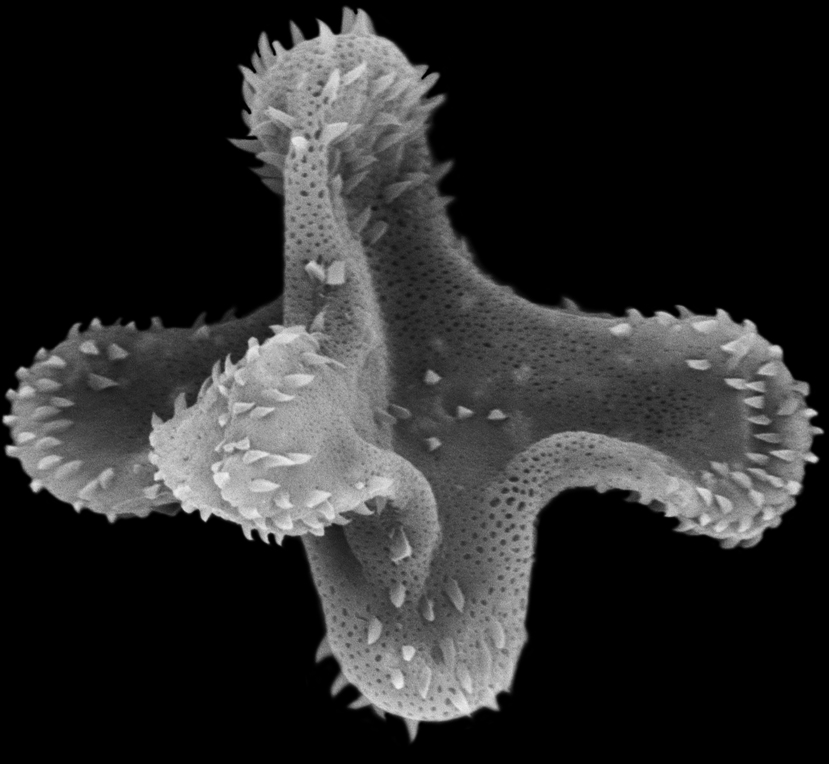

Scientific classification
- Kingdom: Plantae
- Order: Santalales
- Family: Santalaceae
- Genus: †Aquillapollenites

= Aquillapollenites =

Aquillapollenites Temporal range: Cretaceous–Eocene

Fossil pollen grain

Aquillapollenites is an extinct morphogenus of Late Cretaceous angiosperm pollen grain. Aquillapollenites was a very large group containing something like 80 total species, but all of them were typified by their triprojectate structure: three processes extend from the equator of the pollen grain, and one process extends upwards to each pole, giving Aquillapollenites the shape of a child's jack. This strange shape may improve the buoyancy of the pollen grain. Colpi occupy each terminus of the equatorial projectates, making Aquillapollenites tricolporate.

Aquillapollenities was mostly extinct by the end of the Cretaceous, but a few species survive across the K-T boundary into the Eocene Epoch. North America's northern animal biome approximately correspond with the Aquillapollenites palynofloral province.

It has been suggested that Aquillapollenites is a pollen type produced by an extinct member of the mistletoe family, but this remains uncertain.
