= Scollard Formation =

Geologic formation in Alberta, Canada

- Stratigraphic range: Maastrichtian-Danian; ~70–65 Ma
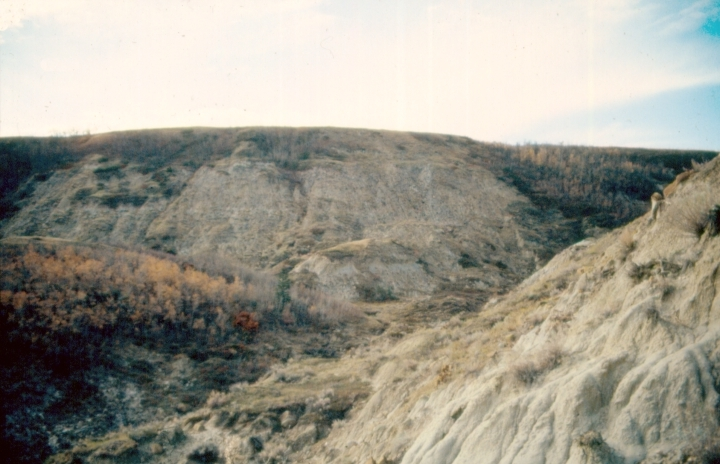
- Scollard Formation exposed along the Red Deer River, Alberta. The Tyrannosaurus rex skeleton on display at the Royal Tyrrell Museum of Palaeontology was excavated in the center of image.
- Type: Geological formation
- Unit of: Edmonton Group
- Sub-units: Ardley coal zone
- Underlies: Paskapoo Formation
- Overlies: Battle Formation
- Thickness: Up to 300 metres (980 ft)

Lithology
- Primary: Sandstone, siltstone, shale
- Other: Coal, bentonite

Location
- Coordinates: 51°56′19″N 112°55′37″W
- Approximate paleocoordinates: 62.8°N 86.2°W
- Region: Alberta
- Country: Canada
- Extent: Western Canada Sedimentary Basin

Type section
- Named for: Scollard Canyon at Dry Island Buffalo Jump Provincial Park
- Named by: Irish, E.J.W
- Year defined: 1970
- Scollard Formation (Canada) Scollard Formation (Alberta)

The Scollard Formation is an Upper Cretaceous to lower Palaeocene stratigraphic unit of the Western Canada Sedimentary Basin in southwestern Alberta. Its deposition spanned the interval from latest Cretaceous to early Paleocene, and it includes sediments that were deposited before, during, and after the Cretaceous-Paleogene (K-Pg) extinction event. It is significant for its fossil record, and it includes the economically important coal deposits of the Ardley coal zone.

== Lithology ==
The Scollard Formation consists primarily of sandstones and siltstones, interbedded with mudstones and, in the upper portion, coal seams, as well as minor amounts of bentonite. The sediments were eroded from the Canadian Cordillera, and were transported eastward by river systems and deposited in fluvial channel and floodplain environments.

== Stratigraphy ==
The Scollard is usually classified as the uppermost formation of the Edmonton Group, although some early workers included it in the overlying Paskapoo Formation. It is subdivided into an upper, coal-bearing member that consists of the Ardley coal zone, and a lower member that lacks significant coal. Neither member has been formally named.

=== Age ===
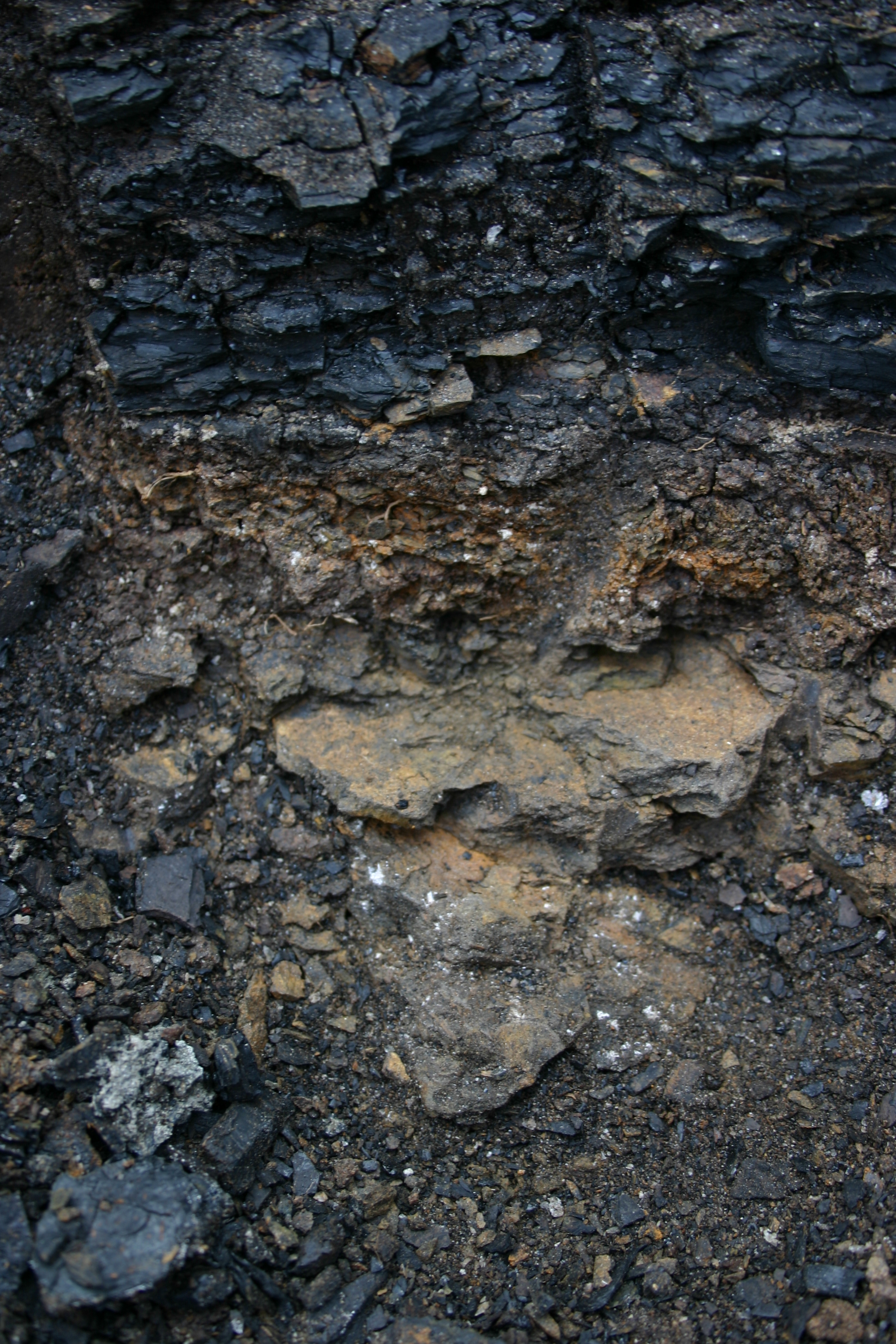
The K-Pg boundary in the Scollard Formation. The coals are earliest Paleocene in age, lighter shales below are Maastrichtian. The lighter rock at the very base of the dark coals represents the K-Pg boundary.

The K-Pg boundary occurs at the base of the lowermost seam of Ardley coal zone, based on dinosaurian and microfloral evidence, as well as the presence of the terminal Cretaceous iridium anomaly. The upper member is therefore of early Danian age, while the lower member is of latest Maastrichtian age.

=== Distribution ===
The Scollard Formation is present in the subsurface throughout much of southwestern Alberta, and it outcrops extensively along the banks of the Red Deer River in the area of Trochu. Both the upper and lower members thin from west to east. Thicknesses for each member range from more than 300 metres (980 ft) near the foothills of the Canadian Rockies to less than 100 metres (330 ft) near the outcrops in south-central Alberta.

=== Relationship to other units ===
The Scollard Formation rests disconformably on the Late Cretaceous Battle Formation in the southwestern Alberta plains, on the Wapiti Formation in the northwestern plains, and on the Brazeau Formation in the foothills. It is unconformably overlain by the Paskapoo Formation, and where the Paskapoo has been removed by erosion, the Scollard is exposed at surface or covered by Quaternary sediments.

The Scollard grades into the Willow Creek Formation in the southern Alberta plains and the Coalspur Formation in the Alberta foothills. The Ardley coal zone in the upper portion is equivalent to the lower part of the Coalspur coal zone of the Coalspur Formation, and is correlated with the lower part of the Ravenscrag Formation of southern Saskatchewan, which is also coal bearing. The Late Cretaceous member is equivalent in age to the Frenchman Formation of Saskatchewan, the Hell Creek Formation of Montana, and the Lance Formation of Wyoming.

== Coal deposits ==
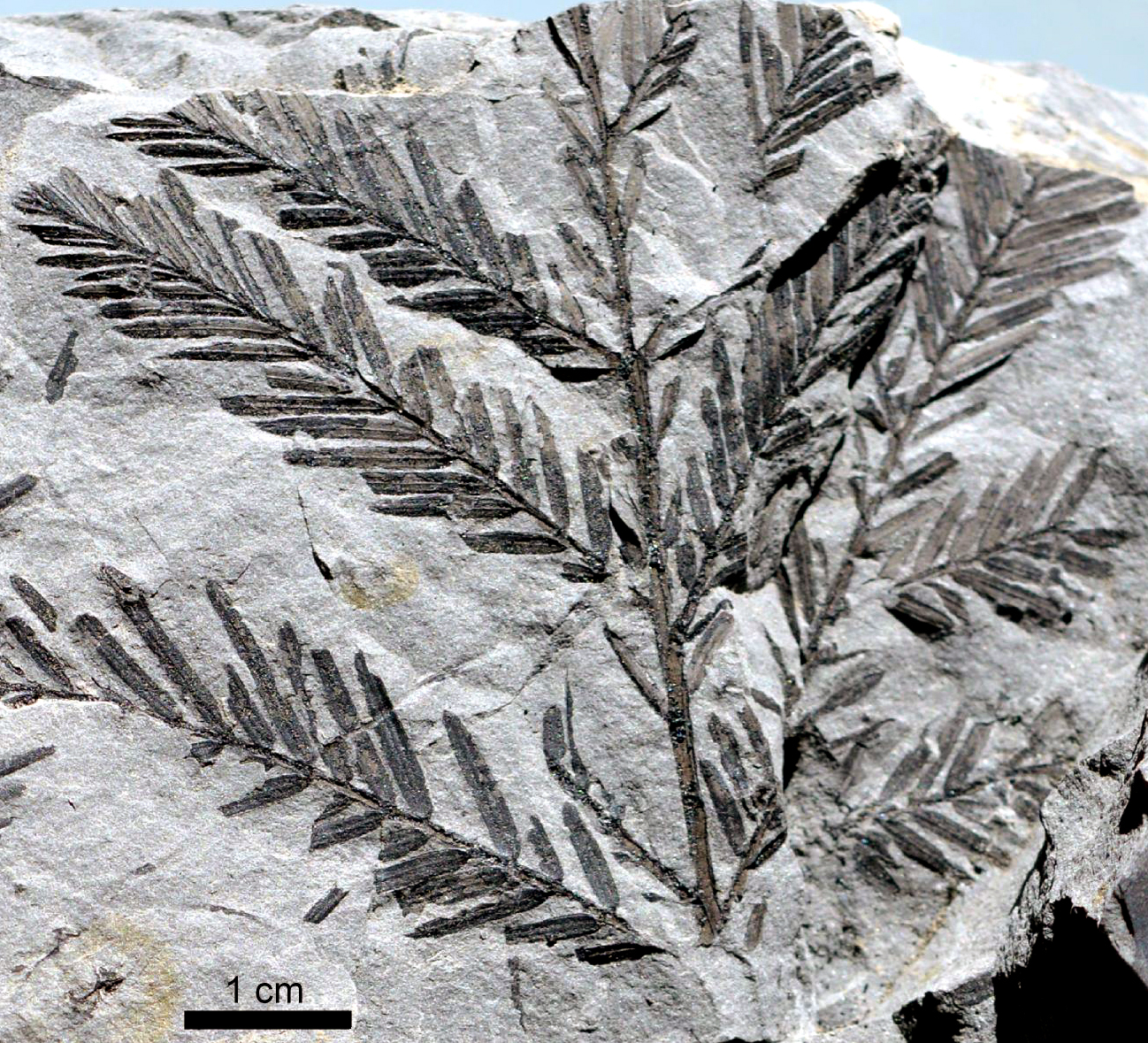
Metasequoia occidentalis, upper Scollard Formation, central Alberta

The coal seams of the Ardley coal zone attain thicknesses in excess of 7 metres (20 ft) in some areas. The zone is present at shallow depths and, in places, exposed at surface, along a trend between Red Deer and Edmonton. The coal is typically of sub-bituminous B to C rank, although more deeply buried Scollard coals farther to the west reach high-volatile bituminous rank. The Ardley coal has been mined in the Red Deer area, and is currently being mined west of Edmonton to fuel mine-mouth electric power generating stations.

== Paleontology ==
The Scollard Formation preserves the remains of vertebrates, especially dinosaurs and, rarely, mammals, as well as a wide range of plant fossils. The Scollard strata span the K-Pg boundary, therefore the lower member of the Scollard provides a record of the last of the dinosaurs, while the upper member records the dawn of the Age of Mammals after the K-Pg extinction event.

=== Flora ===
Plant fossils from the upper, early Paleocene member of the Scollard Formation include species of the ferns Botrychium, Woodwardia and Azolla; the conifers Metasequoia and Glyptostrobus; the monocot Limnobiophyllum (a relative of duckweeds), Sabalites geneseensis (similar to Serenoa repens); and the dicots Cercidiphyllum and Platanus. Leaf analysis of the Genesee flora estimated mean annual temperature at 11 °C (52 °F) with a cold month mean temperature of 2.4 °C (36.3 °F). Graminidites, a Grass palynomorph occurs in the Maastrichtian Scollard Formation. The species, G. ulkapites, occurs at the initiation of a temperate climate in the area.

=== Vertebrates ===
Crocodylian Albertosuchus, acanthomorph fish Lindoeichthys, otophysan fish Acronichthys, and an unnamed esocid fish are known. Taeniodont mammal Schowalteria is also known from the Scollard formation.

==== Theropods ====
Ornithomimus remains have been unearthed here. Two caenagnathid taxa, a large-bodied one similar to Caenagnathus and a small-bodied one similar to Leptorhynchos have been found.

Theropods
Genus	Species	Location	Stratigraphic position	Material	Description	Images
cf. Dromaeosaurus	Indeterminate			Teeth	A dromaeosaurid	Dromaeosaurus Saurornitholestes Troodon Tyrannosaurus
Red Deer River, Alberta Canada cf. Paronychodon	Indeterminate					Dromaeosaurus Saurornitholestes Troodon Tyrannosaurus
cf. Richardoestesia	cf. R. gilmorei					Dromaeosaurus Saurornitholestes Troodon Tyrannosaurus
cf. Richardoestesia	cf. R. isosceles					Dromaeosaurus Saurornitholestes Troodon Tyrannosaurus
cf. Saurornitholestes	cf. S. langstoni					Dromaeosaurus Saurornitholestes Troodon Tyrannosaurus
Troodon	Indeterminate			A single tooth		Dromaeosaurus Saurornitholestes Troodon Tyrannosaurus
Tyrannosaurus	T. rex	Red Deer River, Alberta Canada		Partial skeleton		Dromaeosaurus Saurornitholestes Troodon Tyrannosaurus

==== Ornithischians ====
Fossil remains of the nodosaur Edmontonia and the chasmosaur Torosaurus have also been unearthed here and in the nearby areas.

Color key: Taxon / Reclassified taxon / Taxon falsely reported as present / Dubious taxon or junior synonym / Ichnotaxon / Ootaxon / Morphotaxon	Notes; Uncertain or tentative taxa are in small text; ~~crossed out~~ taxa are discredited.

Ornithischians
Genus	Species	Location	Stratigraphic position	Material	Description	Images
Ankylosaurus	A magniventris			Complete skull, both mandibles, ribs, caudal vertebrae, tail club, both humeri, left ischium, left femur, right fibula, and osteoderms.	An ankylosaurine ankylosaurid also found in the Lance, Frenchman, Ferris and Hell Creek Formations.	Ankylosaurus Edmontosaurus Leptoceratops Pachycephalosaurus Thescelosaurus Triceratops
Edmontosaurus	E. annectens					Ankylosaurus Edmontosaurus Leptoceratops Pachycephalosaurus Thescelosaurus Triceratops
Leptoceratops	L. gracilis			Partial Skull		Ankylosaurus Edmontosaurus Leptoceratops Pachycephalosaurus Thescelosaurus Triceratops
cf. Pachycephalosaurus	P. wyomingensis			Domed Parietal		Ankylosaurus Edmontosaurus Leptoceratops Pachycephalosaurus Thescelosaurus Triceratops
Thescelosaurus	T. edmontonensis			Partial Skull	Referred to Thescelosaurus sp.	Ankylosaurus Edmontosaurus Leptoceratops Pachycephalosaurus Thescelosaurus Triceratops
Triceratops	T. prorsus	Drumheller, Alberta Canada		Nearly Complete Skull		Ankylosaurus Edmontosaurus Leptoceratops Pachycephalosaurus Thescelosaurus Triceratops

== See also ==
- List of dinosaur-bearing rock formations
