= Brazeau Formation =

Geologic formation in Canada

- Stratigraphic range: Cretaceous
- Type: Formation

Location
- Region: Alberta
- Country: Canada

The Brazeau Formation is a geologic formation in Alberta. It preserves fossils dating back to the Cretaceous period.

== See also ==
- List of fossiliferous stratigraphic units in Alberta
