= Bearpaw Formation =

Geologic formation in North America

- Stratigraphic range: Campanian-Maastrichtian, 75–72 Ma
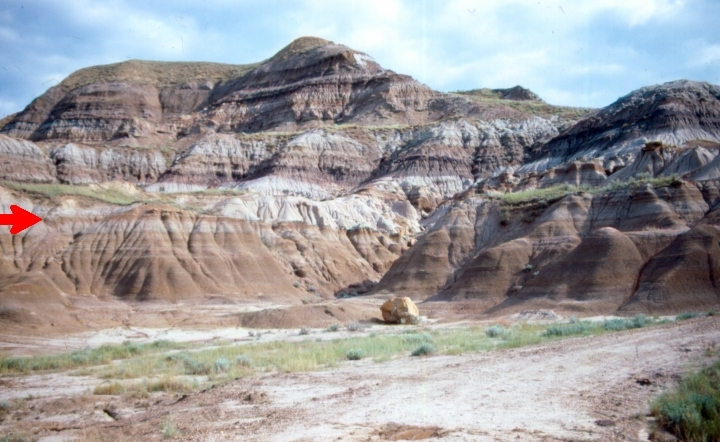
- Contact (red arrow) between the underlying marine shales of the Bearpaw Formation and the coastal Horseshoe Canyon Formation
- Type: Geological formation
- Unit of: Montana Group
- Underlies: Horseshoe Canyon Formation, St. Mary River Formation, Eastend Formation, and others
- Overlies: Dinosaur Park Formation, Judith River Formation
- Thickness: Up to 350 meters (1,150 ft)

Lithology
- Primary: Shale, claystone
- Other: Siltstone, sandstone, concretionary beds

Location
- Coordinates: 48°15′0″N 109°30′0″W
- Region: Alberta, Saskatchewan, Montana
- Country: Canada, United States
- Extent: Northern Montana to central Alberta and southern Saskatchewan

Type section
- Named for: Bear Paw Mountains, Montana
- Named by: Hatcher and Stanton, 1903

The Bearpaw Formation, also called the Bearpaw Shale, is a geologic formation of Late Cretaceous (Campanian) age. It outcrops in the U.S. state of Montana, as well as the Canadian provinces of Alberta and Saskatchewan, and was named for the Bear Paw Mountains in Montana. It includes a wide range of marine fossils, as well as the remains of a few dinosaurs. It is known for its fossil ammonites, some of which are mined in Alberta to produce the organic gemstone ammolite.

== Lithology and depositional environment ==
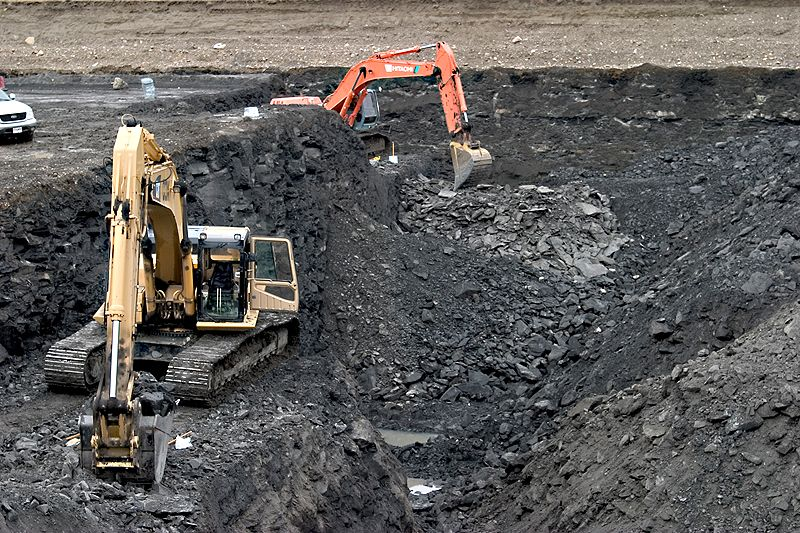
Bearpaw shale being excavated to recover ammonites for ammolite production

The formation was deposited in the Bearpaw Sea, which was part of the Western Interior Seaway that advanced and then retreated across the region during Campanian time. It is composed primarily of dark grey shales, claystones, silty claystones and siltstones, with subordinate silty sandstones. It also includes bedded and nodular concretions (both calcareous and ironstone concretions) and thin beds of bentonite. As the seaway retreated toward the southwest, the marine sediments of the Bearpaw became covered by the deltaic and coastal plain sediments of the overlying formations.

== Relationship to other units ==
The Bearpaw Formation conformably overlies the Dinosaur Park Formation of the Belly River Group in central Alberta, and the Judith River Formation in the plains to the east and Montana. It is overlain by the Horseshoe Canyon Formation in central Alberta; by the Blood Reserve Formation and the St. Mary River Formation in southern Alberta; by the Eastend Formation in southern Saskatchewan; and by the Fox Hills Formation in Montana. To the east, it merges into the Pierre Shale.

== Fauna ==
Color key: Taxon / Reclassified taxon / Taxon falsely reported as present / Dubious taxon or junior synonym / Ichnotaxon / Ootaxon / Morphotaxon	Notes; Uncertain or tentative taxa are in small text; ~~crossed out~~ taxa are discredited.

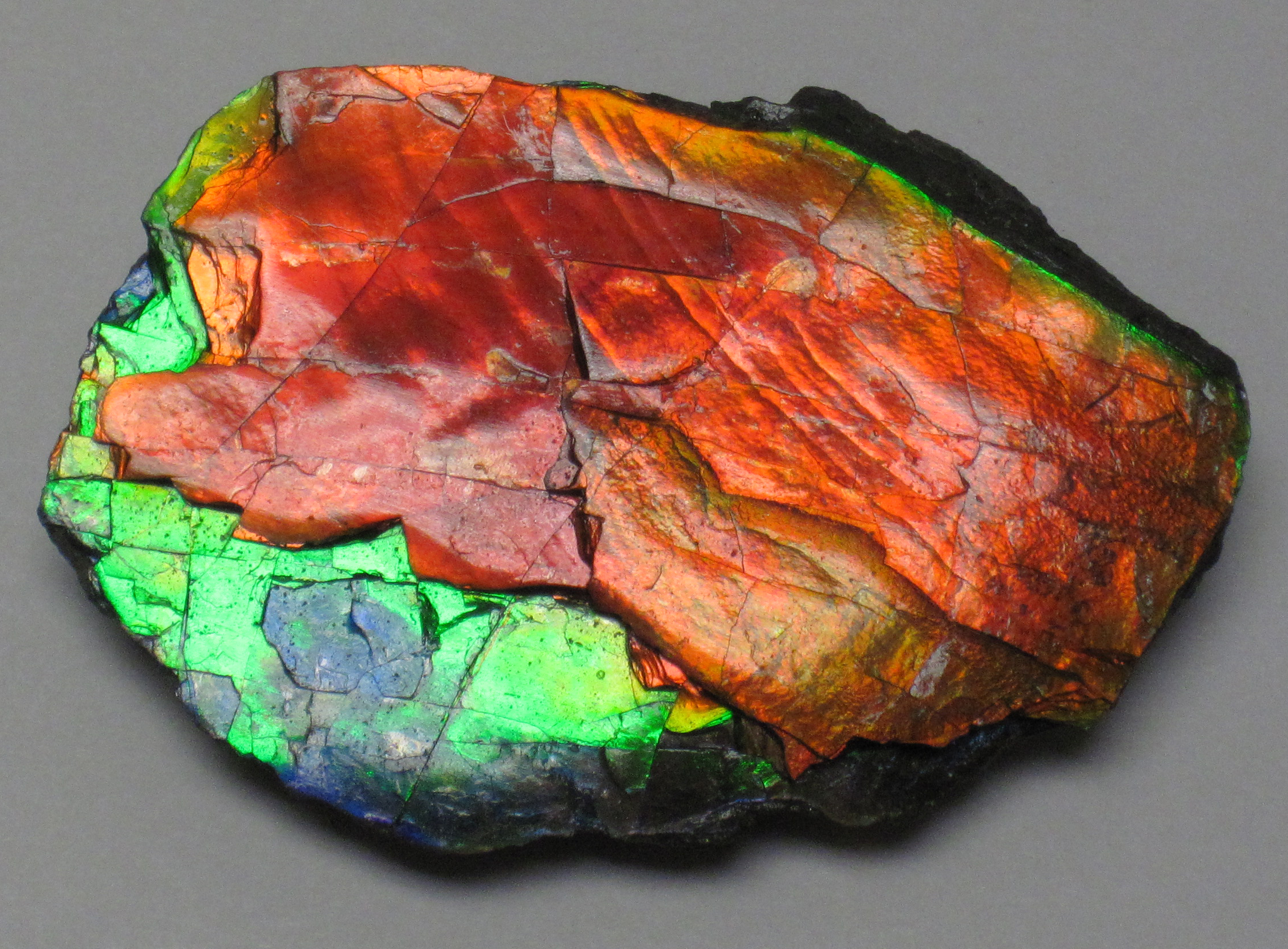
A specimen of Placenticeras ammolite from the Bearpaw Formation

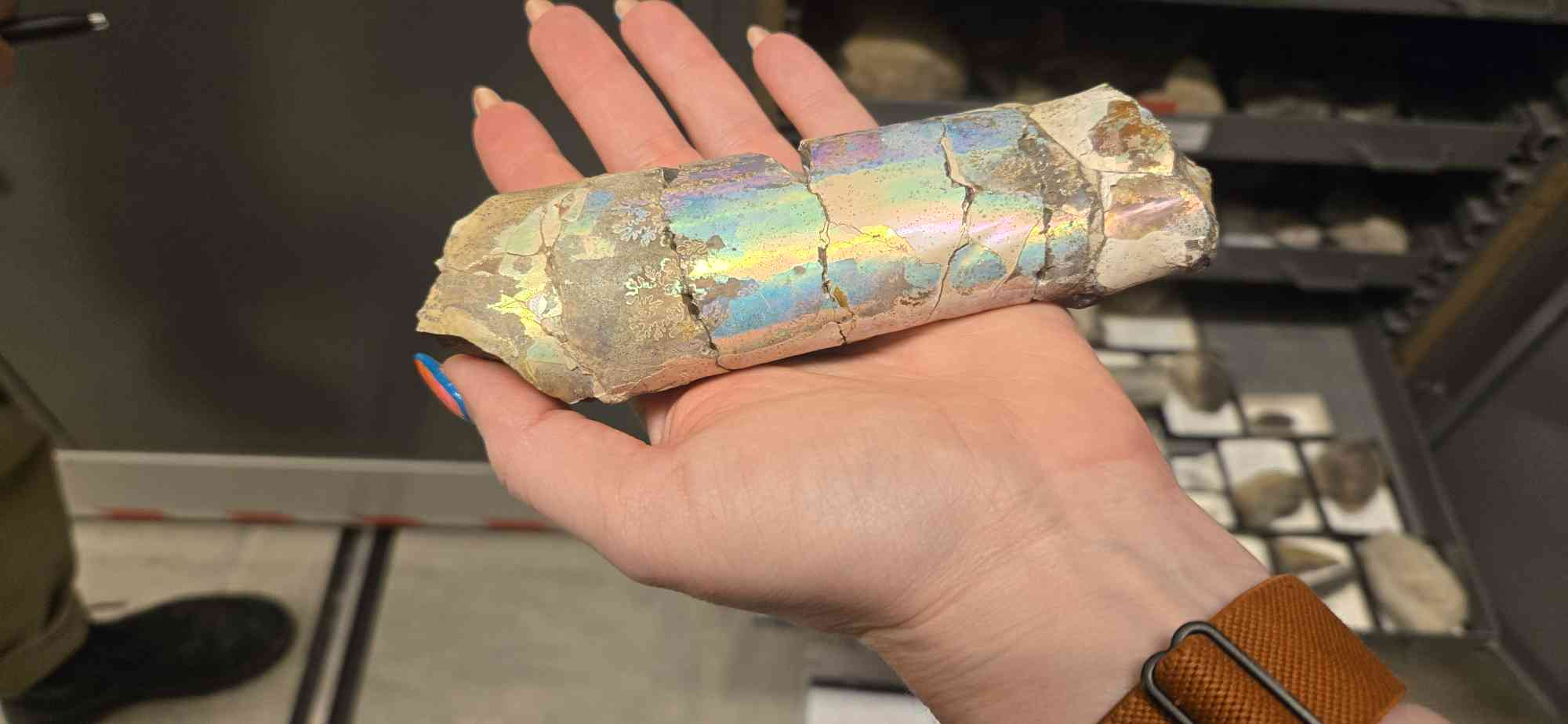
A specimen of Baculities from the Bearpaw Formation with preserved nacre, housed at the University of Montana

The Bearpaw Formation is famous for its well-preserved ammonite fossils. These include Placenticeras meeki, Placenticeras intercalare, Hoploscaphites, and Sphenodiscus, the baculite Baculites compressus and the bivalve Inoceramus, some of which are mined south-central Alberta to produce the organic gemstone ammolite.

Other fossils found in this formation include many types of shellfish, bony fish, sharks, rays, birds, and marine reptiles like mosasaurs such as Prognathodon overtoni and Plioplatecarpus peckensis, plesiosaurs such as Dolichorhynchops herschelensis, Albertonectes and Nakonanectes, and sea turtles. Dinosaur remains have occasionally been discovered, presumably from carcasses that washed out to sea.

=== Dinosaurs ===
Dinosaurs from the Bearpaw Formation
Genus	Species	Location	Member	Material	Notes	Images
Brachylophosaurus	Indeterminate					Brachylophosaurus
Daspletosaurus						Daspletosaurus
Edmontonia	Indeterminate					Edmontonia
cf. Kritosaurus				"Nearly complete skull and postcranium"	A hadrosaurid	Kritosaurus
Prosaurolophus	P. maximus			Three juvenile specimens	A Saurolophinae hadrosaurid, also known from the Dinosaur Park and Two Medicine Formations	Prosaurolophus
Stegoceras	Indeterminate					Stegoceras

=== Plesiosaurs ===
Plesiosaurs from the Bearpaw Formation
Genus	Species	Location	Member	Material	Notes	Images
Albertonectes	A. vanderveldei	Alberta		A complete, well-preserved postcranial specimen, missing only the skull	An elasmosaurid plesiosaur. Albertonectes has the longest neck of any known plesiosaur.	Albertonectes
Nakonanectes	N. bradti	Montana		A nearly complete skeleton including the skull	A small elasmosaurid plesiosaur with an unusually short neck	
Terminonatator	T. ponteixensis	Saskatchewan		A partially articulated incomplete skeleton, including a skull	An elasmosaurid plesiosaur	
Dolichorhynchops	D. herschelensis	Saskatchewan		An incomplete skeleton	One of the latest known polycotylids	

=== Mosasaurs ===
Mosasaurs from the Bearpaw Formation
Genus	Species	Location	Member	Material	Notes	Images
Mosasaurus	M. missouriensis	Alberta and Montana		Several specimens, including a near complete skeleton with stomach contents	A large mosasaurine mosasaur	Mosasaurus missouriensis
Mosasaurus	M. conodon	Saskatchewan			A large mosasaurine mosasaur	Mosasaurus conodon
Prognathodon	P. overtoni	Alberta		Several exceptionally preserved specimens	A large mosasaurine mosasaur	Prognathodon overtoni
Plioplatecarpus	P. primaevus	Saskatchewan			A widespread genus of plioplatecarpine mosasaur	Plioplatecarpus
Plioplatecarpus	P. peckensis	Montana			A widespread genus of plioplatecarpine mosasaur	Plioplatecarpus
Tylosaurus	T. saskatchewanensis	Saskatchewan		A single semi-complete skeleton	A large tylosaurine mosasaur	Tylosaurus

=== Turtles ===
Turtles from the Bearpaw Formation
Genus	Species	Location	Member	Material	Notes	Images
Nichollsemys	N. baieri	Alberta		Known from skulls	A basal chelonioid sea turtle	Nichollsemys

=== Bony fish ===
Bony fish from the Bearpaw Formation
Genus	Species	Location	Member	Material	Notes	Images
Dercetis	D. magnificus	Alberta		2 articulated specimens	A dercetid aulopiform	Dercetis
Ursichthys	U. longiparietalis	Alberta		Partial skeleton, recovered within a Mosasaurus specimen	An ichthyotringoid aulopiform	

=== Cartilaginous fish ===
Cartilaginous fish from the Bearpaw Formation
Genus	Species	Location	Member	Material	Notes	Images
Squalicorax	S. sp	Alberta			Shark	
Meristodonoides	M. montanensis	Alberta				
Paraorthacodus	P. andersoni	Alberta				
Squalus	S. worlandensis	Alberta				
Carcharias	C. cf samhammeri	Alberta				
Odontaspis	O. aculeatus	Alberta				
Cretoxyrhina	C. mantelli	Alberta				

=== Flora ===
Plants from the Bearpaw Formation
Genus	Species	Location	Member	Material	Notes	Images
Aquilapollenites	A.quadrilobus	Saskatchewan			Pollen from a flowering plant	
Aquilapollenites	A.attenuatus	Saskatchewan			Pollen from a flowering plant	
Sequoia	S.sp	Montana			Redwood conifer	
