= 1963 in paleontology =

Paleontology or palaeontology is the study of prehistoric life forms on Earth through the examination of plant and animal fossils. This includes the study of body fossils, tracks (ichnites), burrows, cast-off parts, fossilised feces (coprolites), palynomorphs and chemical residues. Because humans have encountered fossils for millennia, paleontology has a long history both before and after becoming formalized as a science. This article records significant discoveries and events related to paleontology that occurred or were published in the year 1963.

== Arthropods ==
=== Newly named insects ===
| Name | Novelty | Status | Authors | Age | Unit | Location | Notes | Images |
|---|---|---|---|---|---|---|---|---|
| Propelma | Gen et sp. nov | valid | Trjapitzin | Eocene | Baltic amber | Europe | A eupelmid wasp. Type species P. rohdendorfi | |

== Vertebrates ==
=== Archosauromorphs ===
| Name | Novelty | Status | Authors | Age | Unit | Location | Notes | Images |
|---|---|---|---|---|---|---|---|---|
| "Triassolestes" | Gen et sp nov | preoccupied | Reig | Carnian | | | A Crocodylomorph, Preoccupied by Triassolestes Tillyard 1918. Renamed Trialestes. | |

=== Dinosauria ===
Data courtesy of George Olshevsky's dinosaur genera list.

| Name | Status | Authors | Age | Unit | Location | Notes | Images |
|---|---|---|---|---|---|---|---|
| Herrerasaurus | Valid taxon | Osvaldo Reig | Late Triassic (Carnian) | Ischigualasto Formation | Argentina | A herrerasaurid. This was an early flesh-eating dinosaur. | |
| "Ischisaurus" | Junior synonym of Herrerasaurus | Osvaldo Reig | Late Triassic (Carnian) | | | A herrerasaurid. | |
| "Tanystrosuchus" | Nomen dubium. | Kuhn | Late Triassic (Norian) | Stubensandstein | | Either a theropod or shuvosaurid. | |

=== Birds ===
| Name | Novelty | Status | Authors | Age | Unit | Location | Notes | Images |
|---|---|---|---|---|---|---|---|---|
| Agriocharis anza | Sp. nov. | synonym | Howard | Middle Pleistocene | Palm Spring Formation | USA (California) | A Phasianidae, a synonym of Meleagris anza | |
| Anas itchtucknee | Sp. nov. | valid | McCoy | Late Pleistocene | | | An Anatidae. | |
| Aphanocrex podarces | Gen. nov et Sp. nov. | valid | Wetmore | Holocene | St. Helena | Saint Helena | A Rallidae. | |
| Brantadorna downsi | Gen. Nov. et Sp. nov. | valid | Howard | Middle Pleistocene | Palm Spring Formation | USA (California) | An Anatidae. | |
| Bucephala fossilis | Sp. nov. | valid | Howard | Middle Pleistocene | Palm Spring Formation | USA (California) | An Anatidae. | |
| Calidris rayi | Sp. nov. | valid | Brodkorb | Early Pliocene | | | A Scolopacidae. | |
| Ceramornis major | Gen. et Sp. nov. | valid | Brodkorb | Late Maastrichtian | Lance Formation | USA (Wyoming) | A Cimolopterygidae Brodkorb, 1963. | |
| Cimolopteryx maxima | Sp. nov. | valid | Brodkorb | Late Maastrichtian | Lance Formation | USA (Wyoming) | A Cimolopterygidae Brodkorb, 1963. | |
| Cimolopteryx rara | Gen. nov. et Sp. nov. | valid | Brodkorb | Late Maastrichtian | Lance Formation | USA (Wyoming) | A Cimolopterygidae Brodkorb, 1963. | |
| Dromiceius ocypus | Synonym | valid | Holmes Miller | Early Pliocene | Mampuwordu Sands | Australia | A Dromaiidae, transferred to the genus Dromaius. | |
| Fulica hesterna | Sp. nov. | valid | Howard | Middle Pleistocene | Palm Spring Formation | USA (California) | A Rallidae. | |
| Gallinula brodkorbi | Sp. nov. | valid | McCoy | Late Pleistocene | | | A Rallidae. | |
| Lonchodytes | Gen. et Sp. nov. | valid | Brodkorb | Late Maastrichtian | Lance Formation | USA (Wyoming) | A Gaviiformes, type sp. L. estesi | |
| Lonchodytes pterygius | Sp. nov. | valid | Brodkorb | Late Maastrichtian | Lance Formation | USA (Wyoming) | A Gaviiformes | |
| Nanortyx | Gen et sp. nov. | valid | Weigel | Early Oligocene | Cypress Hills Formation | Canada (Saskatchewan) | An Odontophoridae, type sp. N. inexpectatus | |
| Neococcyx | Gen et sp. nov. | valid | Weigel | Early Oligocene | Cypress Hills Formation | Canada (Saskatchewan) | A Coccyzid, type sp. N. mccorquodalei | |
| Neophrontops vallecitoensis | Sp. nov. | valid | Howard | Middle Pleistocene | Palm Spring Formation | USA (California) | An Accipitridae. | |
| Nycticorax fidens | Sp. nov. | valid | Brodkorb | Early Pliocene | | | An Ardeidae. | |
| Oxyura bessomi | Sp. nov. | valid | Howard | Middle Pleistocene | Palm Spring Formation | USA (California) | An Anatidae. | |
| Palaeeudyptes marplesi | Sp. nov. | valid | Brodkorb | Late Eocene | Burnside Marl | New Zealand | A Spheniscidae. | |
| Palaeostruthus eurius | Sp. nov. | valid | Brodkorb | Late Miocene | | | A Passerellidae. | |
| Paractitis | Gen et sp. nov. | valid | Weigel | Early Oligocene | Cypress Hills Formation | Canada (Saskatchewan) | A Scolopacidae, type sp. P. bardi | |
| Phalacrocorax ibericum | Sp. nov. | valid? | de Villalta Comella | Late Miocene | | Spain | A Phalacrocoracidae | |
| Phoeniconotius | Gen. et Sp. nov. | valid | Holmes Miller | Early Miocene | Etadunna Formation | Australia | A Phoenicopteridae, type sp. P. eyrensis | |
| Phoenicopterus novaehollandiae | Sp. nov. | valid | Holmes Miller | Early Miocene | Etadunna Formation | Australia | A Phoenicopteridae | |
| Podiceps dixi | Sp. nov. | valid | Brodkorb | Middle Pleistocene | | | A Podicipedidae | |
| Probalearica crataegensis | Gen. et Sp. nov. | synonym | Brodkorb | Early Miocene | Hawthorne Formation | USA (Florida) | A Gruidae, syn of Balearica crataegensis | |
| Propelargus olseni | Sp. nov. | synonym | Brodkorb | Early Miocene | Hawthorne Formation | USA (Florida) | A Ciconiidae, syn of Grallavis olseni. | |
| Puffinus micraulax | Sp. nov. | valid | Brodkorb | Early Miocene | Hawthorne Formation | USA (Florida) | A Sulidae. | |
| Sula universitatis | Sp. nov. | valid | Brodkorb | Early Miocene | Hawthorne Formation | USA (Florida) | A Sulidae. | |
| Titanis | Gen et sp. nov. | valid | Brodkorb | Late Blancan-Early Irvingtonian | | USA (Florida) | A Phorusrhacidae. Type sp. T. walleri | |
| Torotix clemensi | Gen et sp. nov. | valid | Brodkorb | Late Cretaceous | Lance Formation | USA (Wyoming) | Possibly a Pelecaniform, currently Aves Incertae Sedis. | |
| Totanus teruelensis | Sp. nov. | synonym | de Villalta Comella | Late Miocene | | Spain | A Laridae, syn of Larus teruelensis | |

== Popular culture ==
=== Literature ===
- Savage Pellucidar, the last of the seven novels about Pellucidar, an underground world inhabited by dinosaurs and other prehistoric creatures, by Edgar Rice Burroughs was published.
