= 1982 in paleontology =

Paleontology or palaeontology is the study of prehistoric life forms on Earth through the examination of plant and animal fossils. This includes the study of body fossils, tracks (ichnites), burrows, cast-off parts, fossilised feces (coprolites), palynomorphs and chemical residues. Because humans have encountered fossils for millennia, paleontology has a long history both before and after becoming formalized as a science. This article records significant discoveries and events related to paleontology that occurred or were published in the year 1982.

== Plants ==
=== Pteridophytes ===
Name	Novelty	Status	Authors	Age	Unit	Location	Notes	Images
Osmunda wehrii	Sp nov	Valid	Miller jr	Middle Miocene	Roza-Priest Rapids Basalts contact, Columbia River Basalt Group.	USA; Washington	A fern	

=== Angiosperms ===
Name	Novelty	Status	Authors	Age	Unit	Location	Notes	Images
Alangium oregonensis	Sp nov	valid	Scott & Wheeler	Middle Eocene	Clarno Formation	USA; Oregon	An Alangium wood species	
Betula clarnoensis	Sp nov	valid	Scott & Wheeler	Middle Eocene	Clarno Formation	USA; Oregon	A Betula wood species	
Cercidiphyllum alalongum	Sp nov	valid	Scott & Wheeler	Middle Eocene	Clarno Formation	USA; Oregon	A Cercidiphyllum wood species	
Fagaceoxylon	Gen et sp nov	valid	Scott & Wheeler	Middle Eocene	Clarno Formation	USA; Oregon	A Fagaceae wood genus. Type species F. ostryopsoides	
Liriodendroxylon multiporosum	Sp nov	valid	Scott & Wheeler	Middle Eocene	Clarno Formation	USA; Oregon	A Magnoliaceae wood species	
Magnolia angulata	Sp nov	valid	Scott & Wheeler	Middle Eocene	Clarno Formation	USA; Oregon	A Magnolia wood species	
Magnolia longiradiata	Sp nov	valid	Scott & Wheeler	Middle Eocene	Clarno Formation	USA; Oregon	A Magnolia wood species	
Quercinium crystallifera	Sp nov	valid	Scott & Wheeler	Middle Eocene	Clarno Formation	USA; Oregon	A Fagaceae wood species	
Ulminium scalariforme	Sp nov	valid	Scott & Wheeler	Middle Eocene	Clarno Formation	USA; Oregon	A Lauraceae wood species	
Trochodendron beckii	Comb nov	valid	(Hergert & Phinney) Scott & Wheeler	Middle Eocene	Clarno Formation	USA; Oregon	A Trochodendron wood species. New comb of Trochodendroxylon beckii Hergert & Phinney 1954	

== Fish ==
=== Ray-finned fish ===
Name	Novelty	Status	Authors	Age	Unit	Location	Notes	Images
"Amia" hesperia	Sp nov	Valid	Wilson	Early Eocene	Allenby Formation	Canada; British Columbia	A bowfin	Amia hesperia scale

== Archosauromorphs ==
=== Newly named dinosaurs ===
Data courtesy of George Olshevsky's dinosaur genera list.

Name	Novelty	Status	Authors	Age	Unit	Location	Notes	Images
Arstanosaurus	gen et sp nov	Nomen dubium.	Suslov; Shilin	Upper Cretaceous	Bostobinskaya Formation	Kazakhstan		Arstanosaurus
Dandakosaurus	gen et sp nov	Nomen dubium.	Yadagiri	Early Jurassic	Kota Formation	India		
Goyocephale	gen et sp nov	Valid	Perle, Maryańska, & Osmólska	Late Cretaceous	Unnamed unit	Mongolia		Goyocephale
Huayangosaurus	gen et sp nov	Valid taxon	Dong, Tang, & Zhou	Middle Jurassic	Lower Shaximiao Formation	China		Huayangosaurus
Hulsanpes	gen et sp nov	Valid taxon	Osmólska	Late Cretaceous	Barun Goyot Formation	Mongolia		
Pectinodon	gen et sp nov	Valid	Carpenter	Late Cretaceous	Lance Formation	USA	A troodontid.	
Tawasaurus	gen et sp nov	Valid taxon	Yang	Early Jurassic		China		
"Vectensia"	gen et sp nov	Nomen nudum	Delair	Early Cretaceous			Referred to Polacanthus.	

=== Birds ===
==== Some remarks on newly named birds ====
- Hulsanpes perlei Osmolska, 1982 was described as a Troodontidae, it is sometimes seen as an Avialae because of having a ginglymoid metatarsal II.

==== Newly named birds ====
Name	Status	Novelty	Authors	Age	Unit	Location	Notes	Images
Alectoris peii	Valid	Sp. nov.	Hou Lianhai	Early Pleistocene	Zhoukoudian	China	A Phasianidae.	
Ambiortus dementjevi	Valid	Gen. nov. et Sp. nov.	Evgeny N. Kurochkin	Early Cretaceous	Neocomian, Unduruhinskaya Formatie	Mongolia	An Enantiornithes Walker, 1981, Ambiortiformes Kurochkin, 1982. Ambiortidae Kurochkin, 1982, this is the type species of the new genus.	
Anhinga hadarensis	Valid	Sp. nov.	Pierce Brodkorb Cécile Mourer-Chauviré	Late Pliocene-Early Pleistocene	Hadar Formation, ± 3 My BP	Ethiopia	An Anhingidae.	
Athene cretensis	Valid	Sp. nov.	Peter D. M. Weesie	Late Pleistocene	Crete, MQ 2C	Greece	A Strigidae.	
Bantamyx georgicus	Valid	Gen. nov. et Sp. nov.	Evgeny N. Kurochkin	Late Miocene	Khirgis Nur Formation, Khirgis Nur 2	Mongolia	A Phasianidae, this is the type species of the new genus.	
Caspiodontornis kobystanicus	Valid	Gen. nov. et Sp. nov.	Sevil M. Aslanova Nikolay I. Burchak-Abramovich	Middle Oligocene	Maykopian Formation	Soviet Union: Azerbaijan	An Odontopterygiformes Howard, 1957, family Incertae Sedis, this is the type species of the new genus.	
Cepphus olsoni	Valid	Sp. nov.	Hildegarde Howard	Late Miocene	San Mateo Formation, San Luis Rey River Local Fauna	USA California	An Alcidae.	
Ciconia lucida	Valid	Sp. nov.	Evgeny N. Kurochkin	Middle Pliocene	Large Lakes Basin	Mongolia	A Ciconiidae.	
Columba congi	Valid	Sp. nov.	Hou Lianhai	Pleistocene	Zhoukoudian	China	A Columbidae.	
Crossoptilon jiai	Valid	Sp. nov.	Hou Lianhai	Pleistocene	Zhoukoudian	China	A Phasianidae.	
Ephippiorhynchus pakistanensis	Valid	Sp. nov.	Colin J. O. Harrison Cyril A. Walker	Late Miocene	Upper Dokh Pathan Formation, Siwalik Series	Pakistan	A Ciconiidae.	
Falco chowi	Valid	Sp. nov.	Hou Lianhai	Pleistocene	Zhoukoudian	China	A Falconidae.	
Gavia egeriana	Valid	Sp. nov.	Petr Švec	Early Miocene	MN 4b	Czechoslovakia	A Gaviidae.	
Lophura wayrei	Valid	Sp. nov.	Colin J. O. Harrison Cyril A. Walker	Late Miocene	Upper Nagri Formation, Chinji Formation, Siwalik Series	Pakistan	A Phasianidae.	
Minggangia changgouensis	Valid	Gen. nov. et Sp. nov.	Hou Lianhai	Late Eocene	Linzhuangqun	China	A Threskiornithidae, placed in Aves Incerta Sedis by Olson, 1982, this is the type species of the new genus.	
Miobaptus walteri	Valid	Gen. nov. et Sp. nov.	Petr Švec	Early Miocene	MN 4b	Czechoslovakia	A Podicipedidae, this is the type species of the new genus, Mlíkovský, 2000 transferred the species to the genus Podiceps.	
Ornimegalonyx acevedoi	Valid	Sp. nov.	Oscar Arredondo	Late Pleistocene	Cave deposits	Cuba	A Strigidae, probably a synonym of Ornimegalonyx oteroi Arredondo, 1958.	
Ornimegalonyx gigas	Valid	Sp. nov.	Oscar Arredondo	Late Pleistocene	Cave deposits	Cuba	A Strigidae, probably a synonym of Ornimegalonyx oteroi Arredondo, 1958.	
Ornimegalonyx minor	Valid	Sp. nov.	Oscar Arredondo	Late Pleistocene	Cave deposits	Cuba	A Strigidae, probably a synonym of Ornimegalonyx oteroi Arredondo, 1958.	
Palaeopsittacus georgei	Valid	Gen. nov. et Sp. nov.	Colin J. O. Harrison	Early Eocene	London Clay MP 8	UK: England	Described as a Psittacidae, transferred by Mourer-Chauviré in 1992 to the Quercypsittidae, placed in Aves Incertae Sedis by Mayr et Daniels 1998, Mayr 2009 thought it might be a Fluvioviridavidae G. Mayr, 2005, this is the type species of the new genus.	
Paludiavis richae	Valid	Gen. nov. et Sp. nov.	Colin J. O. Harrison Cyril A. Walker	Late Miocene	Siwalik Series	Pakistan	A possible Balaenicipitidae, this is the type species of the new genus.	
Parvulivenator watteli	Valid	Gen. nov. et Sp. nov.	Colin J. O. Harrison	Early Eocene	London Clay MP 8	UK: England	Described as a Falconidae, but Mlíkovský 2002 placed it in Aves Incertae Sedis, this is the type species of the new genus.	
Physornis brasiliensis	Valid	Sp. nov.	Herculano M. F. de Alvarenga	Late Oligocene or Early Miocene	Upper Deseadean, Tremembé Formation	Brazil	A Gruiformes, Phorusrhacidae Ameghino, 1889, Brontornitinae Moreno et Mercerat, 1891, in 1993 Alvarenga mede it the type species of his new genus Paraphysornis.	
Pleotis liui	Valid	Gen. nov. et Sp. nov.	Hou Lianhai	Pleistocene	Zhoukoudian	China	An Otididae, this is the type species of the new genus.	
Porphyrio parvus	Valid	Sp. nov.	Colin J. O. Harrison Cyril A. Walker	Late Miocene	Upper Nagri Formatie, Siwalik Series	Pakistan	A Rallidae.	
Tachornis uranoceles	Valid	Sp. nov.	Storrs L. Olson	Pleistocene	Cave deposits	Puerto Rico	An Apodidae.	
Uria paleohesperis	Valid	Sp. nov.	Hildegarde Howard	Late Miocene	San Mateo Formation San Luis Rey River Local Fauna	USA California	An Alcidae.	
Urmiornis cracrafti	Valid	Sp. nov.	Colin J. O. Harrison Cyril A. Walker	Late Miocene	Near Kadirpur	Pakistan	A Gruiformes, Ergilornithidae Kozlova, 1960. According to Karhu, 1997 not an Ergilornithidae. Olson, 1985 and Kurochkin, 1985 place the species in the genus Amphipelargus Lydekker, 1891.	

== Plesiosaurs ==
=== New taxa ===
Name	Novelty	Status	Authors	Age	Unit	Location	Notes	Images
Bathyspondylus	gen et sp nov	Valid	Delair	Kimmeridgian		England		

== Pterosaurs ==
=== New taxa ===
Name	Novelty	Status	Authors	Age	Unit	Location	Notes	Images
Huanhepterus	gen et sp nov	Valid	Dong	Late Jurassic	Huachihuanhe Formation	China		

== Pseudosuchia ==
=== General pseudosuchian research ===
- Ralph Molnar publishes a revision of the genus Pallimnarchus, comparing it to various Australasian crocodilians and diagnosing it based on proportional differences.

=== New taxa ===
Name	Novelty	Status	Authors	Age	Unit	Location	Notes	Images
Dianchungosaurus	gen et sp nov	valid	Yang Z. J.	Sinemurian	Lufeng Formation	China	First described as a dinosaur	
Trialestes	gen et sp nov	Valid	Bonaparte	Late Triassic	Ischigualasto Formation	Argentina	Sphenosuchian	
