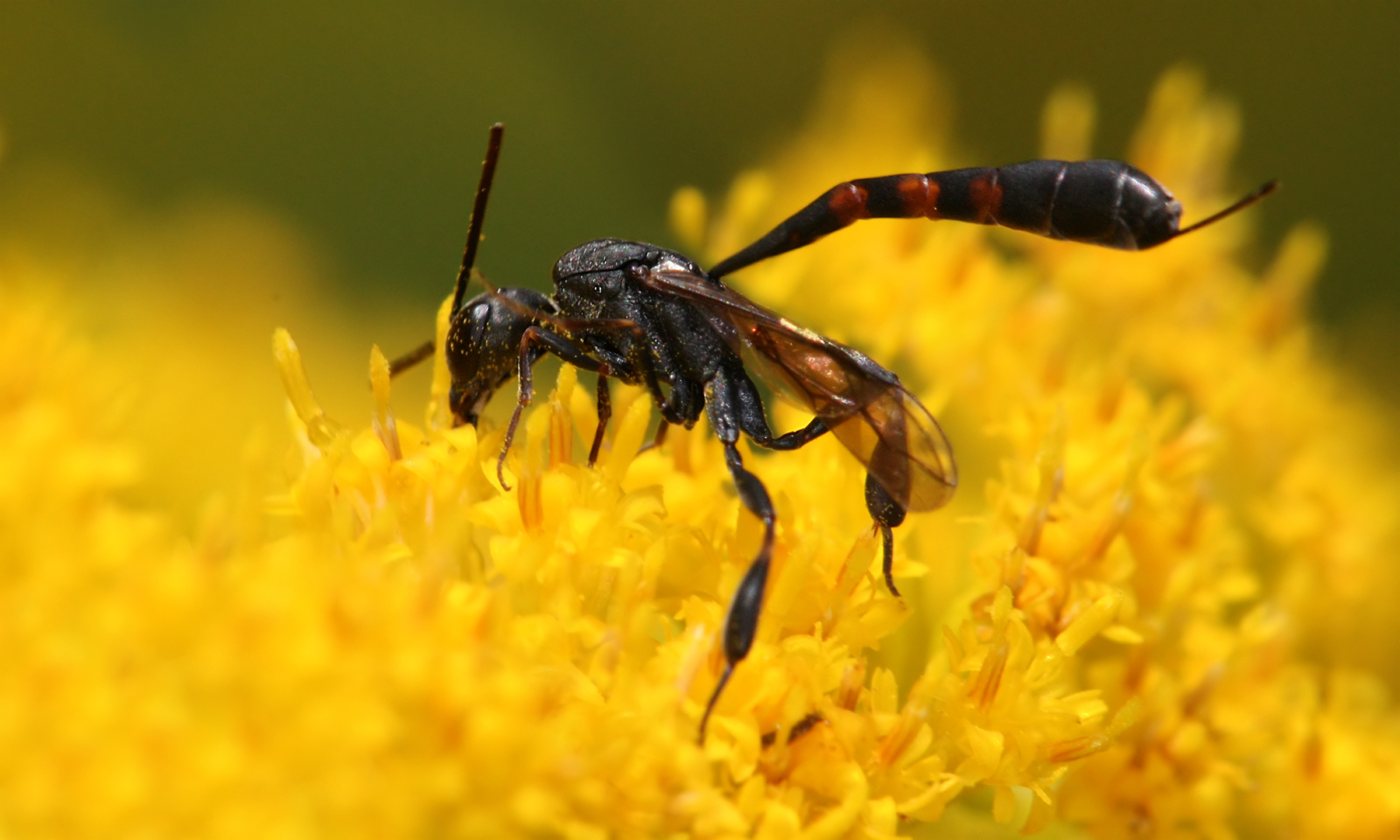

Scientific classification
- Kingdom: Animalia
- Phylum: Arthropoda
- Class: Insecta
- Order: Hymenoptera
- Family: Gasteruptiidae
- Genus: Gasteruption
- Species: G. assectator

Binomial name
- Gasteruption assectator (Linnaeus, 1758)

= Gasteruption assectator =

Species of wasp

Gasteruption assectator, the wild carrot wasp, is a species of carrot wasp in the family Gasteruptiidae. It is found in the Czech Republic, Slovakia, and Hungary. G. assectator is a generalist inquiline parasitoid of many other bee and wasp species such as Hylaeus confusus, Hylaeus pectoralis, and Pemphredon fabricii.

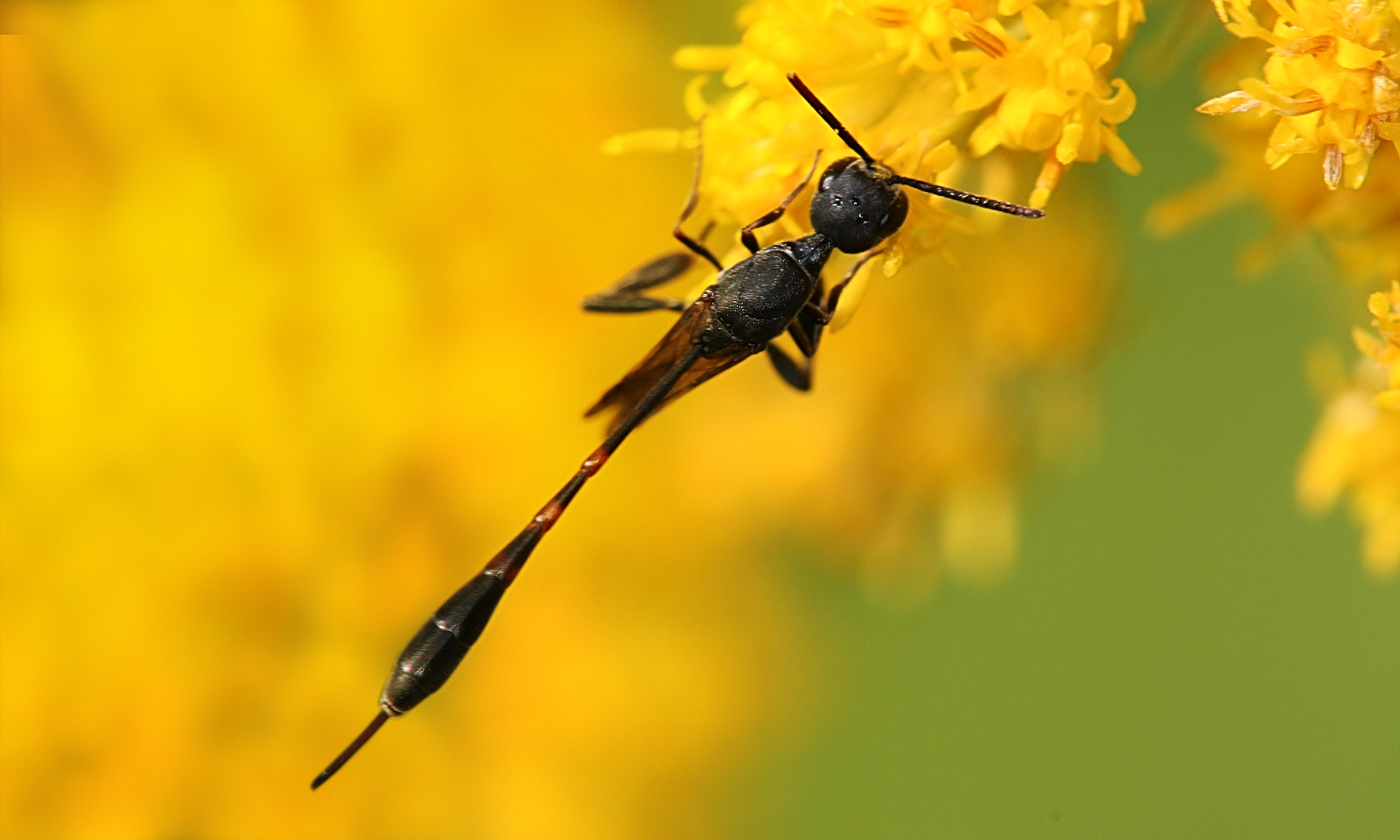

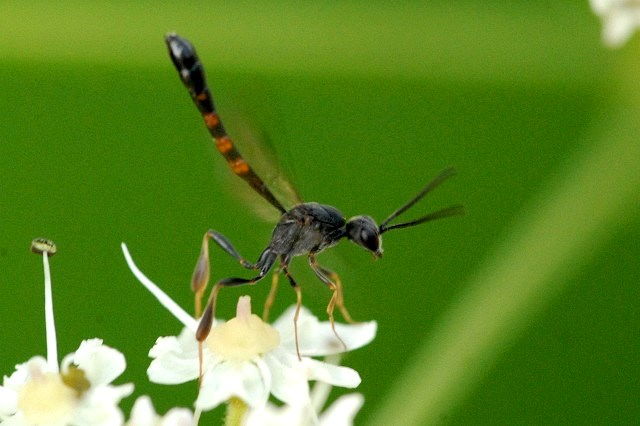
