= Ambiortus =

Ambiortus Temporal range: Early Cretaceous, 130 Ma

Scientific classification
- Kingdom: Animalia
- Phylum: Chordata
- Class: Reptilia
- Clade: Dinosauria
- Clade: Saurischia
- Clade: Theropoda
- Clade: Avialae
- Clade: †Ambiortiformes
- Family: †Ambiortidae; Kurochkin, 1982
- Genus: †Ambiortus; Kurochkin, 1982
- Species: †A. dementjevi

Binomial name
- †Ambiortus dementjevi Kurochkin, 1982

Extinct genus of dinosaurs

Ambiortus is an extinct genus of ornithuromorph dinosaurs. The only known species, Ambiortus dementjevi, lived sometime during the Barremian age between 136.4 and 125 million years ago in the Andaikhudag Formation of Mongolia. It was discovered by Yevgeny Kurochkin in 1982.

== Classification ==
Ambiortus dementjevi belongs to Ornithuromorpha, the natural group containing modern birds but not Enantiornithes, according to all published cladistic analyses. The exact position of the species within this group has been controversial. Early studies suggested it was a member of Palaeognathae, the group containing modern ratites and tinamou, but this has not been supported by later research. Some studies have found it to be closely related to the Ichthyornithes, a relatively derived group closely related to modern birds.

Most analyses have found it to be either an unresolved member of the Ornithurae, or a more basal member of Ornithuromorpha. One 2006 study, for example, found it to be more primitive than Yanornis but more advanced than Hongshanornis, or even a member of the specific group containing both Yanornis and Yixianornis.

The family Ambiortidae is sometimes used for this genus, especially if it is considered a close relative of the much younger Apsaravis. The results of a cladistic analysis published in 2011 indicate that at least Apsaravis and Palintropus, which was initially mistaken as a more modern bird genus initially, are very closely related.
