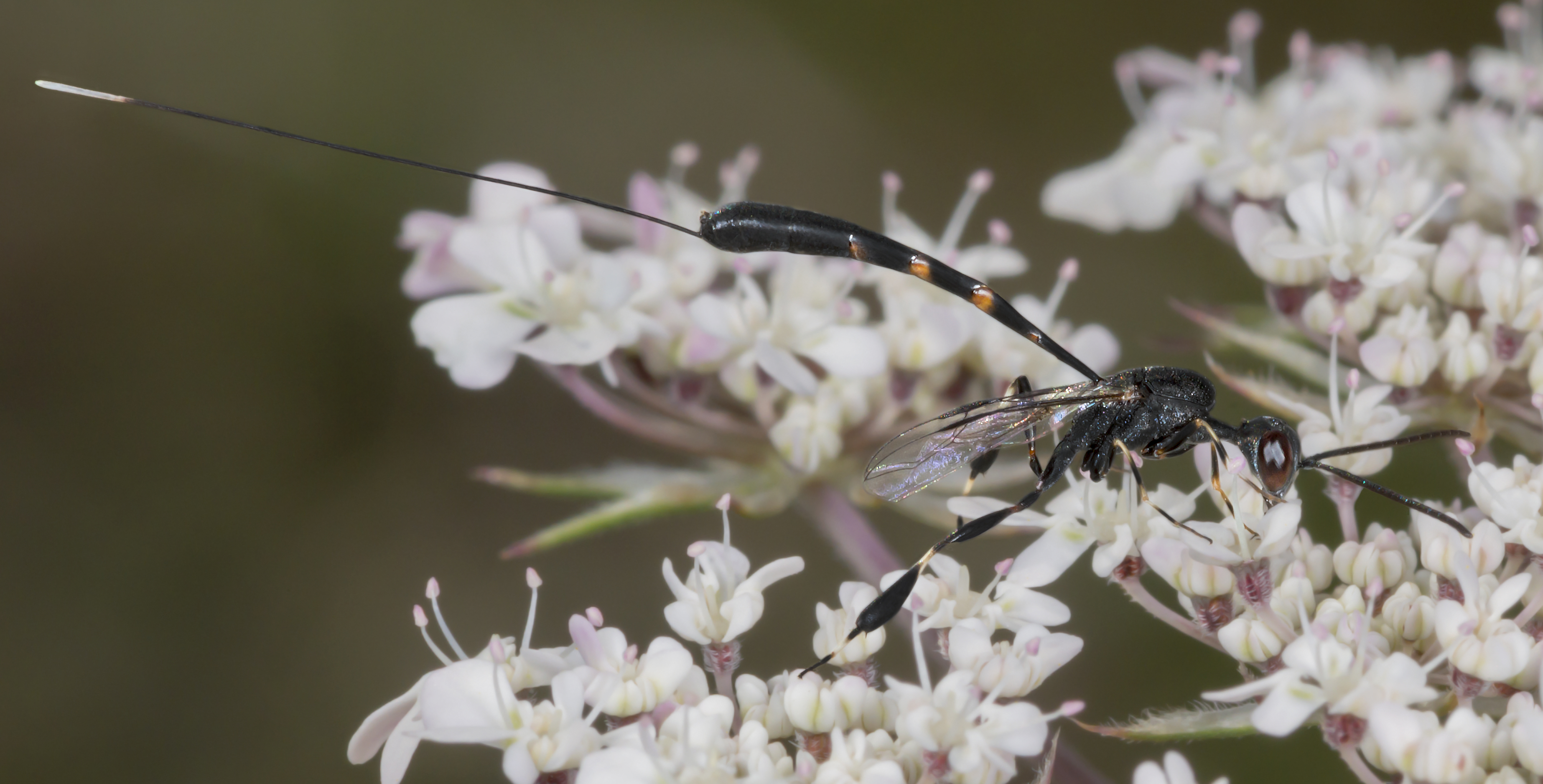
- Female

Scientific classification
- Kingdom: Animalia
- Phylum: Arthropoda
- Clade: Pancrustacea
- Class: Insecta
- Order: Hymenoptera
- Family: Gasteruptiidae
- Genus: Gasteruption
- Species: G. jaculator

Binomial name
- Gasteruption jaculator (Linnaeus, 1758)

Synonyms
- Ichneumon jaculator Linnaeus, 1758; Gasteruption granulithorax (Tournier, 1877)

= Gasteruption jaculator =

Species of wasp

Gasteruption jaculator, or Javelin Wasp, is a species of wasp in the family Gasteruptiidae.

== Distribution ==
This species is mainly present in Austria, Belgium, Great Britain, Czech Republic, Finland, France, Germany, Greece, Hungary, Italy, Poland, Romania, Russia, Slovakia, Spain, Sweden, Switzerland, in the eastern Palearctic realm, and in the Near East.

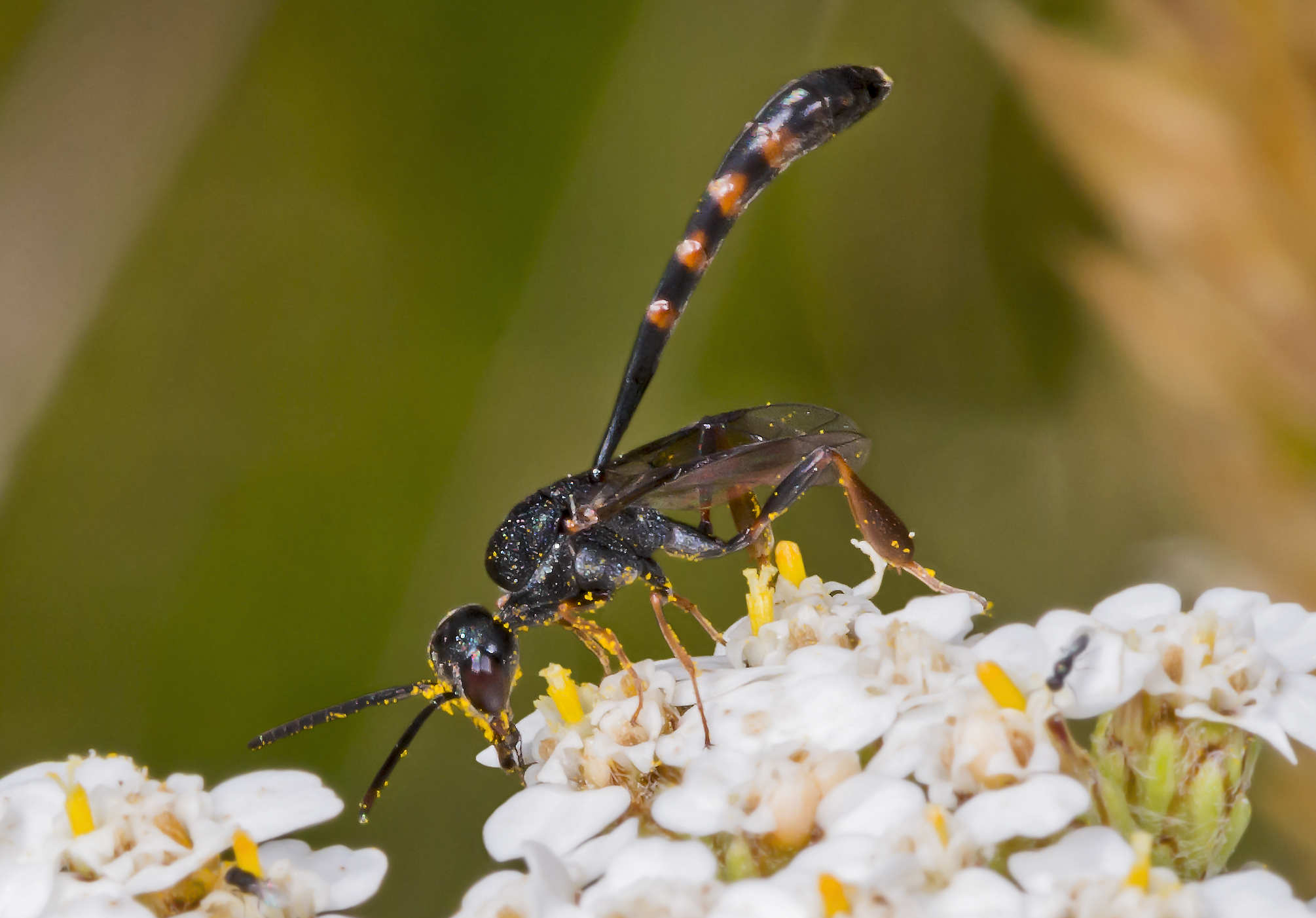
Male Gasteruption jaculator

== Description ==
The head and thorax are completely black. The head is strongly rounded, the thorax is elongated in a sort of long neck (propleura), which separates the head from the body. Also the abdomen is strongly stretched, broader at the posterior end and placed on the upper chest (propodeum). The abdomen is black, with reddish-orange rings. The tibiae of the hind legs are club shaped. In the female the ovipositor is usually very long with a white tip. In resting position, these wasps slowly and rhythmically raise and lower the abdomen.

== Life cycle ==
The female of this parasitic wasp lays its eggs on the body of larvae of solitary bees or wasps using its long ovipositor. Upon hatching, its larvae will devour grubs and its victim's supplies of pollen and nectar. The adults grow up to 10–17 millimetres (0.39–0.67 in) long and can mostly be encountered from May through September feeding on Apiaceae species.

== Habitat ==
Gasteruption jaculator has been found visiting various flowers, or hovering around the nests of solitary bees and wasps in gardens and meadows. The species is commonly found during May to September.
