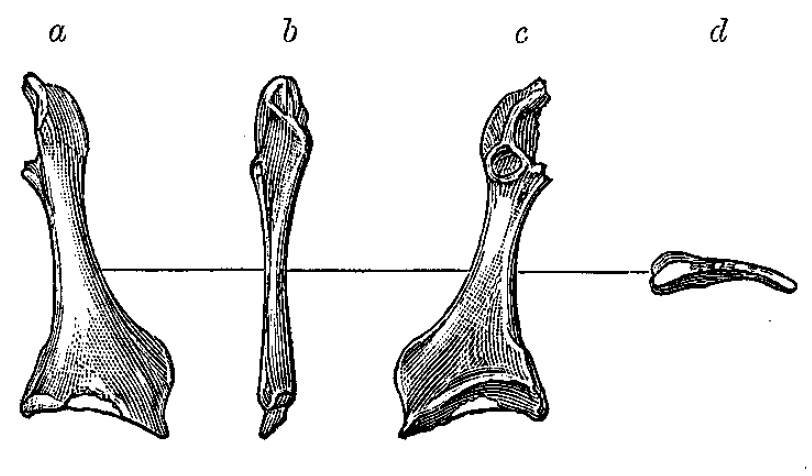
- Left coracoid of a Cimolopteryx rara

Scientific classification
- Kingdom: Animalia
- Phylum: Chordata
- Class: Reptilia
- Clade: Dinosauria
- Clade: Saurischia
- Clade: Theropoda
- Clade: Avialae
- Clade: Ornithurae
- Family: †Cimolopterygidae; Brodkorb, 1963

Type species
- †Cimolopteryx rara Marsh, 1892

Genera
- †Ceramornis; †Cimolopteryx; †Lamarqueavis

= Cimolopterygidae =

Cimolopterygidae Temporal range: Late Cretaceous, 75–66 Ma

Extinct family of dinosaurs

Cimolopterygidae is an extinct family of ornithuran dinosaurs known from the Late Cretaceous epoch. Remains attributed to cimolopterygids have been found in the Frenchman Formation of Saskatchewan, the Lance Formation of Wyoming, the Fox Hills Formation of Colorado, the Hell Creek Formation of Montana, and the Allen Formation of Rio Negro, Argentina. Most date to the end of the Maastrichtian age, about 66 million years ago, though a much earlier species has also been identified from the Campanian-aged Dinosaur Park Formation of Alberta, about 75 million years ago.
