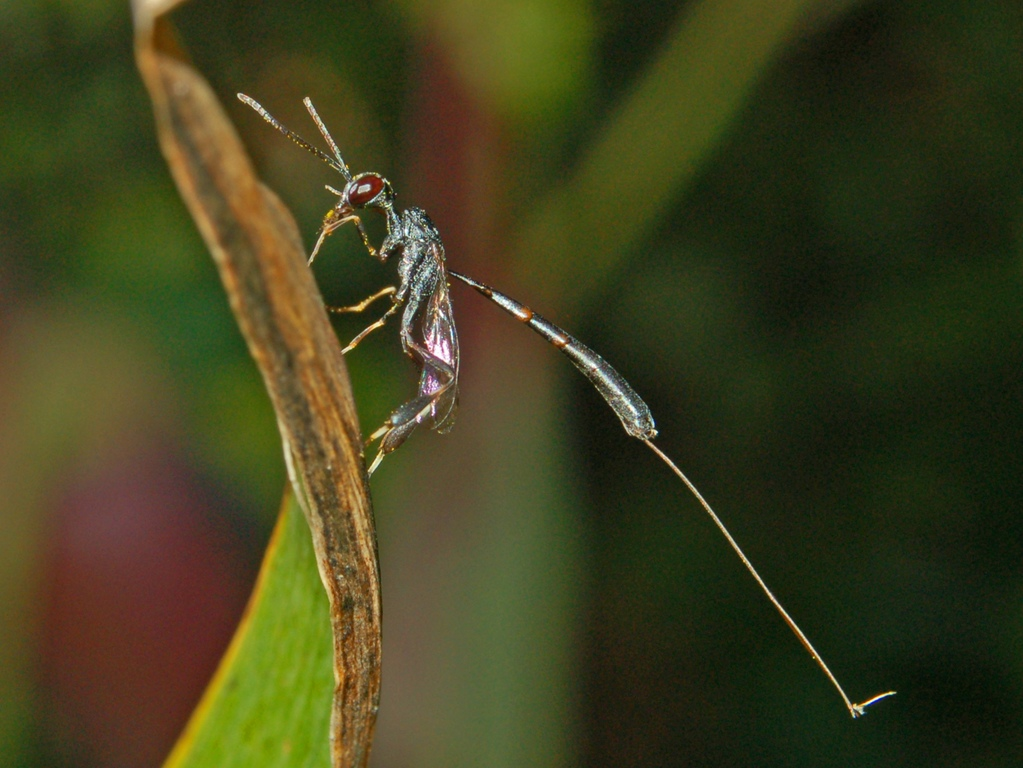
- Gasteruption jaculator

Scientific classification
- Kingdom: Animalia
- Phylum: Arthropoda
- Class: Insecta
- Order: Hymenoptera
- Family: Gasteruptiidae
- Genus: Gasteruption; Latreille, 1796

Synonyms
- Foenus Fabricius, 1798; Gasteruptron Westwood, 1840; Gastryptium Agassiz, 1846; Faenus Abeille de Perrin, 1879; Gasteryption Schletterer, 1890; Phoenus Schletterer, 1890; Gasteruptia Dominique, 1893; Gasteruptium Schulz, 1906; Rhydinofoenus Bradley, 1909; Dolichofoenus Kieffer, 1910; Trichofoenus Kieffer, 1910; Gastrhyptium Schulz, 1911

= Gasteruption =

Genus of wasps

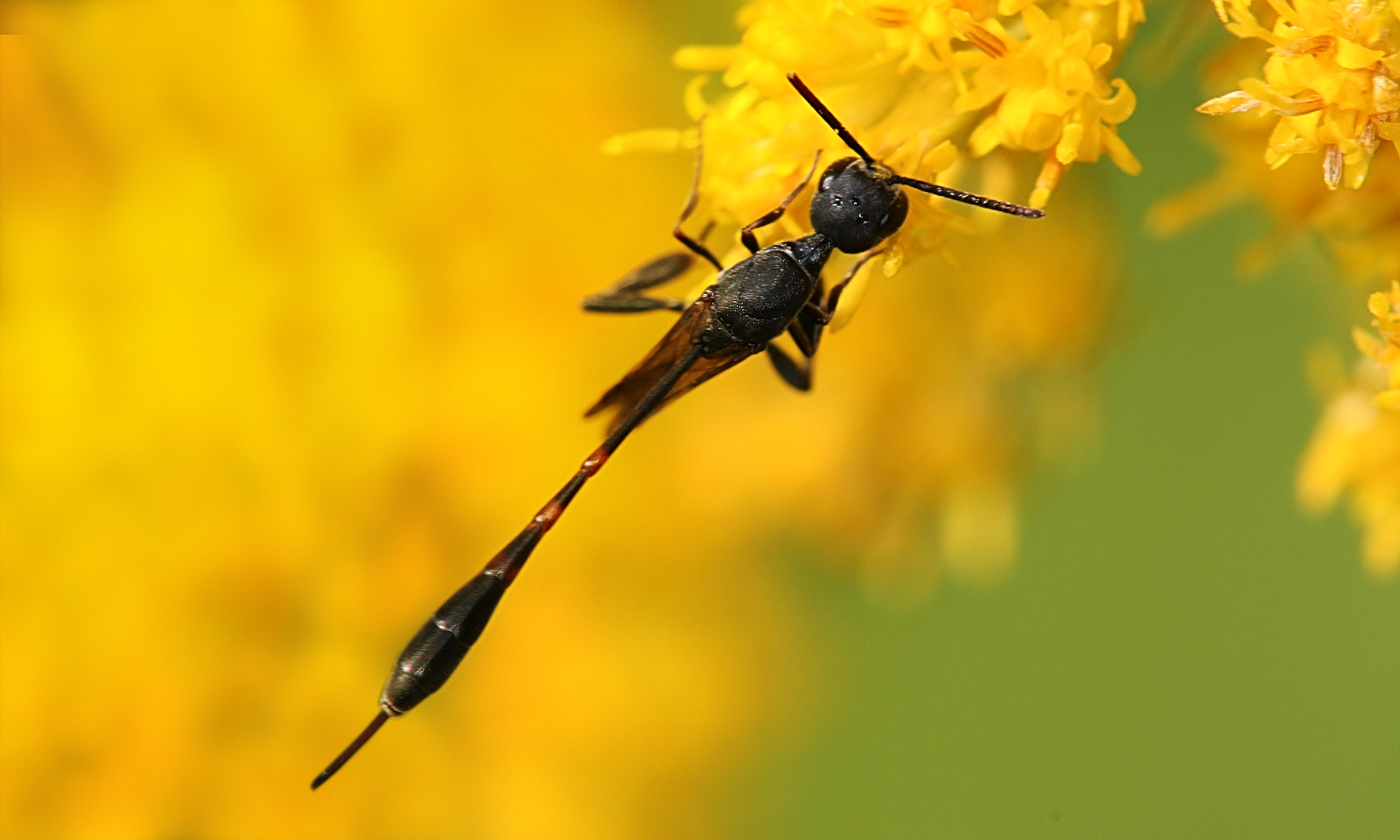
Gasteruption assectator

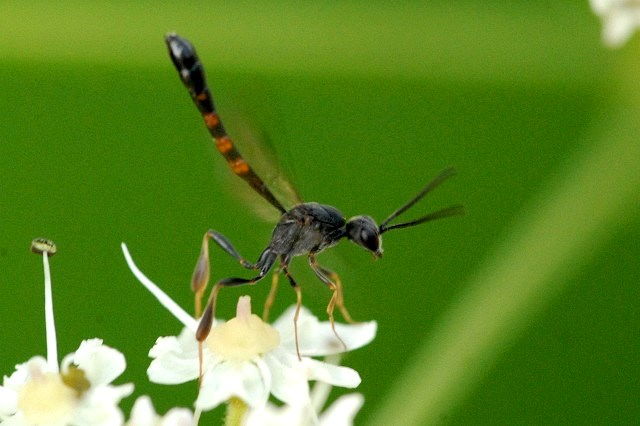
Gasteruption assectator

Gasteruption is a genus of wasps belonging to the family Gasteruptiidae subfamily Gasteruptiinae.

== World species ==
These 64 species belong to the genus Gasteruption:

- Gasteruption assectator (Linnaeus, 1758)^{g b} (wild carrot wasp)
- Gasteruption boreale (Thomson, 1883)^{g}
- Gasteruption canariae Madl, 1991^{g}
- Gasteruption caucasicum (Guerin-Meneville, 1844)^{g}
- Gasteruption corniculigerum Enderlein, 1913^{g}
- Gasteruption dilutum Semenov, 1892^{g}
- Gasteruption dimidiatum Semenov, 1892^{g}
- Gasteruption diversipes (Abeille de Perrin, 1879)^{g}
- Gasteruption dolichoderum Schletterer, 1889^{g}
- Gasteruption erythrostomum (Dahlbom, 1831)^{g}
- Gasteruption expectatum Pasteels, 1957^{c g}
- Gasteruption fallaciosum Semenov, 1892^{g}
- Gasteruption flavicuspis Kieffer, 1911^{c g}
- Gasteruption floreum Szepligeti, 1903^{g}
- Gasteruption formilis Alekseev, 1995^{g}
- Gasteruption formosanum Enderlein, 1913^{g}
- Gasteruption forticorne Semenov, 1892^{g}
- Gasteruption foveiceps Semenov, 1892^{g}
- Gasteruption freyi (Tournier, 1877)^{g}
- Gasteruption goberti (Tournier, 1877)^{g}
- Gasteruption hastator (Fabricius, 1804)^{g}
- Gasteruption hungaricum Szepligeti, 1895^{g}
- Gasteruption ignoratum Kieffer, 1903^{g}
- Gasteruption insidiosum Semenow, 1892^{g}
- Gasteruption jaculator (Linnaeus, 1758)^{g}
- Gasteruption japonicum Cameron, 1888^{g}
- Gasteruption kaweahense^{b}
- Gasteruption lacoulee Jennings, Krogmann & Parslow, 2015^{g}
- Gasteruption laticeps (Tournier, 1877)^{g}
- Gasteruption lugubre Schletterer, 1889^{g}
- Gasteruption maquis Jennings, Krogmann & Parslow, 2015^{g}
- Gasteruption merceti Kieffer, 1904^{g}
- Gasteruption minutum (Tournier, 1877)^{g}
- Gasteruption nigrescens Schletterer, 1885^{g}
- Gasteruption nigritarse Thomson, 1883^{g}
- Gasteruption opacum (Tournier, 1877)^{g}
- Gasteruption oriplanum Kieffer, 1911^{g}
- Gasteruption ortegae Madl, 1991^{g}
- Gasteruption oshimense Watanabe, 1934^{g}
- Gasteruption parvicollarium Enderlein, 1913^{g}
- Gasteruption paternum Schletterer, 1889^{g}
- Gasteruption pedemontanum (Tournier, 1877)^{g}
- Gasteruption phragmiticola Saure, 2006^{g}
- Gasteruption poecilothecum Kieffer, 1911^{g}
- Gasteruption psilomma Kieffer, 1904^{g}
- Gasteruption rufescenticorne Enderlein, 1913^{g}
- Gasteruption sarramea Jennings, Krogmann & Parslow, 2015^{g}
- Gasteruption schlettereri Magretti, 1890^{g}
- Gasteruption schossmannae Madl, 1987^{g}
- Gasteruption scintillans Pasteels, 1957^{c g}
- Gasteruption sinarum Kieffer, 1911^{g}
- Gasteruption sinepunctatum Zhao, van Achterberg & Xu, 2012^{g}
- Gasteruption sinicola^{g}
- Gasteruption striatum^{b}
- Gasteruption subtile (Thomson, 1883)^{g}
- Gasteruption syriacum Szepligeti, 1903^{g}
- Gasteruption terebrelligerum Enderlein, 1913^{g}
- Gasteruption tonkinense Pasteels, 1958^{g}
- Gasteruption tournieri Schletterer, 1885^{g}
- Gasteruption transversiceps Pasteels, 1958^{g}
- Gasteruption undulatum (Abeille de Perrin, 1879)^{g}
- Gasteruption variolosum (Abeille de Perrin, 1879)^{g}
- Gasteruption varipes (Westwood, 1851)^{g}
- Gasteruption visaliae^{b}

Data sources: i = ITIS, c = Catalogue of Life, g = GBIF, b = Bugguide.net
