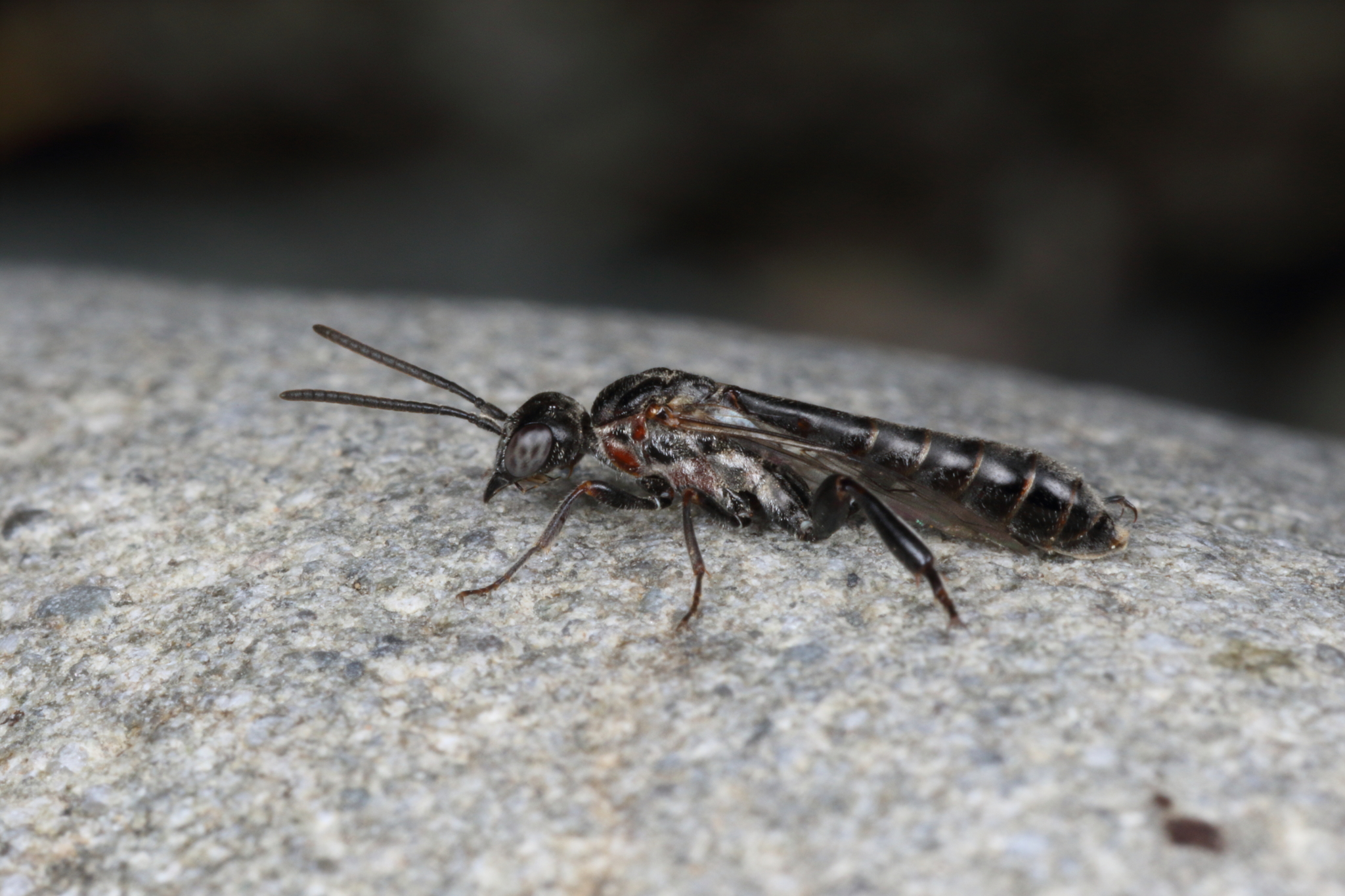
- Pseudofoenus, New Zealand

Scientific classification
- Kingdom: Animalia
- Phylum: Arthropoda
- Class: Insecta
- Order: Hymenoptera
- Family: Gasteruptiidae
- Subfamily: Hyptiogastrinae
- Genus: Pseudofoenus; Kieffer, 1902

Synonyms
- Aulacofoenus Kieffer, 1911; Crassifoenus Crosskey, 1953; Eufoenus Szépligeti, 1903; Hemifoenus Kieffer, 1911; Trigonofoenus Kieffer, 1911

= Pseudofoenus =

Genus of wasps

Pseudofoenus is a genus in the family Gasteruptiidae. There are some 76 described species in Pseudofoenus which has a restricted Gondwanan distribution and is found in Australia, New Guinea and New Britain, the south-west Pacific (New Caledonia, New Hebrides and Fiji), New Zealand and South America.

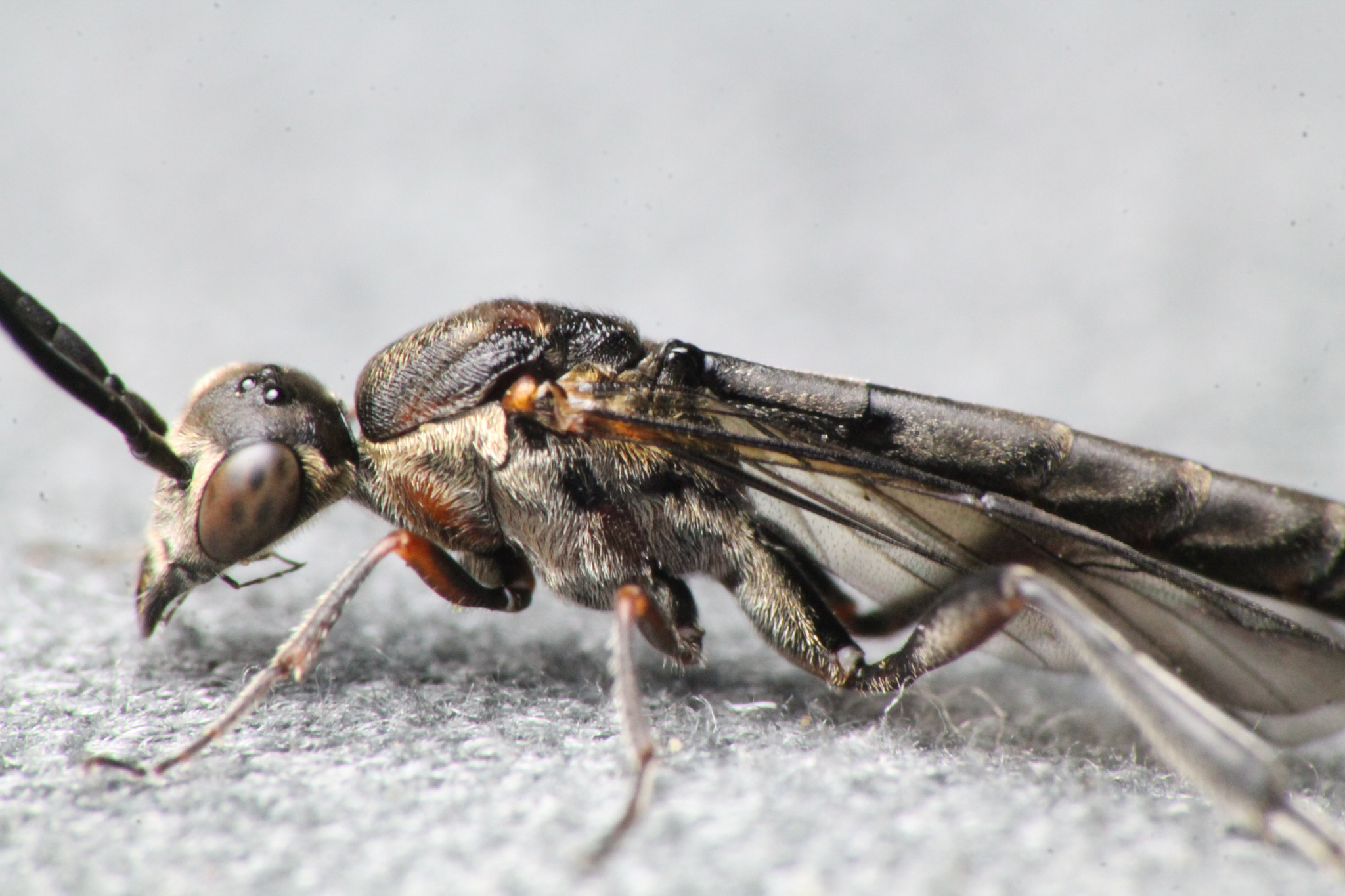
Pseudofoenus, New Zealand

== Species ==
These 76 species belong to the genus Pseudofoenus:

Pseudofoenus albicoleus Parslow & Jennings, 2020
Pseudofoenus antennalis (Schletterer, 1889)
Pseudofoenus australis (Westwood, 1835)
Pseudofoenus baileyi Jennings & Austin, 2002
Pseudofoenus baitetaensis Jennings & Austin, 2002
Pseudofoenus beverlyae Jennings & Austin, 2002
Pseudofoenus bungeyi (Jennings & Austin, 1997)
Pseudofoenus caledonicus Jennings & Austin, 2005
Pseudofoenus caperatus Jennings & Austin, 2002
Pseudofoenus cardaleae Jennings & Austin, 2002
Pseudofoenus carrabinensis Jennings & Austin, 2002
Pseudofoenus claireae Jennings & Austin, 2002
Pseudofoenus collessi Jennings & Austin, 2002
Pseudofoenus coorowensis Jennings & Austin, 2002
Pseudofoenus crassipes (Smith, 1876)
Pseudofoenus crassitarsis (Kieffer, 1907)
Pseudofoenus crosskeyi Jennings & Austin, 2002
Pseudofoenus darwini (Westwood, 1841)
Pseudofoenus deletangi (Schletterer, 1893)
Pseudofoenus douglasorum Jennings & Austin, 2002
Pseudofoenus eliseae Jennings & Austin, 2002
Pseudofoenus ericae Jennings & Austin, 2002
Pseudofoenus eustonensis Jennings & Austin, 2002
Pseudofoenus extraneus (Turner, 1918)
Pseudofoenus fallax (Schletterer, 1889)
Pseudofoenus feckneri Jennings & Austin, 2002
Pseudofoenus ferrugineus (Crosskey, 1953)
Pseudofoenus fletcheri (Jennings & Austin, 1997)
Pseudofoenus floricolus (Turner, 1918)
Pseudofoenus goonooensis (Jennings & Austin, 1997)
Pseudofoenus grossitarsis (Kieffer, 1911)
Pseudofoenus gullanae Jennings & Austin, 2002
Pseudofoenus hackeri Jennings & Austin, 2002
Pseudofoenus houstoni (Jennings & Austin, 1994)
Pseudofoenus imbicatus Jennings & Austin, 2002
Pseudofoenus inaequalis (Turner, 1918)
Pseudofoenus infumatus (Schletterer, 1889)
Pseudofoenus iqbali Jennings & Austin, 2002
Pseudofoenus kadowi Jennings & Austin, 2002
Pseudofoenus kelleri Jennings & Austin, 2002
Pseudofoenus kurmondi (Jennings & Austin, 1997)
Pseudofoenus leinsterensis Jennings & Austin, 2002
Pseudofoenus loxleyi Jennings & Austin, 1997
Pseudofoenus macdonaldi Jennings & Austin, 2002
Pseudofoenus macronyx (Schletterer, 1889)
Pseudofoenus malkini Jennings & Austin, 2002
Pseudofoenus marionae (Jennings & Austin, 1997)
Pseudofoenus marshalli Jennings & Austin, 2002
Pseudofoenus masneri Jennings & Austin, 2002
Pseudofoenus melanopleurus (Crosskey, 1956)
Pseudofoenus microcephalus (Crosskey, 1953)
Pseudofoenus minimus (Turner, 1918)
Pseudofoenus mitchellae Jennings & Austin, 2002
Pseudofoenus morganensis Jennings & Austin, 2002
Pseudofoenus nalbarraensis Jennings & Austin, 2002
Pseudofoenus nitidiusculus (Turner, 1918)
Pseudofoenus nocticolor Kieffer, 1911
Pseudofoenus patellatus (Westwood, 1851)
Pseudofoenus pedunculatus (Schletterer, 1889)
Pseudofoenus perenjorii (Jennings & Austin, 1997)
Pseudofoenus pilosus (Kieffer, 1911)
Pseudofoenus pumilis Jennings & Austin, 2002
Pseudofoenus reticulatus (Crosskey, 1956)
Pseudofoenus rieki (Crosskey, 1956)
Pseudofoenus ritae (Cheesman, 1936)
Pseudofoenus spinitarsis (Westwood, 1851)
Pseudofoenus stevensi Jennings & Austin, 2002
Pseudofoenus swani (Jennings & Austin, 1997)
Pseudofoenus tasmaniensis Jennings & Austin, 2002
Pseudofoenus taylori Jennings & Austin, 2002
Pseudofoenus thoracicus (Guérin-Méneville, 1843)
Pseudofoenus unguiculatus (Westwood, 1841)
Pseudofoenus walkeri Jennings & Austin, 2002
Pseudofoenus whiani (Jennings & Austin, 1997)
Pseudofoenus wubinensis (Jennings & Austin, 1997)
Pseudofoenus zborowskii Jennings & Austin, 2002
