= Ceramornis =

Ceramornis Temporal range: Late Cretaceous, 66 Ma

Scientific classification
- Kingdom: Animalia
- Phylum: Chordata
- Class: Reptilia
- Clade: Dinosauria
- Clade: Saurischia
- Clade: Theropoda
- Clade: Avialae
- Family: †Cimolopterygidae
- Genus: †Ceramornis; Brodkorb, 1963
- Species: †C. major

Binomial name
- †Ceramornis major Brodkorb, 1963

Extinct genus of dinosaurs

Ceramornis is a genus of ornithuran dinosaurs from the Late Cretaceous. It lived shortly before the Cretaceous–Paleogene extinction event in the Maastrichtian, some 66 million years ago (mya). Its remains were found in the Lull 2 location, a Lance Formation site in Niobrara County, Wyoming. A single species is known, Ceramornis major, and even that only from a proximal piece of coracoid. This is specimen UCMP V53957, which was collected by a University of California team in 1958.

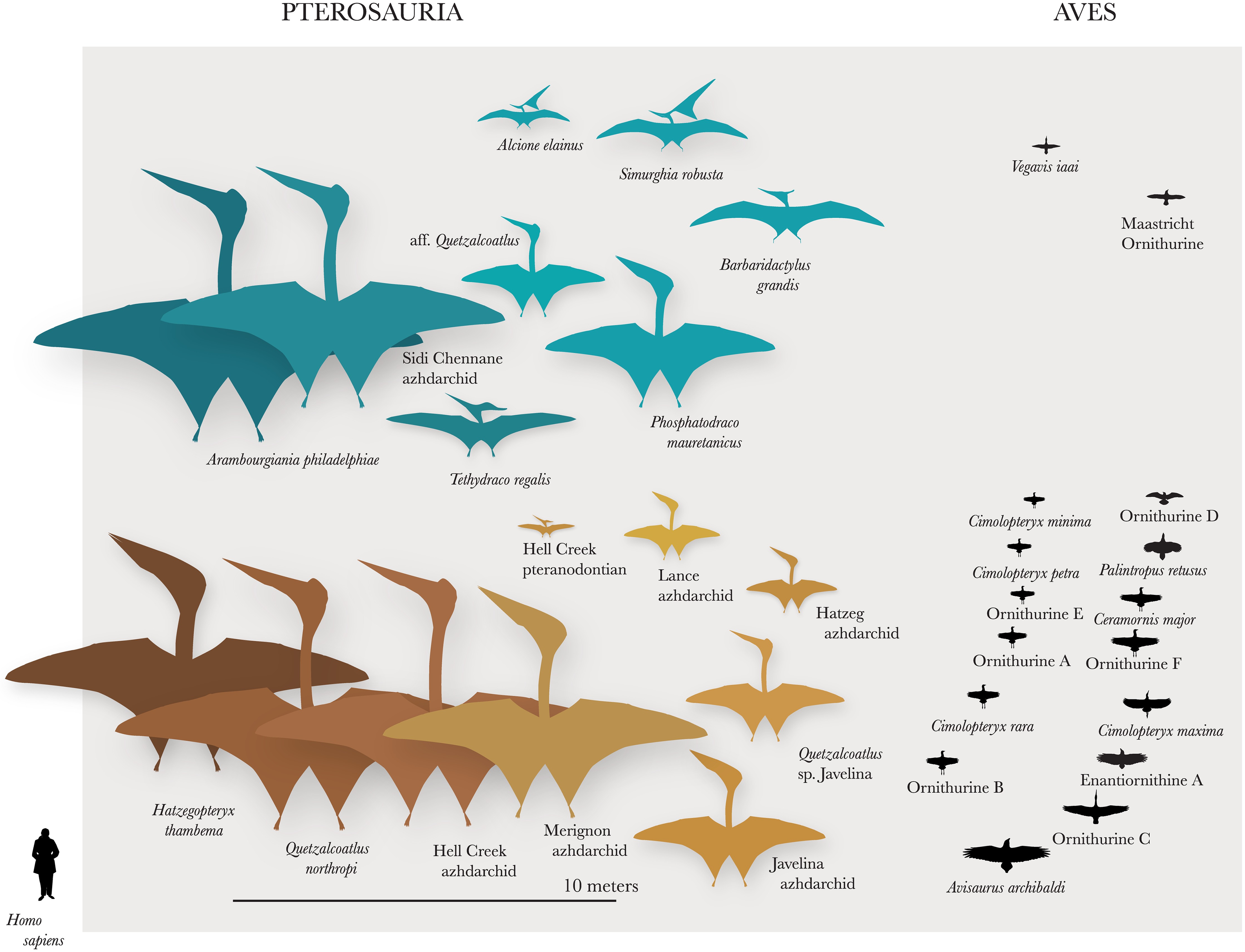
Size (lower middle right) compared to contemporary birds, pterosaurs, and a human

Ceramornis has been placed in the family Cimolopterygidae together with Cimolopteryx and Lamarqueavis. Cimolopterygidae has sometimes been placed in the modern bird order Charadriiformes, based on quantitative analysis of its coracoid and comparison with other modern bird samples. However, there remains some uncertainty about the taxonomic position, as there is insufficient fossil material to be assessed by wide-scale cladistic analysis.

It is not certain that Charadriiformes was already distinct by the Maastrichtian.
