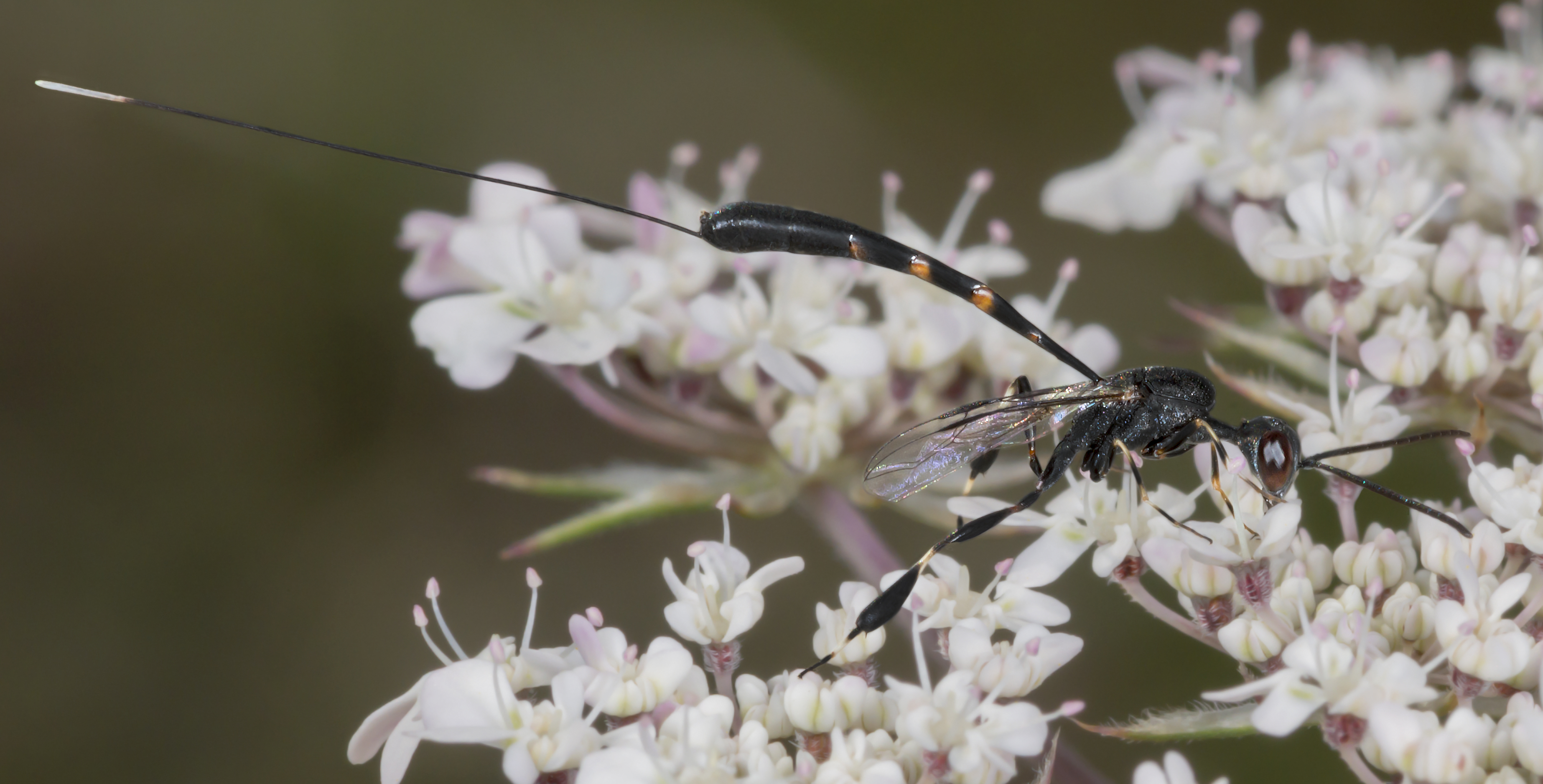
- Gasteruption jaculator

Scientific classification
- Kingdom: Animalia
- Phylum: Arthropoda
- Class: Insecta
- Order: Hymenoptera
- Superfamily: Evanioidea
- Family: Gasteruptiidae; Ashmead, 1900

Subfamilies and genera
- See text

= Gasteruptiidae =

Gasteruptiidae Temporal range: Cretaceous–Present

Family of wasps

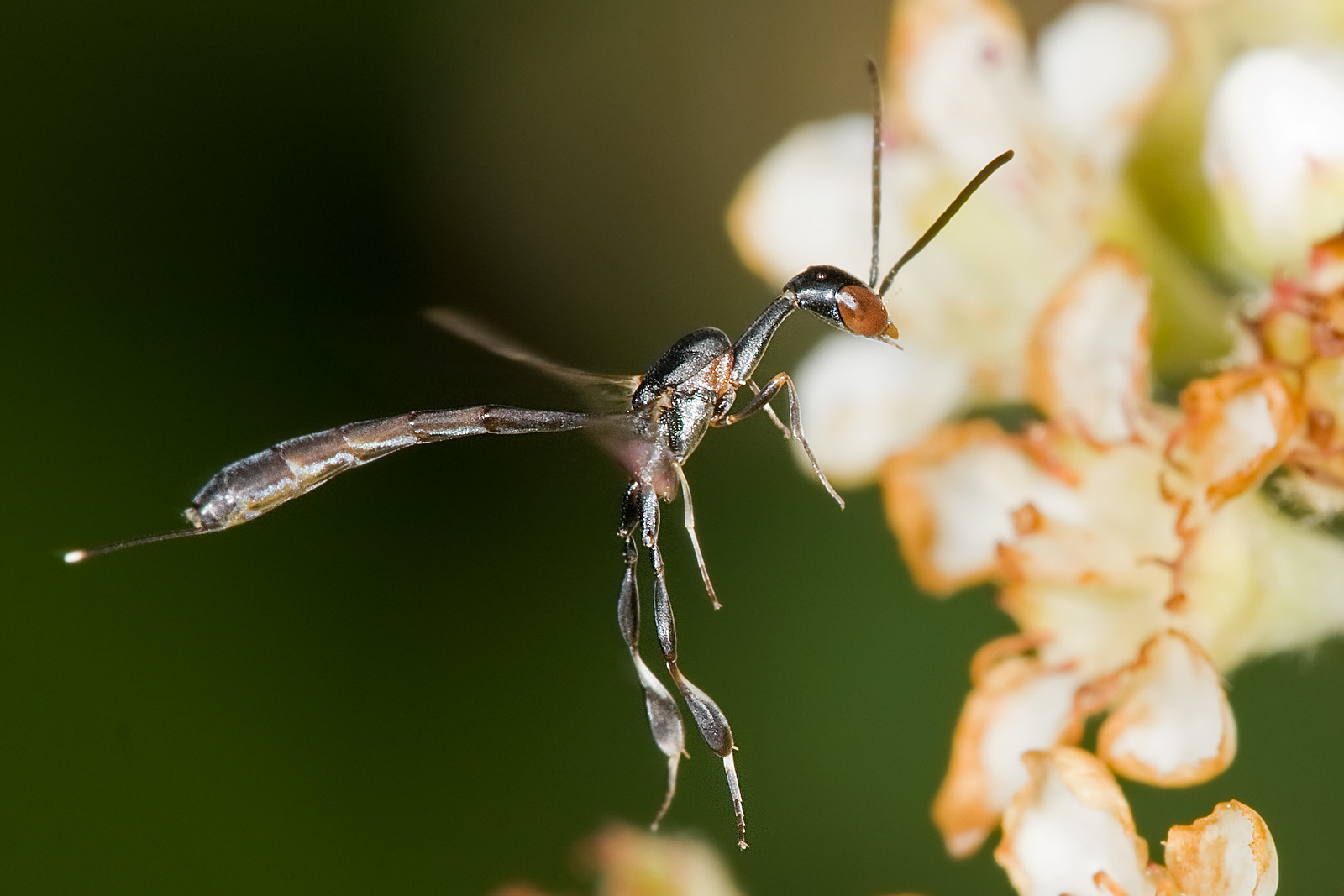
An Australian species in flight

The Gasteruptiidae are one of the more distinctive families among the apocritan wasps, with surprisingly little variation in appearance for a group that contains around 500 species in two subfamilies (Gasteruptiinae and Hyptiogastrinae) and with six genera worldwide. They are members of Evanioidea.

== Genera ==
This family includes the following genera in two subfamilies:

- Gasteruptiinae Ashmead, 1900
  - Gasteruption Latreille, 1777
  - Plutofoenus Kieffer, 1911
  - Spinolafoenus Macedo, 2009
  - Trilobitofoenus Macedo, 2009
- Hyptiogastrinae
  - Hyptiogaster Kieffer, 1903
  - Pseudofoenus Kieffer, 1902

Several fossil species are also known:

- †Hypselogastriinae
  - †Hypselogastrion Engel & Wang, 2016 Burmese amber, Myanmar, mid Cretaceous (latest Albian - earliest Cenomanian)
- †Kotujellitinae
  - †Kotujellites Rasnitsyn 1990 Taimyr amber, Russia Late Cretaceous (Cenomanian)
  - †Kotujisca Rasnitsyn 1991 Andaikhudag Formation, Mongolia, Early Cretaceous (Hauterivian-Barremian)

== Description ==
The propleura form an elongated "neck", the petiole is attached very high on the propodeum, and the hind tibiae are swollen and club-like. The females commonly have a long ovipositor (except in the genus Pseudofoenus), and lay eggs in the nests of solitary bees and wasps, where their larvae prey upon the host eggs, larvae and provisions.

The absence of "teeth" on the crown of the head and the somewhat thickened antennae readily separate these wasps from those in the unrelated family Stephanidae, which also contains very slender wasps with long necks.

== Distribution ==
The smaller of the two gasteruptiid subfamilies, Hyptiogastrinae, has a restricted Gondwanan distribution. Hyptiogaster with 10 species is endemic to Australia, whereas of the 80 species of Pseudofoenus, most are found in Australia, with 2 species in New Zealand, 2 species in South America, 5 species in New Guinea and New Britain, and 3 species in the south-west Pacific (New Caledonia, New Guinea, Fiji and Vanuatu).

Gasteruption is worldwide in its distribution, whereas Plutofoenus, Spinolafoenus and Trilobitofoenus are found in South America.
