= Mampuwordu Sands =

Mampuwordu Sand
- Stratigraphic range: Miocene
- Type: Geological formation
- Underlies: Tirari Formation

Lithology
- Primary: Sandstone

Location
- Country: South Australia, Australia

Type section
- Year defined: 1986

The Mampuwordu Sands are a geologic member or phase from the middle to late Miocene.
