= Lamarqueavis =

Lamarqueavis Temporal range: Late Cretaceous, 76.9–66 Ma

Scientific classification
- Kingdom: Animalia
- Phylum: Chordata
- Class: Reptilia
- Clade: Dinosauria
- Clade: Saurischia
- Clade: Theropoda
- Clade: Avialae
- Family: †Cimolopterygidae
- Genus: †Lamarqueavis; Agnolin, 2010

Type species
- †Lamarqueavis australis Agnolin, 2010

Other species
- †L. minima (Brodkorb, 1963); †L. petra (Hope, 2002)

Synonyms
- Cimolopteryx minima Brodkorb, 1963; Cimolopteryx petra Hope, 2002

Extinct genus of dinosaurs

Lamarqueavis is an extinct genus of ornithuran dinosaurs from the family Cimolopterygidae known from Late Cretaceous-aged rocks from Argentina, Canada, and the United States. The type species, L. australis, was named in 2010 and is based on the holotype MML 207, a partial right coracoid found in the Allen Formation, Argentina. Two other species, L. minima, based on the holotype UCMP 53976, a right coracoid found in the Lance Formation, Wyoming, and L. petra, based on the holotype AMNH 21911, a left coracoid also found in the Lance Formation, Wyoming, were transferred over from Cimolopteryx to Lamarqueavis in 2010. A third unnamed species is known from the Dinosaur Park Formation of Alberta, Canada.

Lamarqueavis autralis and Lamarqueavis sp. were placed in Cimolopterygidae based on the family's traits; a humeral articular facet that's ventrally oriented, a sternally extended procoracoid process that developed into a thin lamina, and a large ventrally positioned supracoracoid nerve foramen. Despite these family traits, they were found to be unique to Lamarqueavis, while not present in Cimolopteryx.
