= Andaikhudag Formation =

Early Cretaceous geologic formation in Mongolia

- Stratigraphic range: Hauterivian-Barremian; ~132–125 Ma
- Type: Geological formation

Lithology
- Primary: Shale
- Other: Sandstone

Location
- Coordinates: 46.0°N 99.6°E
- Approximate paleocoordinates: 47.2°N 100.3°E
- Region: Bayankhongor Province
- Country: Mongolia
- Andaikhudag Formation (Mongolia)

The Andaikhudag Formation, in older literature referred to as Unduruh Formation or Ondorukhaa Formation, is an Early Cretaceous (Hauterivian to Barremian) geologic formation in Mongolia. Dinosaur remains diagnostic to the genus level are among the fossils that have been recovered from the formation.

== Fossil content ==
The following fossils have been reported from the lacustrine shales and secondary sandstones of the formation:

Birds

- Ambiortus dementjevi - "Vertebrae and forelimb"
- Holbotia ponomarenkoi

Insects

- Hymenoptera
  - Kotujisca kholbotensis
  - Neoxyelula reducta
  - Palaeoichneumon townesi
- Diptera
  - Syntemna tele
  - Ulaia communis
- Coleoptera
  - Allophalerus bontsaganensis
  - Tetraphalerus notatus
- Plecoptera
  - Accretonemoura radiata

== See also ==
- List of dinosaur-bearing rock formations
  - List of stratigraphic units with few dinosaur genera
- Tsagaantsav Formation
