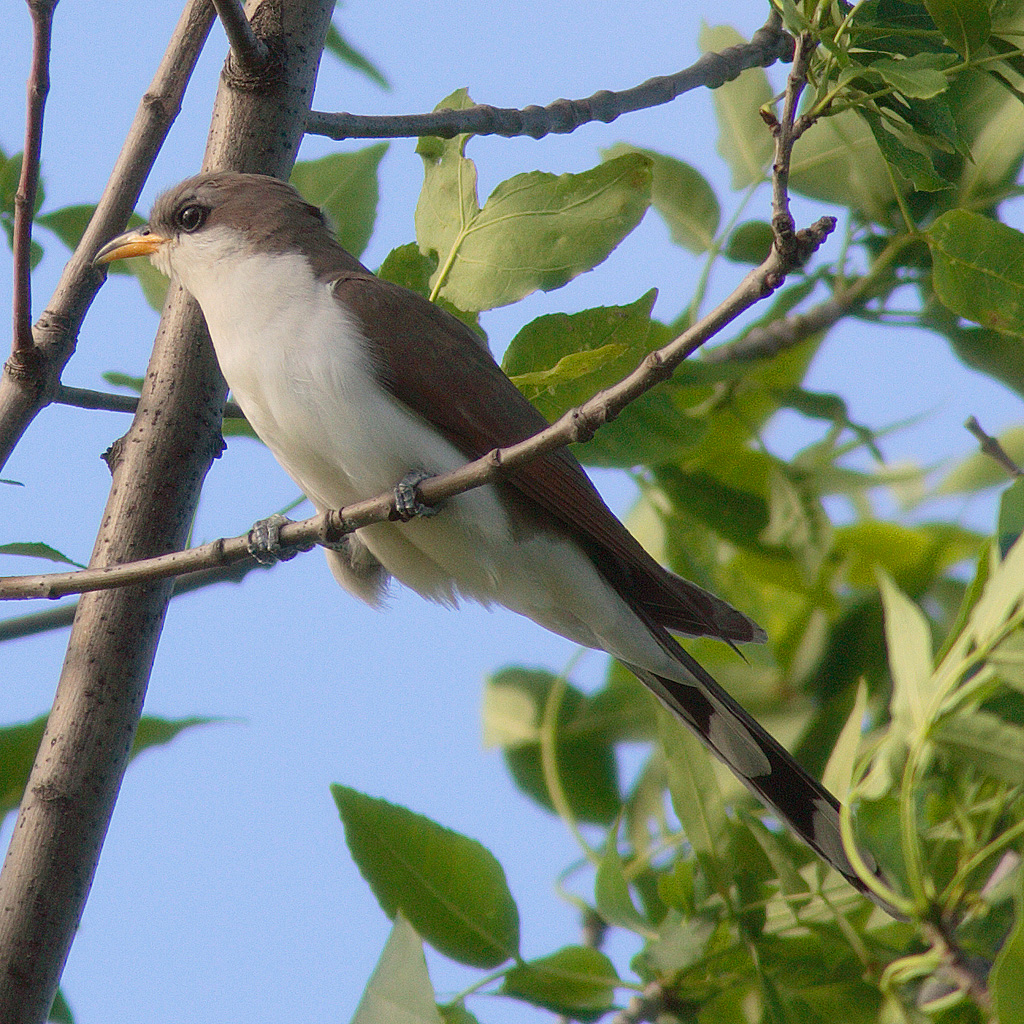
- Coccyzus americanus

Scientific classification
- Kingdom: Animalia
- Phylum: Chordata
- Class: Aves
- Order: Cuculiformes
- Genus: Coccyzidae

= Coccyzidae =

Family of birds

Coccyzidae was a family of birds comprising 18 New World cuckoos, ranging from Canada to Argentina. The family consists of the genera Coccyzus, Coccyua, and Piaya. This family is today typically subsumed within Cuculidae, e.g. by the International Ornithological Committee (IOC).

Of those whose habits are known, their main diet is insects. They tend to nest in trees and can lay up to 7 eggs (Coccyzus) although Saurothura only lays 2–3. Only one of the family, the Black-billed cuckoo Coccyzus erythropthalmus (Wilson), is known to be a brood parasite.

Both the yellow-billed cuckoo and the black-billed cuckoo are vagrants to Europe.
