= Palintropus =

Palintropus Temporal range: Late Cretaceous, 76.5–66 Ma

Scientific classification
- Kingdom: Animalia
- Phylum: Chordata
- Class: Reptilia
- Clade: Dinosauria
- Clade: Saurischia
- Clade: Theropoda
- Clade: Avialae
- Clade: †Ambiortiformes
- Genus: †Palintropus; Brodkorb, 1970
- Species: †P. retusus

Binomial name
- †Palintropus retusus (Marsh, 1892)

Synonyms
- Cimolopteryx retusa Marsh, 1892; Apatornis retusus (Marsh, 1892)

Extinct genus of dinosaurs

Palintropus is a prehistoric bird genus from the Late Cretaceous. A single species has been named (Palintropus retusus) based on a proximal coracoid from the Lance Formation of Wyoming, dated to the latest Maastrichtian, 66 million years ago. Coracoids and a proximal scapula of two unnamed species from the upper Campanian Dinosaur Park Formation of Alberta, dating to between 76.5 and 75 million years ago, are also known.

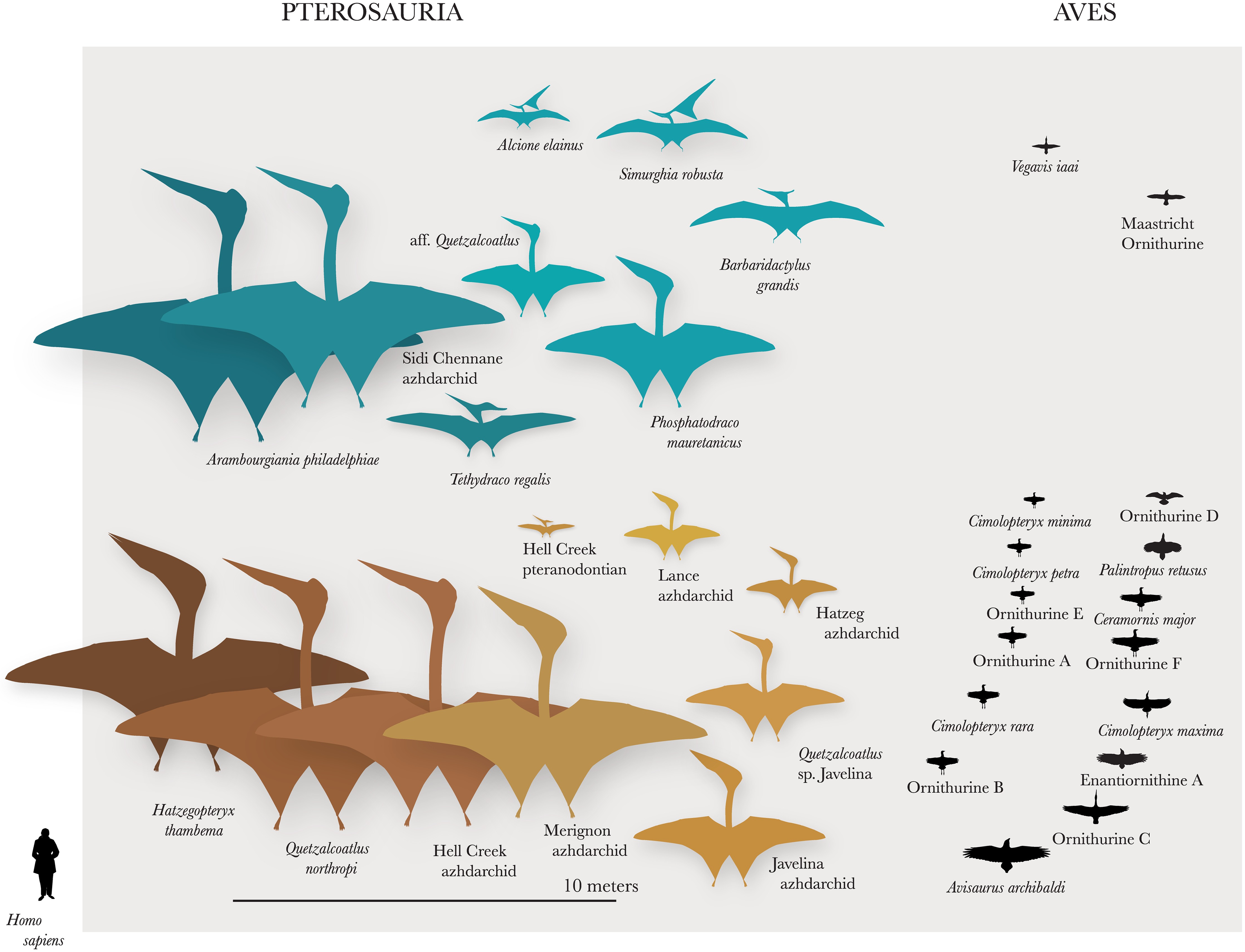
Size (lower middle right) compared to contemporary birds, pterosaurs, and a human

== Naming history ==
Initially it was placed in the wastebin genus "Cimolopteryx". Pierce Brodkorb assigned it its current name, first affiliating it with Apatornis in 1963, and establishing its current genus in 1970.

Its relationships are not well determined, mainly due to the paucity of material. Several major theories have been established: Like many of the birds of the subtropical coastlands of the Western Interior Seaway - maybe a bit like eastern Australia today - it is sometimes believed to be an early member of the Charadriiformes (waders, gulls, auks, etc.; see also "Graculavidae"). However, an alternate theory is that it is a galliform, perhaps a quercymegapodiid.

== Palintropiformes ==
In 2009, Longrich and colleagues proposed that Palintropus is a primitive bird related to Apsaravis. They conducted the first cladistic analysis of the remains, and found this to be the most likely hypothesis, suggesting Palintropus warrants inclusion in the newly established Palintropiformes.

== Basal quercymegapodiid ==
The quercymegapodiid hypothesis is supported by paleornithologist Sylvia Hope's (2002) paper on Mesozoic neornithines. This is based on the humeral facet of the coracoid having a large, free lateral flange, the reduced size of the procoracoid process, and a long, raised, ragged scar within the supracoracoid sulcus and parallel to the scapular facet. However, she also noted it differs from quercymegapodiids and more derived galliforms in retaining a supracoracoid foramen. Altogether, the most satisfying and quite robust hypothesis is that if P. retusus was not actually an early quercymegapodiid, it was just basal to that group.

The quercymegapodiids, an extinct group of prehistoric Galliformes, lived apparently on both sides of the Atlantic, which by then was narrower, with only a few straits separating Europe and North America in the temperate Greenland region. They seem to have been inhabitants of warm regions as they seem also have to occurred in Brazil, and it is quite likely that they were also found in or even originated in Africa from where almost no contemporary bird fossils are known. Their undisputed fossil record starts in the Eocene.

Given that Anseriformes are now known to have radiated into the families still present today, it is suspected that by the end of the Cretaceous, at least 4 lineages of Galliformes existed as distinct: Megapodiidae, Cracidae, Phasianidae and the Quercymegapodiidae. Consequently, the possibility that the present species was also a quercymegapodiid is well in agreement with the phylogenetic and biogeographic data.
