= Neococcyx =

Neococcyx Temporal range: Oligocene

Scientific classification
- Kingdom: Animalia
- Phylum: Chordata
- Class: Aves
- Order: Cuculiformes
- Family: Cuculidae
- Genus: †Neococcyx; Weigel, 1963
- Species: †N. mccorquodalei

Binomial name
- †Neococcyx mccorquodalei Weigel, 1963

Extinct genus of birds

Neococcyx mccorquodalei is a prehistoric bird, known from postcranial remains from the late Eocene (Chadronian) of Canada.
