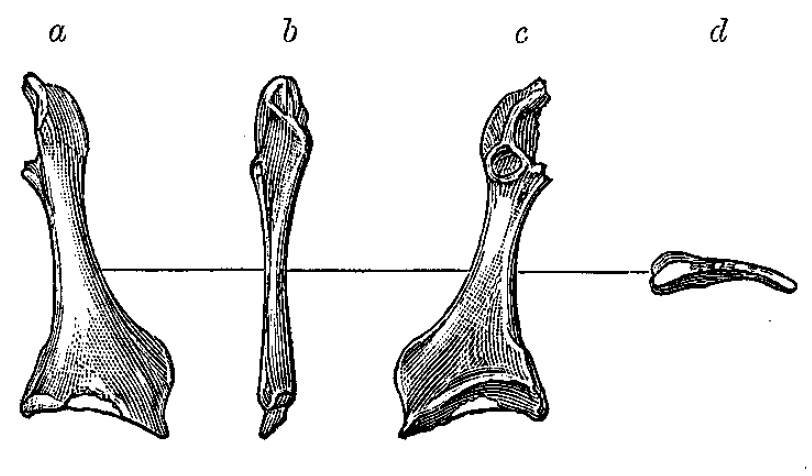
- Left coracoid of C. rara

Scientific classification
- Kingdom: Animalia
- Phylum: Chordata
- Class: Reptilia
- Clade: Dinosauria
- Clade: Saurischia
- Clade: Theropoda
- Clade: Avialae
- Family: †Cimolopterygidae
- Genus: †Cimolopteryx; Marsh, 1892

Type species
- †Cimolopteryx rara Marsh, 1892

Species
- †C. rara Marsh, 1892; †"C." maxima Brodkorb, 1963

= Cimolopteryx =

Cimolopteryx Temporal range: Late Cretaceous, 68–66 Ma

Extinct genus of dinosaurs

Cimolopteryx (meaning "Cretaceous wing") is a prehistoric bird genus from the Late Cretaceous Period. It is currently thought to contain only a single species, Cimolopteryx rara. The only specimen confidently attributed to C. rara was found in the Lance Formation of Wyoming, dating to the end of the Maastrichtian age, which ended about 66 million years ago. The dubious species "Cimolopteryx" maxima has been described from both the Lance Formation and the Hell Creek Formation of Montana. The humeral end of a left coracoid from the Frenchman Formation of southern Saskatchewan has also been attributed to the genus.

== Description and history ==
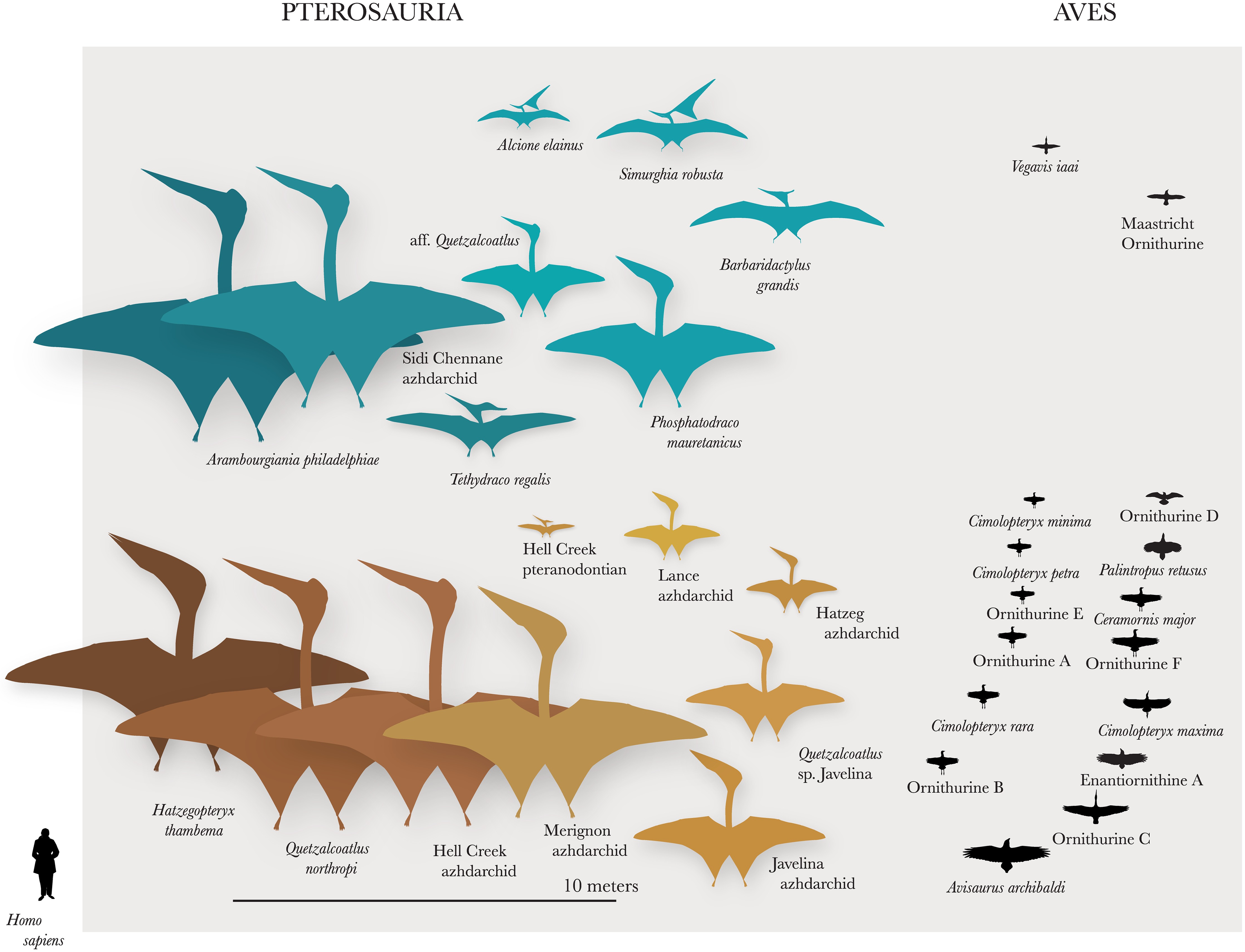
Size of Cimolopteryx species (lower right) compared to other Maastrichtian birds, pterosaurs, and a human

Cimolopteryx was a fairly small bird, with a maximum size about equal to that of a small gull. It is known almost exclusively from a number of coracoids (a bone in the shoulder girdle). These have a distinct enough anatomy, however, to allow it to be distinguished from other birds, and even for distinct species to be recognized. The first such coracoid to be found (specimen number YMP 1845, in the collections of the Peabody Museum of Natural History) was first mentioned and informally named by paleontologist Othniel Charles Marsh in the footnote of an 1889 paper, but it was not validly described by him until 1892. Marsh also described a second species in the same paper, which he named Cimolopteryx retusa, but this has since been recognized as a different kind of bird and reclassified as Palintropus retusus.

== Classification and species ==
The classification of various species assigned to the genus Cimolopteryx has changed over the years, and many species once thought to belong to this genus have been reclassified or deemed indeterminate. As of a re-evaluation of the fossil remains in 2002 by Sylvia Hope, at most five species were recognized: Cimolopteryx rara, C. petra, C. maxima, C. minima, and one yet-unnamed species. C. rara and C. petra were considered almost identical, and found in the same environments (the Lance and Frenchman formations), but differed in size, with C. petra smaller than C. rara. In a 2009 review, Nicholas Longrich synonymized them as the same species, dismissing the size difference as possibly based on sex or growth stage. However, Longrich reversed his position following a 2011 analysis of Lancian birds, in which he and co-authors considered all four named species to be distinct. C. minima and C. petra were transferred to the new genus Lamarqueavis by Federico Agnolin in 2010, based on their similarity to the South American species L. australis. An additional species from the much earlier Dinosaur Park Formation of Alberta has also since been re-evaluated as a probable species of Lamarqueavis rather than Cimolopteryx.

"Cimolopteryx" maxima was about twice the size of C. rara, but not enough of its anatomy is known to confidently determine if it belongs to Cimolopteryx or a different genus. In 2011, Longrich concluded that it was probably distinct, but did not name a new genus for it. Several collections of material that is similar to Cimolopteryx were referred to by Hope as undetermined species, which lack enough unique characteristics to be properly identified, and these may or may not belong to Cimolopteryx.

Hope regarded Cimolopteryx as a likely member of the modern bird group Charadriiformes, which includes a diverse array of shorebirds. However, since all species are known only from parts of the shoulder girdle and wing bone fragments, this classification is tentative, and a phylogenetic analysis failed to resolve the exact relationships of the many fragmentary Lancian-age bird species. Agnolin looked at anatomical similarities between the various species' coracoid bones, and concluded that Cimolopteryx and Lamarqueavis could be grouped together, along with Ceramornis, in a distinct family, the Cimolopterygidae.
