= Lonchodytes =

Lonchodytes Temporal range: Late Cretaceous, possibly Paleocene in age

Scientific classification
- Kingdom: Animalia
- Phylum: Chordata
- Class: Aves
- Clade: Aequornithes
- Genus: †Lonchodytes; Brodkorb 1963

Species
- Lonchodytes estesi Brodkorb 1963; "Lonchodytes" pterygius (see text)

Extinct genus of birds

Lonchodytes is a Late Cretaceous genus of aquatic bird, which lived along the shores of the Western Interior Seaway. It lived probably during the Maastrichtian, 70 million years ago (mya), and was found in Lance Creek Formation rocks in Wyoming (United States) though it seems still somewhat unclear if it did fossilize there or was reworked from later (Danian: Early Paleocene, less than 65 mya) deposits.

Lonchodytes estesi, the type species, appears to be closely related to the ancestor of some modern birds. It is most often allied - albeit tentatively - with the Gaviiformes (loons/divers), Procellariiformes (tubenoses) or Pelecaniformes. It was found to be closer to Procellariiformes than to the other orders by a cladistic analysis.

These are today generally believed to be closely related if not actually a clade, perhaps together with other "higher waterbirds" such as penguins. L. estesi might be basal to some lineages among these three, and/or other "higher waterbirds", a hypothesis by and large compatible with current phylogenetic analyses based on morphological and DNA sequence data, as well as the Mesozoic record of Neornithes.

"Lonchodytes" pterygius on the other hand quite likely does not belong into this genus. It appears very distinct from in a cladistic phylogeny and seems to be a member of the Charadriiformes. Given the paucity of remains however, it cannot be excluded with certainty that it represents an ancestral "higher waterbird" lineage that was morphologically convergent to waders.
