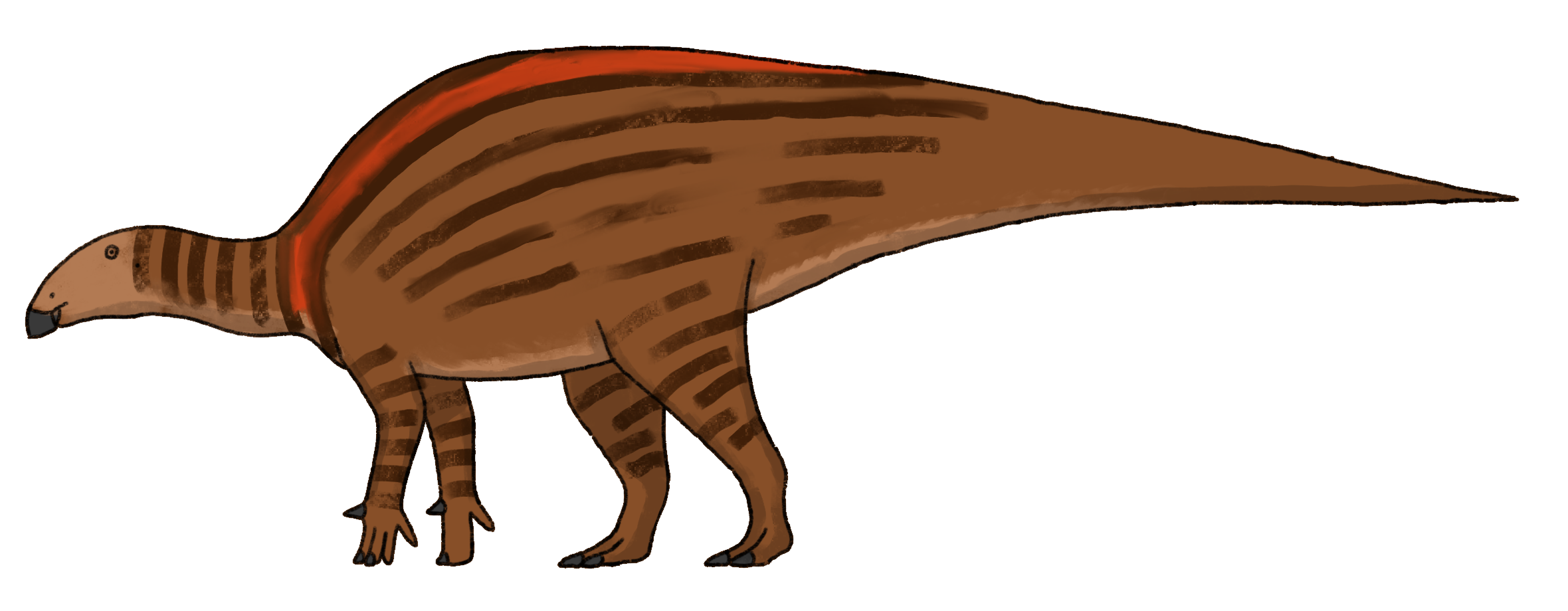
- Hypothetical life reconstruction

Scientific classification
- Kingdom: Animalia
- Phylum: Chordata
- Class: Reptilia
- Clade: Dinosauria
- Clade: †Ornithischia
- Clade: †Ornithopoda
- Superfamily: †Hadrosauroidea
- Genus: †Arstanosaurus; Shilin & Suslov, 1982
- Species: †A. akkurganensis

Binomial name
- †Arstanosaurus akkurganensis Shilin & Suslov, 1982

= Arstanosaurus =

Arstanosaurus Temporal range: Late Cretaceous, 85–84 Ma

Extinct genus of dinosaurs

Arstanosaurus (meaning "Arstan lizard" after the Arstan well) is a genus of hadrosauroid dinosaur from the Late Cretaceous-aged (Santonian-Campanian) Bostobe Formation of Kazakhstan. It has had a confusing history, being considered a hadrosaurid, a ceratopsid, or both at the same time (chimeric).

== History ==
The genus was based on a partial left maxilla (holotype AAIZ 1/1 or IZ AN KSSR 1/1), with the lower end of a left femur (AAIZ 1/2) possibly referable. Both were found at Akkurgan-Boltyk near Qyzylorda and were named and described as Arstanosaurus akkurganensis in 1982. This is not much material for naming a new genus, and it was largely ignored until the mid-1990s, when the hypothesis that it was really a ceratopsid appeared. Shortly thereafter, a new revision appeared that showed that the characteristics listed as unusual for Arstanosaurus were really based on perspective, and that the maxilla was from an animal like Bactrosaurus, albeit indeterminate (a dubious name). The femur was uninformative. It was regarded as an indeterminate hadrosaurid in the most recent review.

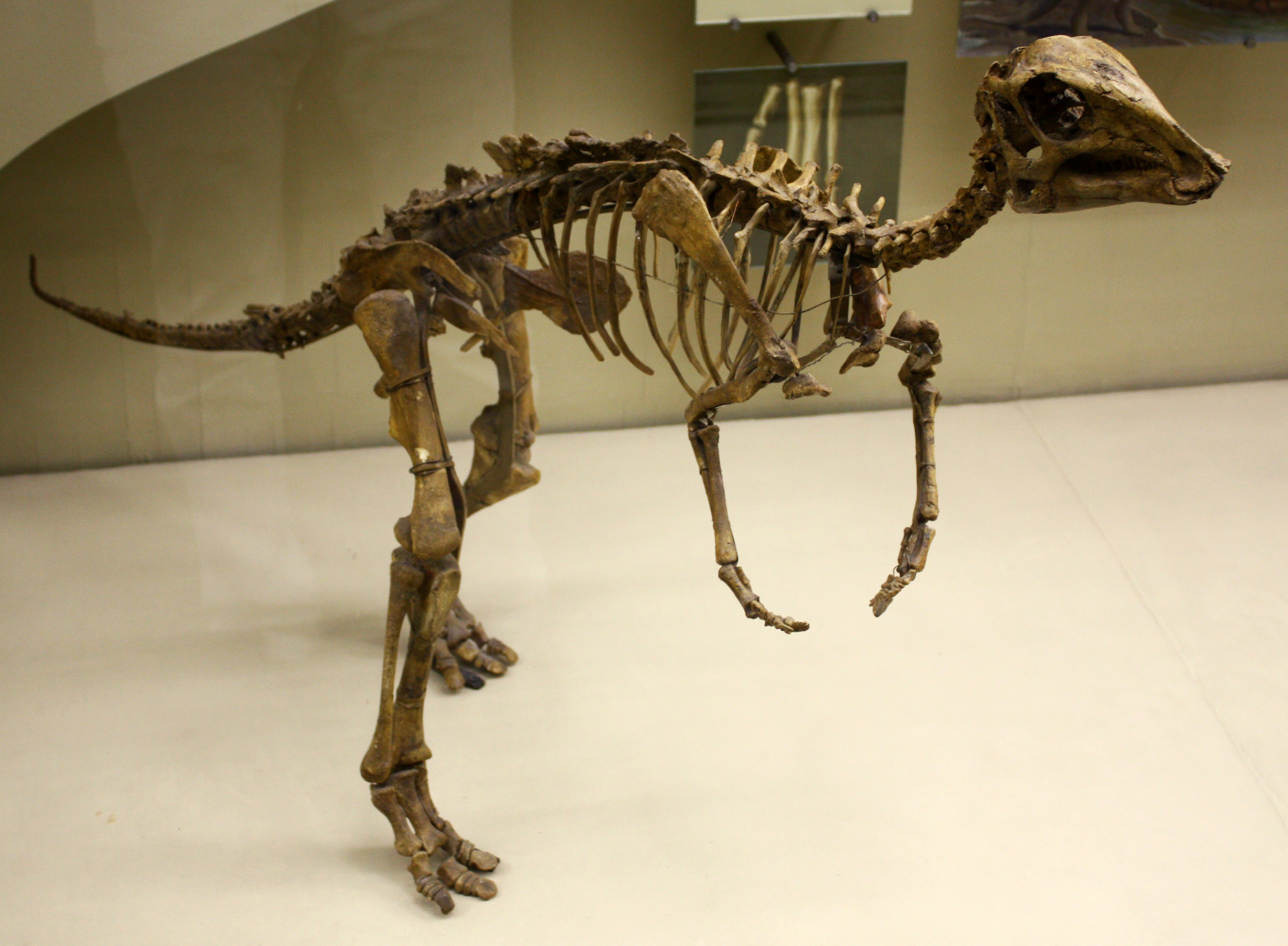
Juvenile skeleton that has at times been assigned to Arstanosaurus

Diagnostic hadrosauroid remains from the same area have in 2012 been named as Batyrosaurus.

A hadrosauroid from the Bayan Shireh Formation (informally called "Gadolosaurus") has at times been identified as Arstanosaurus, but is clearly a distinct genus.

== Paleobiology ==
As a hadrosaurid, Arstanosaurus would have been a bipedal/quadrupedal herbivore, eating plants with sets of ever-replacing teeth stacked on each other.

== See also ==
- Timeline of hadrosaur research
