= Minggangia =

Minggangia Temporal range: Eocene

Scientific classification
- Kingdom: Animalia
- Phylum: Chordata
- Class: Aves
- Order: incertae sedis
- Genus: †Minggangia; Hou, 1982
- Species: †M. changgouensis

Binomial name
- †Minggangia changgouensis Hou, 1982

Extinct genus of birds

Minggangia is an extinct genus of bird containing one species, Minggangia changgouensis. Fossils were discovered in the Lizhuang Formation of Henan Province, China. This formation was dated back at the late Eocene period.

== Classification ==
The genus and species were first described in 1982. The original describer considered that Minggangia changgouensis was an ibis, comparing it to Ibidopsis hordwelliensis, and placing it in the family Threskiornithidae. Ibidopsis has also been placed in the rails (family Rallidae), a placement supported for Minggangia in 2005 based on bone anatomy.
