= Ambiortiformes =

Ambiortiforms Temporal range: Early Cretaceous-Late Cretaceous, 136–66 Ma

Scientific classification
- Kingdom: Animalia
- Phylum: Chordata
- Class: Reptilia
- Clade: Dinosauria
- Clade: Saurischia
- Clade: Theropoda
- Clade: Avialae
- Clade: Euornithes
- Clade: †Ambiortiformes; Kurochkin, 1982

Genera
- †Ambiortus; †Apsaravis; †Palintropus?

Synonyms
- Apsaraviformes Feduccia, 2014; Palintropiformes? Longrich, Tokaryk and Field, 2011

Extinct clade of dinosaurs

Ambiortiformes is a group of prehistoric ornithuromorph dinosaurs.

== Cladistic analyses ==
The first species to be included, Ambiortus dementjevi, lived sometime during the Barremian age between 136.4 and 125 million years ago in today's Mongolia. A. dementjevi belongs to the Ornithuromorpha (the group containing modern birds but not enantiornithes), according to all published cladistic analyses. However, the exact position of the species within this group has been controversial. Most analyses have found it to be either an unresolved member of the Ornithurae, or a more primitive member of Ornithuromorpha. One 2006 study, for example, found it to be more primitive than Yanornis but more advanced than Hongshanornis, or even a member of the specific group containing both Yanornis and Yixianornis.

== Inclusions ==
The group includes at least Ambiortus and possibly the supposed close relative Apsaravis. The results of a cladistic analysis published in 2011 indicate that Apsaravis and Palintropus are very closely related.
