= Lance Formation =

Geological formation in the United States

- Stratigraphic range: Maastrichtian; ~70–65.5 Ma
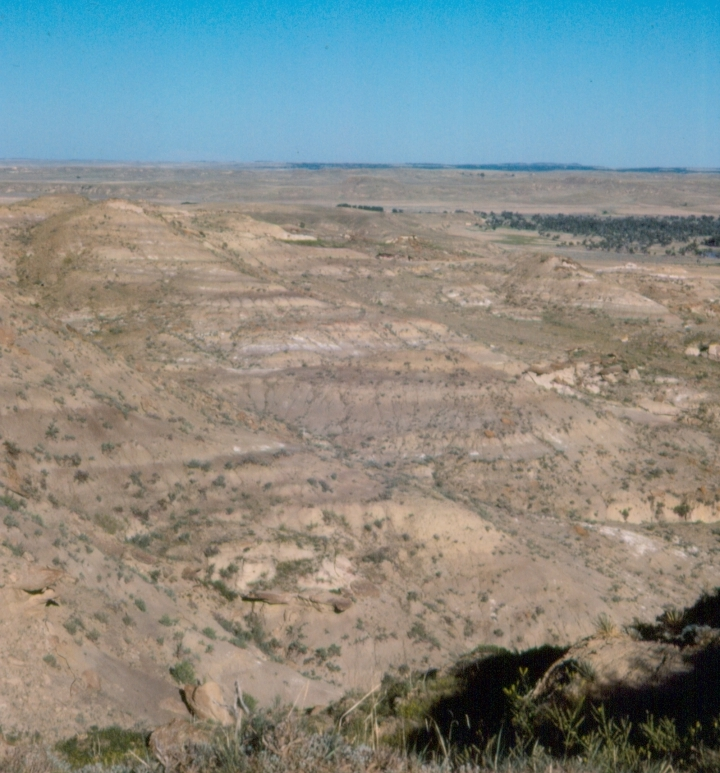
- Badlands in the Lance Formation along Cow Creek near the type locality, Niobrara County, Wyoming
- Type: Sedimentary
- Underlies: Fort Union Formation
- Overlies: Meeteetse Formation
- Thickness: up to 600 metres (1,970 ft)

Lithology
- Primary: Sandstone, siltstone, shale

Location
- Region: Wyoming
- Country: United States

Type section
- Named for: Lance Creek, Wyoming
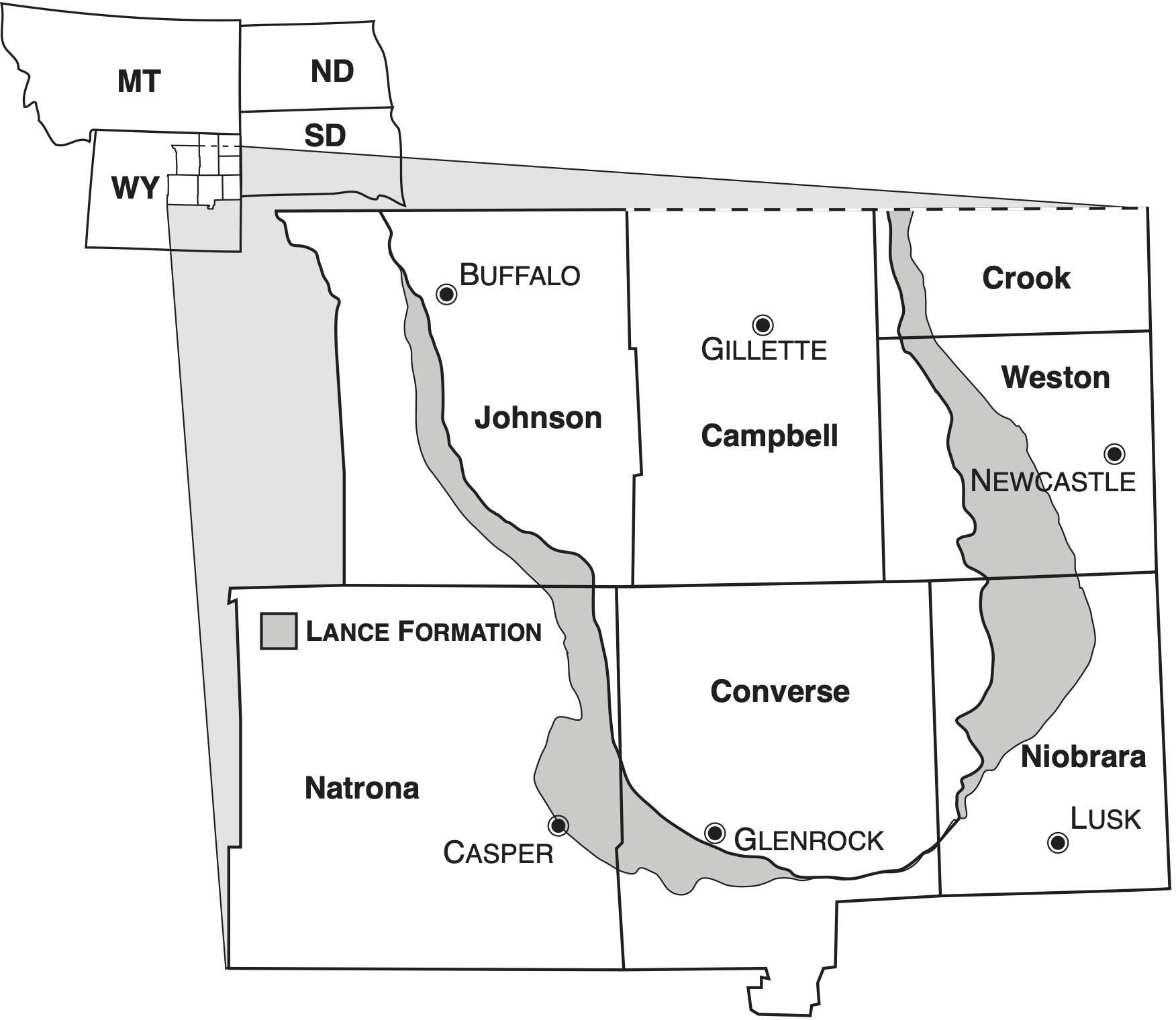
- Outcrops of the Lance Formation in Wyoming

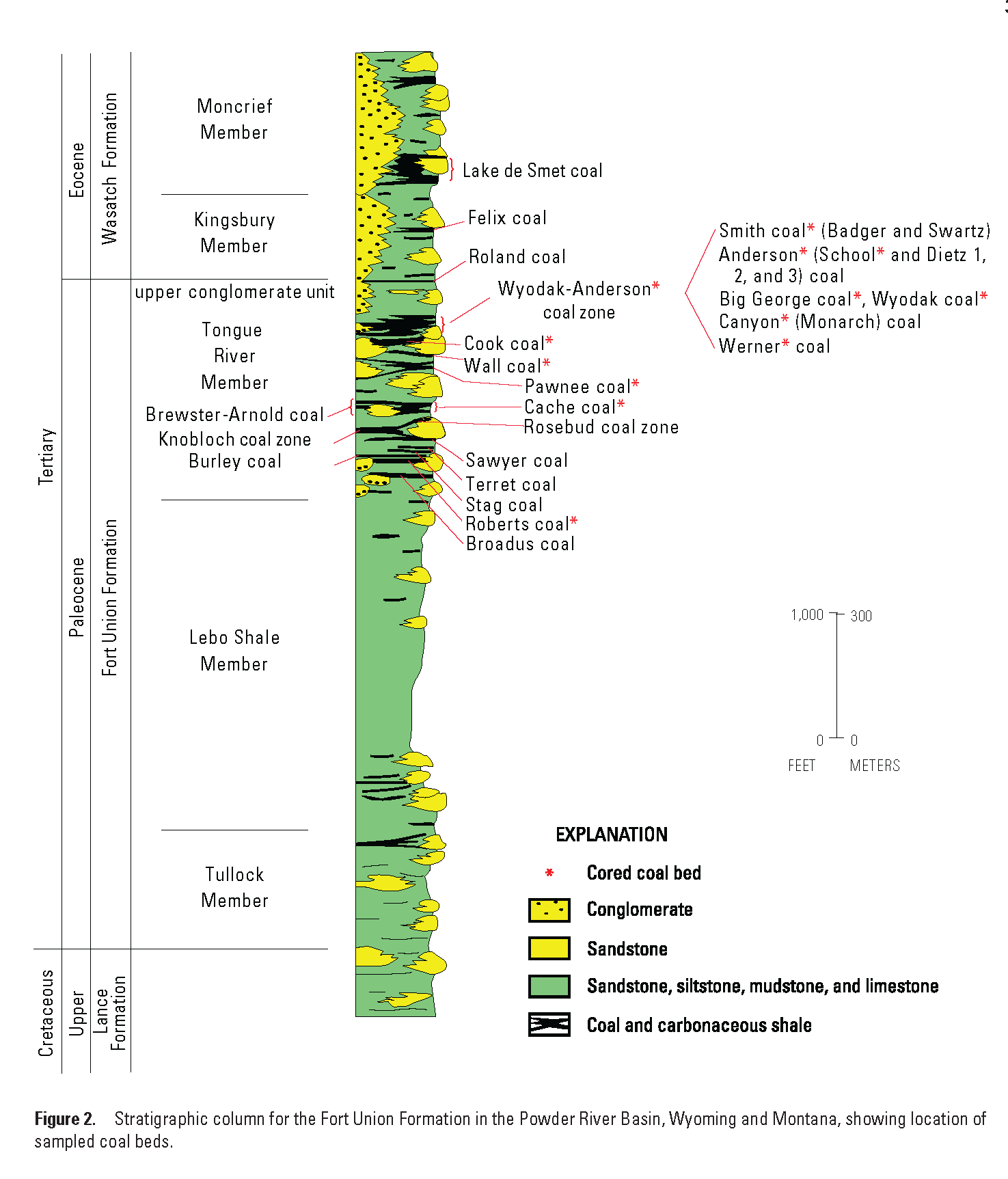
Lance Formation – stratigraphy

The Lance (Creek) Formation is a division of Late Cretaceous (dating to about 69–65.5 Ma) rocks in the western United States. Named after Lance Creek, Wyoming, the microvertebrate fossils and dinosaurs represent important components of the latest Mesozoic vertebrate faunas. The Lance Formation is Late Maastrichtian in age (Lancian land mammal age), and shares much fauna with the Hell Creek Formation of Montana and South Dakota and, the Frenchman Formation of southwest Saskatchewan, and the lower part of the Scollard Formation of Alberta.

The Lance Formation occurs above the Baculites clinolobatus ammonite marine zone in Wyoming, the top of which has been dated to about 69 million years ago, and extends to the K-Pg boundary, 65.5 million years ago. However, the characteristic land vertebrate fauna of the Lancian age (which take its name from this formation) is only found in the upper strata of the Lance, roughly corresponding to the thinner equivalent formations such as the Hell Creek Formation, the base of which has been estimated at 167 years old.

== Description ==
The formation is described by W.G. Pierce as thick-bedded, buff-colored sandstone, and drab to green shale. It is Upper Cretaceous in age.

The formation varies in thickness from about 90 m (300 ft.) in North Dakota, to almost 600 m (2,000 ft.) in parts of Wyoming.

=== Depositional environment ===
The Lance Formation was laid down by streams, on a coastal plain along the edge of the Western Interior Seaway. The climate was subtropical; there was no cold season and probably ample precipitation.

== Paleontology ==
At least tens of thousands of Late Cretaceous vertebrate remains have been recovered from the Lance Formation. Fossils ranging from microscopic elements to extensive bonebeds, with nearly complete, sometimes articulated dinosaur skeletons, have been found. Most other animals known from the formation are freshwater animals, and some are exclusively freshwater forms (for instance, frogs and salamanders). However, marine fossils are also found in the formation, suggesting that the sea was nearby. The bird fauna is mainly composed of orders still existing today.

=== Theropods ===
Color key: Taxon / Reclassified taxon / Taxon falsely reported as present / Dubious taxon or junior synonym / Ichnotaxon / Ootaxon / Morphotaxon

Notes
Uncertain or tentative taxa are in small text
~~crossed out~~ taxa are discredited.

==== Avialans ====
Birds reported from the Lance Formation
Genus	Species	Location	Stratigraphic Position	Material	Notes	Images
Apatornis	A. retusus				Reclassified as Palintropus retusus	
Ceramornis	C. major			UCMP 53959 (holotype), a partial coracoid	A possible charadriiform bird	
Cimolopteryx	C. petra				Reclassified as Lamarqueavis minima	
Cimolopteryx	C. rara			YPM 1805 (holotype), a partial coracoid	A charadriiform	
Cimolopteryx	C. retusa				Reclassified as Palintropus retusus	
Cimolopteryx	C. minima				Reclassified as Lamarqueavis minima	
"Cimolopteryx"	"C." maxima			UCMP 53973 (holotype), a partial coracoid	A charadriiform bird, not necessarily closely related to Cimolopteryx.	
Graculavus	G. augustus			AMNH 25223, a partial humerus	A possible charadriiform	
Lamarqueavis	L. minima			UCMP 53976 (holotype), a partial coracoid	A charadriiform	
Lamarqueavis	L. petra			AMNH 21911 (holotype), a partial coracoid	A charadriiform	
Lonchodytes	L. estesi			UCMP 53954 (holotype), a partial tarsometatarsus	A possible procellariiform	
"Lonchodytes"	"L." pterygius			UCMP 53961 (holotype), a partial carpometacarpus	A possible charadriiform	
"Palaeotringa"	"P." vetus			ANSP 13361 (holotype), a partial tibiotarsus; AMNH 25221, a partial tibiotarsus	A bird similar to gruids, idiornithids and presbyornithids.	
Palintropus	P. retusus			YPM 513 (holotype), a partial coracoid	A basal ornithuromorph belonging to Ambiortiformes.	
Potamornis	P. skutchi			UCMP 73103 (holotype), a quadrate; tarsometatarsus?	A hesperornithiform possibly also present in the Hell Creek Formation.	
Torotix	T. clemensi			UCMP 53958, a partial humerus	A possible pelecaniform	
Unnamed presbyornithid	Indeterminate			AMNH 21929, a partial scapula; AMNH 22603, a partial scapula; YPM 868, a partial scapula; AMNH 22602, a partial sternum	A presbyornithid	
Unnamed enantiornithean	Unnamed			USNM 2909, a partial metatarsal and pedal phalanges	An enantiornithean, previously referred to "Ornithomimus" minutus	
Unnamed avian	Indeterminate			UCMP 53960, two partial neck vertebrae	An indeterminate avian	
Unnamed phalacrocoracid	Indeterminate			AMNH 25272, a femur	A possible phalacrocoracid	
Unnamed galloanserine	Indeterminate			UCMP 53969, a quadrate; YPM VP 59473, a partial skeleton consisting of skull, vertebrae and limb material	A possible galloanserine	
"Unnamed ornithurine A"	Indeterminate			UCMP 53962, a partial coracoid; UCMP 53963, a partial coracoid; AMNH uncatalogued, a partial coracoid	Originally thought to belong to Cimolopteryx rara, but probably a new species. Also present in the Frenchman Formation.	
"Unnamed ornithurine C"	Indeterminate			YPM PU 17020, a partial coracoid	Also present in the Hell Creek Formation.	
"Unnamed ornithurine E"	Indeterminate			USNM 181923, a partial coracoid; USNM 13011, a partial coracoid	Also present in the Hell Creek Formation.	
"Unnamed ornithurine F"	Indeterminate			UCMP 53957, a partial coracoid; ACM 12359, a partial coracoid	Originally thought to belong to "Cimolopteryx" maxima, but probably a new species.	
"Asteriornis-like bird"	Indeterminate			UCMP 143274, a fragmentary mandible	Previously identified as a parrot, then Caenagnathidae, but lacks the distinctive mandibular grooves, which appear early in development and present even in the smallest members of the latter. Larger than Asteriornis itself.	

==== Non-avialan theropods ====
An isolated tooth crown of an indeterminate coelurosaur is recovered from the formation.

Non-avaialan theropods of the Lance Formation
Genus	Species	Location	Stratigraphic Position	Material	Notes	Images
Anzu	A. wyliei			Partial forelimb, hindlimb, phalanges and caudal vertebrae	An oviraptorosaur originally identified from the Hell Creek Formation.	Anzu
Aublysodon	A. amplus			Teeth, type specimen	Dubious tyrannosaurids probably synonymous with Tyrannosaurus rex	
Aublysodon	A. cristatus			Teeth, type specimen	Dubious tyrannosaurids probably synonymous with Tyrannosaurus rex	
"Ornithomimus"	"O." sedens			"Sacrum and fragmentary illium" type specimen	An ornithomimid.	Ornithomimus
Paronychodon	P. caperatus			Teeth, type specimen	A troodontid	
Pectinodon	P. bakkeri			Teeth, type specimen	A troodontid	Pectinodon bakkeri tooth
Tyrannosaurus	T. rex			Several partial specimens and teeth	A tyrannosaurid originally identified from the Hell Creek Formation. Also found in the Denver, Ferris, Frenchman, Javelina, Livingston, McRae, North Horn, Scollard, and Willow Creek Formations. Synonyms with type specimens from this formation include Dynamosaurus imperiosus and Manospondylus gigas.	Tyrannosaurus
Trierarchuncus	cf. T. prairiensis			YPM VP 56916, complete manual ungual I; YPM VP 57236, complete pedal ungual; YPM VP 57402, partial pedal ungual	An alvarezsaurid originally identified from the Hell Creek Formation.	
Troodontinae	Indeterminate			YPM VP 004691	Not referrable to Paronychodon or Pectinodon.	
cf. Microraptoria	Indeterminate			YPM VP 865, distal half of metatarsal III; YPM VP 57403, ?left pedal ungual II-3; YPM VP 57404, ?left pedal phalanx II-1; YPM VP 57237, distal caudal vertebra	Potentially the youngest microraptorian specimens, but YPM VP 865 may belong to the Unenlagiinae or Halszkaraptorinae.	
Eudromaeosauria	Indeterminate			YPM VPPU 20589		
Nanotyrannidae	Indeterminate			YPM 55587		

=== Ornithischia ===
==== Ankylosaurs ====
Ankylosaurs of the Lance Formation
Genus	Species	Location	Stratigraphic Position	Material	Notes	Images
Ankylosaurus	A. magniventris	Wyoming		More than 70 osteoderms and a tooth	An ankylosaurid, originally identified from the Hell Creek Formation.	Ankylosaurus Denversaurus Edmontonia
Denversaurus	D. schlessmani	Wyoming		FPDM-V9673, formerly BHI 127327	A nodosaurid, originally identified from the Hell Creek Formation.	Ankylosaurus Denversaurus Edmontonia
Edmontonia	E. sp.	Wyoming		Teeth	A nodosaurid. Fossils have been unearthed in the Hell Creek Formation, the Ferris Formation, the Dinosaur Park Formation, the Horseshoe Canyon Formation, and the Denver Formation.	Ankylosaurus Denversaurus Edmontonia
"Palaeoscincus"	"P. latus"	Wyoming		Teeth	Probably a nodosaurid, but the teeth could also belong to the Pachycephalosauridae.	Ankylosaurus Denversaurus Edmontonia

==== Marginocephalians ====
Marginocephalians reported from the Lance Formation
Genus	Species	Location	Stratigraphic Position	Material	Notes	Images
Agathaumas	A. sylvestris			"Partial sacrum and pelvis," type specimen.	A dubious ceratopsid probably synonymous with Triceratops horridus	Leptoceratops gracilis Nedoceratops hatcheri Pachycephalosaurus wyomingensis Stygimoloch spinifer Torosaurus latus Triceratops horridus
Leptoceratops	L. gracilis				A ceratopsian	Leptoceratops gracilis Nedoceratops hatcheri Pachycephalosaurus wyomingensis Stygimoloch spinifer Torosaurus latus Triceratops horridus
Nedoceratops	N. hatcheri			"[One] skull," type specimen.	A ceratopsid possibly synonymous with Triceratops horridus. Synonyms include Diceratops hatcheri and Diceratus hatcheri.	Leptoceratops gracilis Nedoceratops hatcheri Pachycephalosaurus wyomingensis Stygimoloch spinifer Torosaurus latus Triceratops horridus
Pachycephalosaurus	P. wyomingensis			Fragmentary specimens including the type specimen.	A pachycephalosaur. Synonyms with type specimens from this formation include Troodon wyomingensis.	Leptoceratops gracilis Nedoceratops hatcheri Pachycephalosaurus wyomingensis Stygimoloch spinifer Torosaurus latus Triceratops horridus
"Palaeoscincus"	"P." latus			"Tooth."	A dubious pachycephalosaur, previously classified as the ankylosaur Palaeoscincus	Leptoceratops gracilis Nedoceratops hatcheri Pachycephalosaurus wyomingensis Stygimoloch spinifer Torosaurus latus Triceratops horridus
Stygimoloch	S. spinifer				A pachycephalosaur possibly synonymous with Pachycephalosaurus wyomingensis	Leptoceratops gracilis Nedoceratops hatcheri Pachycephalosaurus wyomingensis Stygimoloch spinifer Torosaurus latus Triceratops horridus
Torosaurus	T. latus			Several specimens including the type specimen.	A ceratopsid possibly synonymous with Triceratops horridus. Torosaurus gladius, with type specimen from this formation, is a synonym. Also present in the Frenchman and Hell Creek Formations.	Leptoceratops gracilis Nedoceratops hatcheri Pachycephalosaurus wyomingensis Stygimoloch spinifer Torosaurus latus Triceratops horridus
Triceratops	T. horridus			"Partial skull and skeleton," type specimen	A ceratopsid, also found in the Evanston, Frenchman, Hell Creek, Laramie, and Scollard Formations. Synonyms with type specimens from this formation include T. ingens and T. sulcatus.	Leptoceratops gracilis Nedoceratops hatcheri Pachycephalosaurus wyomingensis Stygimoloch spinifer Torosaurus latus Triceratops horridus

==== Ornithopods ====
Indeterminate lambeosaurinae fossils have been found in the Lance Formation.

Ornithopods of the Lance Formation
Genus	Species	Location	Stratigraphic Position	Abundance	Notes	Images
Edmontosaurus	E. annectens			Skull, skeletons, including the type specimen, "mummy", and a bone bed.	A hadrosaurid. Synonyms from this formation include Anatosaurus annectens and Claosaurus annectens. Also found in the Frenchman, Hell Creek, Laramie and Scollard Formations.	Edmontosaurus annectens Thescelosaurus neglectus
Thescelosaurus	T. neglectus			Well-preserved skeleton, type specimen	A thescelosaurid. Also found in the Frenchman, Hell Creek, Laramie and Scollard Formations.	Edmontosaurus annectens Thescelosaurus neglectus
Thespesius	T. occidentalis			Teeth, vertebrae, toe bone (including type specimen)	A dubious hadrosaurid possibly synonymous with E. annectens	Edmontosaurus annectens Thescelosaurus neglectus
"Trachodon"	"T." longiceps			One partial jaw (YPM 616), type specimen	A dubious hadrosaurid possibly synonymous with E. annectens	Edmontosaurus annectens Thescelosaurus neglectus

=== Other vertebrates ===
Other land vertebrates include pterosaurs (e.g. cf. Quetzalcoatlus), crocodiles, champsosaurs, lizards, snakes, turtles, frogs and salamanders.

Remains of fishes and mammals (i.e. Nanocuris) have also been found in the Lance Formation.

== See also ==
- List of fossil sites (with link directory)
- List of dinosaur-bearing rock formations
