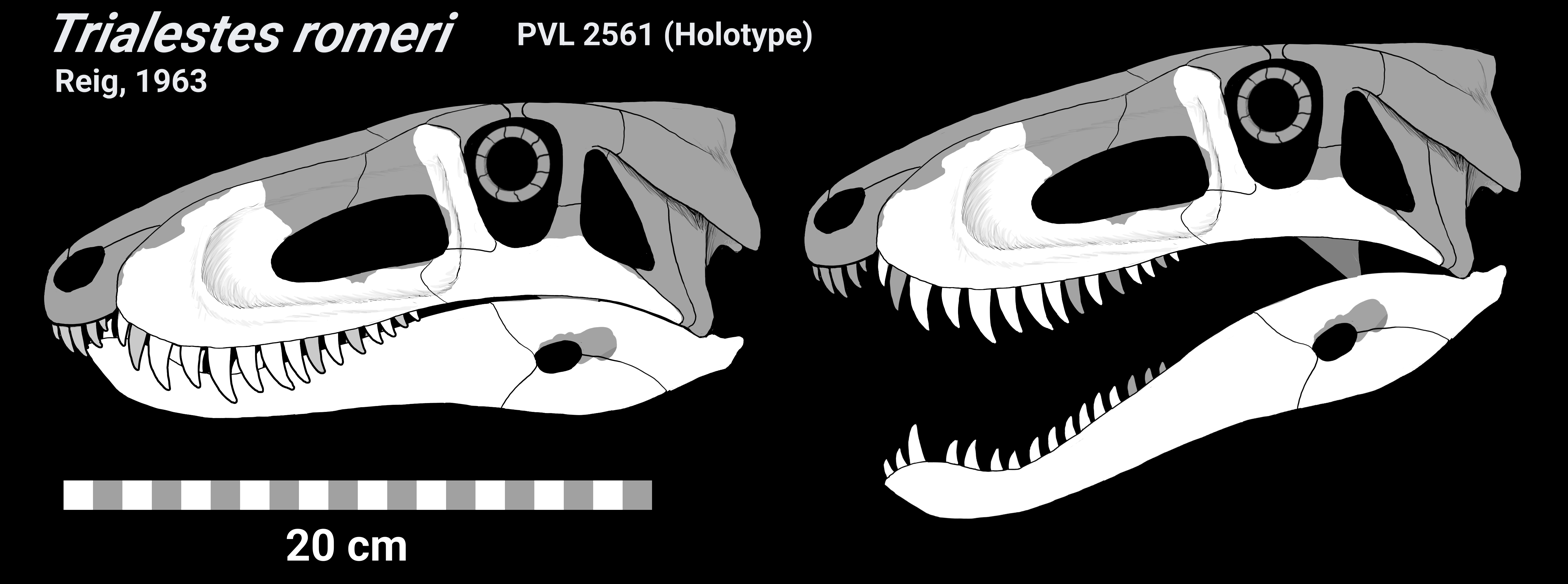
- Skull illustration
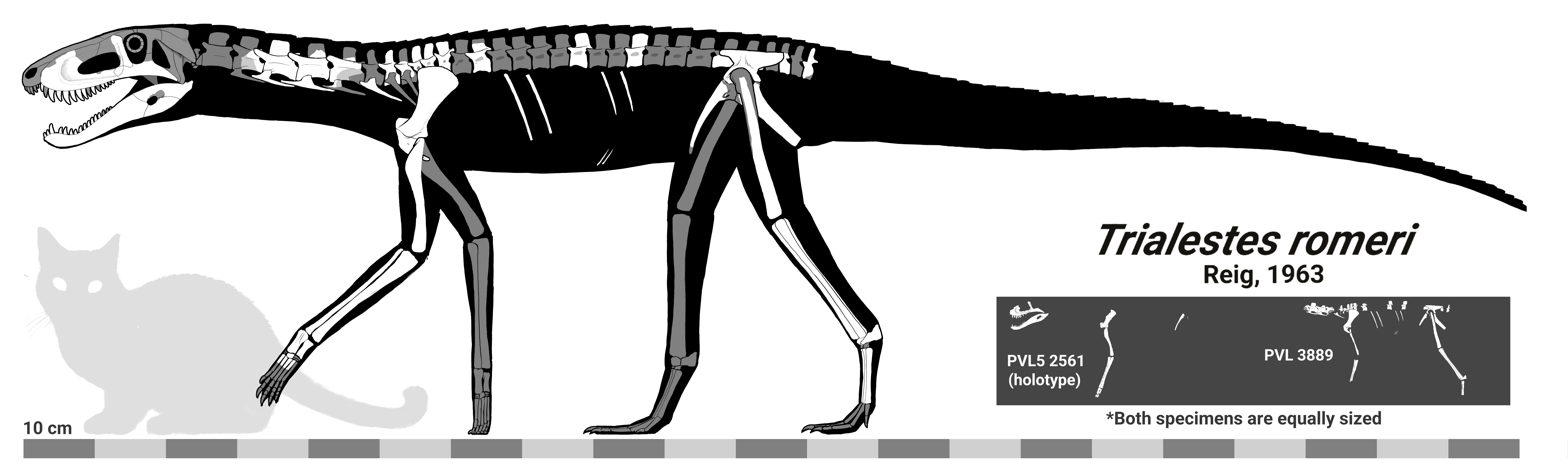
- Skeletal diagram showcasing what is preserved of both specimens, known bones in white

Scientific classification
- Kingdom: Animalia
- Phylum: Chordata
- Class: Reptilia
- Clade: Pseudosuchia
- Clade: Crocodylomorpha
- Genus: †Trialestes; Bonaparte, 1982
- Species: †T. romeri

Binomial name
- †Trialestes romeri Reig, 1963

Synonyms
- Triassolestes Reig, 1963

= Trialestes =

Trialestes Temporal range: Carnian ~235.0–221.5 Ma

Extinct genus of reptiles

Trialestes is an extinct genus of Late Triassic (Carnian) crocodylomorphs that lived in South America. It has been classified as a dinosaur in the past due it being adapted as a terrestrial, running carnivore. It is classified in Sphenosuchia, which were early relatives of crocodylians. Irmis, Nesbitt and Sues (2013) noted that some of the material referred to this taxon is actually dinosaurian; however, according to the authors, the holotype specimen PVL 2561, found in the Cancha de Bochas Member of the Ischigualasto Formation in the Ischigualasto-Villa Unión Basin in northwestern Argentina, "comprises a single individual that preserves unambiguous crocodylomorph synapomorphies", indicating it is indeed a crocodylomorph, and one of the referred specimens, PVL 3889, does share one or more autapomorphies with the holotype, indicating it represents the same taxon. The type species, T. romeri, was named in 1963.
