= St. Mary River Formation =

Geologic formation in western Canada

- Stratigraphic range: 71.9–67 Ma
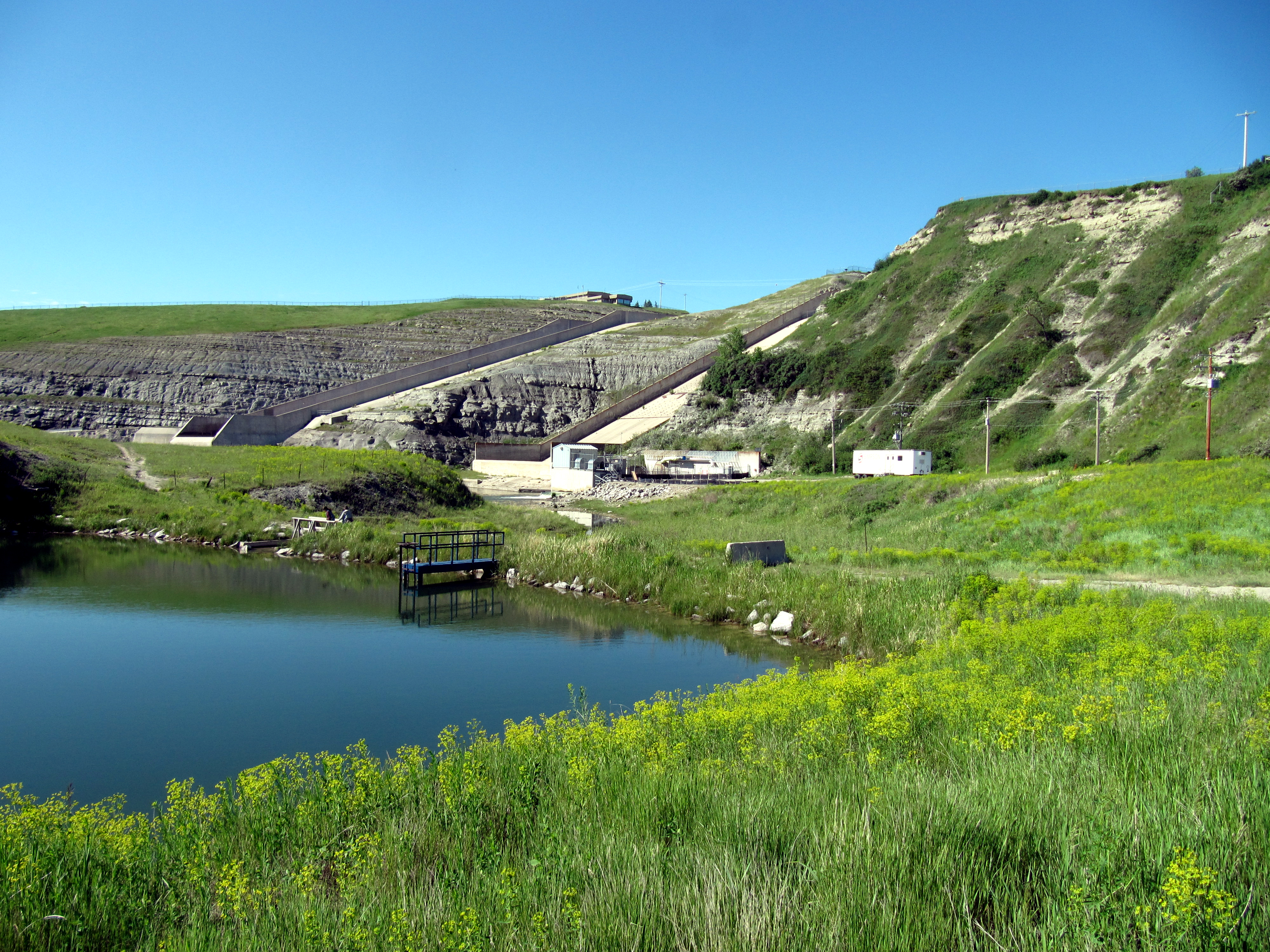
- Strata of the St. Mary River Formation at the St. Mary Reservoir spillway.
- Type: Geological formation
- Underlies: Willow Creek Formation
- Overlies: Bearpaw Formation
- Thickness: up to 762 metres (2,500 ft)

Lithology
- Primary: Sandstone, shale
- Other: Mudstone, coal

Location
- Coordinates: 49.6°N 114.1°W
- Approximate paleocoordinates: 49.6°N 86.5°W
- Region: Alberta, Montana
- Country: Canada, USA

Type section
- Named for: St. Mary River
- Named by: George Mercer Dawson
- Year defined: 1883
- St. Mary River Formation (Canada) St. Mary River Formation (Alberta)

The St. Mary River Formation is a geologic formation of Late Cretaceous (71.9-67 Ma) age of the Western Canada Sedimentary Basin in southwestern Alberta and northwesternmost Montana. It was first described from outcrops along the St. Mary River by George Mercer Dawson in 1883, and it takes its name from the river.

Fossils from the formation include remains of dinosaurs, as well as bivalve shells, plant fossils, and trace fossils.

== Lithology ==
The St. Mary River Formation is generally considered to consist of two units. The lower 30–60 meters (98–197 ft) of the formation was deposited in brackish water environments, and is characterized by fine-grained sandstones, grey shales, coquinoid beds, carbonaceous mudstones and coal beds. The remainder of the formation was deposited in freshwater fluvial and floodplain environments and is characterized by interbedded sandstone and siltstone, with minor occurrences of carbonaceous shale and coal.

== Thickness and distribution ==
The St. Mary River Formation is part of an eastward-thinning wedge of sediments derived from the erosion of the mountains to the west. It is about 762 metres (2,500 ft) thick in the exposures along the Crowsnest and Castle Rivers, and about 457 metres (1,500 ft) thick along the Oldman River.

== Relationship to other units ==
The St. Mary River Formation conformably overlies the Blood Reserve Sandstone, or the Bearpaw Formation where the Blood Reserve Sandstone is absent, and it is conformably overlain by the Willow Creek Formation. It extends from Glacier County, Montana to as far north as the Little Bow River in Alberta, where it grades into and intertongues with the contemporaneous strata of the Horseshoe Canyon Formation.

== Fossil content ==
=== Flora ===
Eighteen species of plant leaves were described from the St. Mary River Formation in 1949. More recent work downstream from the St. Mary Reservoir increased the total to at least 32 species. The assemblage includes remains of ferns, Ginkgo, conifers, a Trapa-like plant, and at least six types of large monocot leaves in addition to a sabaloid palm.

Plants
Genus	Species	Presence	Material	Notes	Images
Cardstonia	C. tolmanii	Near Cardston, Alberta.		Belongs in Limnocharitaceae.	
Hydropteris	H. pinnata	"Riverbank exposure on the north side of the St. Mary River approx. 50 m below the spillway of the St. Mary Reservoir, east of Cardston, Alberta."	Large segments of intact plants.	A hydropteridale fern.	
Tolmania	T. aquatica	Near Cardston, Alberta.	"Sixteen compression/ impression specimens".	A floating aquatic angiosperm.	
Trapago	T. angulata	Southern Alberta.	"Nearly 500 specimens of various isolated and attached organs".		
Zlatkovia	Z. crenulata	Near Cardston, Alberta.	"Sixty-seven coalified compression specimens of leaves, one attached to a stem".	An amphibious eudicot.	

=== Molluscs ===
Beds of Ostrea and Corbicula shells are common in the basal, brackish water portion of the formation. The overlying freshwater beds include shells of freshwater and terrestrial molluscs. Shells of unionid freshwater mussels are common in the fluvial sandstones.

=== Mammals ===
The mammals of the St. Mary River Formation were described by Sloan and Russell in 1974.

Mammals
Genus	Species	Presence	Material	Notes	Images
Cimolodon	C. nitidus	Locality 11, 15 miles north of Lundbreck, Alberta.	NMC 17667, a right M2.	A cimolodontid.	
Cimolomys	C. gracilis	Scabby Butte, Alberta.	"NMC 17662, 17663, 17664, 3 tooth fragments from at least 2 individuals."	A cimolomyid.	
Didelphodon?	D.? sp.	Scabby Butte, Alberta.	"ROM 7848, the badly worn trigonid of a right molar."		
Eodelphis?	E.? sp.	Scabby Butte, Alberta.	"ROM 7849, a worn, broken right molar".		
Leptalestes	L. toevsi	Montana.		A pediomyid.	
Meniscoessus	M. conquista	Scabby Butte, Alberta.	"3 teeth from at least 2 individuals (ROM 7846, 7847, 7850)".	A cimolomyid.	
Mesodma	M. cf. thompsoni	Scabby Butte, Alberta.	NMC 17665.		
Miacidae?	Genus and species undetermined.	Scabby Butte, Alberta.	"NMC 9821, trigonid of a left lower molar".	Assignment to Miacidae is tentative until the complete tooth is known.	
Nidimys	N. occultus	Montana.		A ptilodontoid.	
Paracimexomys	P. propriscus	Montana.		A multituberculate.	
Pediomys	P. cf. cooki	Scabby Butte, Alberta.	NMC 21307, buccal portion of right upper molar.		
Pediomys	P. cf. krejcii	Scabby Butte, Alberta.	NMC 9820, right M1.		
Ptilodontoidea	Genus and species indet.	Montana.	MOR 2535.	A ptilodontoid comparable in size to the smallest Mesodma species.	
Turgidodon	T. russelli	Montana.		An alphadontid.	

=== Dinosaurs ===
==== Dinosaur tracks ====
The St. Mary River Formation has produced relatively few dinosaur fossils from its outcrops in southwestern Alberta. However, footprints and trackways have been found along the St. Mary and Oldman Rivers. More than 100 track-bearing stratigraphic units were documented in one section 177 metres (580 ft) thick, which is one of the highest densities of track-bearing layers reported from any succession. One footprint from the formation includes the first record of skin impressions from the bottom of a hadrosaur foot.

==== Ornithischians ====
Ornithischians
Genus	Species	Location	Stratigraphic position	Material	Notes	Images
Anchiceratops	A. ornatus	Alberta			Remains later found to be referrable to Anchiceratops, but it's not known what species.	Montanoceratops Pachyrhinosaurus
Edmontonia	E. longiceps	Alberta				Montanoceratops Pachyrhinosaurus
Montanoceratops	M. cerorhynchus	Montana				Montanoceratops Pachyrhinosaurus
Pachyrhinosaurus	P. canadensis	Alberta				Montanoceratops Pachyrhinosaurus
Regaliceratops	R. peterhewsi	Alberta				Montanoceratops Pachyrhinosaurus

==== Theropods ====
Theropods
Genus	Species	Location	Stratigraphic position	Material	Notes	Images
Albertosaurus		Alberta				
Saurornitholestes	cf. Saurornitholestes sp.	Alberta				
Troodon	Troodon sp."	Alberta				

Color key: Taxon / Reclassified taxon / Taxon falsely reported as present / Dubious taxon or junior synonym / Ichnotaxon / Ootaxon / Morphotaxon	Notes; Uncertain or tentative taxa are in small text; ~~crossed out~~ taxa are discredited.

== See also ==
- List of dinosaur-bearing rock formations
