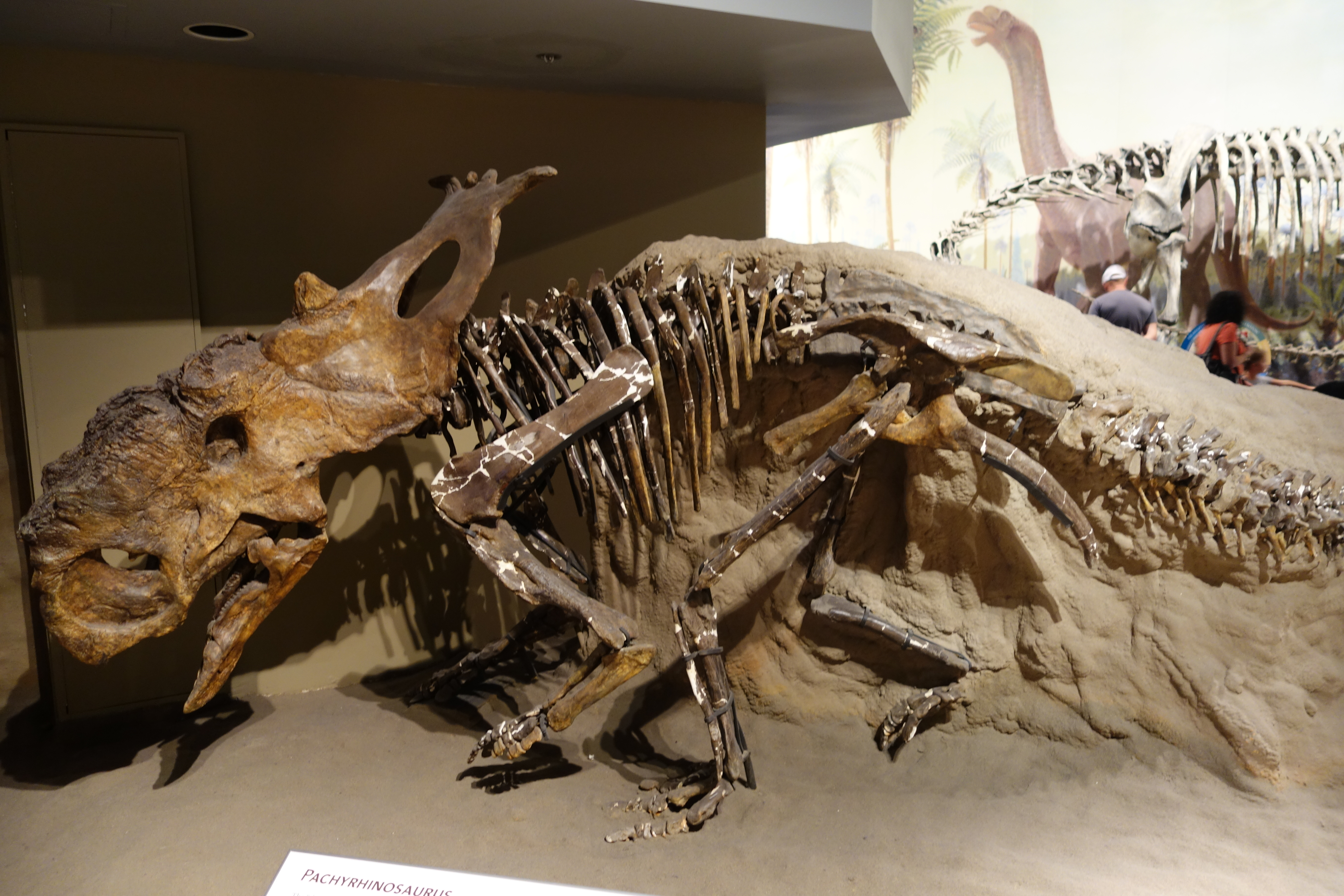
- P. lakustai composite skeleton, Royal Tyrrell Museum

Scientific classification
- Kingdom: Animalia
- Phylum: Chordata
- Class: Reptilia
- Clade: Dinosauria
- Clade: †Ornithischia
- Clade: †Ceratopsia
- Family: †Ceratopsidae
- Subfamily: †Centrosaurinae
- Tribe: †Pachyrhinosaurini
- Clade: †Pachyrostra
- Genus: †Pachyrhinosaurus; Sternberg, 1950

Type species
- †Pachyrhinosaurus canadensis Sternberg, 1950

Other species
- †P. lakustai Currie, Langston & Tanke, 2008; †P. perotorum Fiorillo & Tykoski, 2012

= Pachyrhinosaurus =

Pachyrhinosaurus Temporal range: Campanian to Maastrichtian, 73.5–71 Ma

Ceratopsid dinosaur genus from Late Cretaceous US and Canada

Pachyrhinosaurus (from Ancient Greek παχύς (pachys), thick; ῥίς (rhis), nose; and σαυρος (sauros), lizard) is a genus of centrosaurine ceratopsid dinosaur from the Late Cretaceous period of North America. The first examples were discovered by Charles M. Sternberg in Alberta, Canada, in 1946, and named in 1950. Over a dozen partial skulls and a large assortment of other fossils from various species have been found in Alberta and Alaska. A great number were not available for study until the 1980s, resulting in a relatively recent increase of interest in Pachyrhinosaurus.

Three species have been identified. P. lakustai, from the Wapiti Formation, the bonebed horizon of which is roughly equivalent in age to the upper Bearpaw and lower Horseshoe Canyon Formations, is known to have existed from about 73.5–72.5 million years ago. P. canadensis is younger, known from the lower Horseshoe Canyon Formation, about 73–71 Ma ago and the St. Mary River Formation. Fossils of the northernmost species, P. perotorum, have been recovered from the Prince Creek Formation of Alaska, and date to 73 Ma ago. The presence of three known species makes this genus the most speciose among the centrosaurines.

== Discovery and species ==
=== Pachyrhinosaurus canadensis ===
Pachyrhinosaurus canadensis, was described in 1950 by Charles Mortram Sternberg based on the holotype incomplete skull NMC 8867, and the paratype incomplete skull NMC 8866, which included the anterior part of the skull but was lacking the right lower mandible, and the "beak". These skulls were collected in 1945 and 1946 from the sandy clay of the Horseshoe Canyon Formation in Alberta, Canada. In the years to come, additional material would be recovered at the Scabby Butte locality of the St. Mary River Formation near Lethbridge, Alberta, from terrestrial sediments considered to be between 74 and 66 million years old. These were among the first dinosaur sites found in the province, in the 1880s. The significance of these discoveries was not understood until shortly after World War II when preliminary excavations were conducted.

Another Pachyrhinosaurus skull was taken out of the Scabby Butte locality in 1955, and then in 1957 Wann Langston Jr. and a small crew excavated additional pachyrhinosaur remains. The University of Calgary has plans to reopen this important site some day as a field school for university-level paleontology students. Several specimens, NMC 21863, NMC 21864, NMC 10669 assigned in 1975 by W. Langston Jr. to Pachyrhinosaurus were also recovered at the Scabby Butte locality.

=== Pachyrhinosaurus lakustai ===
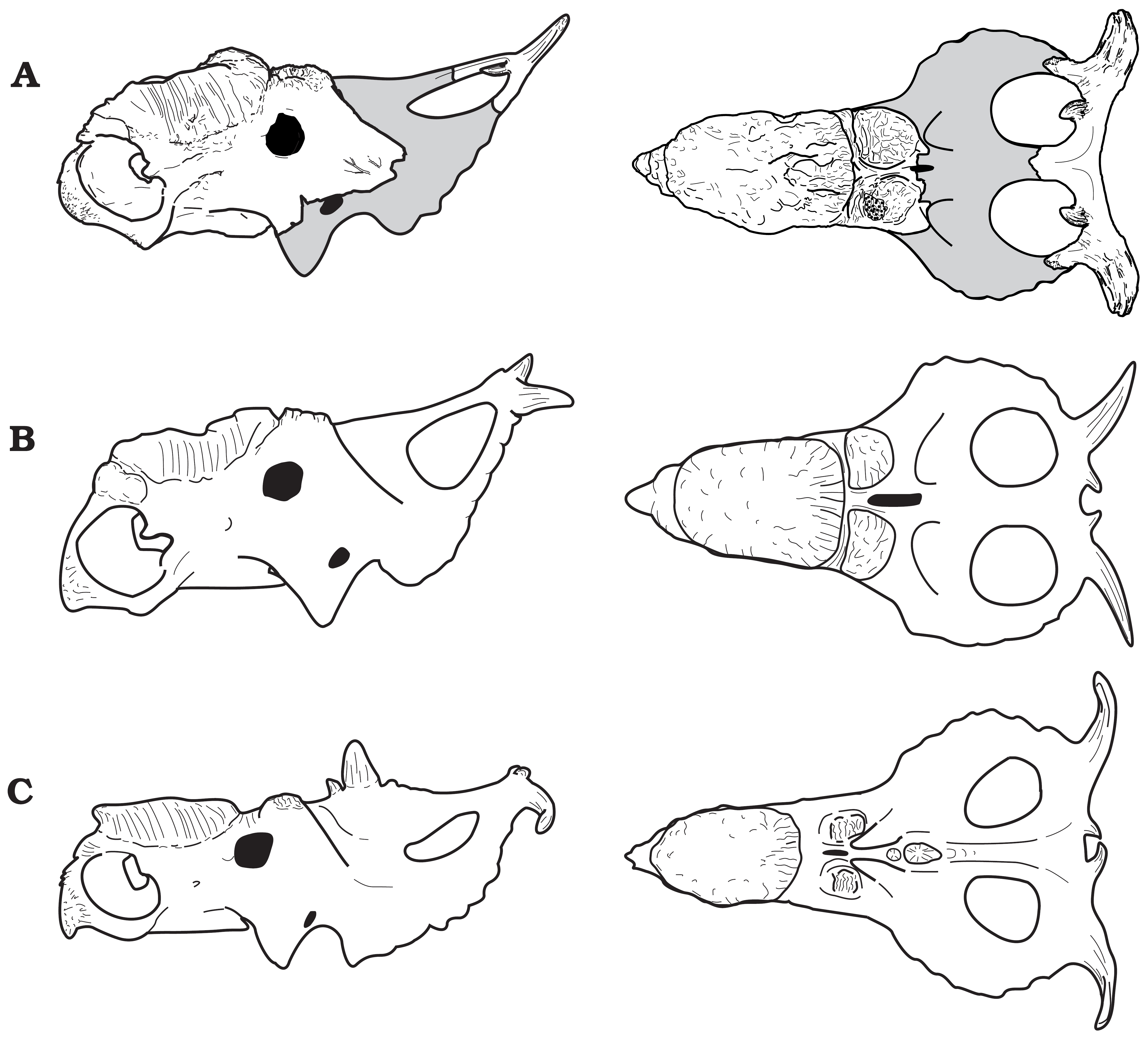
Skulls of the three species compared: P. perotorum (with inaccurate epiparietal placement), P. canadensis, and P. lakustai

Another Pachyrhinosaurus bonebed, on the Wapiti River south of Wembley in northwestern Alberta, was worked briefly by staff of the Royal Tyrrell Museum in the late 1980s but is now worked annually each summer (since 2015) by the Philip J. Currie Dinosaur Museum in Wembley, Alberta. Material from this site appears referable to Pachyrhinosaurus canadensis.

In 1974, Grande Prairie, Alberta science teacher Al Lakusta found a large bonebed along Pipestone Creek in Alberta. When the area was finally excavated between 1986 and 1989 by staff and volunteers of the Royal Tyrrell Museum of Palaeontology, paleontologists discovered an amazingly large and dense selection of bones—up to 100 per square metre, with a total of 3,500 bones and 14 skulls. This was apparently the site of a mass mortality, perhaps a failed attempt to cross a river during a flood. Found amongst the fossils were the skeletons of four distinct age groups ranging from juveniles to full-grown dinosaurs, indicating that the Pachyrhinosaurus cared for their young. The adult skulls had both convex and concave bosses as well as unicorn-style horns on the parietal bone just behind their eyes. The concave boss types might be related to erosion only and not reflect male/female differences.

In 2008, a detailed monograph describing the skull of the Pipestone Creek pachyrhinosaur, and penned by Philip J. Currie, Wann Langston Jr., and Darren Tanke, classified the specimen as a second species of Pachyrhinosaurus, named P. lakustai after its discoverer.

In 2024, excavation at Pipestone Creek by the Philip J. Currie Dinosaur Museum unearthed one of the largest known P. lakustai skulls. The specimen came to be known as "Big Sam" (PCB.2024.666). The 138 cm long skull has a nasal boss that is 43 cm in diameter. The 1-3 spikes that normally ran down the middle of the frill in P. lakustai was strongly reduced in this specimen. As of October 2025, the specimen is still being prepared.

=== Pachyrhinosaurus perotorum ===
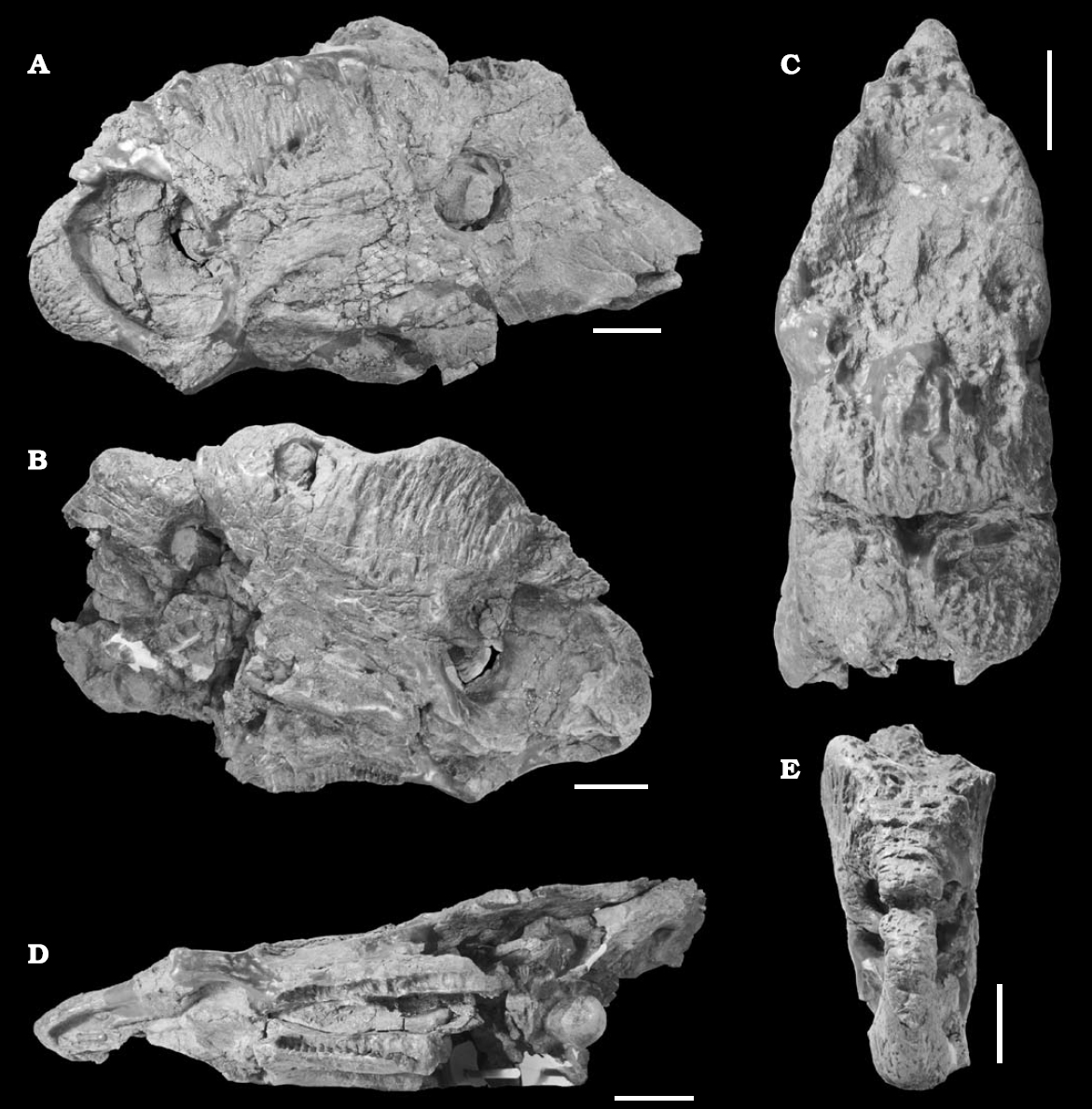
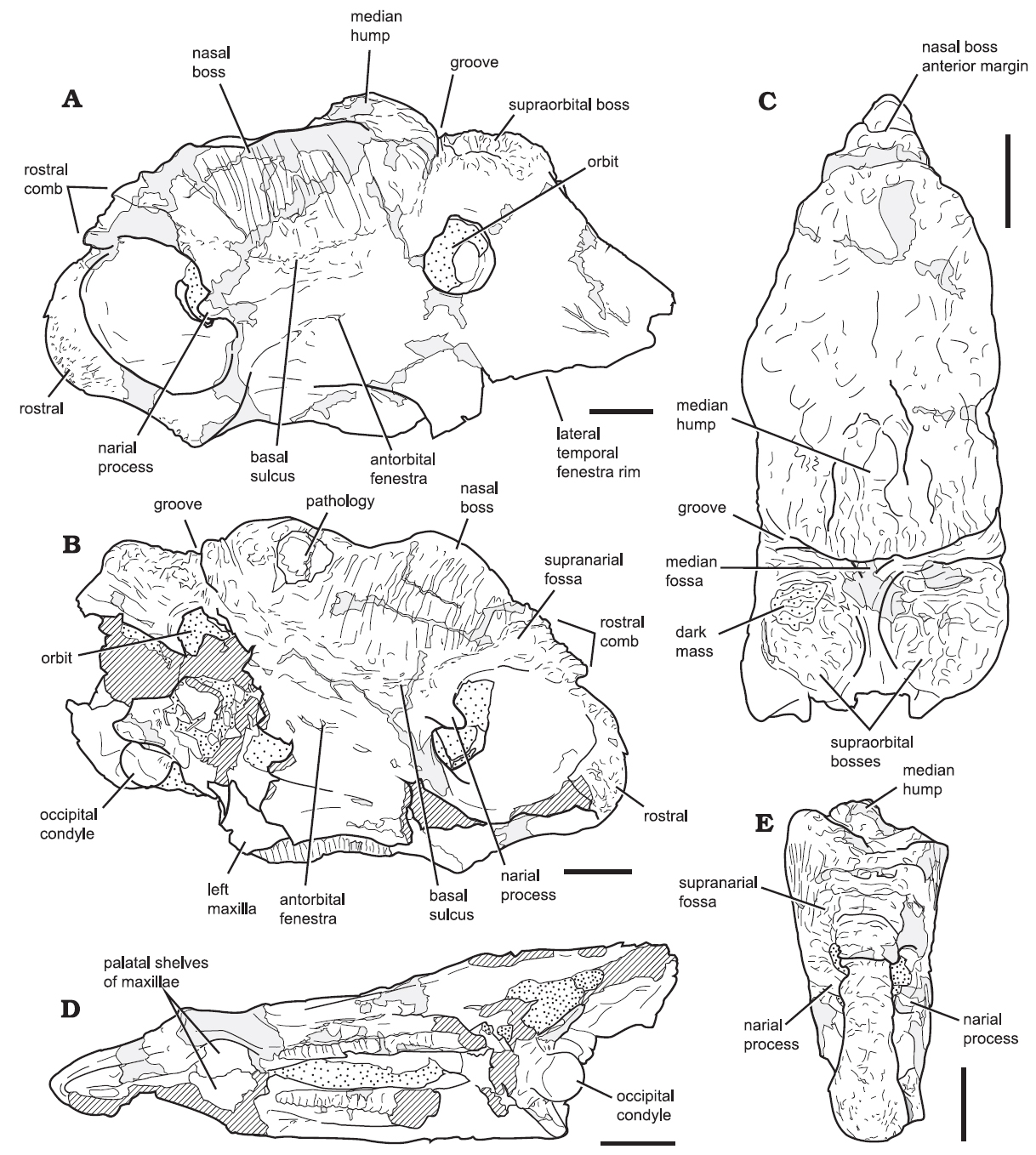
P. perotorum paratype skull and diagram

In 2012, Fiorillo & Tykoski described Pachyrhinosaurus perotorum. This Alaskan species was named after the Texas oil billionaire and benefactor, Ross Perot.

In 2013, Fiorillo et al. described an incomplete nasal bone attributable to Pachyrhinosaurus perotorum which was collected from the Kikak-Tegoseak Quarry on the Colville River in Alaska. This bone, designated DMNH 21460 belongs to an immature individual. This discovery expands the known age profile of this dinosaur genus from this particular site. The specimen has nasal ornamentation that is dorsally enlarged, representing an intermediate stage of growth. Of note, the authors pointed out that the posterior part of the nasal shows evidence for "a degree of integument complexity not previously recognized in other species" of Pachyrhinosaurus. It was determined that the dorsal surface of the nasal boss bore a thick, cornified pad and sheath.

=== Additional specimens ===
Possible specimens of an unnamed Pachyrhinosaurus species are known from the Summit Creek Formation in the Northwest Territories of Canada.

== Description ==
Size comparison of P. canadensis

Size estimates for the largest Pachyrhinosaurus species, P. canadensis indicate lengths of 6–8 metres (19.7–26.2 ft) and a weight of 3–4 tonnes (3.3–4.4 tons). The other species, P. lakustai and P. perotorum, have been estimated by Greg Paul at 5 metres (16.4 ft) in length and 2 tonnes (2.2 tons) in weight. They were herbivorous and possessed strong cheek teeth batteries to help them cut tough, fibrous plants.

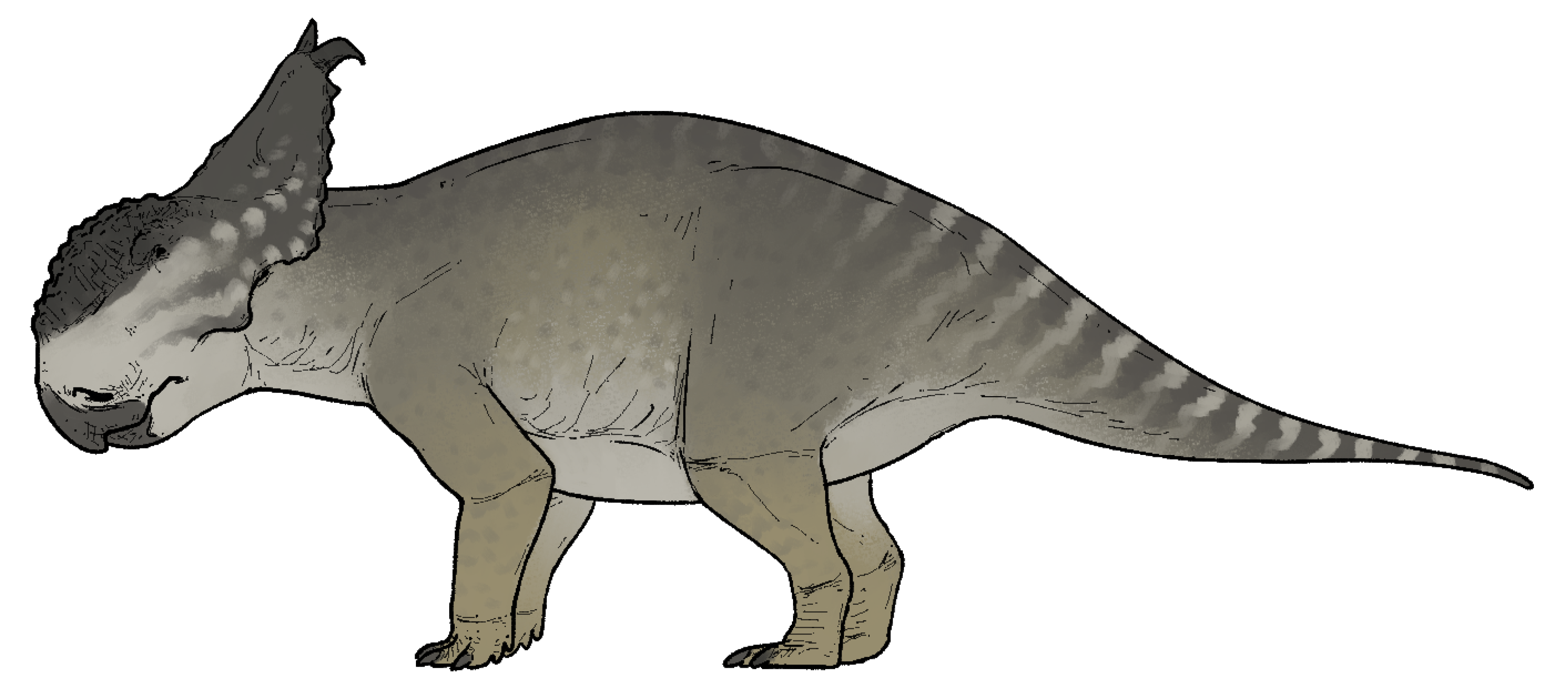
Restoration of P. canadensis

Instead of horns, their skulls bore massive, flattened bosses: a large boss over the nose and a smaller one over the eyes. A prominent pair of horns grew from the frill and extended upwards. The skull also bore several smaller horns or ornaments that varied between individuals and between species. In P. canadensis and P. perotorum, the bosses over the nose and eyes nearly grew together, and were separated only by a narrow groove. In P. lakustai, the two bosses were separated by a wide gap. In P. canadensis and P. lakustai, the frill bore two additional small, curved, backward-pointed horns. P. perotorum was thought to have two unique, flattened horns which projected forward and down from the top edge of the frill, but 2019 it was shown that these had been inaccurately reconstructed and it instead had the same backward pointed horns as its sister species.

Various ornaments of the nasal boss have also been used to distinguish between different species of Pachyrhinosaurus. Both P. lakustai and P. perotorum bore a jagged, comb-like extension at the tip of the boss which was missing in P. canadensis. P. perotorum was unique in having a narrow dome in the middle of the back portion of the nasal boss, and P. lakustai had a pommel-like structure projecting from the front of the boss (the boss of P. canadensis was mainly flat on top and rounded). P. lakustai bore another comb-like horn arising from the middle of the frill behind the eyes.

== Classification ==
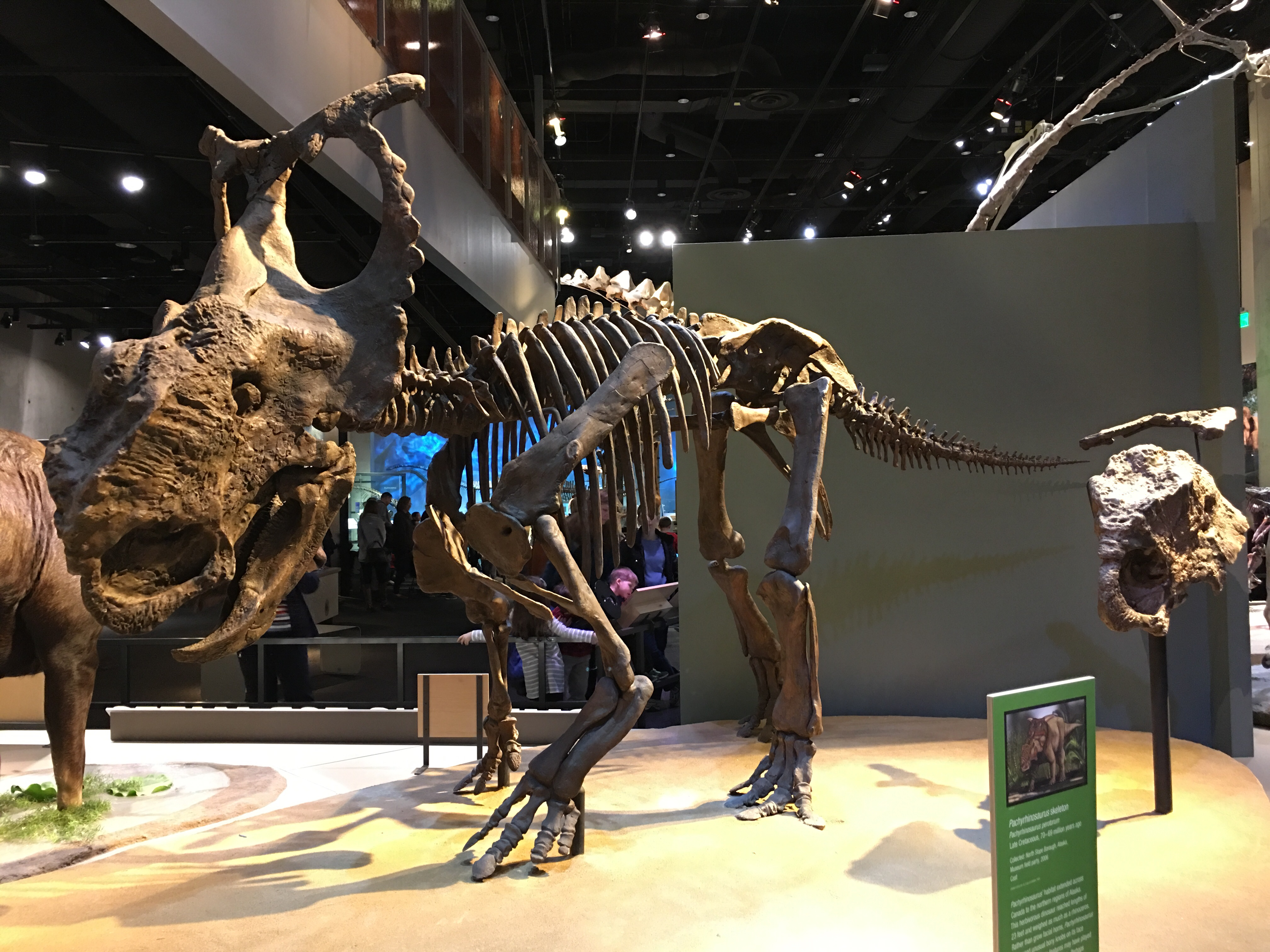
P. perotorum mounted at the Perot Museum; note the small forwards pointing epiparietals at the top of the frill, which were inaccurately reconstructed following the original description, while these would actually have faced up like in the other species.

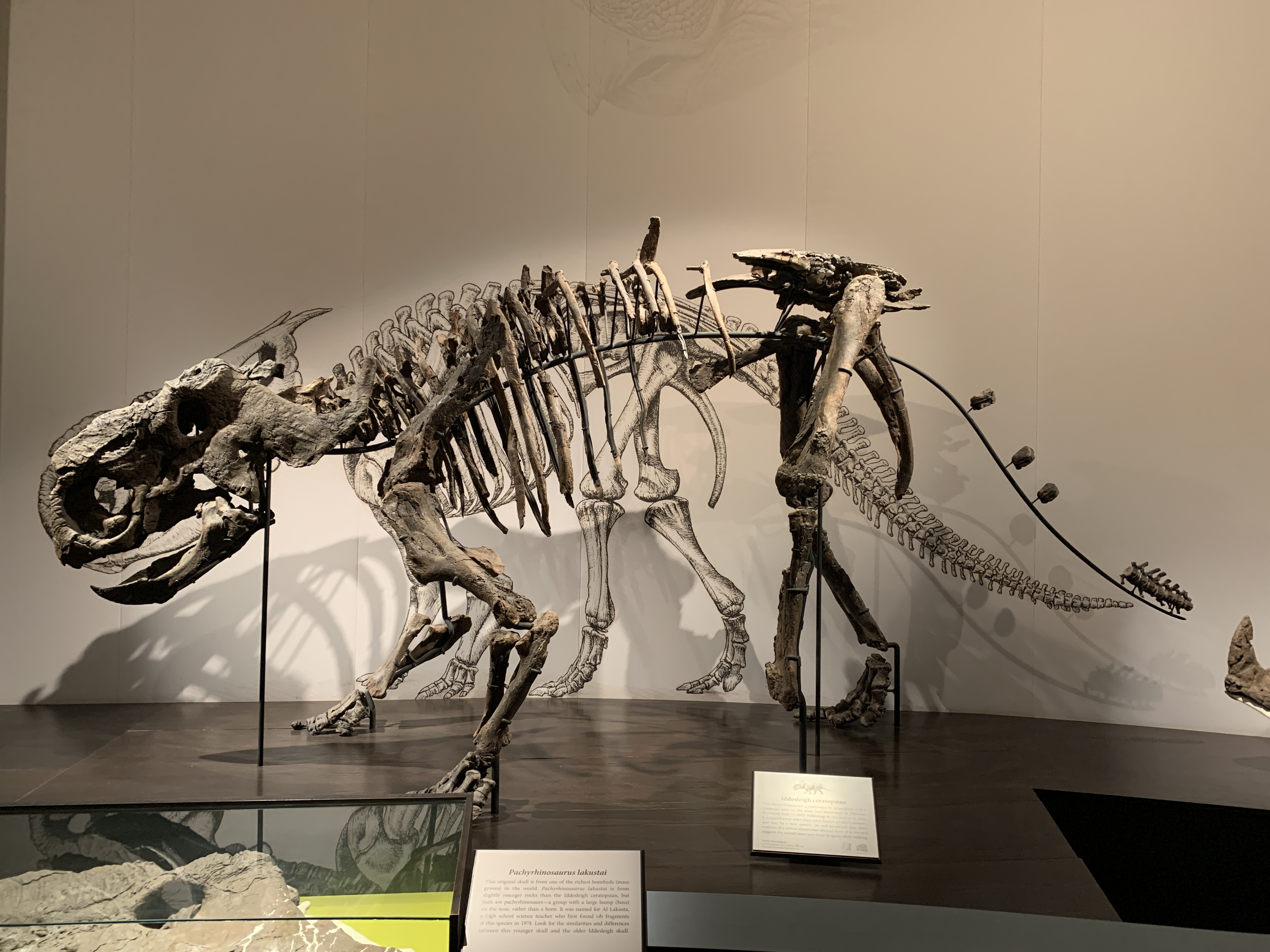
TMP 2002.76.1, which may be a specimen of Pachyrhinosaurus, Achelousaurus, or a new taxon, in Royal Tyrrell Museum

The cladogram below shows the phylogenetic position of all currently known Pachyrhinosaurus species following Chiba et al. (2017):

- Centrosaurinae
  - - Diabloceratops eatoni
    - Machairoceratops cronusi
  - - Nasutoceratopsini
      - Avaceratops lammersi (ANSP 15800)
      - MOR 692
      - CMN 8804
      - Nasutoceratops titusi
      - Malta new taxon
    - - Xenoceratops foremostensis
      - - - Sinoceratops zhuchengensis
          - Wendiceratops pinhornensis
        - Albertaceratops nesmoi
        - Medusaceratops lokii
        - Eucentrosaura
          - Centrosaurini
            - - Rubeosaurus ovatus
              - Styracosaurus albertensis
            - - Coronosaurus brinkmani
              - - Centrosaurus apertus
                - Spinops sternbergorum
          - Pachyrhinosaurini
            - Einiosaurus procurvicornis
            - Pachyrostra
              - Achelousaurus horneri
              - - Pachyrhinosaurus canadensis
                - - Pachyrhinosaurus lakustai
                  - Pachyrhinosaurus perotorum

== Paleobiology ==
In the Prince Creek Formation, P. perotorum engaged in niche partitioning with Edmontosaurus; the latter favoured lowland deltas while the former preferred more upland environments.

=== Growth rates ===
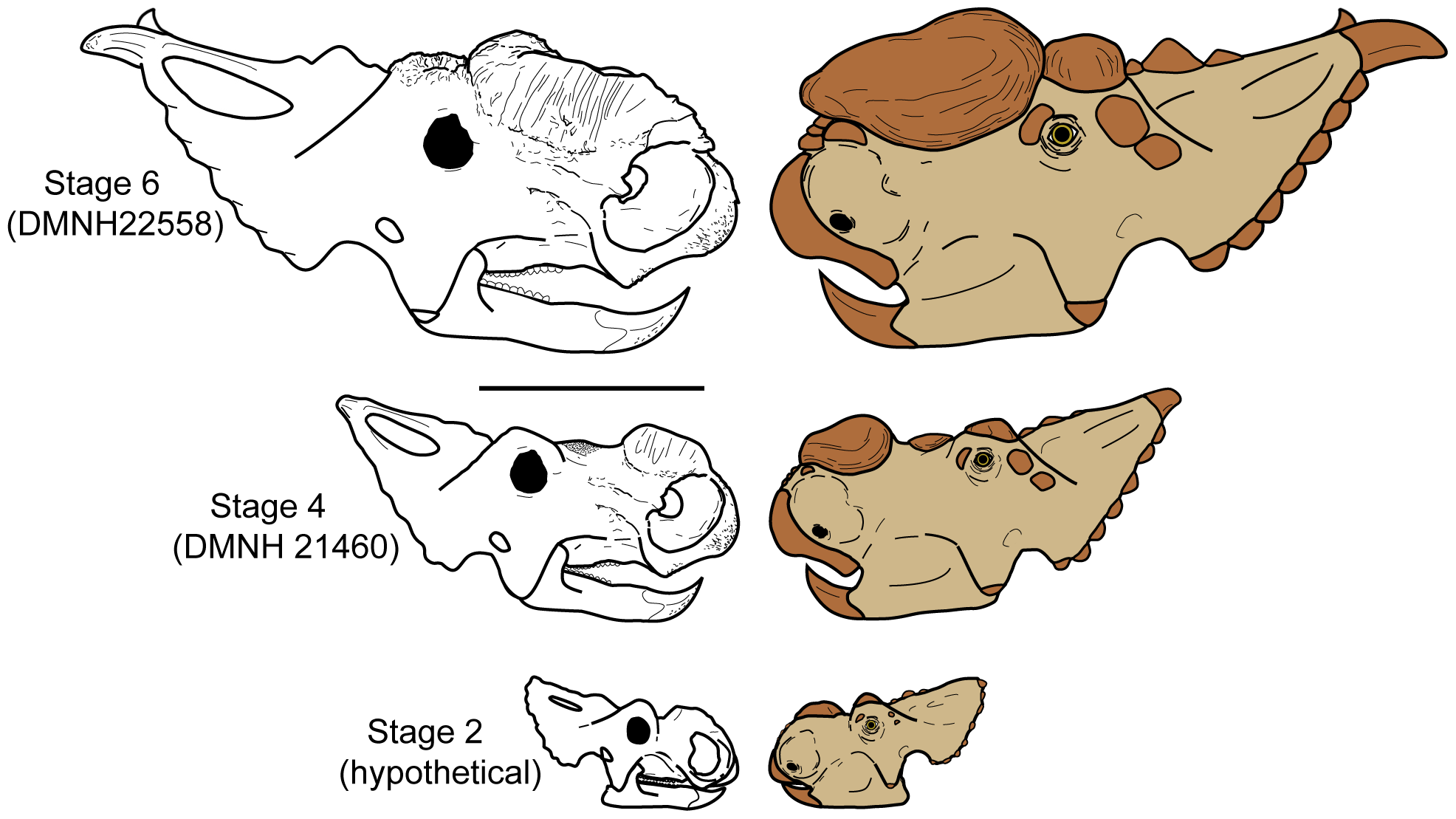
Skull differences between different growth stages of P. perotorum

During the first few years of development, P. perotorum show extremely rapid growth. When the animals were one year old, they had already reached 28% of their adult body size. By age two, they were almost half the size of a mature adult. However, the rate of growth slows considerably after that, and maximum size is not fully attained until about age twenty. The development of characteristics useful in sexual selection, including competition between males, such as pronounced nasal bosses, occurred at approximately nine years of age. This presumably corresponds to the age of sexual maturity.

Unlike other Pachyrhinosaurus species, P. perotorum shows highly conspicuous growth banding in the bones, indicating retarded growth during the winter. This is perhaps not surprising, considering that P. perotorum experienced much harsher winters than southerly species within the genus.

P. lakustai does not show growth banding early in ontogeny in the specimens that have been examined. However, growth bands are weakly expressed later in ontogeny. This probably indicates rapid growth in youth, followed by gradually decreasing growth rates as the animal neared adulthood. The growth curve of the animal would therefore be somewhat asymptotic, unlike the linear growth found in many ectothermic animals.

The development of characteristics useful in sexual selection, including competition between males, such as pronounced nasal bosses, occurred when the dinosaur was roughly 73% the size of a full-grown adult. The age of sexual maturity is unknown. Due to the lack of conspicuous growth banding, more detailed analyses of P. lakustai growth rates cannot be performed.

=== Palaeopathology ===
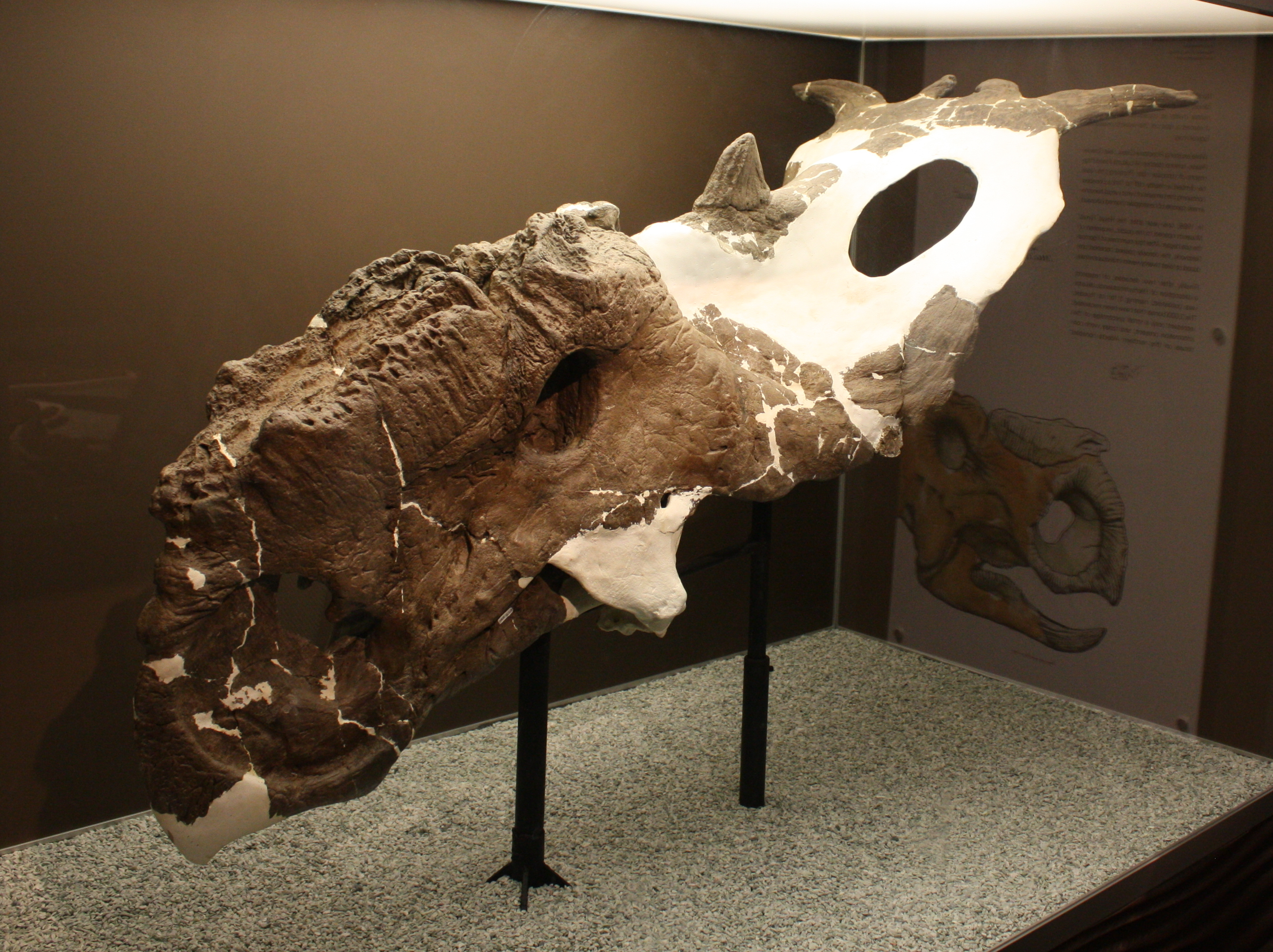
"Harvey" (TMP 1989.055.1234), showing the left, non-pathological side.

P. perotorum had very low rates of palaeopathologies compared to ceratopsians that inhabited lower latitudes, suggesting that the high latitude environment of Alaska did not impose unique hardships on the species.

A skull of P. lakustai was found with severe lesions on the right side of the skull. The largest of these lesions was 195 mm in diameter, and harboured an additional large lesion inside it. This resulted in a massive hole on the right side of the face, so deep that bones of the left side of the skull are visible within the hole. This hole also partially destroyed the right eye socket, which probably would've rendered the animal blind on that side. This affliction did not kill the animal; this individual died as part of a mass death assemblage alongside many of its herd mates. This specimen came to be known as "Harvey" (TMP 1989.055.1234), after the DC Comics character Harvey Dent.

== Paleoecology ==
=== St. Mary River Formation ===
==== Habitat ====
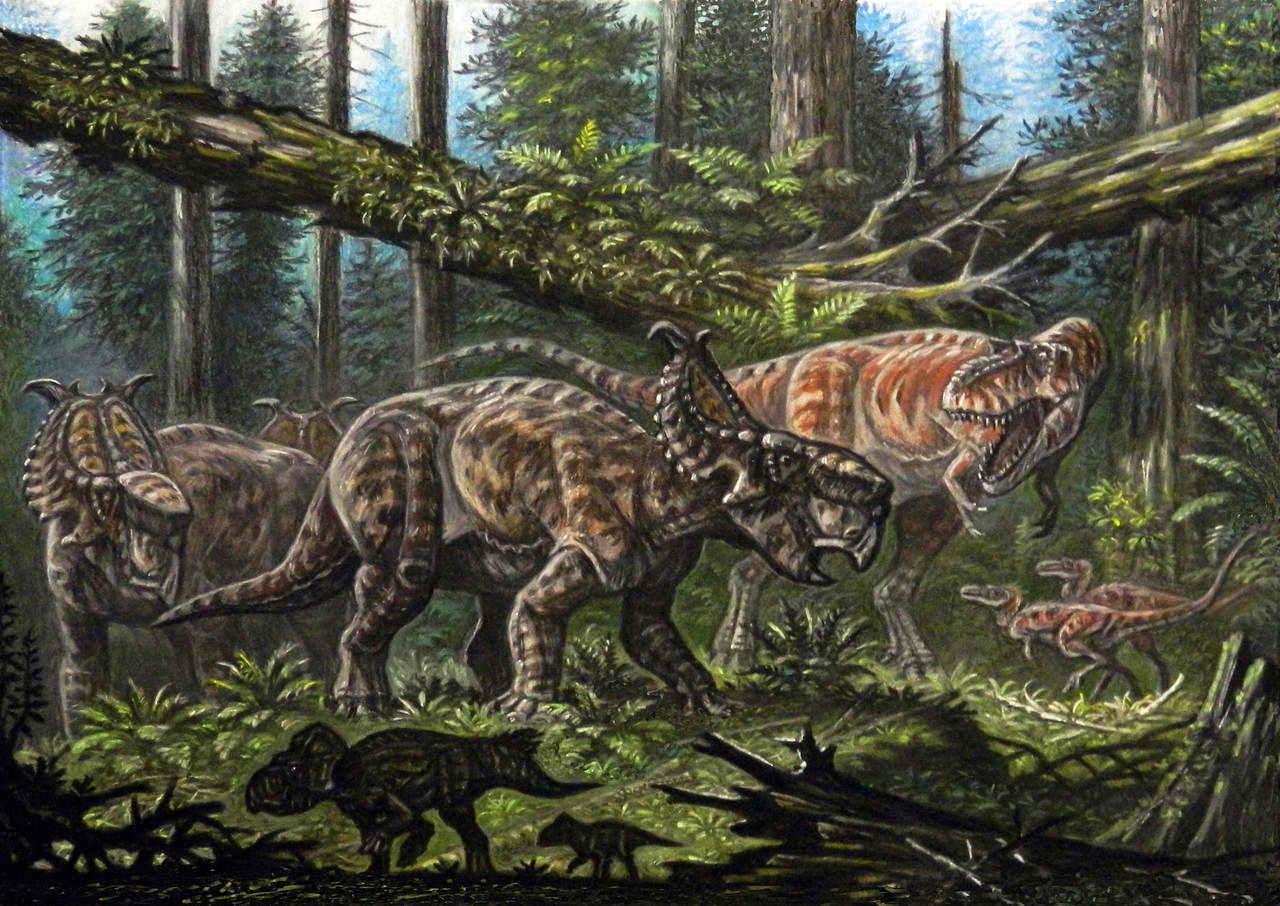
Restoration of a confrontation between P. canadensis and Albertosaurus

The St. Mary River Formation has not undergone a definitive radiometric dating, however, the available stratigraphic correlation has shown that this formation was deposited between 74 and 66 million years ago, during the Campanian and the late Maastrichtian, during the final regression of the mid-continental Bearpaw Seaway. It ranges from as far south as Glacier County, Montana to as far north as the Little Bow River in Alberta. The St. Mary River Formation is part of the Western Canadian Sedimentary Basin in southwestern Alberta, which extends from the Rocky Mountains in the west to the Canadian Shield in the east. It is laterally equivalent to the Horseshoe Canyon Formation. The region where dinosaurs lived was bounded by mountains to the west, and included ancient channels, small freshwater ponds, streams, and floodplains.

==== Paleofauna ====
Pachyrhinosaurus shared its paleoenvironment with other dinosaurs, such as the ceratopsians Anchiceratops and Montanoceratops cerorhynchus, the armored nodosaur Edmontonia longiceps, the duckbilled hadrosaur Edmontosaurus regalis, the theropods Saurornitholestes and Troodon, possibly the ornithopod Thescelosaurus, and the tyrannosaurid Albertosaurus, which was likely the apex predator in its ecosystem. Vertebrates present in the St. Mary River Formation at the time of Pachyrhinosaurus included the actinopterygian fishes Amia fragosa, Lepisosteus, Belonostomus, Paralbula casei, and Platacodon nanus, the mosasaur Plioplatecarpus, the turtle Boremys and the diapsid reptile Champsosaurus. A fair number of mammals lived in this region, which included Turgidodon russelli, Cimolestes, Didelphodon, Leptalestes, Cimolodon nitidus, and Paracimexomys propriscus. Non-vertebrates in this ecosystem included mollusks, the oyster Crassostrea wyomingensis, the small clam Anomia, and the snail Thiara. Flora of the region include the aquatic angiosperm Trapago angulata, the amphibious heterosporous fern Hydropteris pinnata, rhizomes, and taxodiaceous conifers.

=== Horseshoe Canyon Formation ===
==== Habitat ====
The Horseshoe Canyon Formation has been radiometrically dated as being between 74 and 67 million years old. It was deposited during the gradual withdrawal of the Western Interior Seaway, during the Campanian and Maastrichtian stage of the Late Cretaceous period. The Horseshoe Canyon Formation is a terrestrial unit which is part of the Edmonton Group that includes the Battle Formation and the Whitemud Member, both in Edmonton. The valley where dinosaurs lived included ancient meandering estuary channels, straight channels, peat swamps, river deltas, floodplains, shorelines and wetlands. Due to the changing sea levels, many different environments are represented in the Horseshoe Canyon Formation, including offshore and near-shore marine habitats and coastal habitats like lagoons, and tidal flats. The area was wet and warm with a temperate to subtropical climate. Just prior to the Campanian–Maastrichtian boundary, the mean annual temperature and precipitation in this region dropped rapidly. The dinosaurs from this formation form part of the Edmontonian land vertebrate age, and are distinct from those in the formations above and below.

Modern life at high elevations in lower latitudes resembles life at low elevation in higher latitudes. There may be parallels to this phenomenon in Cretaceous ecosystems, for instance, Pachyrhinosaurus species are found in both Alaska and upland environments in southern Alberta. During the Edmontonian, in North America's northern biome, there is a general trend of reduced centrosaurine diversity, with only Pachyrhinosaurus surviving. Pachyrhinosaurus appears to have been part of a coastal fauna characterized by an association with Edmontosaurus.

==== Paleofauna ====
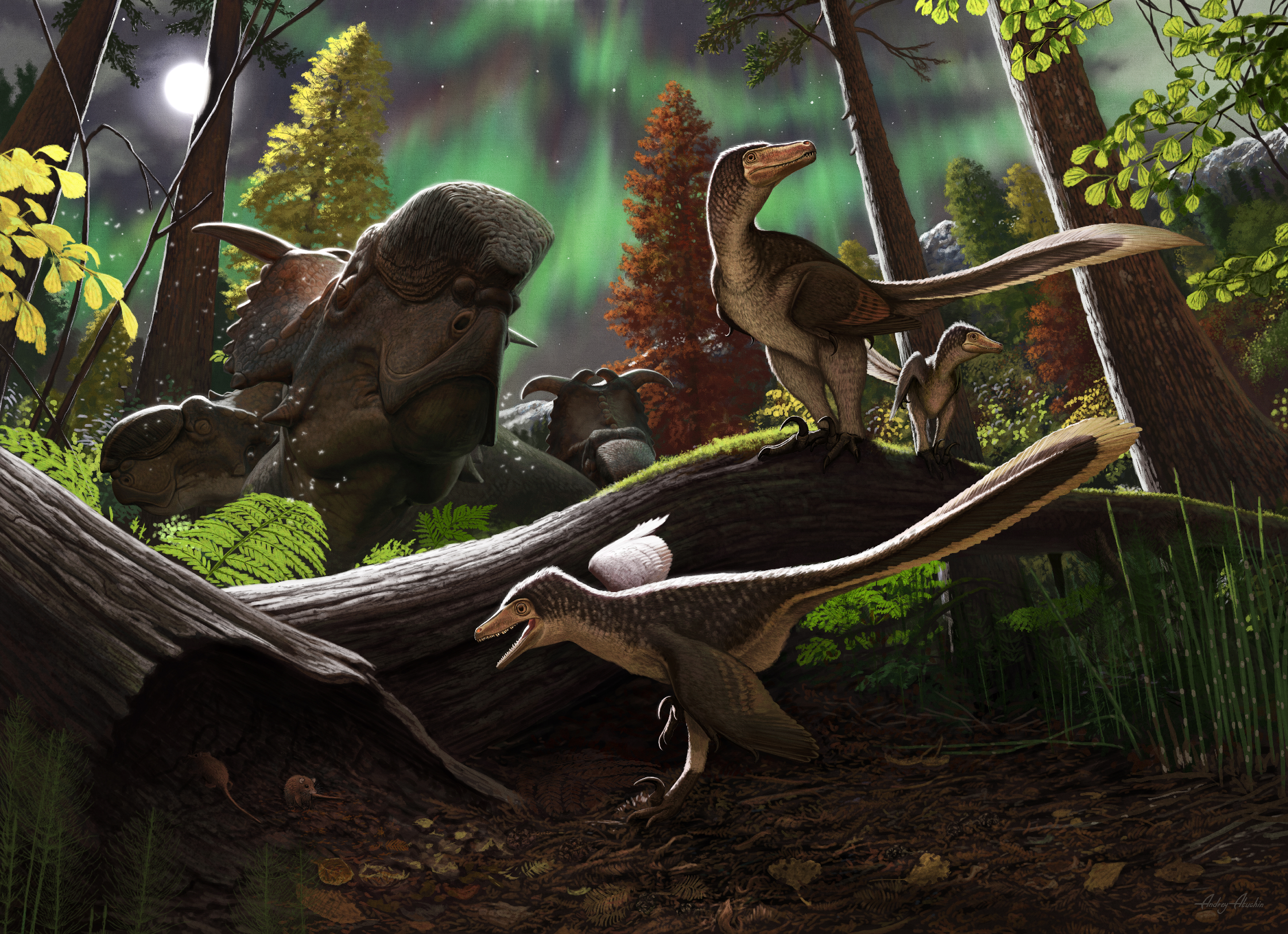
A herd of P. perotorum resting next to contemporaneous paleofauna from the Prince Creek Formation

P. canadensis coexisted with ankylosaurids Anodontosaurus lambei and Edmontonia longiceps, the maniraptorans Atrociraptor marshalli, Epichirostenotes curriei, the troodontid Albertavenator curriei, the alvarezsaurid theropod Albertonykus borealis, the ornithomimids Dromiceiomimus brevitertius, Ornithomimus edmontonicus, and an unnamed species of Struthiomimus, the dome-skulled pachycephalosaurids Stegoceras, and Sphaerotholus edmontonensis, the ornithopod Parksosaurus warreni, the hadrosaurids Edmontosaurus regalis, Hypacrosaurus altispinus, and Saurolophus osborni, the ceratopsians Anchiceratops ornatus, Arrhinoceratops brachyops, Eotriceratops xerinsularis, Montanoceratops cerorhynchus, and the tyrannosaurid Albertosaurus sarcophagus, which was the apex predator of this paleoenvironment. Of these, the hadrosaurs dominated in terms of sheer number and made up half of all dinosaurs who lived in this region. Vertebrates present in the Horseshoe Canyon Formation at the time of Pachyrhinosaurus included reptiles, and amphibians. Sharks, rays, sturgeons, bowfins, gars and the gar-like Belonostomus made up the fish fauna. Reptiles such as turtles and crocodilians are rare in the Horseshoe Canyon Formation, and this was thought to reflect the relatively cool climate which prevailed at the time. A study by Quinney et al. (2013), however, showed that the decline in turtle diversity, which was previously attributed to climate, coincided instead with changes in soil drainage conditions, and was limited by aridity, landscape instability, and migratory barriers. The saltwater plesiosaur Leurospondylus was present and freshwater environments were populated by turtles, Champsosaurus, and crocodilians like Leidyosuchus and Stangerochampsa. Evidence has shown that multituberculates and the early marsupial Didelphodon coyi were present. Vertebrate trace fossils from this region included the tracks of theropods, ceratopsians and ornithopods, which provide evidence that these animals were also present. Non-vertebrates in this ecosystem included both marine and terrestrial invertebrates.

== See also ==
- Timeline of ceratopsian research
