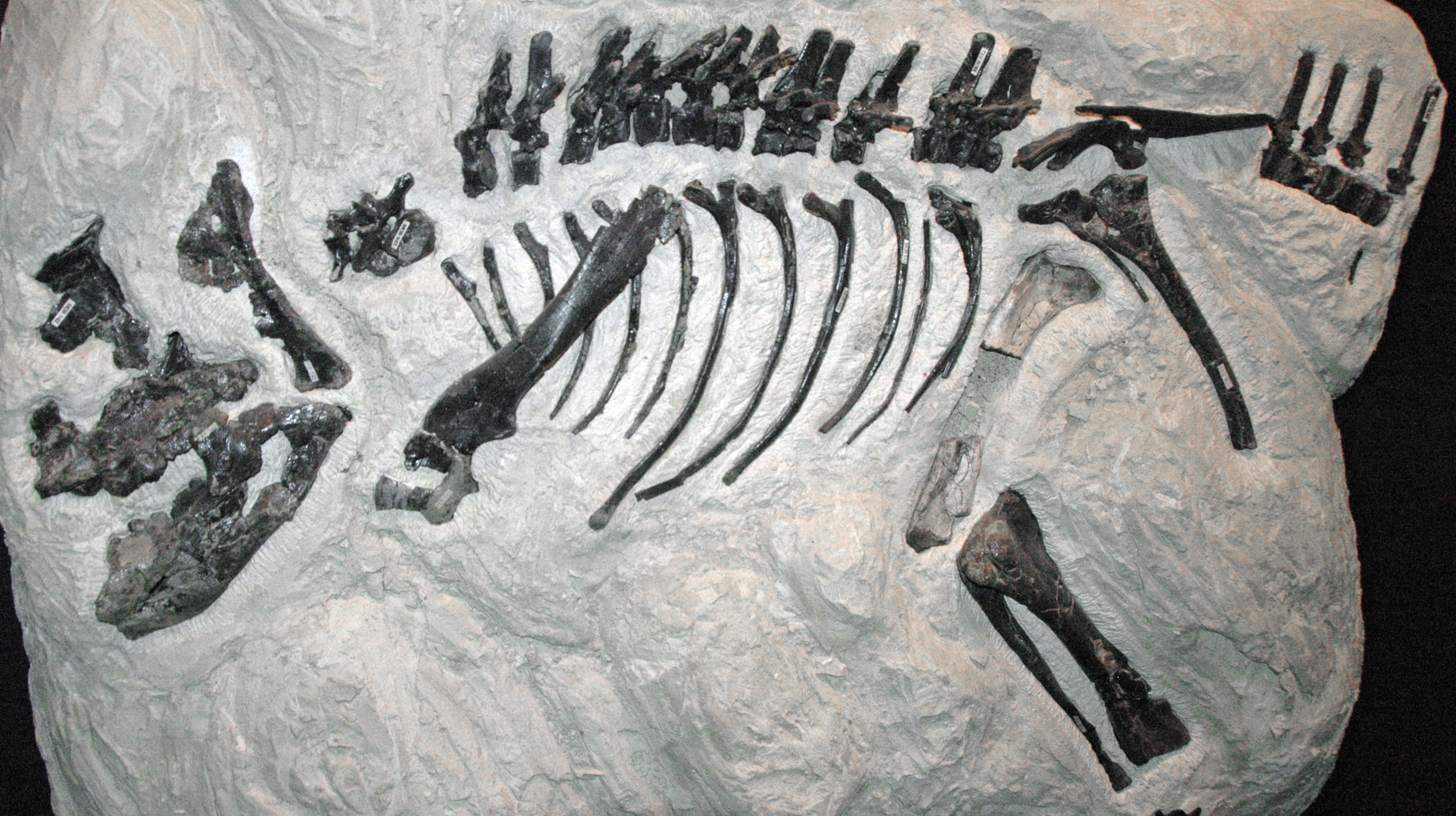
- Juvenile specimen from Montana, MOR 542

Scientific classification
- Kingdom: Animalia
- Phylum: Chordata
- Class: Reptilia
- Clade: Dinosauria
- Clade: †Ornithischia
- Clade: †Ceratopsia
- Family: †Leptoceratopsidae
- Genus: †Montanoceratops; Sternberg, 1951
- Species: †M. cerorhynchus

Binomial name
- †Montanoceratops cerorhynchus (Brown & Schlaikjer, 1942)

Synonyms
- Leptoceratops cerorhynchus (Brown & Schlaikjer, 1942)

= Montanoceratops =

Montanoceratops Temporal range: Early Maastrichtian, 70 Ma

Extinct genus of dinosaurs

Montanoceratops /mɒnˌtænoʊˈsɛrətɒps/ is an extinct genus of small ceratopsian dinosaur that lived approximately 70 million years ago during the latter part of the Cretaceous Period in what is now Montana and Alberta. Montanoceratops was a small sized, moderately-built, ground-dwelling, quadrupedal herbivore, that could grow up to an estimated 2.5 m (8.2 ft) in length and 170 kg (370 lb) in body mass.

== Discovery and species ==
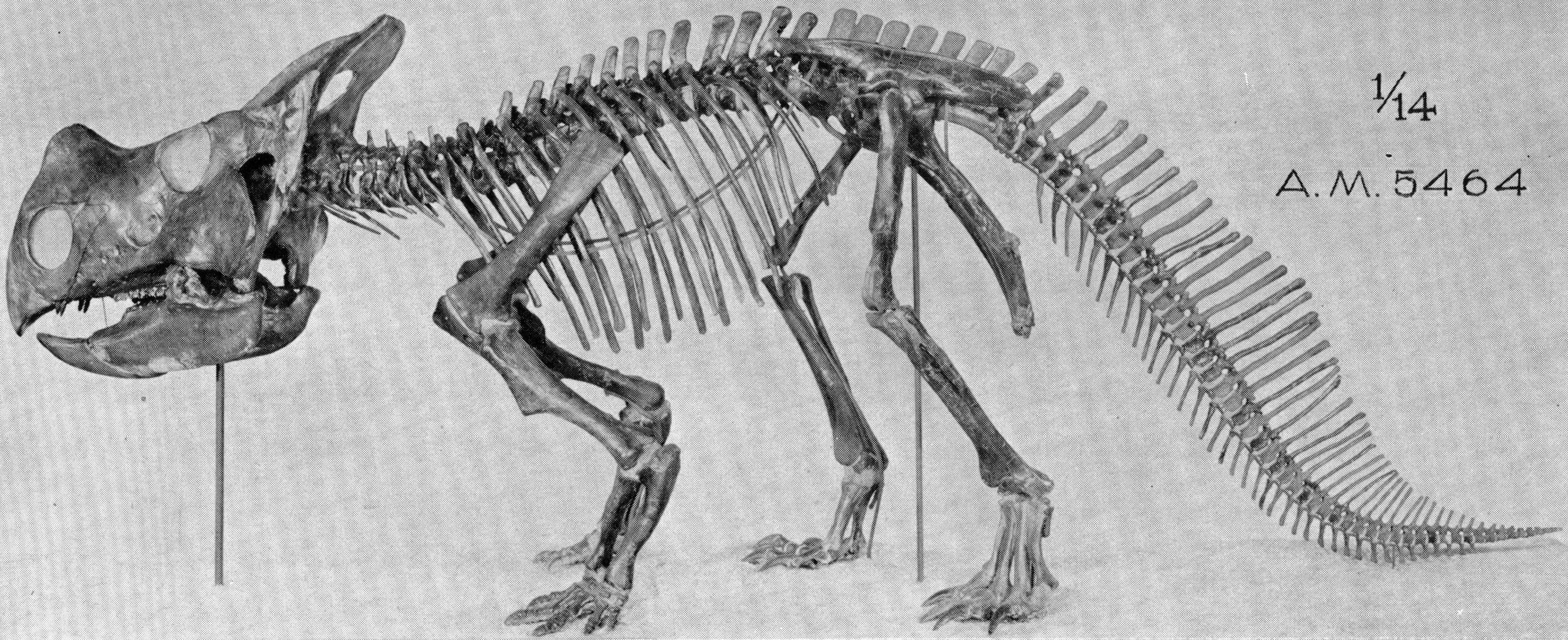
Mounted type skeleton incorrectly restored with nasal horn

The first fossil remains of what we now know as Montanoceratops were discovered on the Blackfeet Indian Reservation, west of Buffalo Lake, Montana in the St. Mary River Formation. It was collected in 1916 by Barnum Brown and Peter C. Kaisen of the American Museum of Natural History from terrestrial sediments that were deposited during the Maastrichtian stages of the Cretaceous period, approximately 70 million years ago. After having mounted a reconstruction in 1935, Brown and his assistant Erich Maren Schlaikjer named it in 1942 as a new species of Leptoceratops: Leptoceratops cerorhynchus, later the type species of Montanoceratops. The genus name Montanoceratops means "Montana horned face", and is derived from the state of Montana, where the holotype specimen was located, and the Greek words "keras" (κερας) meaning "horn", and "ops" (ωψ) meaning "face". The type and only valid species known today is Montanoceratops cerorhynchus.

The original type material discovered by Barnum Brown, designated specimen AMNH 5464, included an incomplete skull and mandible (with most of the skull absent), a complete series of eleven cervical, twelve dorsal and eight sacral vertebrae, thirteen complete caudal vertebrae and the centra of two others, several ribs, a complete pelvic girdle except for the right pubis and the distal part of the right ischium, both femora (346mm), the left tibia (355mm), left fibula and left astragalus, the second phalanx of digit three, and the ungual phalanges of the first, third and fourth digits of the left pes (foot). This specimen is housed in the collection of the American Museum of Natural History in New York City, USA.

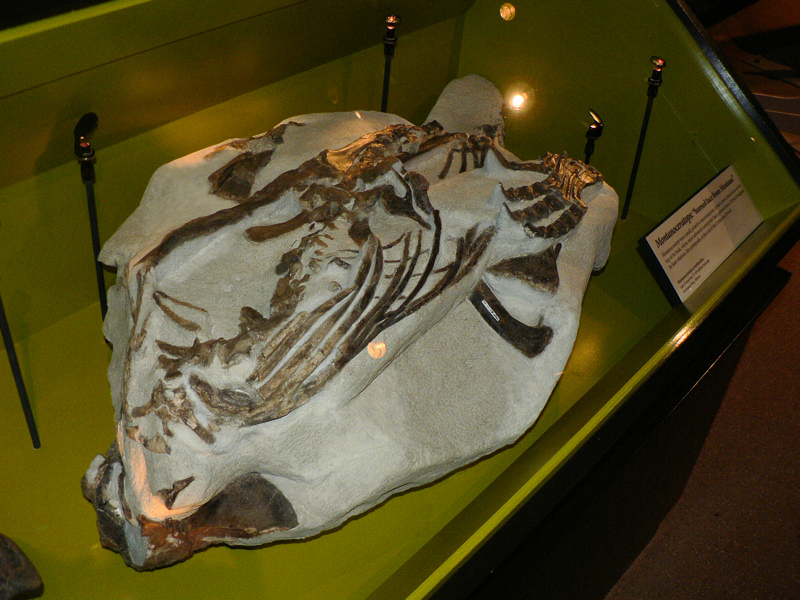
Partial specimen formerly referred to Montanoceratops, RTMP 88.11.1

In 1986, David B. Weishampel discovered more material referable to Montanoceratops in the Little Rocky Coulee locality of the St. Mary River Formation, in Glacier County, Montana. The material, which was found in terrestrial sediments, was also considered Maastrichtian in age. A description of this material was published in a paper by Brenda Chinnery and Weishampel in 1998. In 2001, Peter Makovicky examined and described specimen AMNH 5244, an incomplete but well-preserved braincase that he assigned to Montanoceratops. This specimen was collected by Barnum Brown in 1910, from terrestrial sediments on the east bank of the Red Deer River near Tolman Ferry at the Horseshoe Canyon Formation in Alberta, Canada. This specimen is also housed in the collection of the American Museum of Natural History. An additional specimen from the Crowsnest Pass of Alberta, RTMP 88.11.1, was initially referred to Montanoceratops, but lacks features unique to the type specimen and was instead considered an intermediate leptoceratopsid, possibly Prenoceratops.

== Description ==
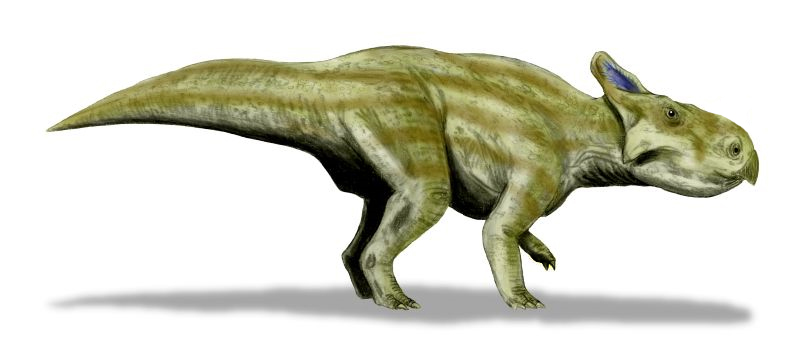
Life restoration

Montanoceratops was a typical primitive ceratopsian in many respects, distinguished from the later species by the presence of claws, rather than hooves, and by having teeth in its upper jaw, rather than a toothless beak. It was once thought to have a horn on its nose, but it was later identified as a misplaced cheek horn.

According to Brown and Schlaikjer (1935), Montanoceratops can be distinguished based on the following characteristics:

- the nasal bone is proportionally large, deep, heavy and with a very well developed horncore
- the dentary is long with a straight ventral margin

== Classification ==
In 1942, Brown assigned the type material AMNH 5464 to the genus Leptoceratops which he concluded was a member of the taxon Protoceratopsidae. In 1951, Charles Mortram Sternberg examined more material belonging to Leptoceratops which showed that AMNH 5464 was a distinct genus, and hence he reassigned it to a new genus Montanoceratops. In 1996, Chinnery and Weishampel conducted a phylogenetic analysis of basal neoceratopsians which showed that Protoceratopsidae was a polyphyletic group and designated Montanoceratops as the most advanced basal neoceratopsian. In 2001, Mackovicky, concluded that Montanoceratops belonged to the taxon Leptoceratopsidae, and defined this group as consisting of Leptoceratops gracilis and all species closer to Leptoceratops than to Triceratops horridus. A study by Ryan et al. (2012) confirmed this assignment.

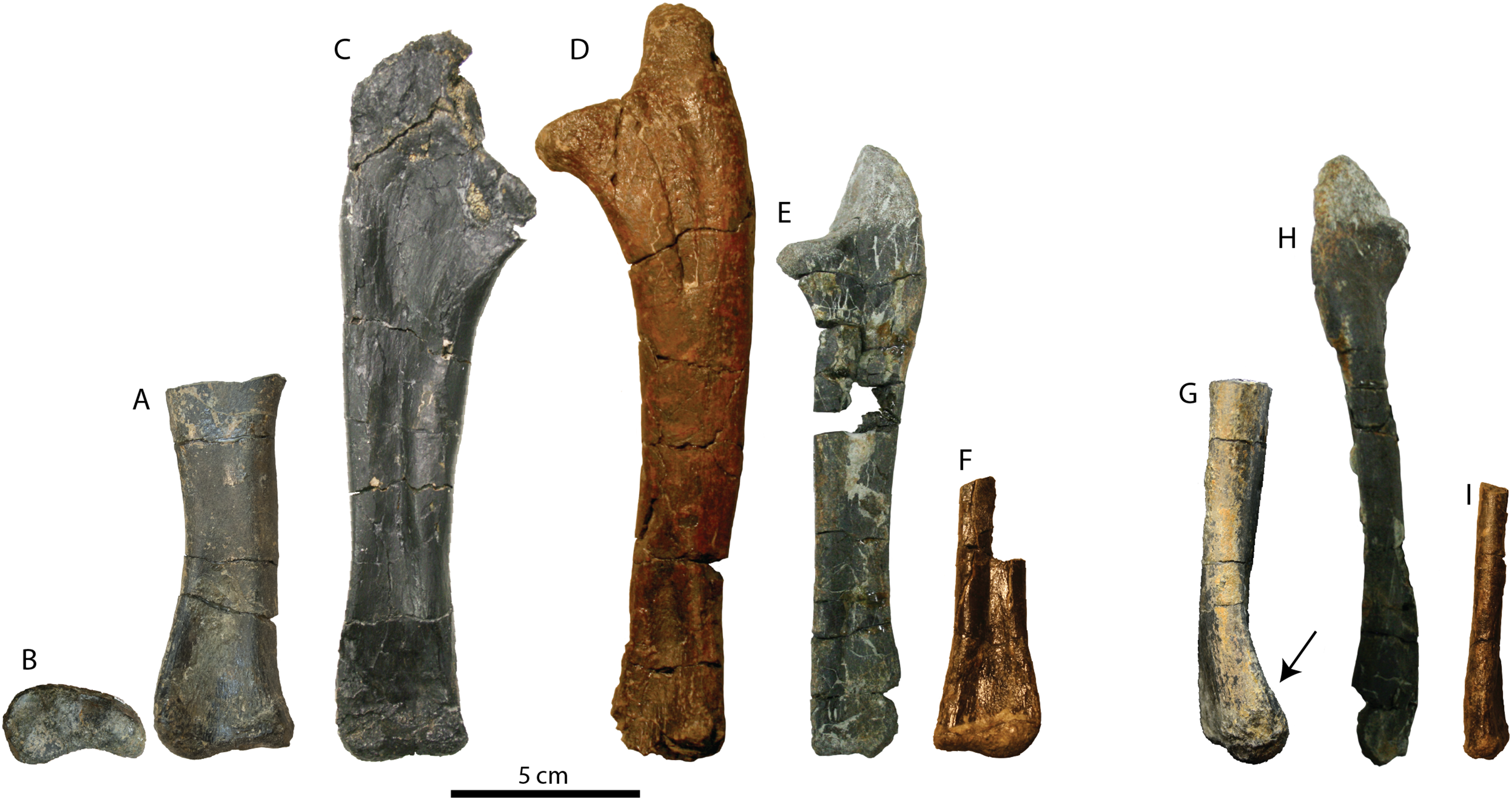
Leptoceratopsid ulnae, including Montanoceratops (F)

The cladogram below represents the results of the phylogenetic analyses performed by He et al. (2015) in their description of Ischioceratops.

- Ceratopsia
  - Yinlong
  - - - Chaoyangsaurus
      - Xuanhuaceratops
    - - Psittacosaurus spp.
      - Neoceratopsia
        - Liaoceratops
        - - Aquilops
          - - Yamaceratops
            - - Auroraceratops
              - - - Archaeoceratops
                  - Helioceratops
                - - Koreaceratops
                  - - Leptoceratopsidae
                      - Asiaceratops
                      - - Cerasinops
                        - - - Ischioceratops
                            - Montanoceratops
                          - - Prenoceratops
                            - - Leptoceratops
                              - - Udanoceratops
                                - - Zhuchengceratops
                                  - - Gryphoceratops
                                    - Unescoceratops
                    - - Coronosauria

== Paleobiology ==
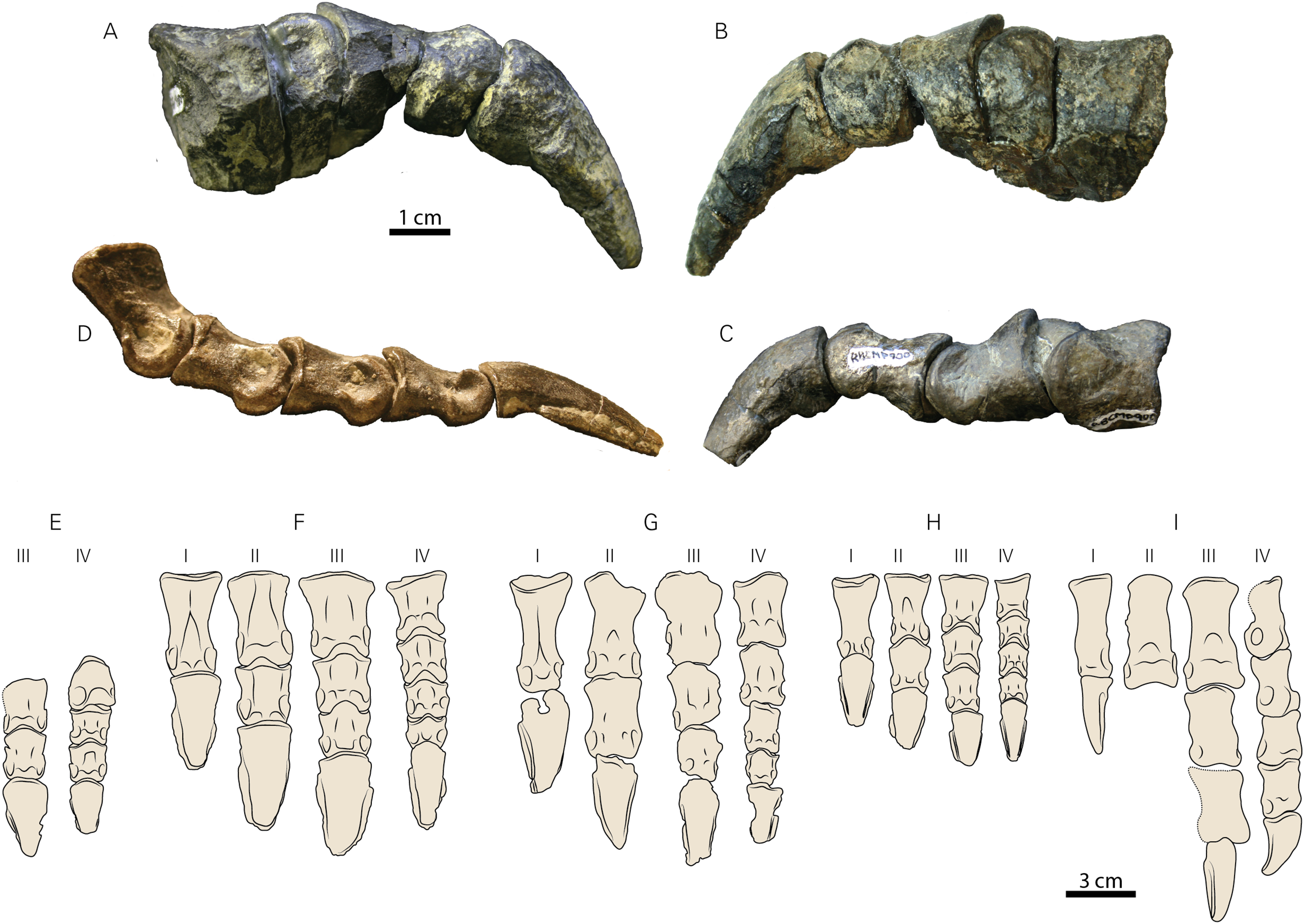
Ornithischian pedal elements, including of Montanoceratops (D)

An unusual feature was the presence of tall spines on the bones of the tail. Although these would not have been visible during life, they would have made the tail unusually deep in cross-section. Since the tail was also highly flexible, it is possible that it was used in intra-species signalling, and that the deep shape made it more visible. Montanoceratops, like all ceratopsians, was a herbivore. It would have used its sharp beak to bite off leaves or needles.

=== Paleopathology ===
In specimen AMNH 5464, the neural spines of several caudal vertebrae show ankylosis resulting from a severe injury sustained by the individual during its lifetime. Evidence of this injury is also present in the outer surface of the left ischium, where there is a large, irregularly shaped growth of bone that has formed across a healed fracture.

== Paleoecology ==
=== Habitat ===
The St. Mary River Formation has not undergone a definitive radiometric dating; however, the available stratigraphic correlation has shown that this formation was laid down between 74 and 66 million years ago during the final regression of the mid-continental Bearpaw Seaway. It ranges from as far south as Glacier County, Montana to as far north as the Little Bow River in Alberta. The St. Mary River Formation is part of the Western Canadian Sedimentary Basin in southwestern Alberta, which extends from the Rocky Mountains in the west to the Canadian Shield in the east. It is laterally equivalent to the Horseshoe Canyon Formation. The region where dinosaurs lived was bounded by mountains to the west, and included ancient channels, small freshwater ponds, streams, and floodplains.

The Horseshoe Canyon Formation has been radiometrically dated as being between 74 and 67 million years old. It was deposited during the gradual withdrawal of the Western Interior Seaway, during the Campanian and Maastrichtian stage of the Late Cretaceous period. The Horseshoe Canyon Formation is a terrestrial unit which is part of the Edmonton Group that includes the Battle Formation and the Whitemud Member, both in Edmonton. The valley where dinosaurs lived included ancient meandering estuary channels, straight channels, peat swamps, river deltas, floodplains, shorelines and wetlands. Due to the changing sea levels, many different environments are represented in the Horseshoe Canyon Formation, including offshore and near-shore marine habitats and coastal habitats like lagoons, and tidal flats. The area was wet and warm with a temperate to subtropical climate. Just prior to the Campanian–Maastrichtian boundary, the mean annual temperature and precipitation in this region dropped rapidly. The dinosaurs from this formation form part of the Edmontonian land vertebrate age, and are distinct from those in the formations above and below.

=== Paleofauna ===
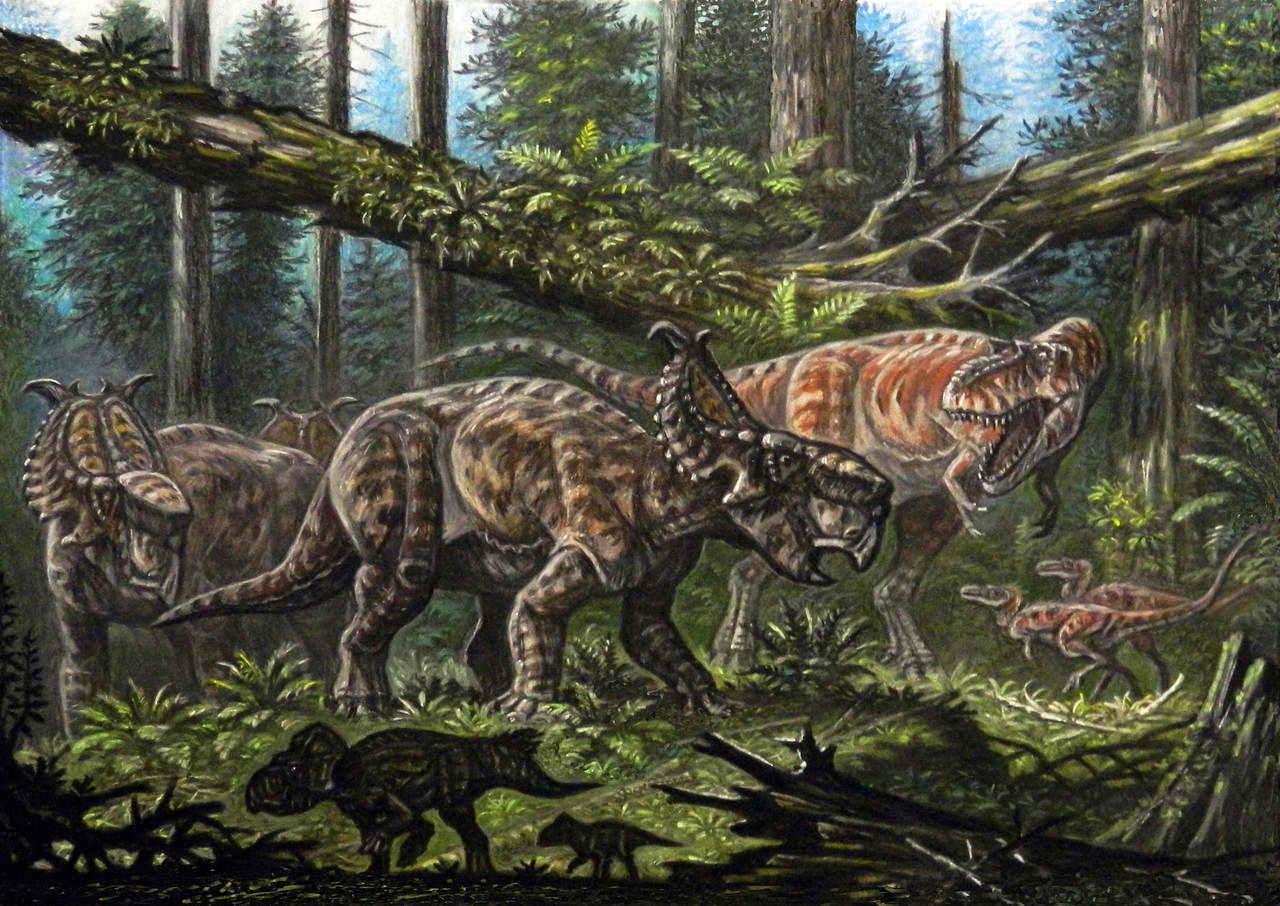
Restoration of Montanoceratops (foreground) escaping a confrontation between Pachyrhinosaurus and Albertosaurus

Montanoceratops shared the paleoenvironment of the St. Mary River Formation with other dinosaurs, such as the ceratopsians Anchiceratops and Pachyrhinosaurus canadensis, the armored nodosaur Edmontonia longiceps, the duckbilled hadrosaur Edmontosaurus regalis, species of the troodontids Saurornitholestes and Troodon, and the tyrannosaurid Albertosaurus, which was likely the apex predator in its ecosystem. Vertebrates present in the St. Mary River Formation at the time of Montanoceratops included the actinopterygian fishes Amia fragosa, Lepisosteus, Belonostomus longirostris, Paralbula casei, and Platacodon nanus, the mosasaur Plioplatecarpus, and the diapsid reptile Champsosaurus. A fair number of mammals lived in this region, which included Turgidodon russelli, Didelphodon, Leptalestes, Cimolodon nitidus, and Paracimexomys propriscus. Non-vertebrates in this ecosystem included mollusks, the oyster Crassostrea wyomingensis, the small clam Anomia, and the snail Melania. Plants found include the aquatic angiosperm Trapago angulata, the amphibious heterosporous fern Hydropteris pinnata, rhizomes, and taxodiaceous conifers.

The paleofauna of the Horseshoe Canyon Formation featured a number of vertebrates that lived at the same time as Montanoceratops. This included dinosaurs such as the ankylosaurid Anodontosaurus lambei, the nodosaurid Edmontonia longiceps, the maniraptorans Atrociraptor marshalli, Epichirostenotes curriei, Richardoestesia gilmorei, Richardoestesia isosceles, the troodontids Paronychodon lacustris and Albertavenator curriei, the alvarezsaurid theropod Albertonykus borealis, the ornithomimids Dromiceiomimus brevitertius, Ornithomimus edmontonicus, and Struthiomimus altus, the pachycephalosaurid Sphaerotholus edmontonensis, the ornithopod Parksosaurus warreni, the hadrosaurids Edmontosaurus regalis, Hypacrosaurus altispinus, and Saurolophus osborni, the ceratopsians Anchiceratops ornatus, Arrhinoceratops brachyops, Eotriceratops xerinsularis, Pachyrhinosaurus canadensis, and the tyrannosaurid Albertosaurus sarcophagus, which was the apex predator of this paleoenvironment. Of these, the hadrosaurs dominated in terms of sheer number and made up half of all dinosaurs who lived in this region. Vertebrates present in the Horseshoe Canyon Formation at the time of Montanoceratops included reptiles, and amphibians. Sharks, rays, sturgeons, bowfins, gars and the gar-like Aspidorhynchus made up the fish fauna. Reptiles such as turtles and crocodilians are rare in the Horseshoe Canyon Formation, and this was thought to reflect the relatively cool climate which prevailed at the time. A study by Quinney et al. (2013) however, showed that the decline in turtle diversity, which was previously attributed to climate, coincided instead with changes in soil drainage conditions, and was limited by aridity, landscape instability, and migratory barriers. The saltwater plesiosaur Leurospondylus was present and freshwater environments were populated by turtles, Champsosaurus, and crocodilians like Leidyosuchus and Stangerochampsa. Evidence has shown that multituberculates and the early marsupial Didelphodon coyi were present. Vertebrate trace fossils from this region included the tracks of theropods, ceratopsians and ornithopods, which provide evidence that these animals were also present. Non-vertebrates in this ecosystem included both marine and terrestrial invertebrates.

== See also ==
- Timeline of ceratopsian research
