= St. Mary River (Alberta–Montana) =

River in Canada and the United States

Saint Mary River
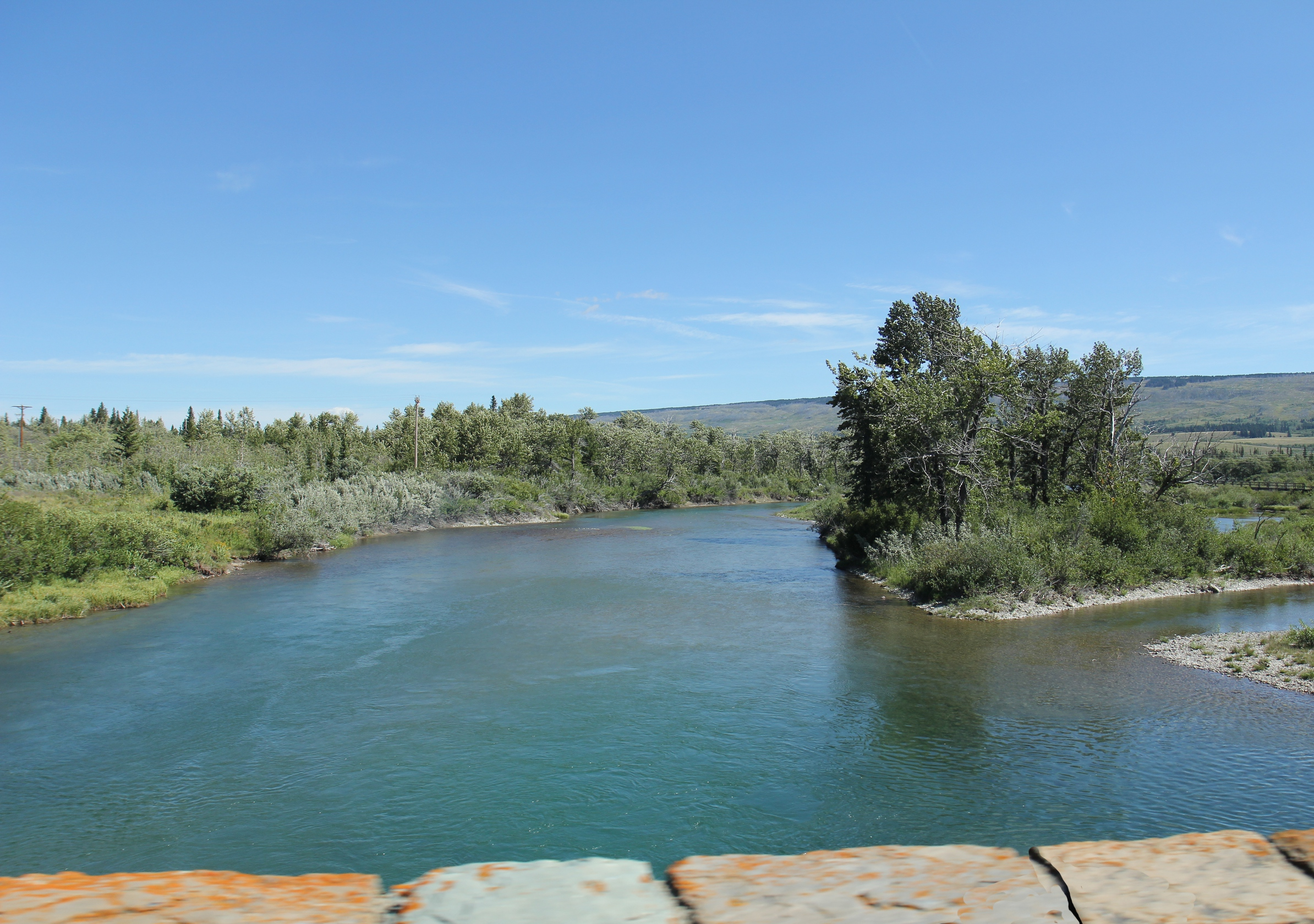
- St. Mary River downstream from Saint Mary Lake

- Location of the mouth in Alberta

Location
- Countries: United States and Canada
- State: Montana
- Province: Alberta

Physical characteristics
- Source: near Gunsight Lake
  - location: Glacier National Park, Lewis Range, Glacier County, Montana, United States
  - coordinates: 48°37′13″N 113°44′37″W
  - elevation: 7,560 ft (2,300 m)
- Mouth: Oldman River
  - location: near Cottonwood Park, Alberta, Canada
  - coordinates: 49°37′38″N 112°53′13″W
  - elevation: 2,739 ft (835 m)

The Saint Mary River (Blackfoot: Apahktóksipisskan), is a cross-border tributary of the Oldman River, itself a tributary of the South Saskatchewan River. The Saint Mary together with the Belly River and Waterton River drains a small portion of Montana, in the United States, to the Hudson Bay watershed in Canada.

The river rises as a stream on Gunsight Mountain in Glacier National Park and flows into Gunsight Lake, then flows into Saint Mary Lake, exits the park and flows on into Lower St. Mary Lake in the Blackfeet Indian Reservation. From the reservation, the St. Mary River flows into Alberta and into the St. Mary Reservoir. It flows into the Oldman River which eventually reaches the Saskatchewan River.

It passes near the town of Cardston, Alberta, and the city of Lethbridge, Alberta.

== Irrigation ==
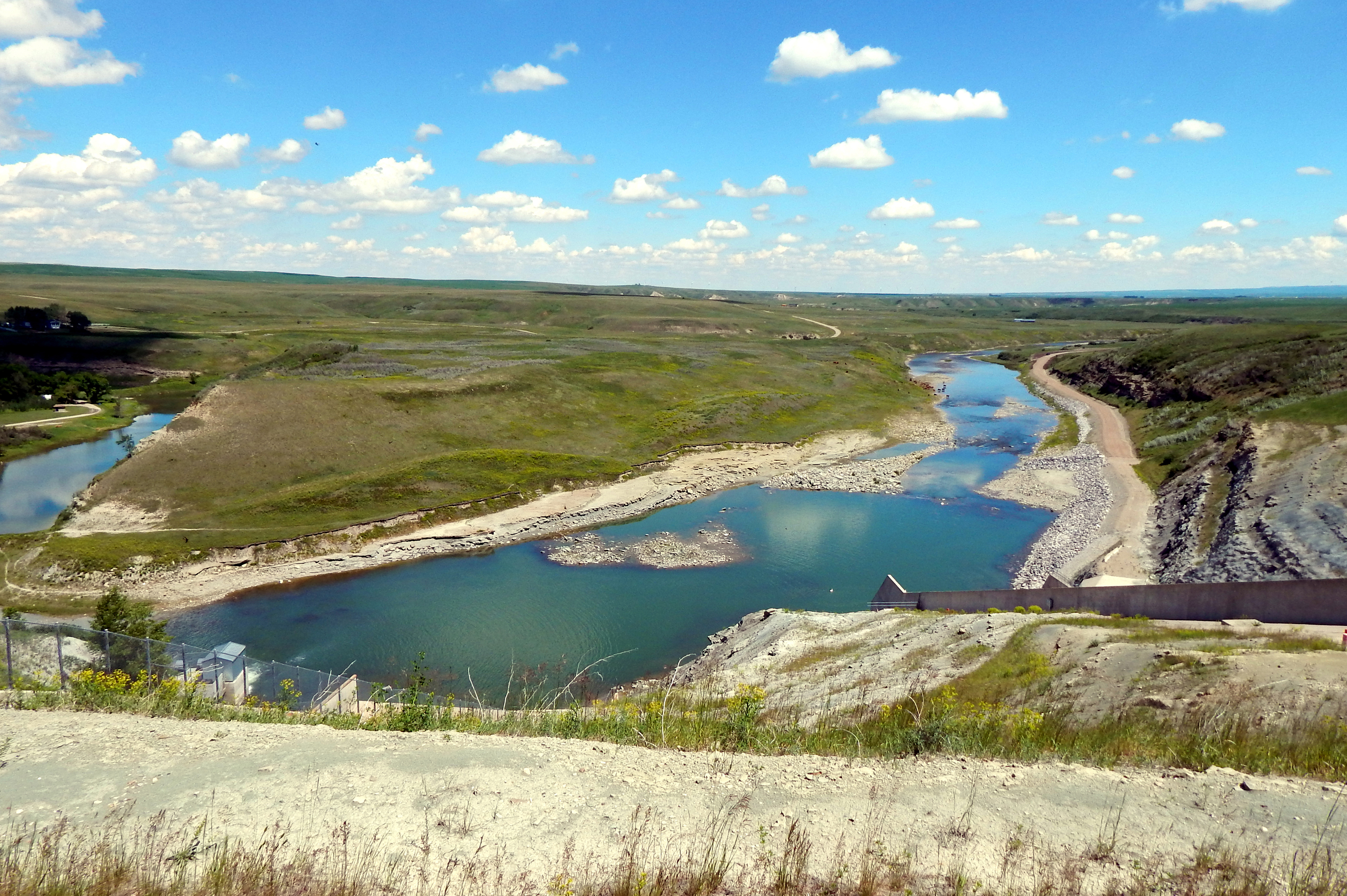
The St. Mary River below St. Mary Reservoir in Alberta

The St. Mary River also provides water for irrigation in Southern Alberta. The St. Mary River Irrigation District (SMRID) is Canada's largest irrigation district delivering water through 2,060 kilometres (1,280 mi) of canals and pipelines to approximately 1,505 square kilometres (372,000 acres) of land south of the Oldman and South Saskatchewan Rivers between Lethbridge and Medicine Hat.

The irrigation project was started in 1898, and on September 4, 1900, the first water was brought to Lethbridge by the project. In December 1945 the Canadian Pacific Railway transferred control of the projects to the government of Alberta, creating the St. Mary and Milk River Development (SMRD). A dam was created in 1946 on the St. Mary River, to service the irrigation system, and water finally reached Medicine Hat in 1954 upon the completion of the St. Mary Main Canal.

The St. Mary Unit diverts water from the St. Mary River over the continental divide to the Milk River for the Milk River Project. The Milk River Project supplies enough water to irrigate 120,000 acres (49,000 ha) of farmland in Montana and the St. Mary River supplies between 60 and 80 percent of the water. On June 17, 2024, the "system suffered a major failure when the St. Mary siphon ruptured". The system was not operational again until the spring of 2026.

== See also ==
- List of rivers of Alberta
- List of rivers of Montana
- Montana Stream Access Law
- St. Mary Reservoir
