= Summit Creek Formation =

Geologic formation in Canada

- Type: Geological formation

Location
- Region: Northwest Territories
- Country: Canada

The Summit Creek Formation is a Mesozoic geologic formation in Canada. Dinosaur remains are among the fossils that have been recovered from the formation, although none have yet been referred to a specific genus (Although a specimen of Pachyrhinosaurus may have come from the formation).

== See also ==
- List of dinosaur-bearing rock formations
  - List of stratigraphic units with indeterminate dinosaur fossils
