= Erich Maren Schlaikjer =

American paleontologist

- Born: November 22, 1905; Newtown, Ohio, United States
- Died: November 5, 1972 (aged 66); Littleton, Colorado, United States
- Education: Harvard University; Columbia University
- Spouse: Josephine Ayres (m. 1951; died 1972)
- Children: 3
- Scientific career
- Thesis: Contributions to the stratigraphy and palaeontology of the Goshen hole area, Wyoming (1933)

Erich Maren Schlaikjer (/ˈɛrɪk ˈmærən ˈʃlaɪkjər/ ERR-ik MARR-ən SHLY-kyər; November 22, 1905 – November 5, 1972) was an American geologist and dinosaur hunter. Assisting Barnum Brown, he co-described Pachycephalosaurus and what is now Montanoceratops. Other discoveries include Miotapirus and a new species of Mesohippus.

Schlaikjer attended Harvard University, where he graduated with a bachelor's degree in 1929. He received master’s and doctoral degrees from Columbia University in 1931 and in 1935, respectively. On November 5, 1972, he died in Littleton, Colorado.

== Honors ==
Selected highlights of honors:

- Parmentier Scholar, Harvard University 1924 to 1925.
- University Fellow, Columbia University, 1931 to 1932.
- Cressy Morrison Prize, New York Academy of Science, 1939.
- Fellow of The Geological Society of America, 1939.
- Fellow of the Paleontological Society of America, 1940.
- Fellow of the American Association for the Advancement of Science.
- Who’s Who in America, 1949 Supplement, 1950 edition to date.

== Publications ==
- Schlaikjer EM. (1931) Description of a new Mesohippus from the White River formation of South Dakota: New England Zool. Club Proc., 12, pp35–36.
- Schlaikjer EM. (1932) The osteology of Mesohippus barbouri: Mus. Comp. Zool. Bull., 72, pp391–410.
- Brown B, Schlaikjer EM. (1937) The skeleton of Styracosaurus with the description of a new species: Am. Mus. Novitates. 955 p1-12.
