= Fusillade Mountain =

Mountain in Montana, United States

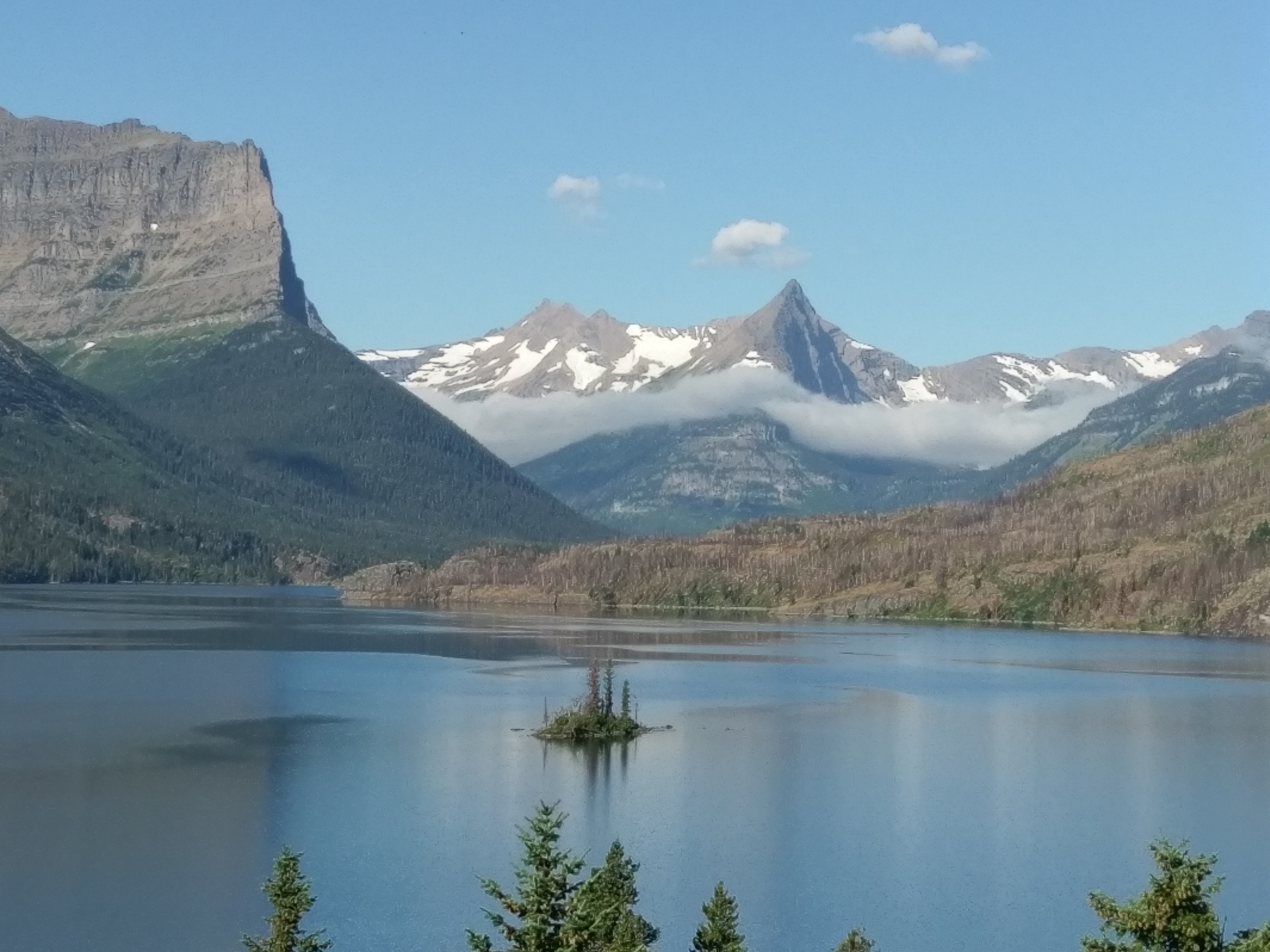
- Fusillade Mountain with fog below summit

Highest point
- Elevation: 8,755 ft (2,669 m)
- Prominence: 679 ft (207 m)
- Coordinates: 48°38′25″N 113°43′21″W

Geography
- Location within Montana Location within the United States
- Location: Glacier County, Montana, U.S.
- Parent range: Lewis Range
- Topo map(s): USGS Logan Pass, MT

Fusillade Mountain (8,755 feet (2,669 m)) is located in the Lewis Range, Glacier National Park in the U.S. state of Montana. Fusillade Mountain lies immediately north of Gunsight Lake at the western terminus of the St. Mary Valley and can be seen from the Going-to-the-Sun Road. The mountain was named by George Bird Grinnell in 1891, "as a satirical gesture at W. H. Seward and Henry L. Stimson for firing a futile volley at a group of goats on the side of this mountain".

== Geology ==
Like the mountains in Glacier National Park, Fusillade is composed of sedimentary rock laid down during the Precambrian to Jurassic periods. Formed in shallow seas, this sedimentary rock was initially uplifted beginning 170 million years ago when the Lewis Overthrust fault pushed an enormous slab of precambrian rocks 3 mi (4.8 km) thick, 50 miles (80 km) wide and 160 miles (260 km) long over younger rock of the cretaceous period.

== Climate ==
Based on the Köppen climate classification, it is located in an alpine subarctic climate zone characterized by long, usually very cold winters, and short, cool to mild summers. Temperatures can drop below −10 °F with wind chill factors below −30 °F.

== Gallery ==
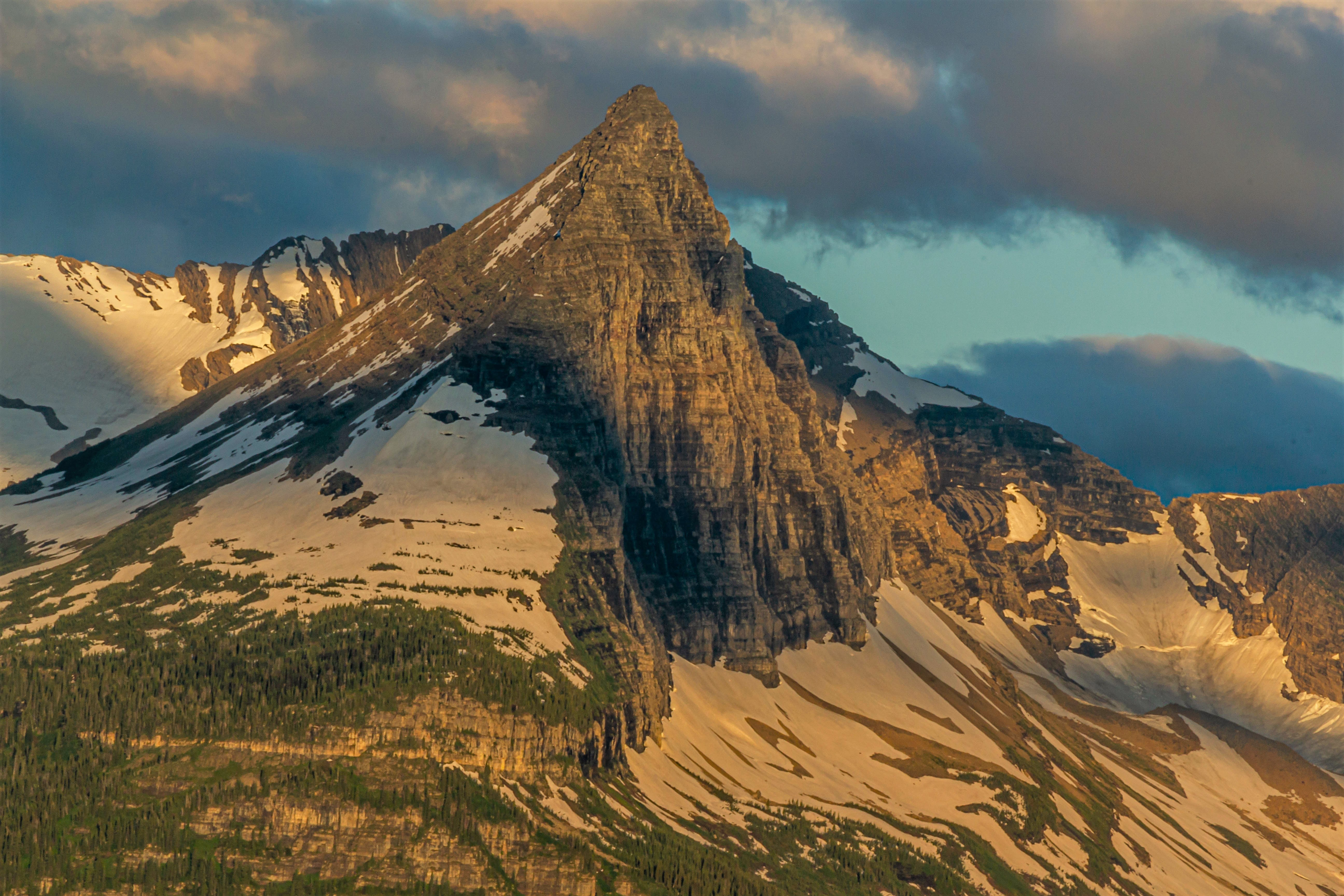
Fusillade Mountain

SSW aspect of Fusillade Mountain

== See also ==
- Mountains and mountain ranges of Glacier National Park (U.S.)
