= St. Mary Reservoir =

Reservoir in Alberta, Canada

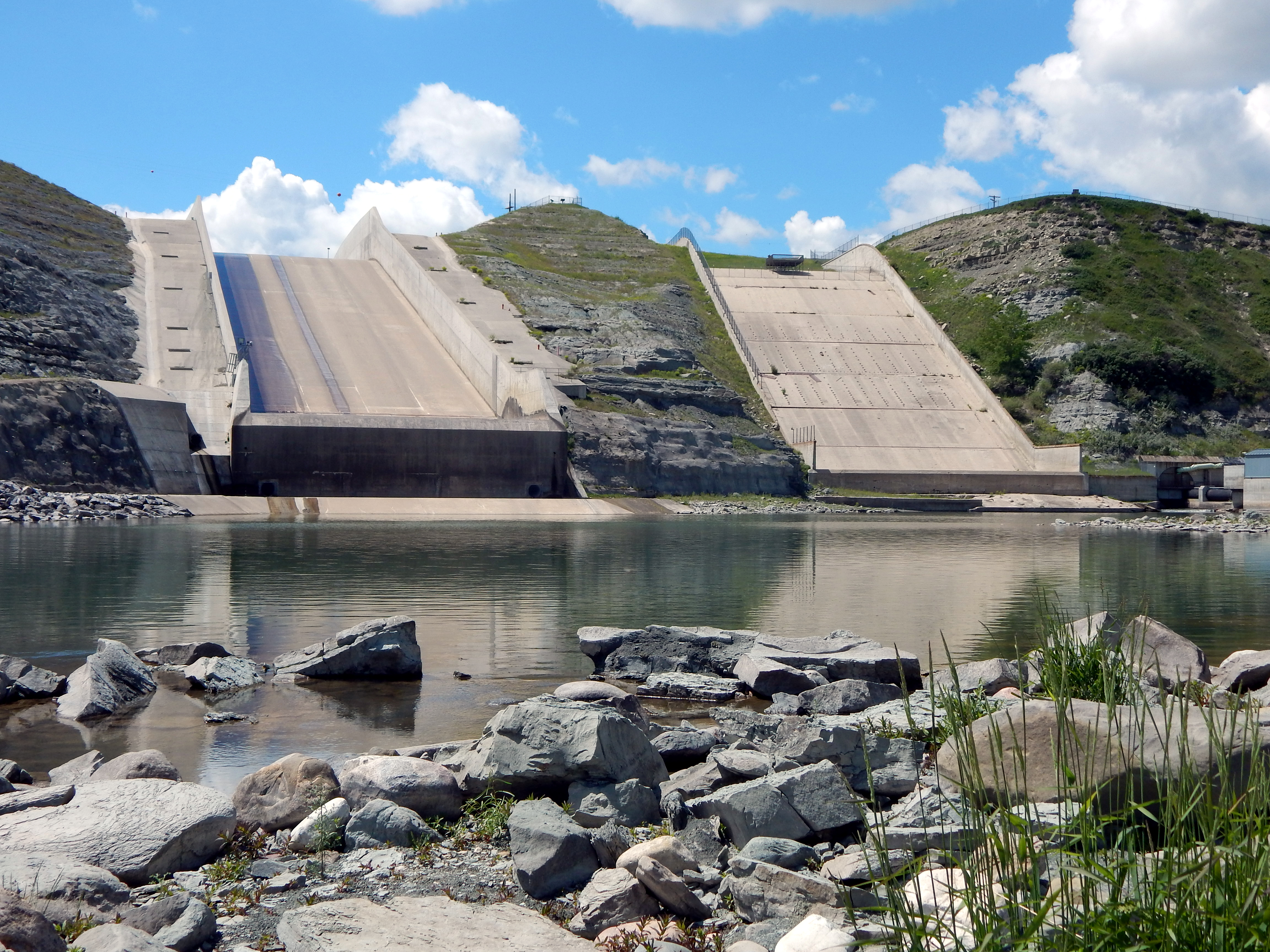
- The disused (right) and replacement (left) spillways of St. Mary Reservoir

- Location within Alberta
- Location: Cardston County, Alberta
- Coordinates: 49°19′15″N 113°12′42″W
- Basin countries: Canada
- Max. length: 7.9 km (4.9 mi)
- Max. width: 9.9 km (6.2 mi)
- Surface area: 37.5 km^{2} (14.5 sq mi)
- Average depth: 10.4 m (34 ft)
- Max. depth: 56.4 m (185 ft)
- Surface elevation: 1,100 m (3,600 ft)
- References: St. Mary Reservoir

St. Mary Reservoir is a reservoir in southwestern Alberta, Canada. It was created for irrigation purposes by the damming of the St. Mary River, which was completed in 1951. The Kainai Nation's Blood 148 Indian reserve borders its northwest side. There are camping and picnic areas at the reservoir, and it is a popular site for power boating, water skiing, windsurfing, swimming and fishing.

== Wally's Beach ==
The Wally's Beach site (DhPg-8) at the reservoir is an important site for late Pleistocene to early Holocene paleontology and archaeology. It was found when the reservoir was partially drained for the construction of a new spillway in 1998. The original flooding of the reservoir had killed the vegetation and when the water level dropped, wind erosion removed layers of unprotected sand and silt, exposing trackways and bones of extinct mammals, as well as stone tools used by Paleoindian hunters. The Wally's Beach site became submerged again when the reservoir was refilled several years later and is only exposed at times of very low water levels. Bones and artifacts from the site are housed at the Royal Alberta Museum.

=== Age ===
Based on radiocarbon dating of faunal remains, the assemblage preserved at St. Mary Reservoir was dated at about 11,000 years ago (11 to 11.35 kiloanna (ka) before present (B.P.)). This placed it in latest Pleistocene to earliest Holocene time. Re-examined in 2015, the dating for the camel, horse, and muskox bones subsequently changed this figure to 13.1 - 13.3 ka B.P.

=== Paleoenvironment ===
Eleven thousand years ago the Laurentide Ice Sheet had recently retreated from the area and the site was a windswept, semi-arid plain covered with grasses and low shrubby vegetation, similar to the mammoth steppes of Europe and Asia. The rich open grassland and the reliable supply of water at the river supported herds of large, late Pleistocene mammals and other animals.

=== Paleontology ===
The fossil assemblage includes skeletal remains of the extinct musk ox Bootherium bombifrons, the extinct bison Bison antiquus, the extant caribou Rangifer tarandus, Equus ferus, the extant badger Taxidea taxus, and other mustelids, as well as canids and ground squirrels. The equiid remains were originally identified as belonging to the extinct non-caballine horse Equus conversidens; later morphological and mtDNA analysis revealed that the remains actually belonged to Equus ferus.

Footprints and trackways preserved in silt include those of mammoths and the extinct camel Camelops hesternus, in addition to those of horse, bison and caribou. Some of the trackways show evidence of browsing, herding, and social interaction.

In a study published in 2005, measurement of footprints from recorded mammoth trackways showed that only 30% of the animals were juveniles. Healthy herds of African elephants include 50% to 70% young animals, while lower numbers are seen in connection with stresses from poaching. The study is quoting the original radiocarbon date for the footprints at 11,000 to 11,300 years B.P., but both the original and re-examined date place the footprints in the period of human spread across North America, suggesting a correlation between human presence and local decline in herd viability.

=== Archaeology ===
The herds of animals and the reliable supply of water attracted Paleoindian hunters, and the artifacts recovered from the site suggest that it was a hunting locality. Most of the material consists of stone flakes and flake fragments. A stone chopper, a biface fragment and a few flake tools have been found associated with remains of horse and musk ox. There are also Clovis points with preserved residue of horse and bison protein.
