= Gunsight Lake =

Lake in the United States of America

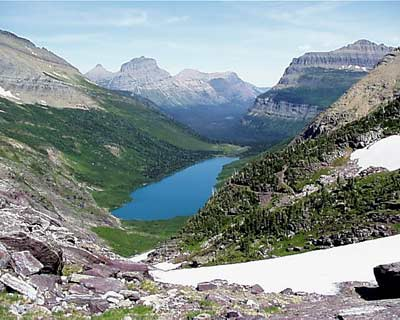
- Gunsight Lake with Going-to-the-Sun Mountain in the distance, left background and Fusillade Mountain at left.

- Location within Montana Location within the United States
- Location: Glacier National Park, Glacier County, Montana, US
- Coordinates: 48°37′24″N 113°43′12″W
- Lake type: Natural
- Primary inflows: St. Mary River
- Primary outflows: St. Mary River
- Basin countries: United States
- Max. length: .80 miles (1.29 km)
- Max. width: .25 miles (0.40 km)
- Surface elevation: 5,351 ft (1,631 m)

Gunsight Lake is located in Glacier National Park, in the U.S. state of Montana. The lake is surrounded by high peaks including Fusillade Mountain to the north and Gunsight Mountain to the west. Mount Jackson rises more than 4,700 feet (1,400 m) above Gunsight Lake to the south.

Toward Gunsight Pass

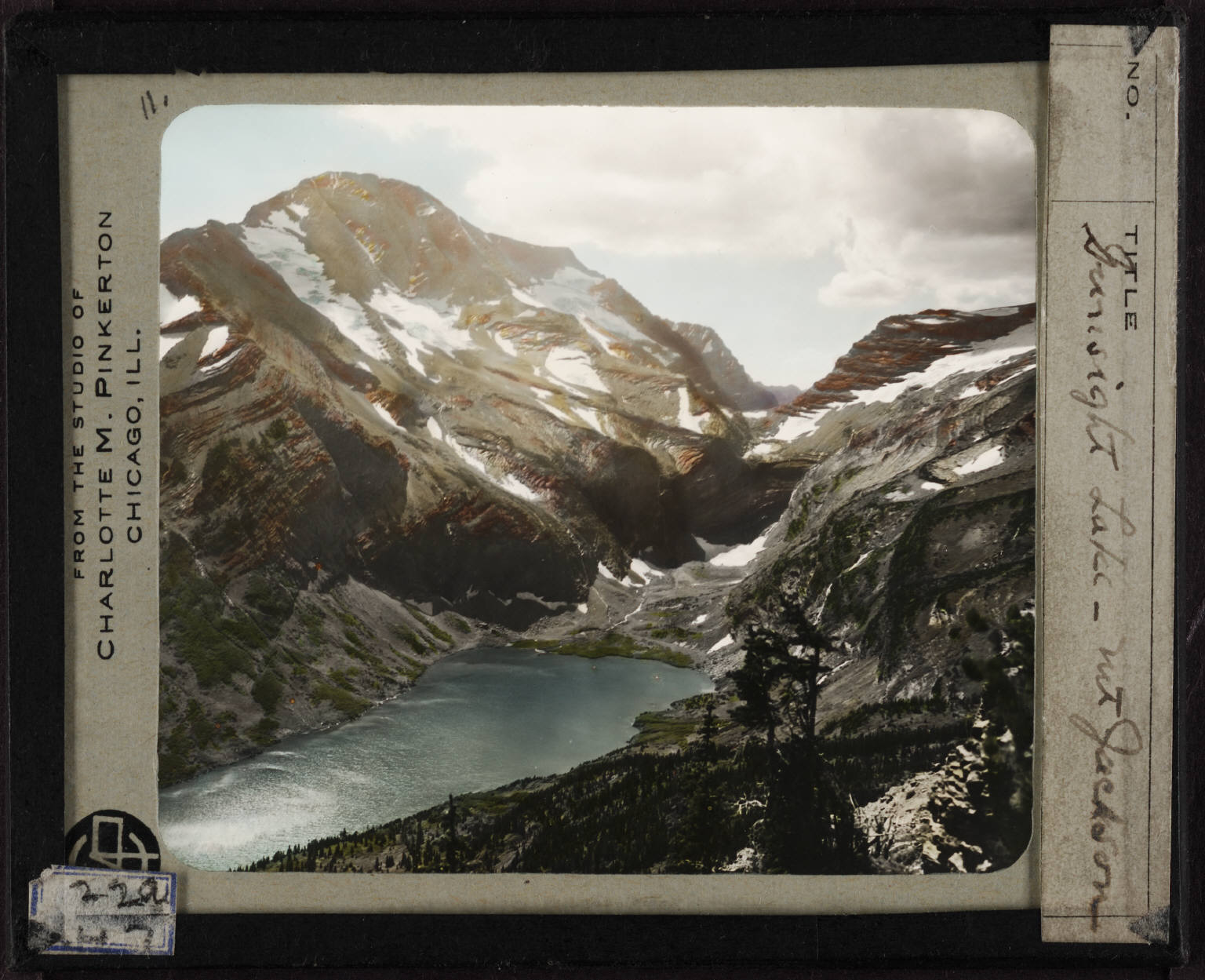
Lantern Slide image of Gunsight Lake with Mount Jackson in background

== See also ==
- List of lakes in Glacier County, Montana
