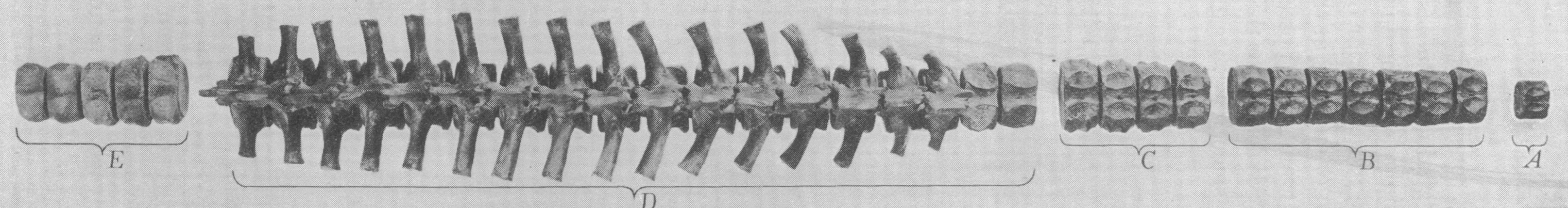
- Dorsal view of the holotype spine of L. ultimus

Scientific classification
- Kingdom: Animalia
- Phylum: Chordata
- Class: Reptilia
- Order: †Plesiosauria
- Suborder: †Plesiosauroidea
- Family: †Elasmosauridae?
- Genus: †Leurospondylus Brown, 1913

Binomial name
- †Leurospondylus ultimus Brown, 1913

= Leurospondylus =

Leurospondylus Temporal range: Late Cretaceous, ~74–67 Ma

Genus of reptiles

Leurospondylus is an extinct genus of plesiosaur from the Horseshoe Canyon Formation of Canada whose family is currently disputed, but is suggested to be Elasmosauridae.

== Etymology ==
The name Leurospondylus comes from a fusion of two Greek words, leuros (λευρός) meaning "even", "flat" or "smooth", and spondylos (σπόνδυλος) meaning "vertebra." The specific name of the type species L. ultimus comes from the Latin ultimus meaning "last." It was so named because this genus was the latest known occurrence of a fossil plesiosaur when it was described in 1913."

== Description ==
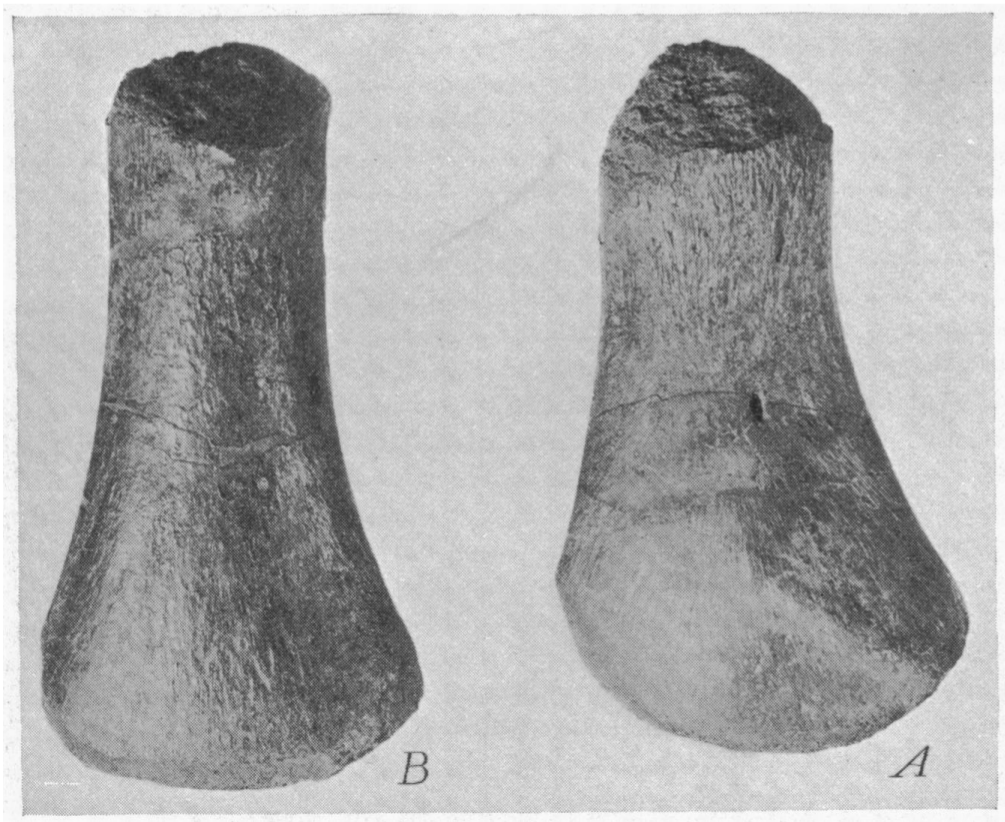
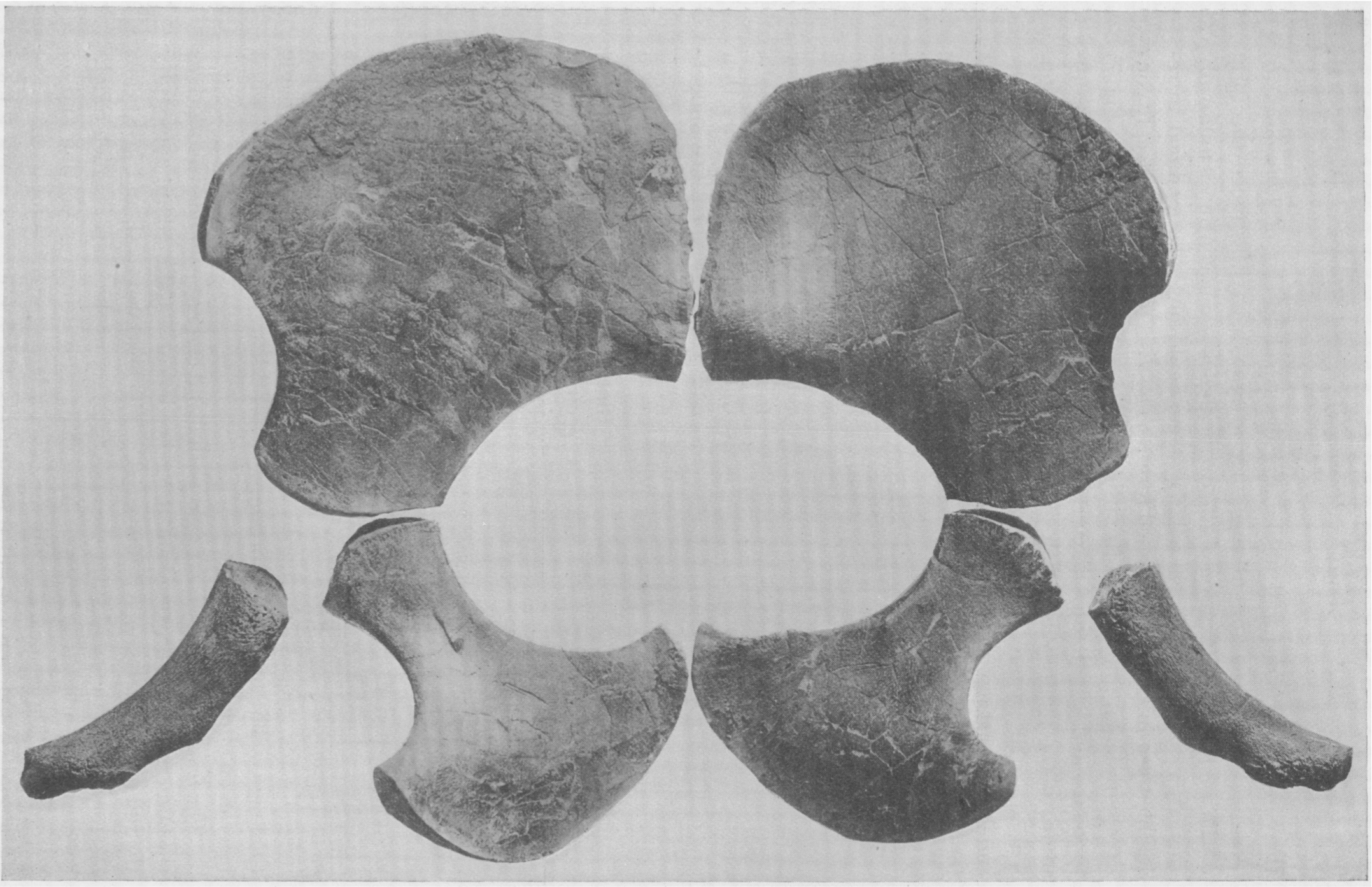
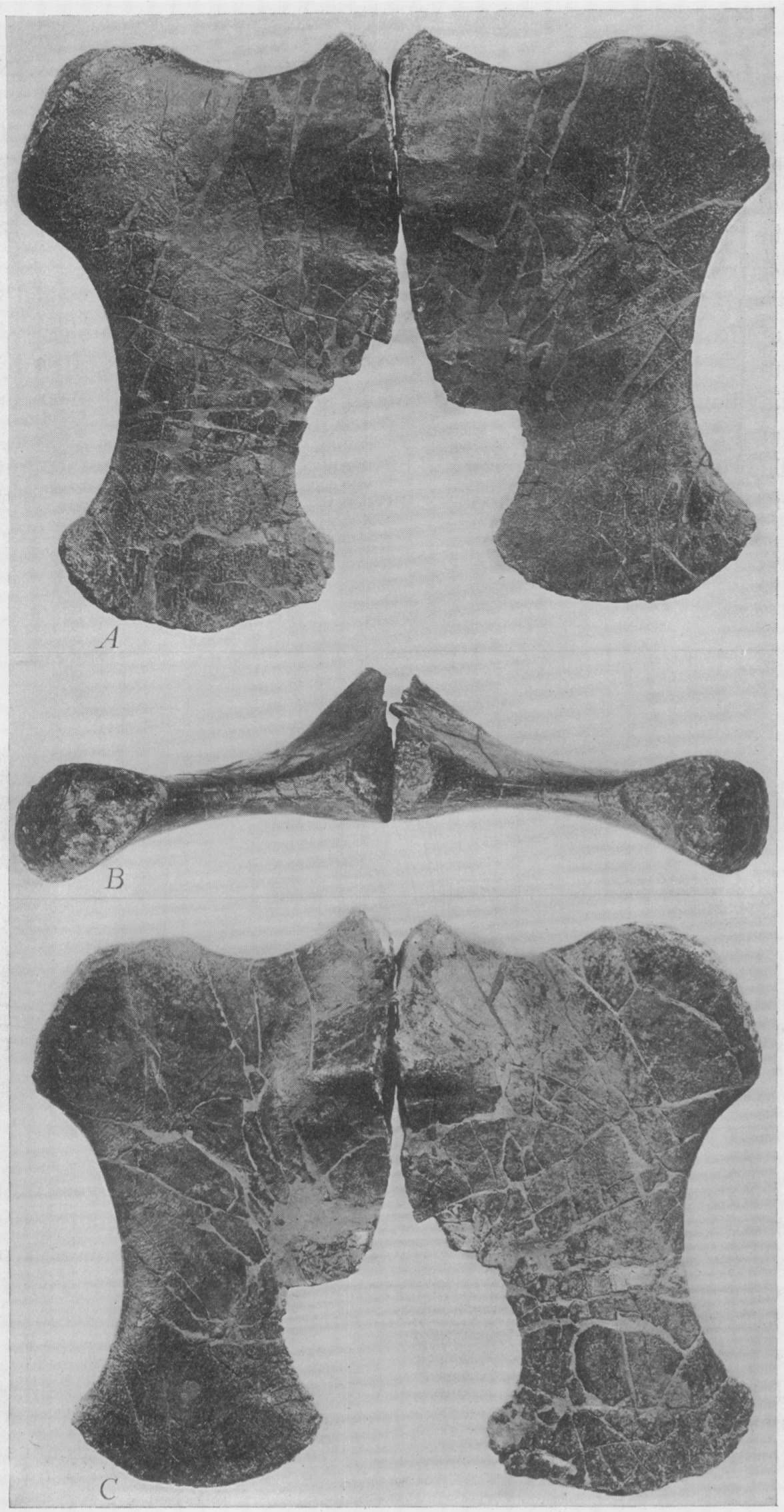
Humeri (left), pelvis (middle), and coracoids (right) from the holotype

The holotype of L. ultimus was a juvenile. The fossil included 12 vertebrae but the animal is thought to have had twice that number, and was estimated to be roughly 2 meters long as a juvenile. Samuel Paul Welles noted that the vertebrae are short and similar to those of pliosaurs, while the scapulae and coracoids bear resemblance to those of elasmosaurids, thus making it difficult to determine to which family it belongs. There is some speculation that the Leurospondylus specimen is either a juvenile of a known species, or in its own, unrecognized taxonomic group.

== Distribution ==
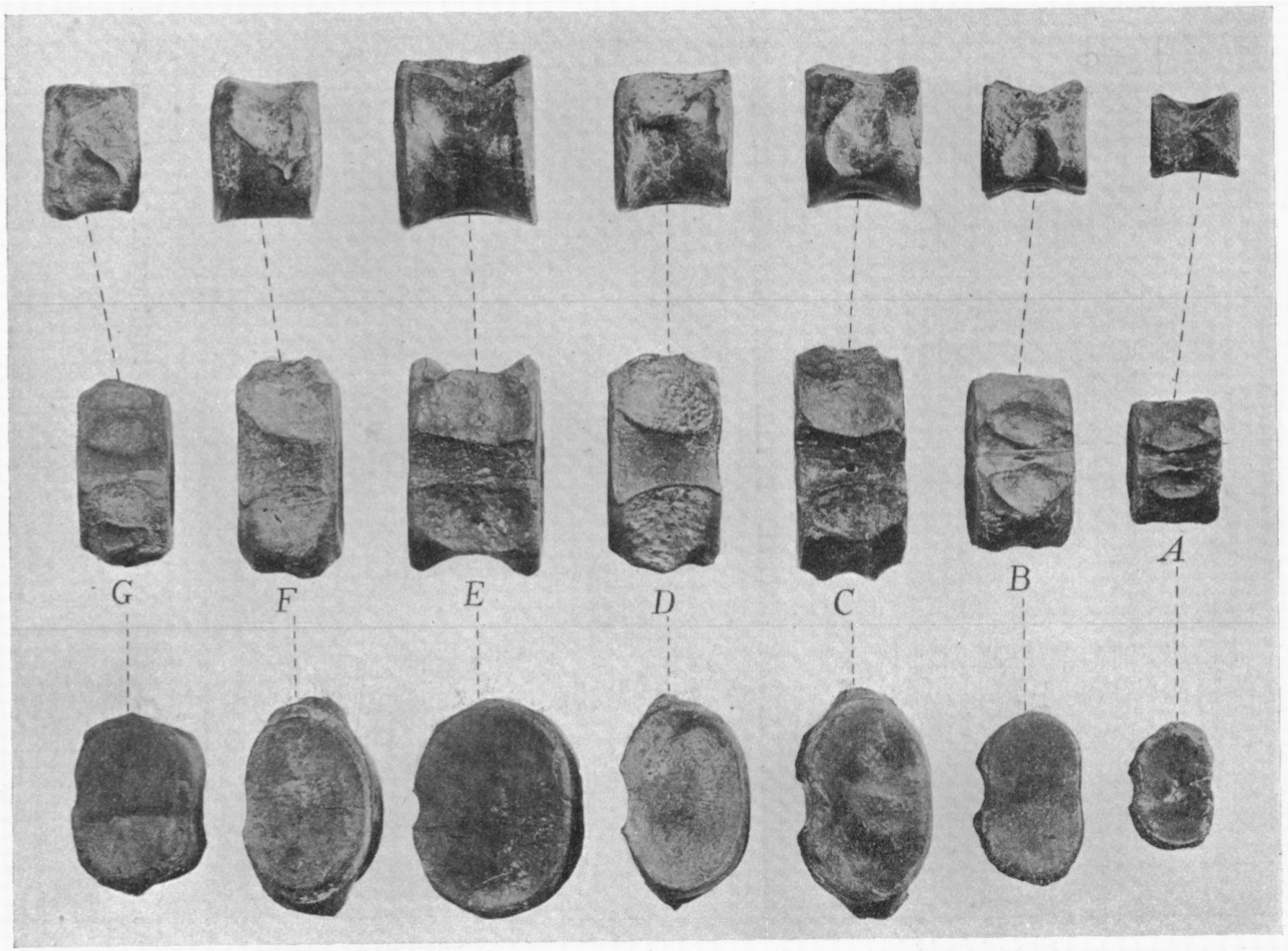
The individual vertebrae of the holotype

The holotype was found in the brackish paleoenvironment represented by the Edmonton beds located on the present-day Red Deer River. This area is part of the Horseshoe Canyon Formation in Alberta, Canada. The occurrence of this juvenile fossil in an identifiably brackish environment led to the conclusion that plesiosaurs spent their early lives in rivers and estuaries. However, some plesiosaurs spent their adult lives in fresh water also; whether Leurospondylus grew up and then left, or grew up and stayed in a fresh water ecosystem has not been determined.

== See also ==
- List of plesiosaur genera
- Timeline of plesiosaur research
