= T.rex Discovery Centre =

Museum in Eastend, Saskatchewan, Canada

Coordinates: 49.5224°N 108.8272°W

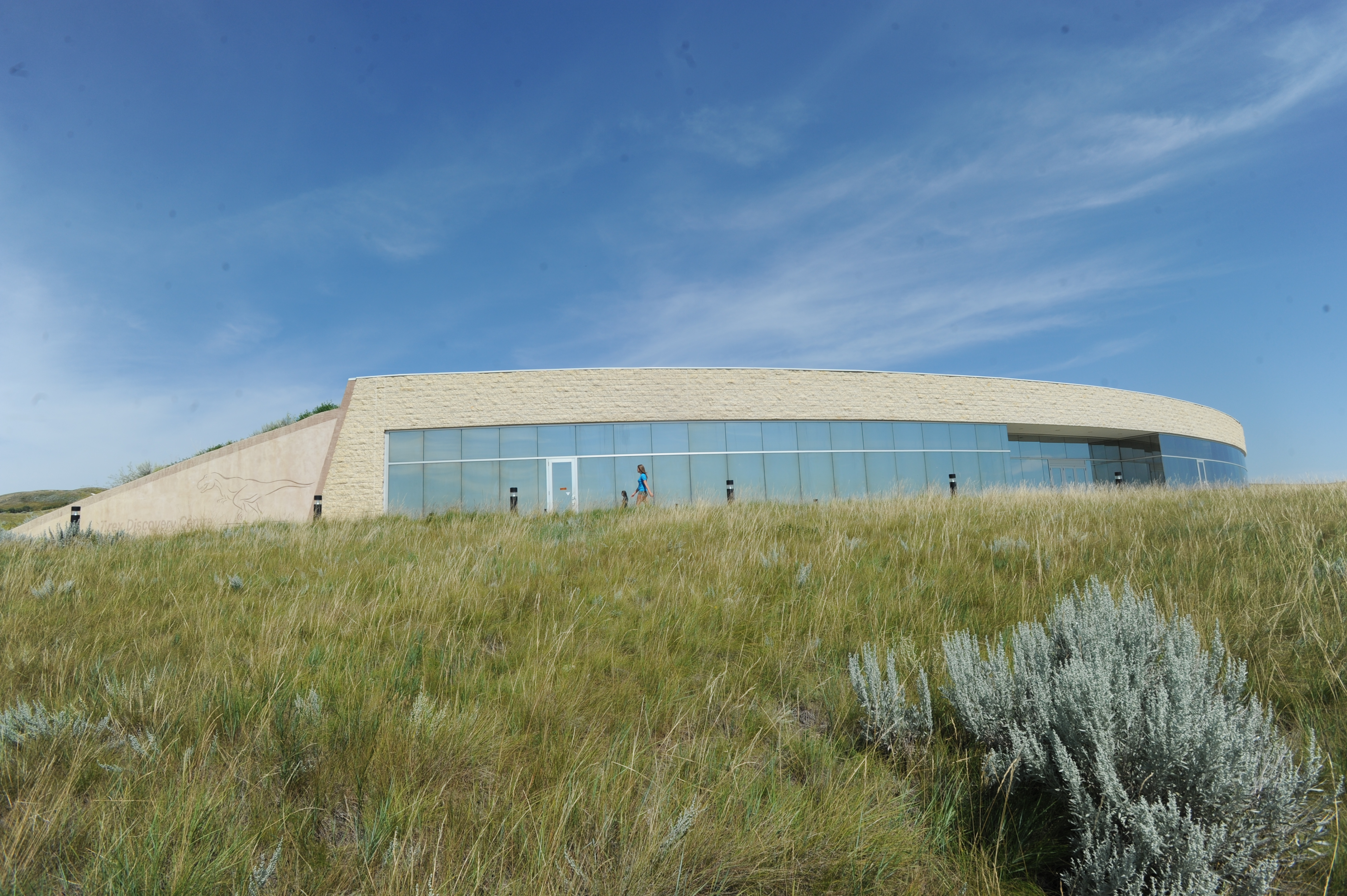

- Location within Saskatchewan
- Established: 2001
- Location: 1 T-Rex Drive Eastend, Saskatchewan, Canada
- Type: Natural history
- Visitors: 10,000
- Owner: Government of Saskatchewan
- Website: royalsaskmuseum.ca/trex

The T.rex Discovery Centre is a natural history museum located in Eastend, Saskatchewan, Canada, and housed in a building designed by Stantec. The T.rex Discovery Centre was opened to the public in 2001, and was intended to house a number of fossils, including the remains of a Tyrannosaurus nicknamed "Scotty" which was found nearby in 1991. Management of the T.rex Discovery Centre was assumed by the Royal Saskatchewan Museum in 2013.

== History ==
The idea for a world-class facility to house the fossil record of southwest Saskatchewan began in 1988. Through a series of public meetings, the Town of Eastend, Saskatchewan identified a need for a palaeontological centre to showcase the rich fossil record of the Frenchman River Valley and the Cypress Hills. The T.rex Discovery Centre opened in 2001 in the Frenchman River Valley, about 25 km southeast of Eastend. On February 14, 2013 the Royal Saskatchewan Museum assumed operations of the T.rex Discovery Centre.

== Galleries ==
=== Cretaceous Gallery ===
This gallery explores the geologic sediments deposited to create the Bearpaw Formation and the Frenchman Formation and the fossils within. This includes invertebrates from the Bearpaw Formation such as ammonite and baculite, fish, shark, turtles and marine reptiles and fossils from the Frenchman Formation including Tyrannosaurus rex, Triceratops and Hadrosaurus.

=== Cenozoic Gallery ===
Some species of mammals, birds and fish survived the K-Pg extinction event. The Ravenscrag Formation is where these fossils were deposited and the gallery examines these creatures from Saskatchewan's prehistoric landscape. On display are reptiles such Borealosuchus and Champsosaurus as well as a life-size cast of the mammal Brontothere.

=== Fossil Research Station ===
Museum palaeontologists work year-round in the station to conduct research on fossils collected over the summer field season.

== Scotty the T. rex ==
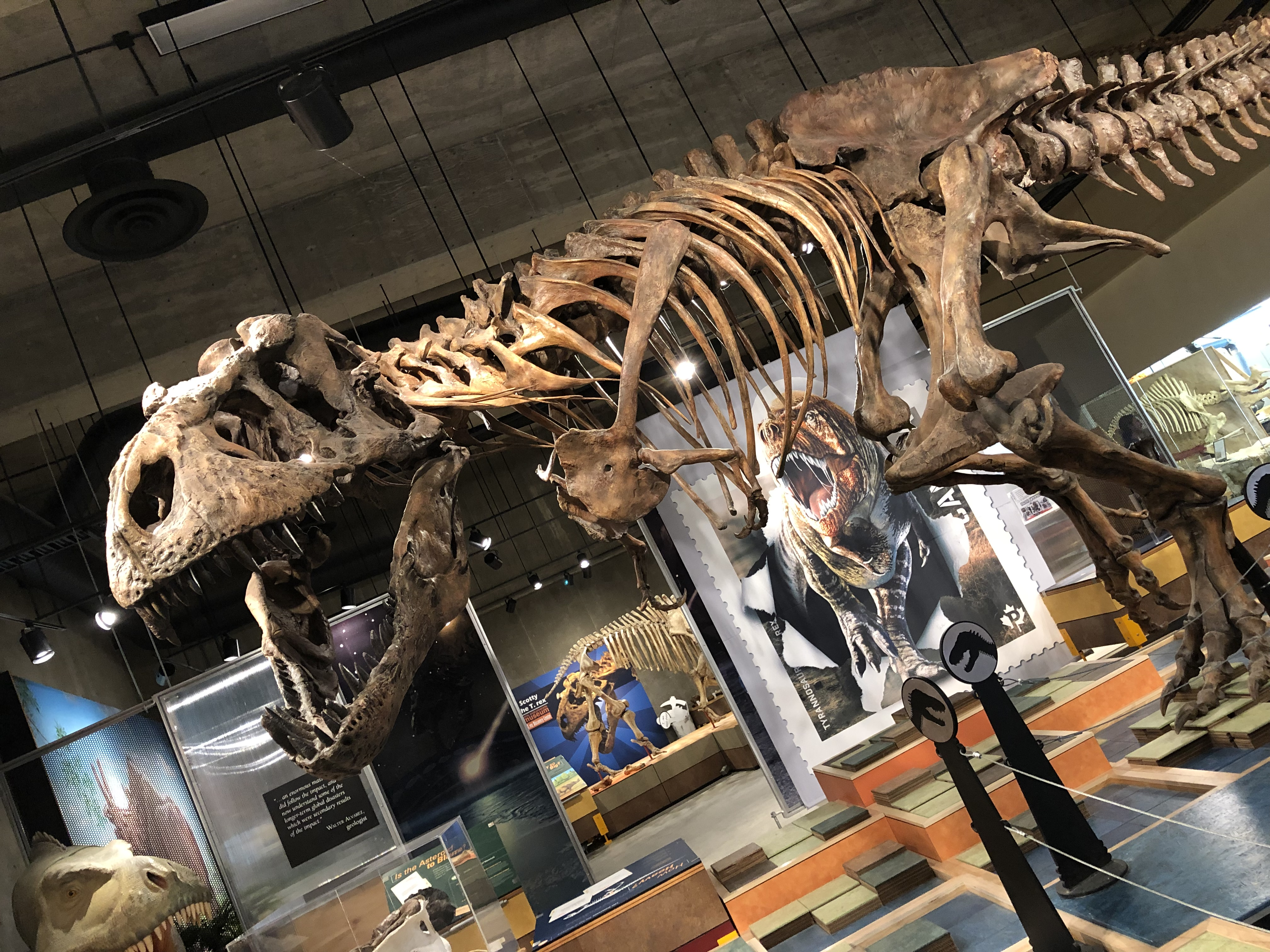
Life-size cast of Scotty the T.rex Discovery Centre in Eastend, SK.

Originally discovered by Royal Saskatchewan Museum research team in Saskatchewan's Frenchman River Valley on August 16, 1991, the fossilized remains of specimen [RSM P2523.8], nicknamed Scotty, were painstakingly removed – almost completely by hand – over two decades from the rock in which they were embedded. When the preparation was complete in 2011, a 65% complete Tyrannosaurus rex skeleton was revealed.

"Scotty" the T. rex was found on August 16, 1991, by local high school principal Robert Gebhardt. Gebhardt had joined palaeontologists Tim Tokaryk and John Storer from the Royal Saskatchewan Museum (RSM) on a prospecting expedition alongside the Frenchman River Valley. Gebhardt stumbled across a tail vertebra of the T. rex on a cattle trail he was walking along. They later found a piece of the jaw with teeth still attached sticking out of the side of a hill. Today, about 65% of Scotty's bones have been recovered.

A cast of Scotty was first to go on display at the T.rex Discovery Centre on March 15, 2013, followed by a second in an exhibit developed by the Australian Museum in November 2013.

On March 21, 2019, Scotty was described to be the largest and oldest T. rex in the world, with an estimated weight of 8870 kg, length of 13.2 m and age of over 30 years. The previous owner of the 'longest lived T. rex' title was Sue, who lived to be 28.

On May 17, 2019, a cast of Scotty was unveiled at the Royal Saskatchewan Museum.
