= Ravenscrag, Saskatchewan =

Community in Saskatchewan, Canada

Ravenscrag
- Unincorporated community
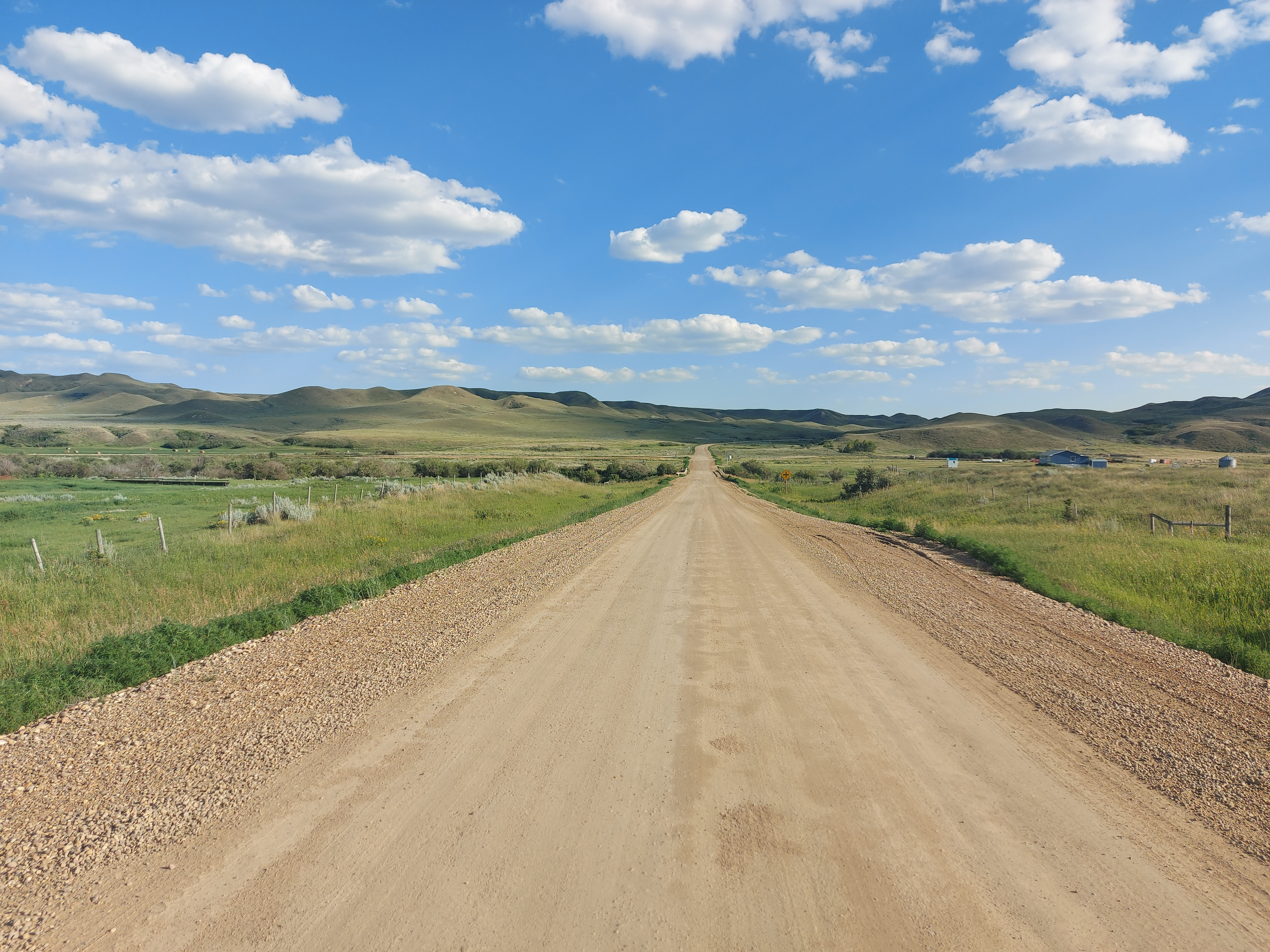
- Highway 706 entering Ravenscrag and approaching the bridge across the Frenchman River

- Location within Saskatchewan Location within Canada
- Coordinates: 49.50°N 109.2675°W
- Country: Canada
- Province: Saskatchewan
- Region: Southwest
- Census division: 4
- Rural Municipality: White Valley
- Established (Post office): 1912-08-01 (closed 1986-06-23)

Government
  - Governing body: Rural Municipality of White Valley
- Time zone: CST
- Postal code: S0N 2C0
- Area code: 306
- Highways: Highway 706
- Railways: Canadian Pacific Railway

Ravenscrag is an unincorporated community within the Rural Municipality of White Valley No. 49, Saskatchewan, Canada. The community is located on Highway 706, along the Frenchman River, 60 kilometres (37 mi) east of the Alberta–Saskatchewan border, and about 185 kilometres (115 mi) southwest of the city of Swift Current.

== History ==
Ravenscrag was once a community of over 100 people. Since the Great Depression, the town's population has dropped to one family. It once had "three general stores, two livery barns, a large stockyard and many other businesses".

The settlement gave its name to the Ravenscrag Formation, a stratigraphical unit of the Western Canadian Sedimentary Basin, defined in 1918 by N.B. Davis at Ravenscrag Butte. The formation lies north-east of the community.

== See also ==
- Scottish place names in Canada
- List of communities in Saskatchewan
- Lists of ghost towns in Canada
- List of ghost towns in Saskatchewan
