= White Valley =

White Valley may refer to:

== Antarctica ==
White Valley (Antarctica), a valley in the Crary Mountains of Marie Byrd Land

== Canada ==
- Rural Municipality of White Valley No. 49, Saskatchewan

== United States ==
- White Valley, Arizona, in Navajo County
- White Valley, Idaho, in Oneida County
- White Valley, Massachusetts, a populated place in Worcester County
- White Valley, Nebraska, in Cherry County
- White Valley, Pennsylvania, a populated place in Westmoreland County
- Tule Valley, Utah, in Millard County (originally White Valley)
