= Eastend Reservoir =

Reservoir in Saskatchewan, Canada

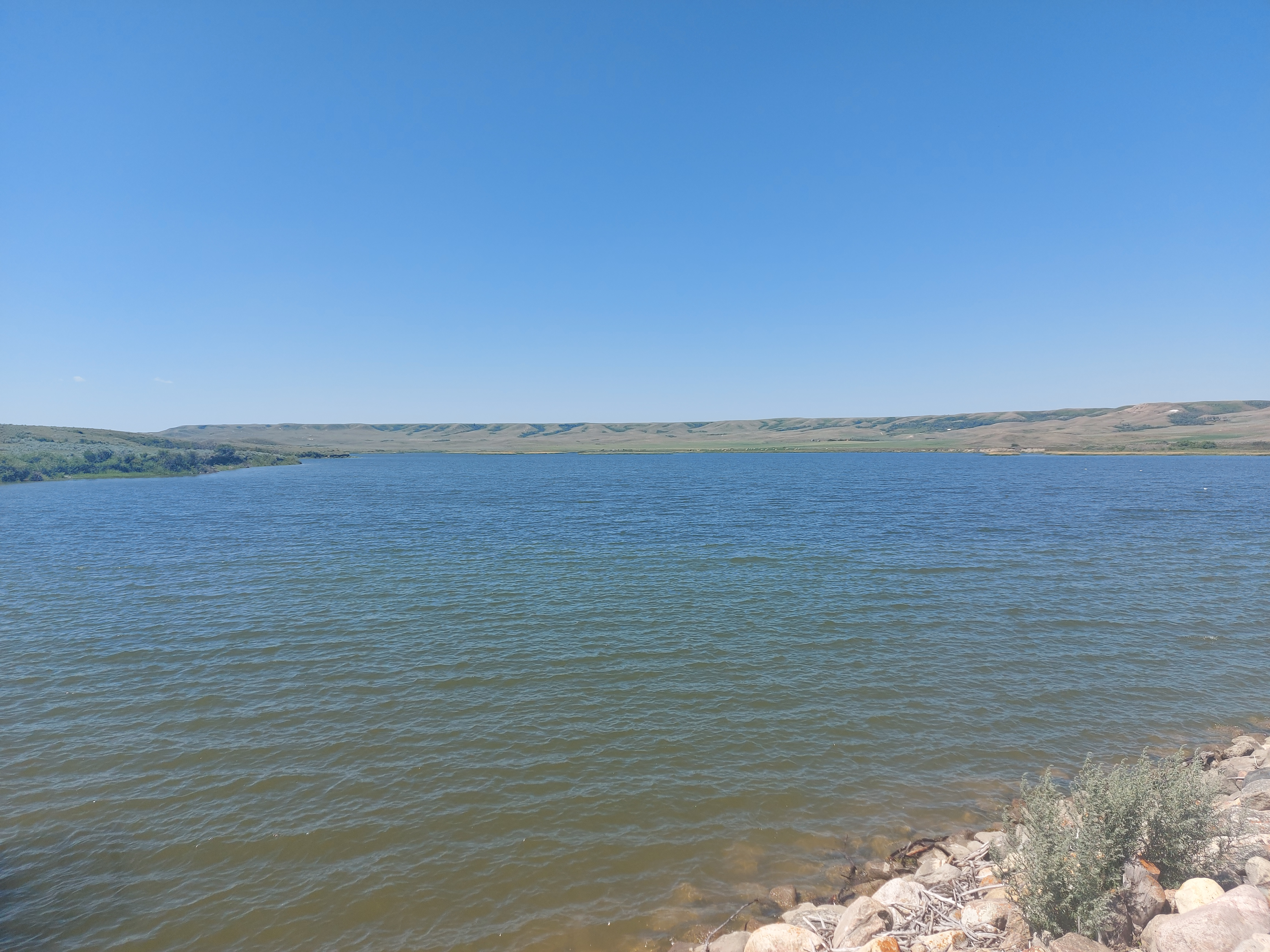
- Eastend Reservoir

- Location in Saskatchewan Eastend Reservoir (Canada)
- Location: RM of White Valley No. 49, Saskatchewan
- Coordinates: 49.5071°N 108.8674°W
- Part of: Missouri River drainage basin
- Primary inflows: Frenchman River
- River sources: Cypress Hills
- Primary outflows: Frenchman River
- Catchment area: 1,604 km^{2} (619 sq mi)
- Basin countries: Canada
- Managing agency: Saskatchewan Water Security Agency
- Built: 1936
- First flooded: 1936
- Max. length: 1.8 km (1.1 mi)
- Water volume: 2,080 dam^{3} (1,690 acre⋅ft)
- Surface elevation: 912.42 m (2,993.5 ft)

Eastend Reservoir is a reservoir in the Rural Municipality of White Valley No. 49, Saskatchewan, Canada, about 1.6 kilometres (1 mi) west of the town of Eastend along the course of the Frenchman River. It is impounded by the Eastend Dam. The reservoir and dam are owned and operated by the Saskatchewan Water Security Agency. Water Survey of Canada has a satellite telemeter at the reservoir that is jointly maintained by Canada and the United States.

The dam is an earth-filled dam that was built in 1936 and then rebuilt in 1952. It has a usable capacity of 2,080 dam^{3} (1,690 acre⋅ft) when the water levels are between the elevations of 912.4 metres (2,993.5 ft) and 918 metres (3,012 ft). The reservoir is used for irrigation and recreation.

== History ==
In 1904, a dam was built along the Frenchman River at the location of the current dam by a ranching outfit named Enright and Strong. The dam was built to supply irrigation for the surrounding pasture land. Heavy ice in 1918 "pushed out" the dam. It was not rebuilt until 1936 by the Prairie Farm Rehabilitation Administration. In 1952, heavy flooding caused the dam to be beached. It was rebuilt that year with a concrete spillway and control works. It was expanded in 1995 to increase the depth of the reservoir.

== 1952 dam breach ==
The winter of 1951–52 had a record amount of snowfall in the region. This, combined with an extremely warm spring that caused the snow to melt in three days, resulted in the reservoir overfilling and breaching the dam on 15 April 1952. The town of Eastend and the entire valley were flooded. Residents had to be evacuated to neighbouring communities. The dam was rebuilt and dykes were constructed to help prevent future flooding.

== Fish species ==
Fish commonly found in Eastend Reservoir include northern pike, walleye, and brown trout.

== Gallery ==
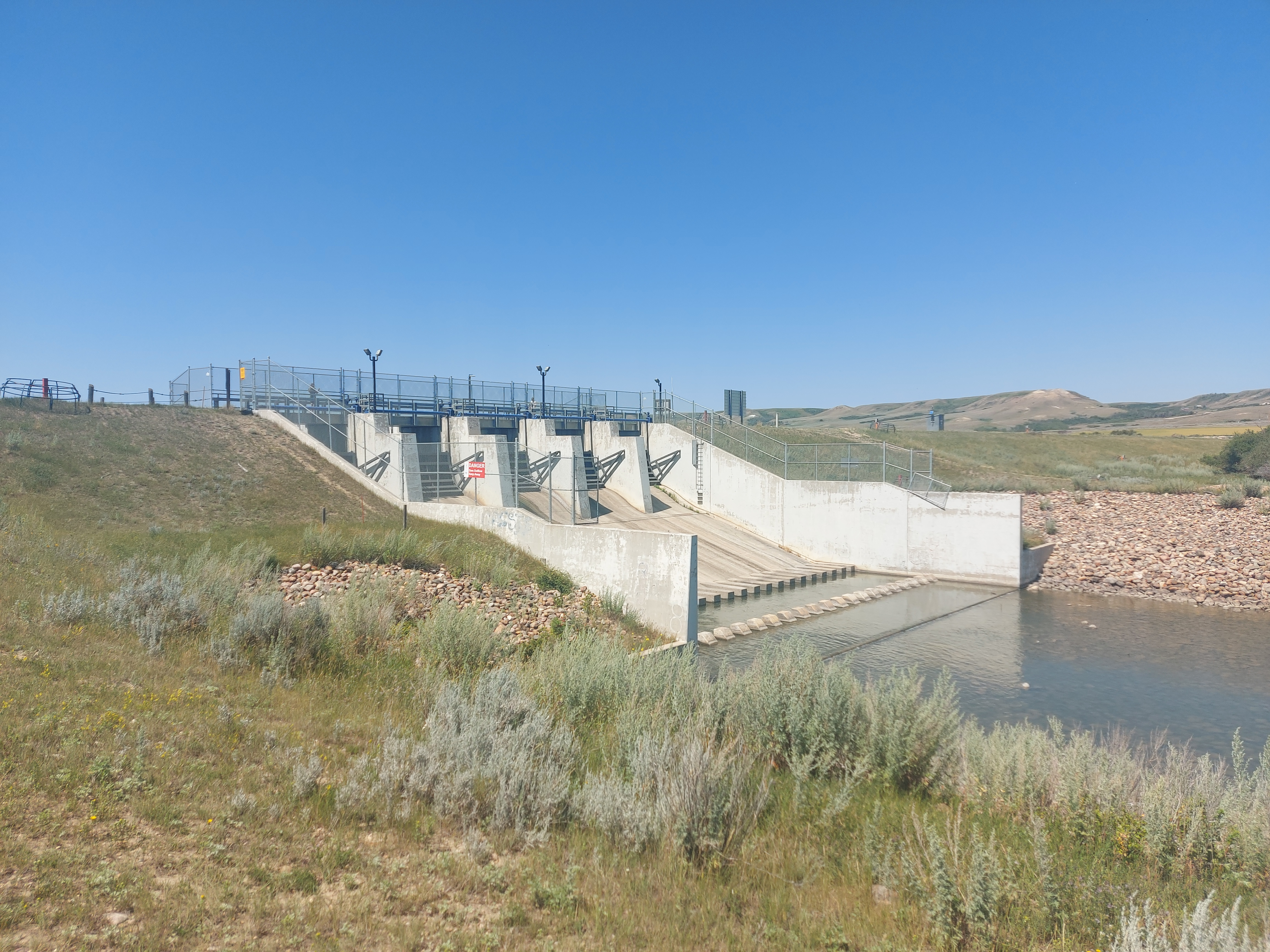
Eastend Dam, concrete spillway

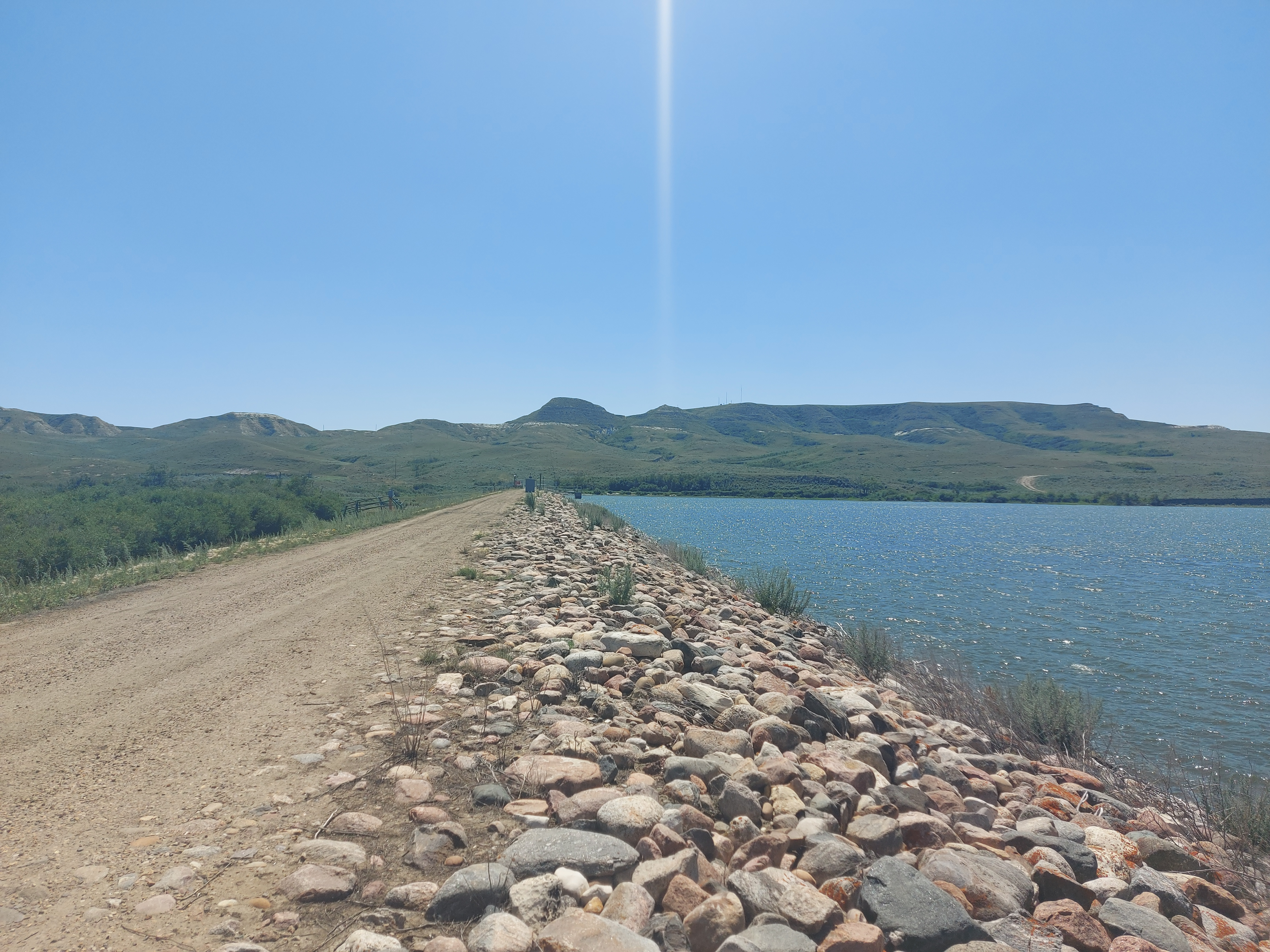
Earthen dam and reservoir

== See also ==
- List of lakes of Saskatchewan
- Dams and reservoirs in Saskatchewan
