= Ravenscrag Formation =

Stratigraphic unit of early Paleocene age in the Western Canada Sedimentary Basin

- Stratigraphic range: Paleocene
- Type: Geological formation
- Sub-units: Upper Ravenscrag; Lower Ravenscrag
- Underlies: Swift Current Formation
- Overlies: Frenchman Formation
- Thickness: up to 244 metres (800 ft)

Lithology
- Primary: Claystone, mudstone, siltstone
- Other: Sandstone, coal

Location
- Coordinates: 49.50182°N 108.97585°W
- Region: Western Canada Sedimentary Basin: Alberta; Saskatchewan
- Country: Canada

Type section
- Named for: Ravenscrag, Saskatchewan
- Named by: N.B. Davis, 1918

The Ravenscrag Formation is a stratigraphic unit of early Paleocene age in the Western Canada Sedimentary Basin. It was named for the settlement of Ravenscrag, Saskatchewan, and was first described from outcrops at Ravenscrag Butte near the Frenchman River by N.B. Davis in 1918.

The Ravenscrag Formation includes a wide range of vertebrate and plant fossils, as well as economically significant coal seams and clay deposits.

== Lithology ==
The Ravenscrag Formation is an eastward-thickening wedge of sediments. It is composed primarily of buff, grey and white silty claystone, with mudstone, siltstone, sandstone, and several significant coal seams. These sediments were deposited in floodplain, overbank and swamp environments.

== Age ==
The Ravenscrag Formation is of early Paleocene age and the base of the formation coincides with the Cretaceous-Paleogene boundary, as evidenced by biostratigraphic changes and, in some places, the presence of the terminal Cretaceous iridium anomaly. Mammalian fossils from the formation indicate North American land mammal ages of Puercan to Tiffanian.

== Distribution ==
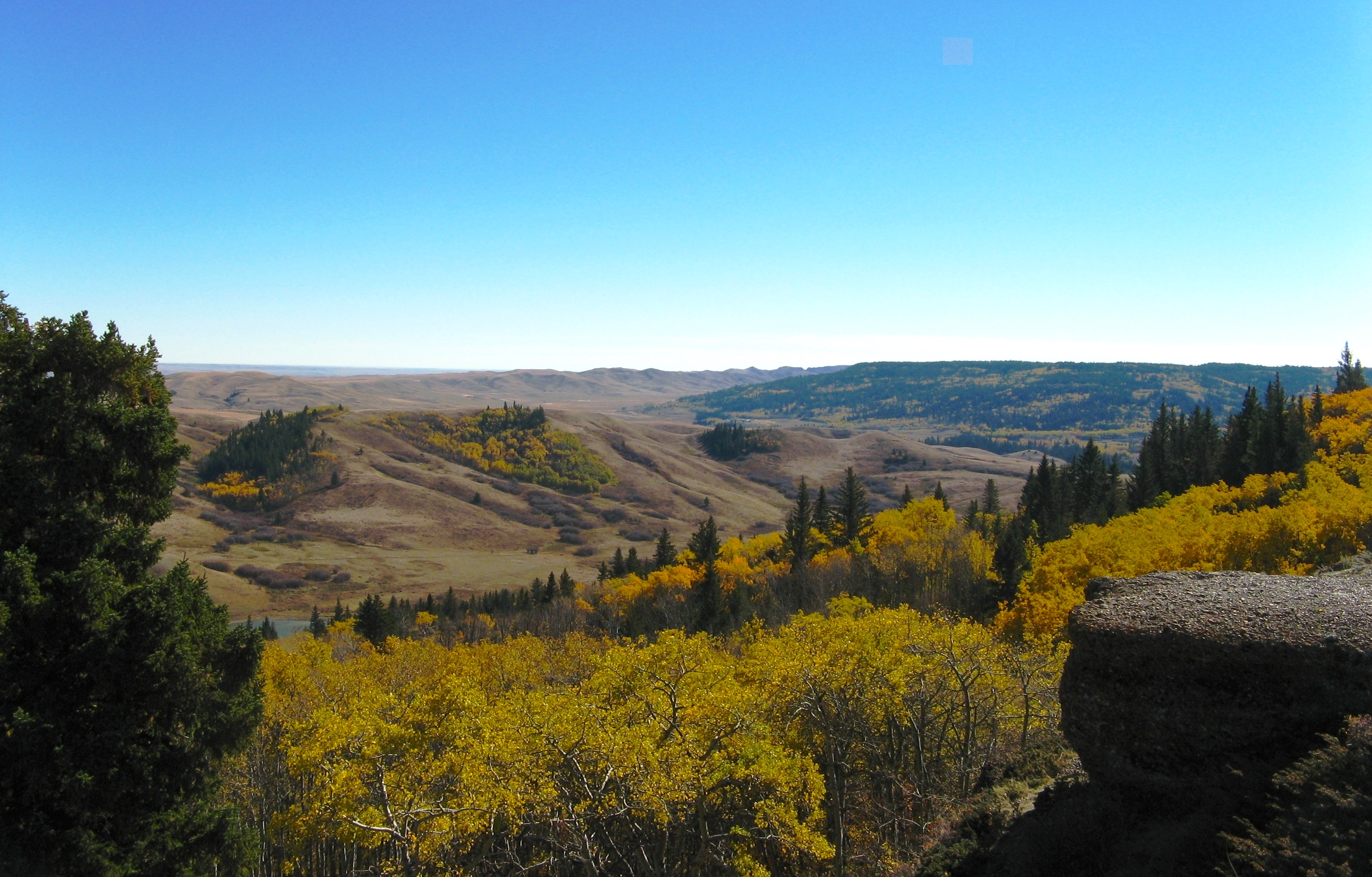
The Ravenscrag Formation is exposed along the flanks of the Cypress Hills.

The Ravenscrag Formation reaches a maximum thickness of 244 metres (800 ft) and is present in southwestern Saskatchewan and the Cypress Hills area of southeastern Alberta.

== Relationship to other units ==
Although some early workers included the underlying Frenchman Formation as the lower Ravenscrag, the two are separated by the Cretaceous-Paleogene boundary and are now treated separately. The contact is abrupt but conformable, and occurs at the base of the lowermost coal seam (the No. 1 or Ferris coal seam) in the Ravenscrag Formation.

The Ravenscrag Formation is unconformably overlain by the Eocene age Swift Current Formation, and it is exposed at surface where younger formations have been removed by erosion. It is equivalent in age to the upper part of the Scollard Formation and the lower part of the Paskapoo Formation in southern Alberta, and to the Fort Union Formation in Montana and North Dakota.

== Paleontology ==
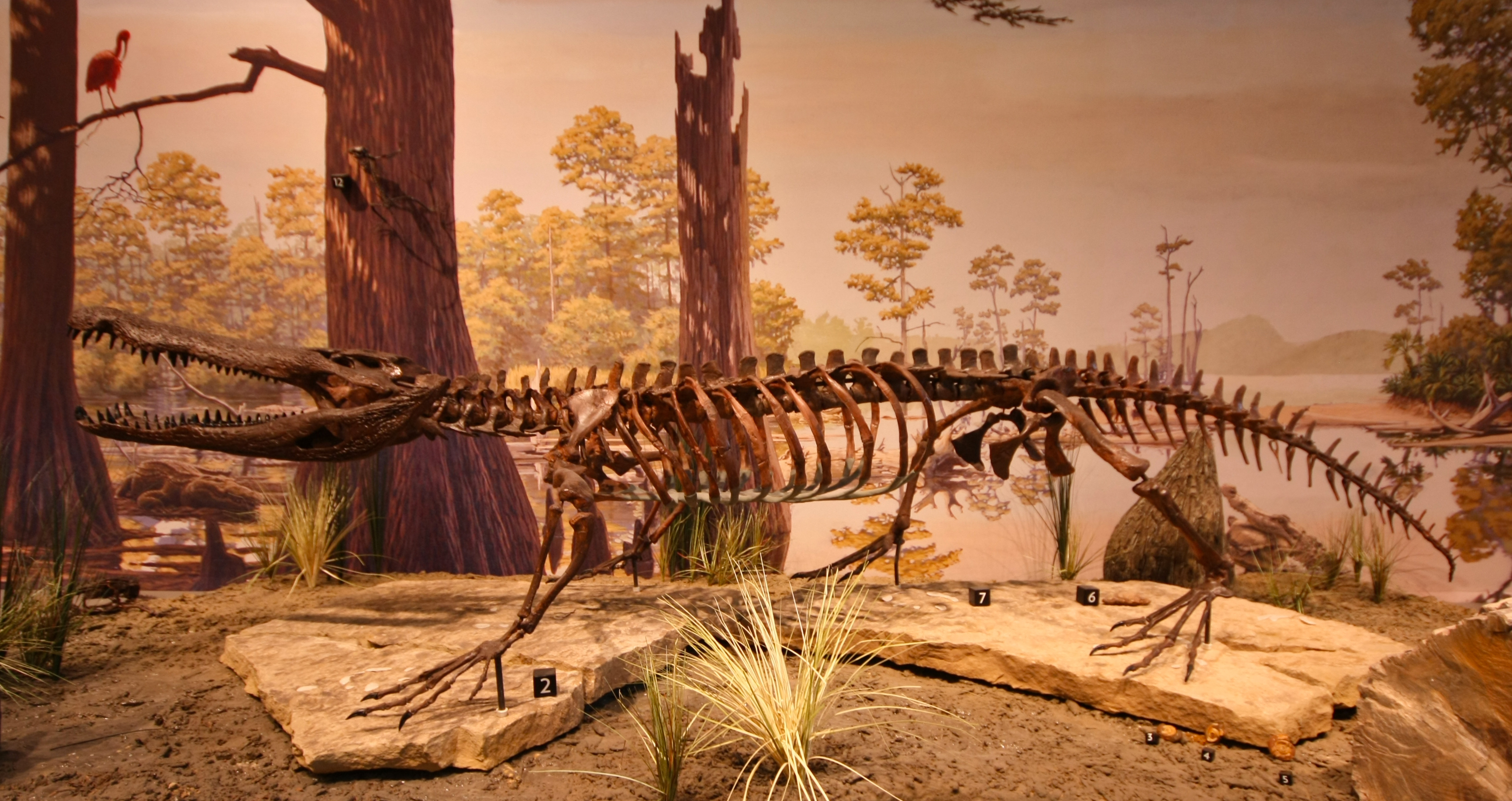
A cast of the skeleton of Borealosuchus displayed at the North Dakota Heritage Center & State Museum. Bones of this crocodilian have been found in the Ravenscrag Formation.

The Ravenscrag Formation contains remains of vertebrates that provide important information about the dawn of the age of mammals after the Cretaceous-Paleogene extinction event. Material from the following groups of mammals has been reported: Multituberculata, Eulipotyphla, Dermoptera, Primates, Carnivora, Ungulata and Pantodonta. These occur primarily as isolated teeth, fragments of jaws with teeth, and isolated skeletal parts. They are associated with the remains of fish such as Amia and Lepisosteus, small reptiles and amphibians, and crocodilians including Borealosuchus (originally Leidyosuchus) acutidentatus.

The formation also contains a wide variety of plant fossils. Ferns include species of Osmunda, Onoclea, Azolla and others. Gymnosperms are represented by remains of Ginkgo and cupressaceous conifers such as Metasequoia and Glyptostrobus, and there are numerous types of leaves, seeds, flowers and other structures from angiosperms. The fossil pollen assemblage has also been described.

== Economic geology ==
The coal seams of the Ravenscrag Formation are of lignitic rank and have a low sulphur content. They are mined at several locations in southern Saskatchewan to fuel mine-mouth electrical power stations.

Clay has been produced from the Ravenscrag Formation and used primarily for the manufacture of various types of brick.
