= Eastend =

Town in Saskatchewan, Canada

- Town
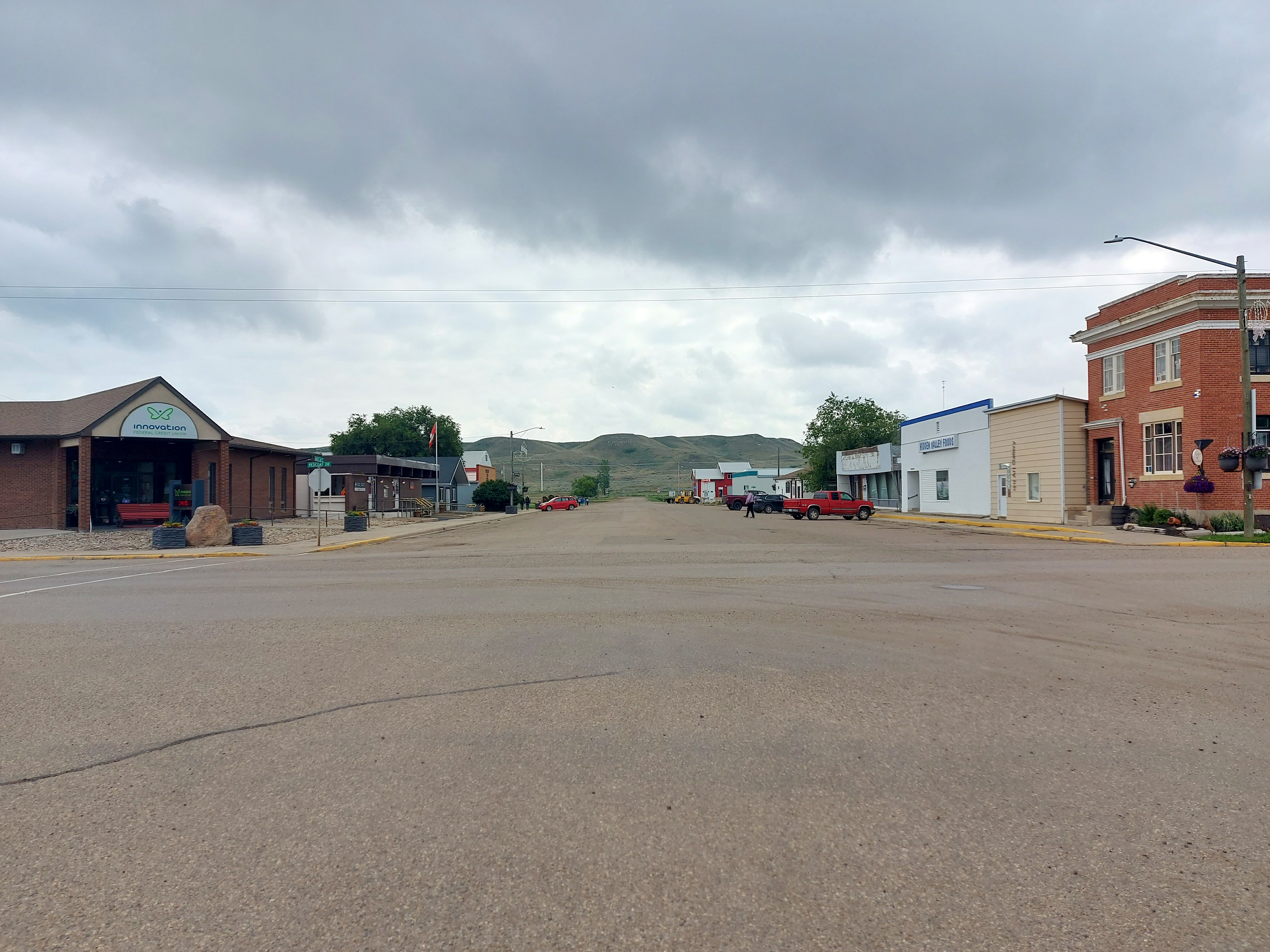
- Maple Avenue, downtown Eastend
- Nickname: Dinocountry
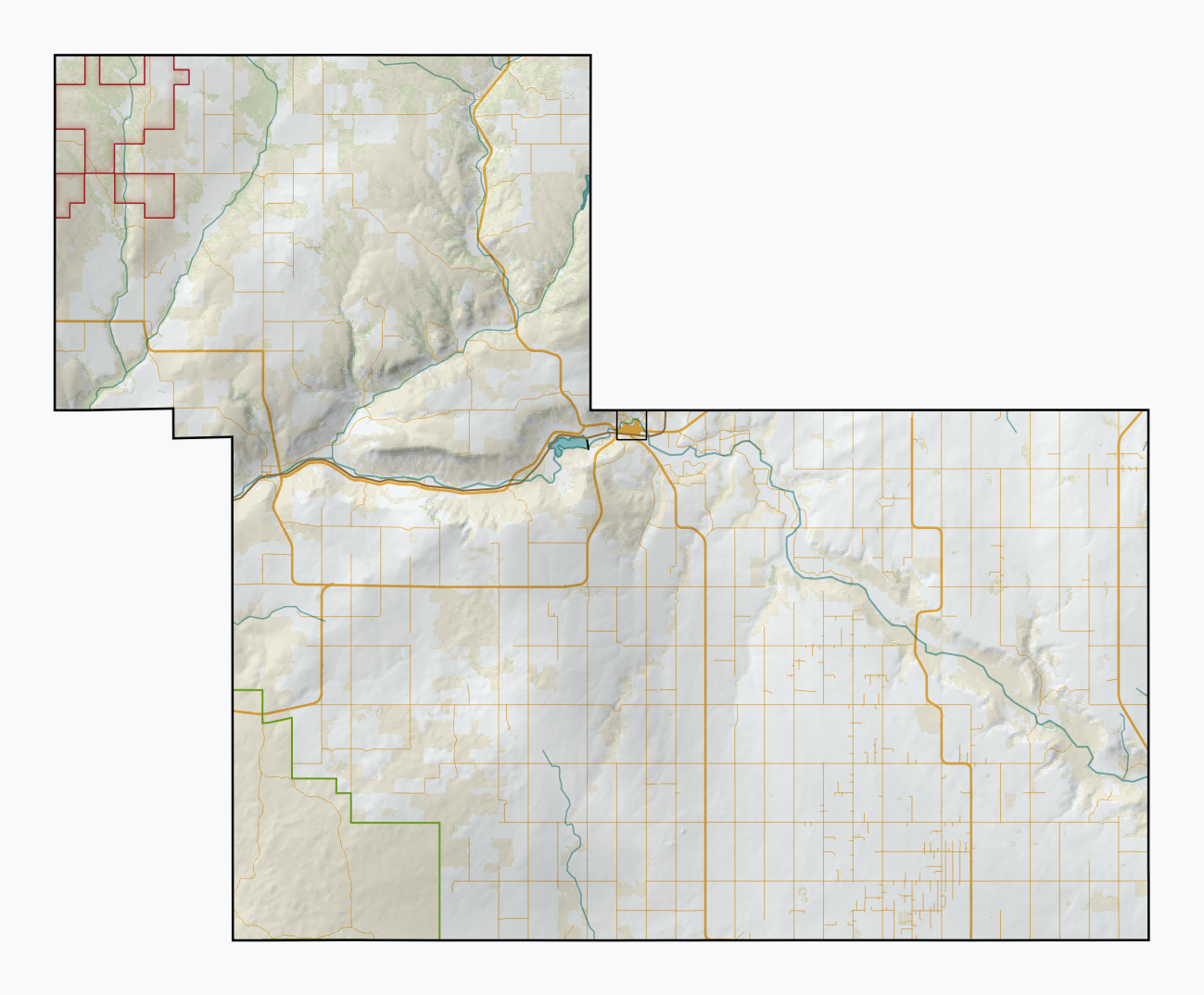
- Location within White Valley No. 49 Location within Saskatchewan
- Coordinates: 49°30′50″N 108°49′10″W
- Country: Canada
- Province: Saskatchewan
- Rural municipality: White Valley No. 49
- Post Office Founded: January 1, 1914

Government
  - Mayor: Alan Howard
  - Administrator: Tracey Schacher
  - MLA: Doug Steele
  - MP: Jeremy Patzer

Area
  - Total: 2.61 km^{2} (1.01 sq mi)

Population (2021)
  - Total: 607
  - Density: 232.5/km^{2} (602/sq mi)
- Time zone: CST
- Postal code: S0N 0T0
- Area code: 306
- Highways: Highway 13 (Red Coat Trail / Ghost Town Trail) / Highway 614 / Highway 706
- Waterways: Frenchman River
- Climate: Dfb
- Railways: Great Western Railway
- Website: Eastend, Saskatchewan

Eastend is a town in south-west part of the Canadian province of Saskatchewan, situated approximately 55 kilometres (34 mi) north of the Montana border and 85 kilometres (53 mi) east of the Alberta border.

The town is best known for the nearby discovery of a Tyrannosaurus rex skeleton nicknamed "Scotty" in 1994. The town has used the discovery of this fossil as the main centrepiece in the construction of a museum called the T.rex Discovery Centre, which opened on May 30, 2003. The centre is operated by the Royal Saskatchewan Museum, and contains the RSM Fossil Research Station.

== History ==
The Eastend Area is rich in history and geology, and is rife with paleontological sites. A Métis settlement developed north of Eastend, and in the 1870s a Hudson's Bay Company trading post was established in the region. In the mid 1880s as bison populations were being decimated on the eastern plains, the area became an important hunting ground that nearby First Nations regularly fought over. The post only lasted one season, due to hostilities between the neighbouring tribes. Many years later, this site became known as Chimney Coulee — the name being derived from the remnants of stone chimneys that were once a part of Métis homes.

In the late 1870s the North-West Mounted Police established a satellite detachment of the Fort Walsh site in Chimney Coulee, and gave the area the name of "East End", due to its location on the East End of the Cypress Hills. When the Mounties moved to the nearby townsite years later, they condensed the name into one word, and the town was Christened "Eastend". The first ranch was established in the area in 1883, and a ranch house was built in the town in 1902, the community's first residence, which remains occupied to this day. Surveyors came to the area in 1905, a precursor to the expansion of the railway.

In 1913, construction of the railway in the area began. Lumber was freighted from Gull Lake to Eastend until the railroad reached town in May, 1914. Many young people began coming to the townsite, and tents were placed across the river to accommodate them. J.C. Strong, the original owner of the townsite, donated land to build the first church, cemetery, and a lot for the first baby born in Eastend. She was born in June, 1914 and was named Eastena. On her 21st birthday she donated the lot given to her to the United Church.

=== Flood of 1952 ===
In the fall and winter of 1951 the town saw a record amount of snow. In the spring of 1952, unusually warm weather melted the snow quickly and caused a breach of the Eastend Dam and a massive flood in Eastend. The town was evacuated and residents found refuge with friends and family that lived in nearby towns. The water receded after three days, leaving immense amounts of destruction in its wake. A few years later a dyke was constructed along the river to prevent history from repeating itself.

=== Discovery of "Scotty" the Tyrannosaurs Rex ===
On August 16, 1991, then high school teacher, Robert Gebhardt from Eastend joined local palaeontologists on a prospecting expedition to the exposed bedrock along the Frenchman River Valley to learn how fossils are found and identified in the field. Within a half a day, he discovered the base of a heavily worn tooth, and a vertebra from the tail, both suggesting that they belonged to a T. rex.

== Geography ==
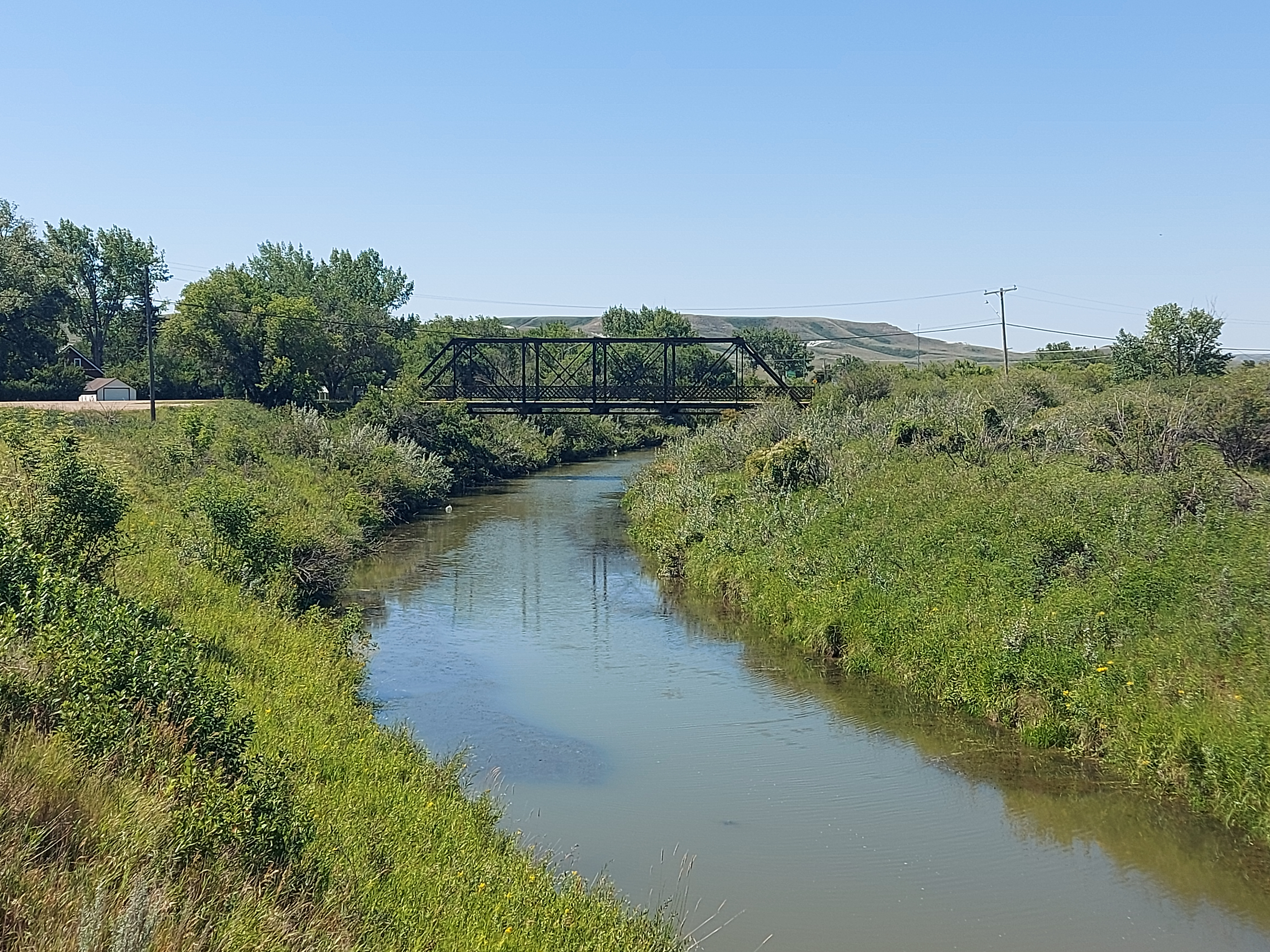
Frenchman River running through Eastend

Eastend is located south-east of the Cypress Hills, east from Ravenscrag Butte and south from Anxiety Butte. It lies at an elevation of 915 metres (3,002 ft), in the valley of the Frenchman River. The Eastend Reservoir was built in 1936 upstream from the community.

The Eastend Formation, a stratigraphical unit of the Western Canadian Sedimentary Basin was named for the town and was first defined in outcrops close to the settlement. The Eastend Formation was the final marine deposit on the plains, and was home to many marine animals.

== Demographics ==
In the 2021 Census of Population conducted by Statistics Canada, Eastend had a population of 607 living in 267 of its 335 total private dwellings, a change of 20.7% from its 2016 population of 503. With a land area of 2.61 km^{2} (1.01 sq mi), it had a population density of 232.6/km^{2} (602.3/sq mi) in 2021.

Canada census – Eastend community profile

	2021	2016	2011
Population	607 (+20.7% from 2016)	503 (-4.6% from 2011)	527 (11.9% from 2006)
Land area	2.61 km^{2} (1.01 sq mi)	2.71 km^{2} (1.05 sq mi)	2.71 km^{2} (1.05 sq mi)
Population density	232.5/km^{2} (602/sq mi)	185.8/km^{2} (481/sq mi)	194.7/km^{2} (504/sq mi)
Median age	56.0 (M: 52.8, F: 59.2)		56.6 (M: 54.7, F: 59.4)
Private dwellings	335 (total) 267 (occupied)	329 (total)	332 (total)
Median household income	$58,000

References: 2021 2016 2011

== Transportation ==
Highway 13 and Highway 614 intersect in Eastend. The Great Western Railway (formerly the Altawan subdivision of the Canadian Pacific Railway) tracks also pass through the town.

== Attractions ==
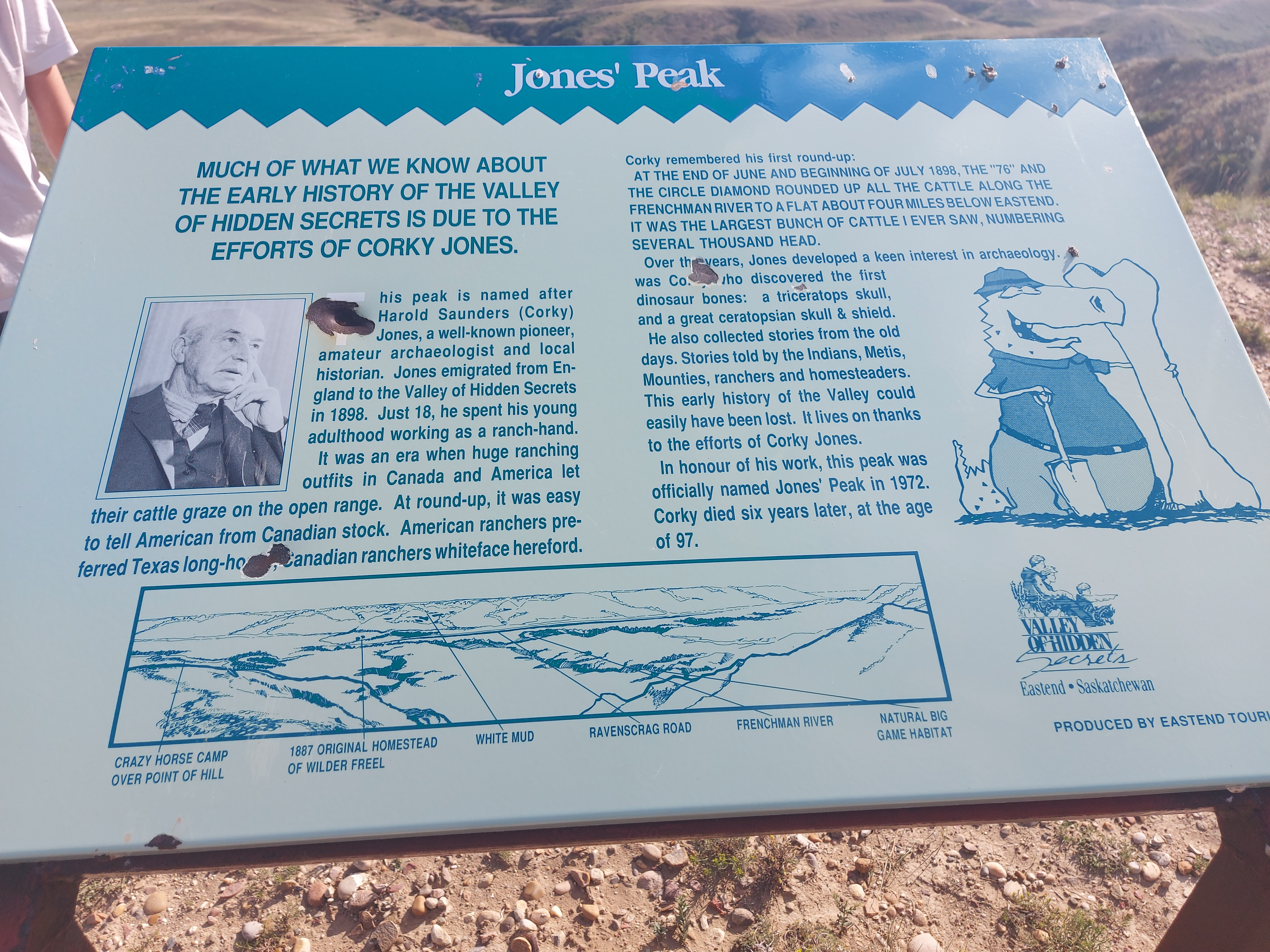
The plaque at the top of Jones' Peak

- T.rex Discovery Centre is a world class facility to house the fossil record of the Eastend area started many years before the discovery of "Scotty" the T.Rex in 1994.
- The Eastend Community Swimming Pool was built in 1971, and remodelled in 2016. It now features a 25-metre outdoor swimming pool, splash park, and two waterslides.
- Jones' Peak is located six miles south-west of Eastend. It was named after H.S. "Corky" Jones for his tireless work as an amateur paleontologist and in preserving the history of Eastend.
- Streambank Golf Course, a 9-hole golf course located in town.
- Pine Cree Regional Park
- Chimney Coulee Historic Site is the "archaeological remains of a Métis wintering village and a North-West Mounted Police post" about 6 km (3.7 mi) north of Eastend. It is on the eastern slopes of the Cypress Hills and encompasses 12.5 ha (31 acres) of land in a coulee.
- Chocolate Peak is 1.6 km (1 mi) north-west of Eastend. It "was originally known as Wedding Cake Hill with a large deposit of white mud clay at its base". But in 1930, a miner burned the coal seam on top in an attempt to make mining the white clay easier. The coal burned for years "turning the white clay to a chocolate brown colour".

== Notable residents ==
- Sharon Butala, Canadian author who resides on a ranch outside of Eastend
- Wallace Stegner lived in Eastend between 1914 and 1920 and featured it as the village "Whitemud" in his book Wolf Willow.

== See also ==
- List of towns in Saskatchewan
- List of communities in Saskatchewan
