= Royal Saskatchewan Museum =

Natural history museum in Regina, Saskatchewan

Coordinates: 50°26′23.76″N 104°37′1.08″W

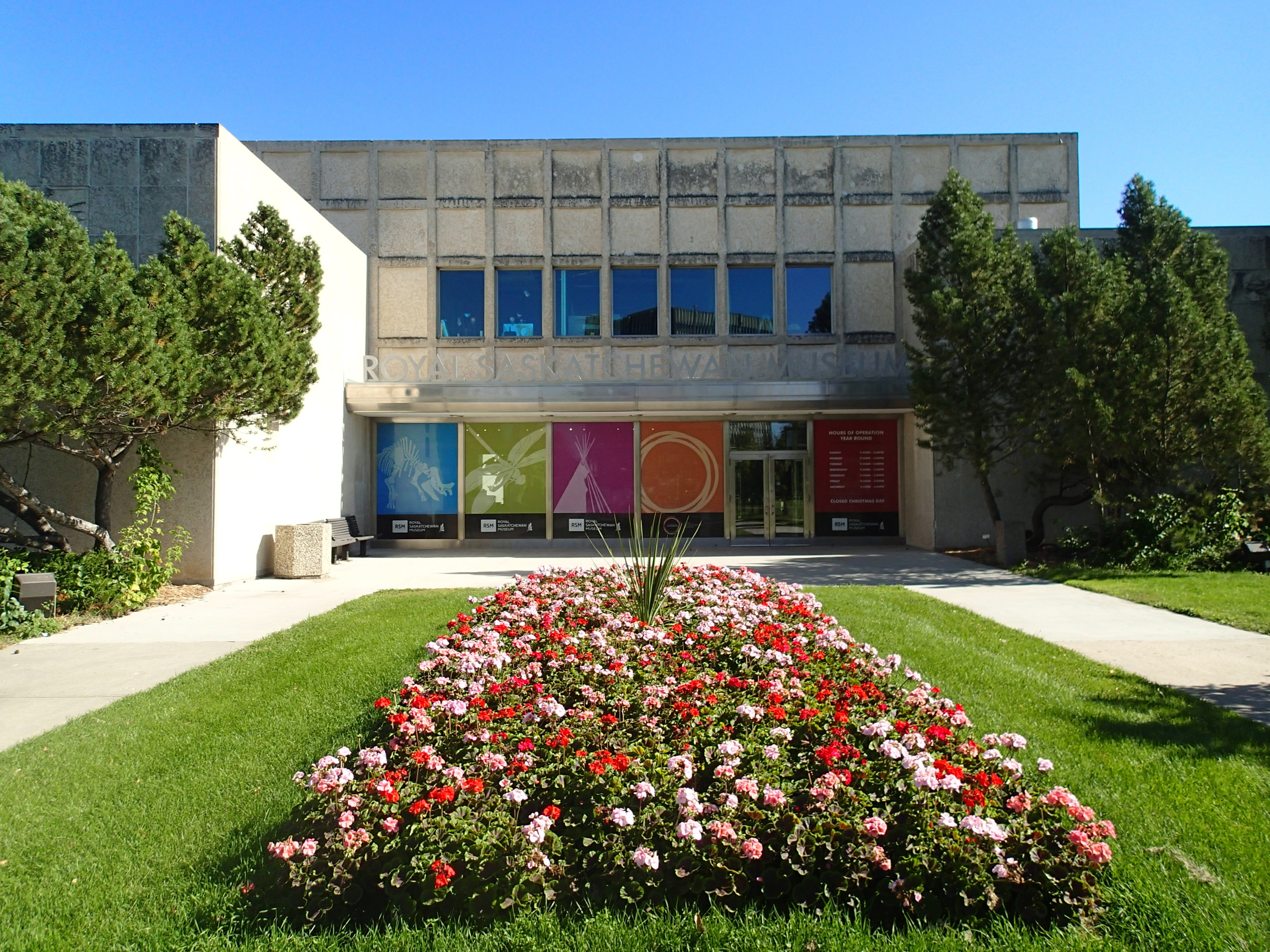

- Location within Saskatchewan
- Former name: Saskatchewan Museum of Natural History
- Established: 1906
- Location: 2445 Albert Street Regina, Saskatchewan, Canada
- Type: Natural history
- Collection size: 3,500,000
- Visitors: 139,122 (2017)
- Owner: Government of Saskatchewan
- Website: www.royalsaskmuseum.ca

The Royal Saskatchewan Museum (RSM) is a Canadian natural history museum in Regina, Saskatchewan. Founded in 1906, it is the first museum in Saskatchewan and the first provincial museum among the three Prairie provinces. The institution was formed to secure and preserve natural history specimens and objects of historical and ethnological interest.

Originally known as the Saskatchewan Museum of Natural History, the museum received royal patronage from Queen Elizabeth II, and was renamed the Royal Saskatchewan Museum in 1993.

== History ==
Between 1906 and 1945 the museum occupied several premises including the Regina Trading Company Building, the Provincial Legislative Building, and the Normal School (the easternmost historic building on the "College Avenue" campus of the University of Regina). During the Second World War the museum's collections were taken out of public display and stored initially in the General Motors Building (east on Dewdney Avenue) to permit the Normal School to be used for the Commonwealth Air Training Plan, and then, when the GM building was also requisitioned, in Pilkington's Glass Company Building. The collections returned to the Normal School in 1944 and opened to the public again in 1946.

In 1953, the provincial government began construction of the current museum building on the corner of Albert Street and College Avenue, the site of the abandoned Chateau Qu'Appelle Hotel, as a Saskatchewan Golden Jubilee project. Partly for aesthetic reasons and partly to avoid the expansive task of uprooting the pilings, the museum was built on an angle with a large front lawn. The new premises were opened by Governor General Vincent Massey on May 16, 1955. To reflect the areas of devotion, the museum adopted the name Saskatchewan Museum of Natural History. This name remained until 1993 when they received royal designation from Queen Elizabeth II, Queen of Canada, and became the Royal Saskatchewan Museum.

== Galleries ==
The museum collection, then housed in the Provincial Legislative Building, was decimated by the 1912 Regina Cyclone. The collection was severely damaged again in 1990 when fire broke out in the First Nations Gallery, which was then under construction. Smoke damage required the museum to close for four months. Since then, the museum has undergone significant revitalization with the development of the First Nations Gallery, Life Sciences Gallery, acquisition of the T.rex Discovery Centre and the renovation of the Earth Sciences Gallery.

=== Earth Sciences Gallery ===
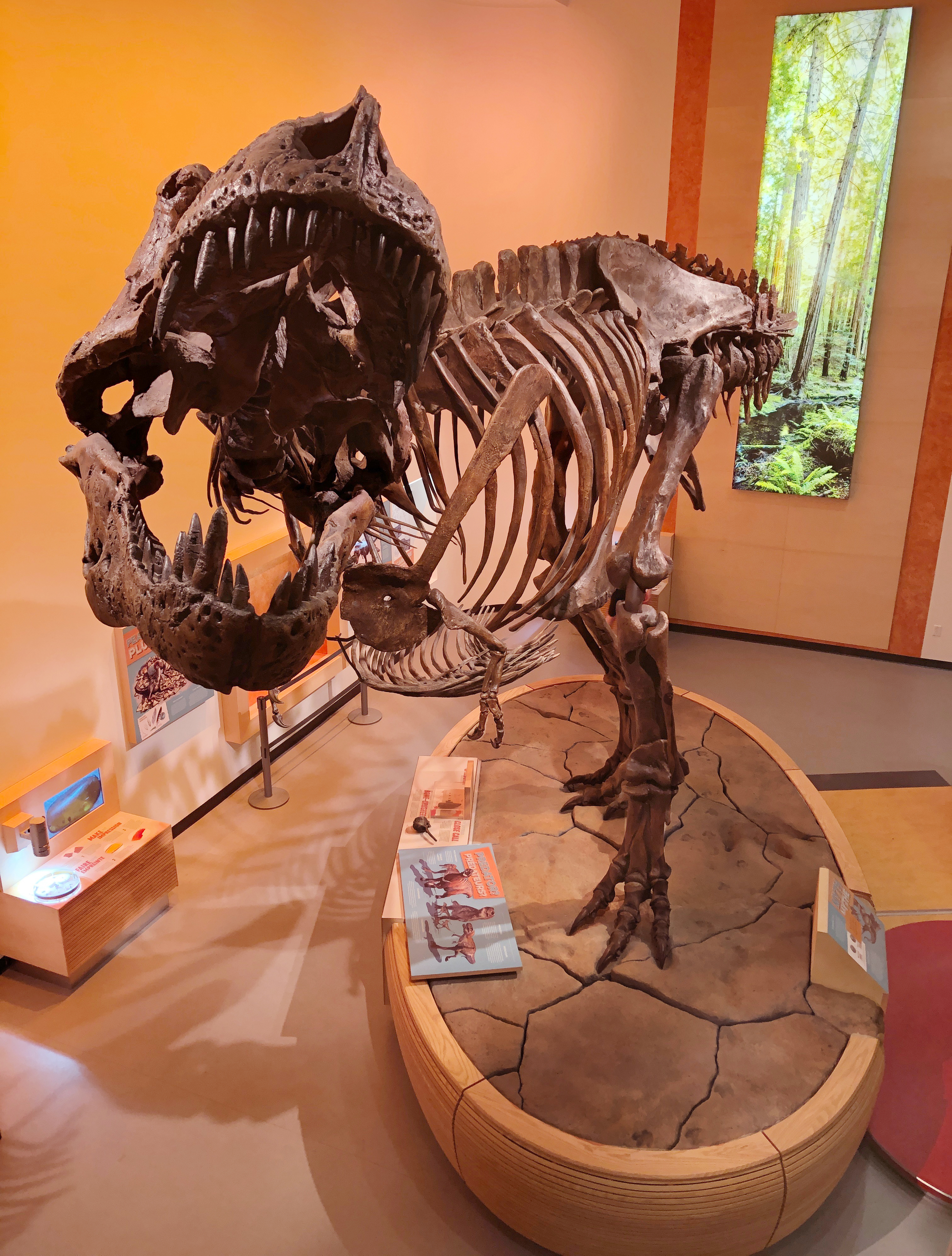
Life-size cast of Scotty at the CN T. rex Gallery

The Earth Science Gallery features the dynamic earth history of Saskatchewan, including displays of mineral resources, fossils of extinct dinosaurs and other animals, and panels showing the geological formation of Saskatchewan over two billion years.

==== CN T. rex Gallery ====
On May 17, 2019, a life-size cast of Scotty, the world's largest T. rex, went on display in the two-story CN T.rex Gallery, a gallery within the museum's Earth Science gallery. Originally discovered by Royal Saskatchewan Museum research team in Saskatchewan's Frenchman River Valley on August 16, 1991, specimen RSM P2523.8 is now on display in two locations in Saskatchewan: Regina and Eastend. The gallery highlights Scotty's injuries accumulated over its lifetime, and showcases the flora and fauna that lived alongside the T. rex.

=== First Nations Gallery ===
Opened on June 26, 1993, this gallery was a collaborative effort between researchers, Indigenous Elders, students and community members. Showcasing miniature and life-size dioramas, the gallery examines the culture, traditions, trade, treaties and communities of Saskatchewan's Indigenous people over the past 10,000 years.

=== Life Sciences Gallery ===
Sixteen detailed life-size dioramas Illustrates the ecoregions and seasons of Saskatchewan. Opened in June 2001 the gallery describes how different life forms are interconnected. In a celebration of Saskatchewan's landscapes and biodiversity, visitors can see what it's like inside a bear's den, a beaver's lodge or a snake's hibernaculum.

== Collections ==
The museum has a collection size of over 3.5 million, which includes 3 million archaeological artifacts, 250,000 insects, 37,500 fossils, 10,000 birds, 6,500 plants, 4,000 arachnids, 3,7000 mammals, 500 reptiles and 300 fish. This collection supports research that contributes to the knowledge of Saskatchewan's natural history and Indigenous cultures.

== T.rex Discovery Centre ==
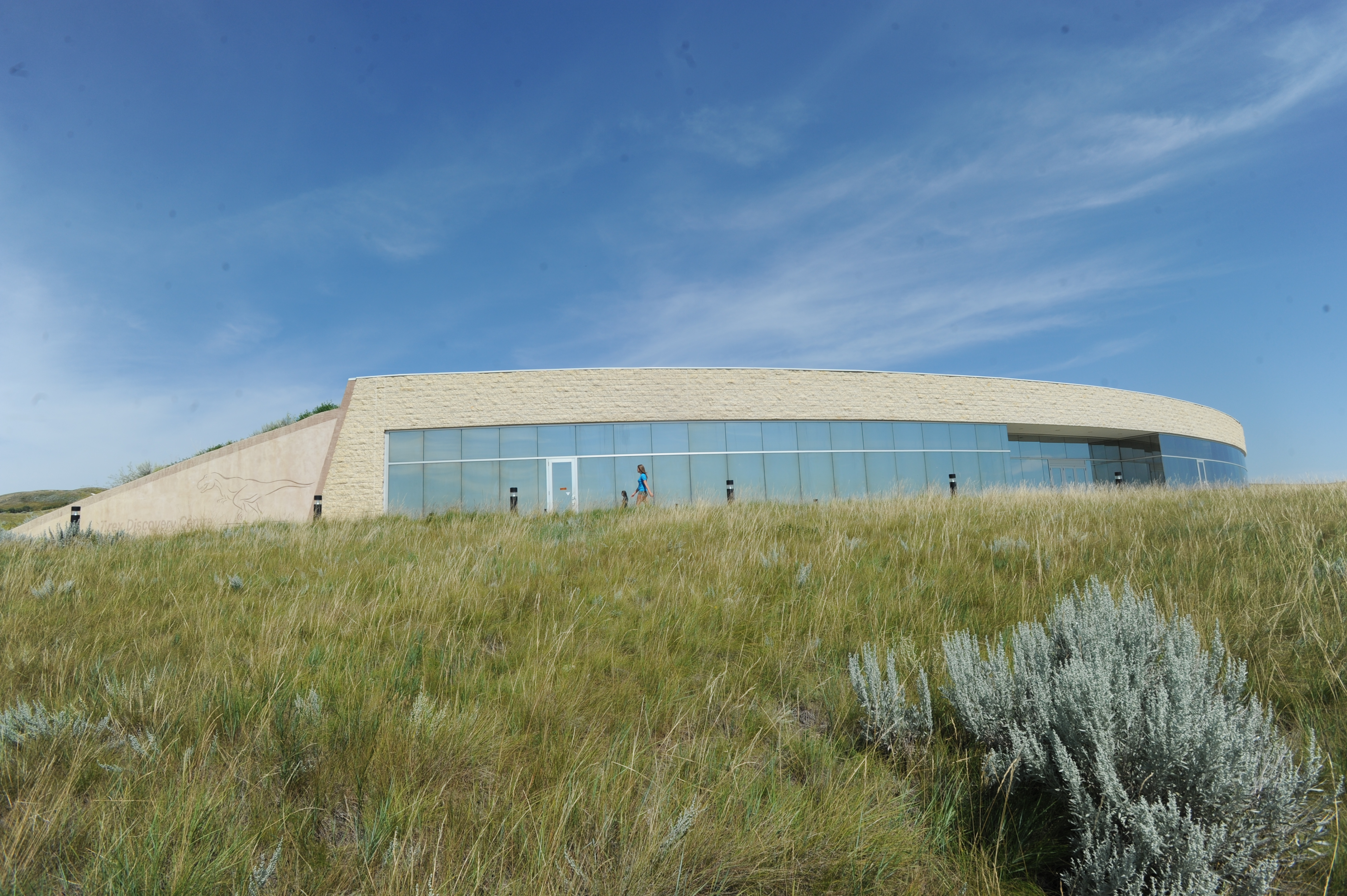
Exterior of the T.rex Discovery Centre, a museum in Eastend operated by RSM

On February 14, 2013, the Royal Saskatchewan Museum assumed operations of the T.rex Discovery Centre. Located in Eastend, the centre houses a number of fossils from the Cretaceous and Cenozoic periods.

The T.rex Discovery Centre was established as a facility to house the fossil record of southwest Saskatchewan. The town of Eastend, through a series of public meetings identified a need for a palaeontological centre to showcase the rich fossil record of the Frenchman River Valley and the Cypress Hills. The T.rex Discovery Centre opened in 2001 in the Frenchman River Valley, just north of Eastend.

== Affiliations ==
The museum is affiliated with the Canadian Museums Association, the Canadian Heritage Information Network, and the Virtual Museum of Canada.

== Displays ==
=== Prehistory ===
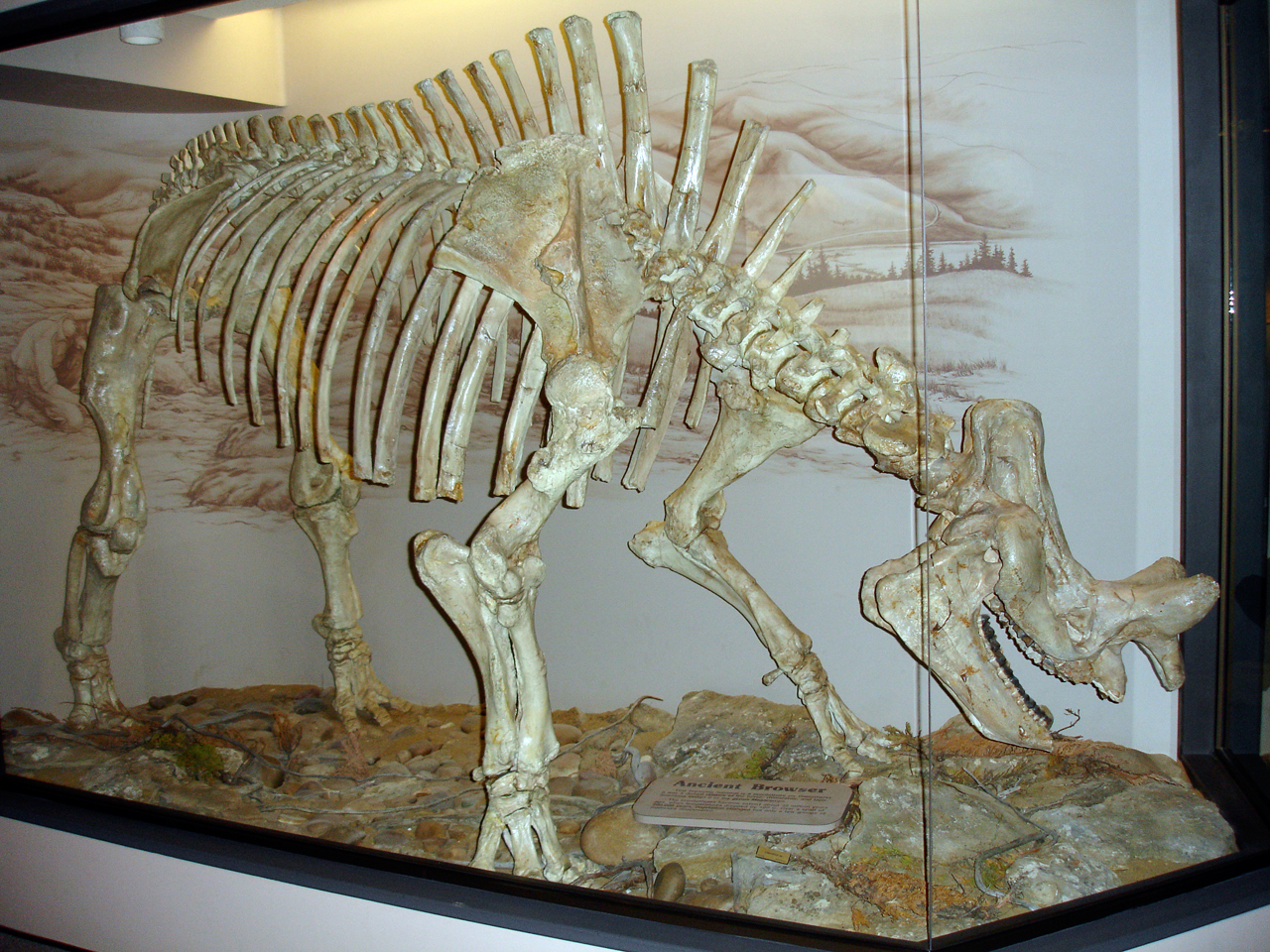
After the extinction of the dinosaurs, Saskatchewan became a grassland region and home to many ancient mammal species.

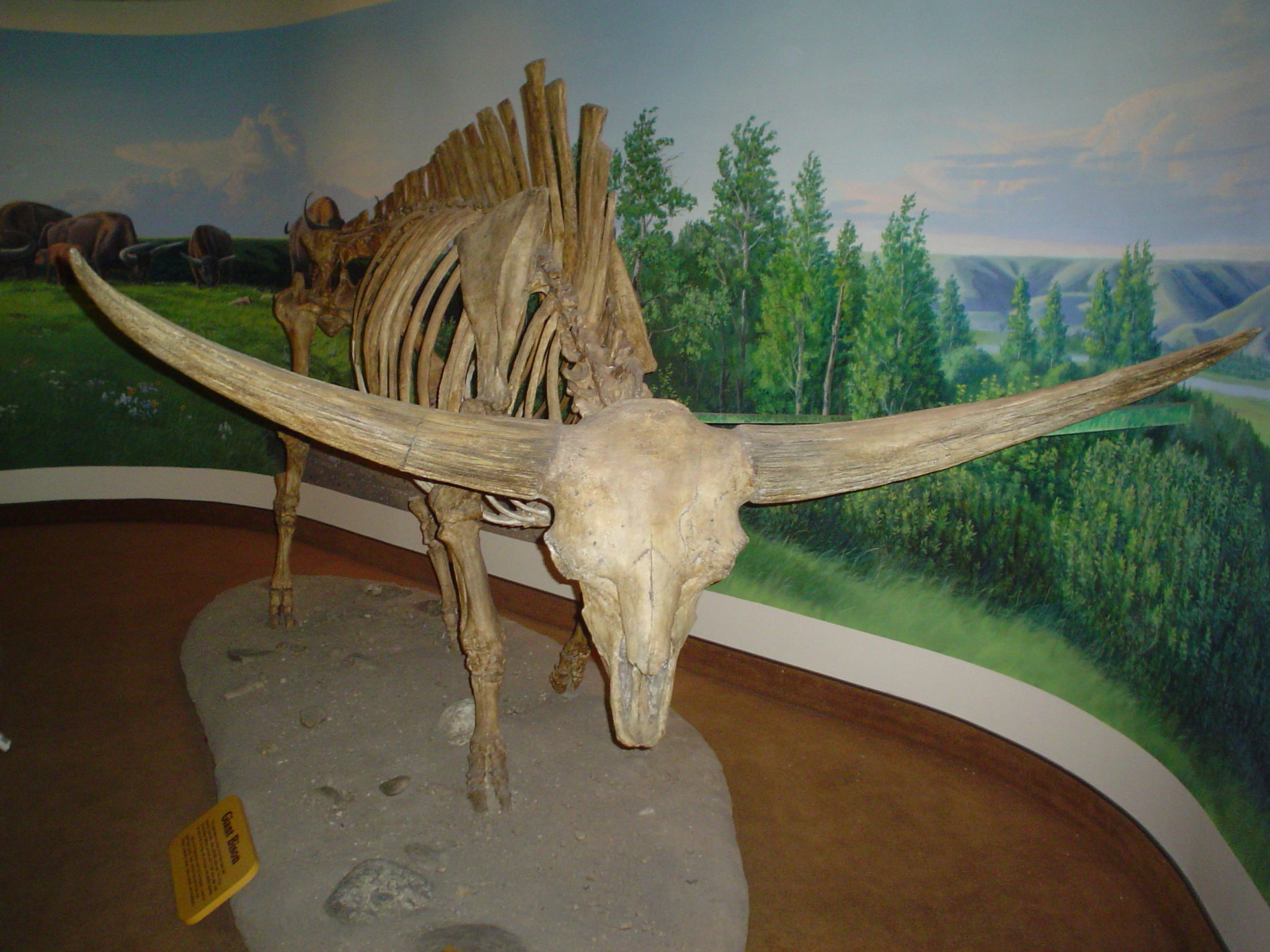
Fossils of the Bison latifrons

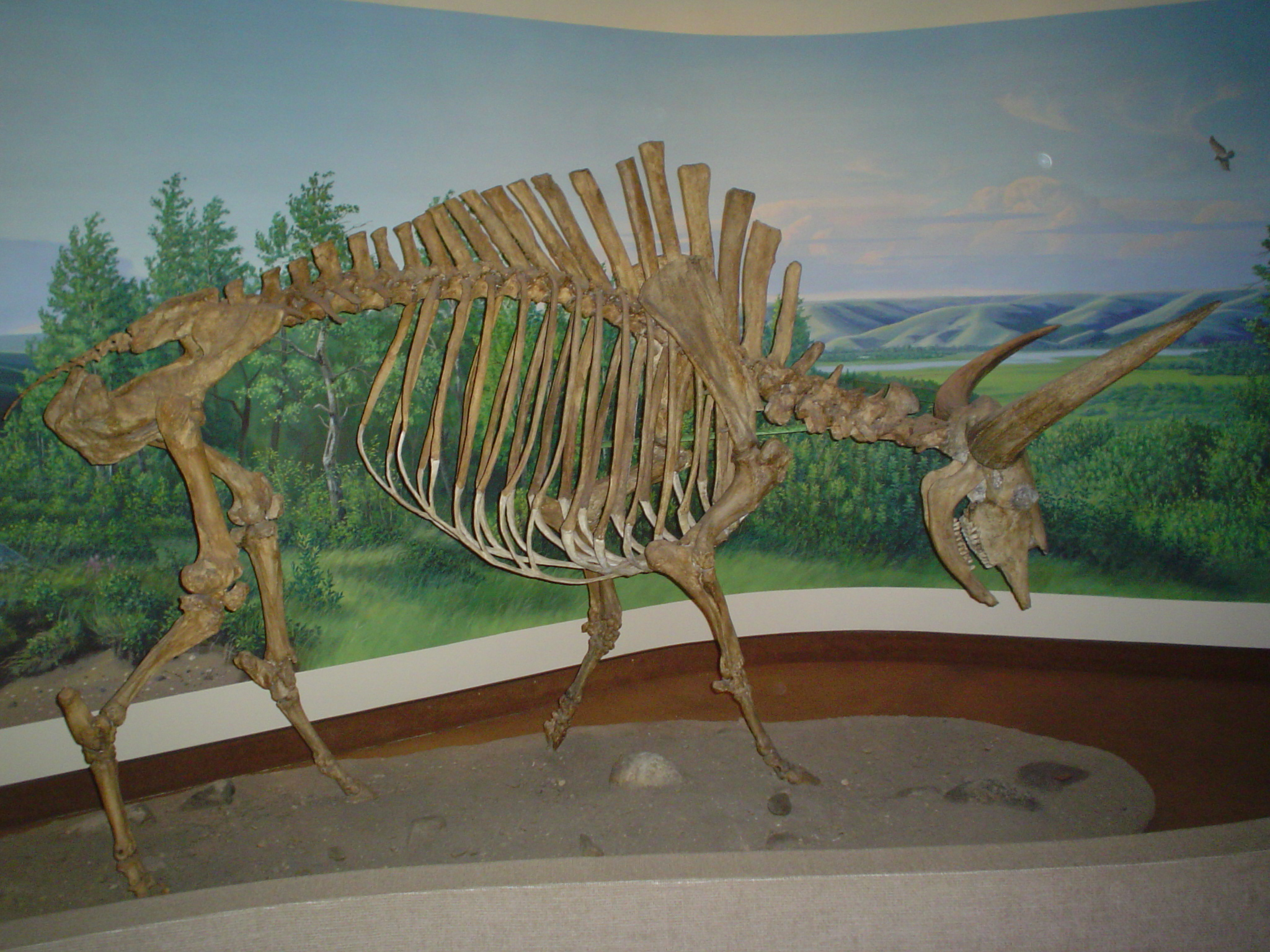
Fossils of the Bison latifrons

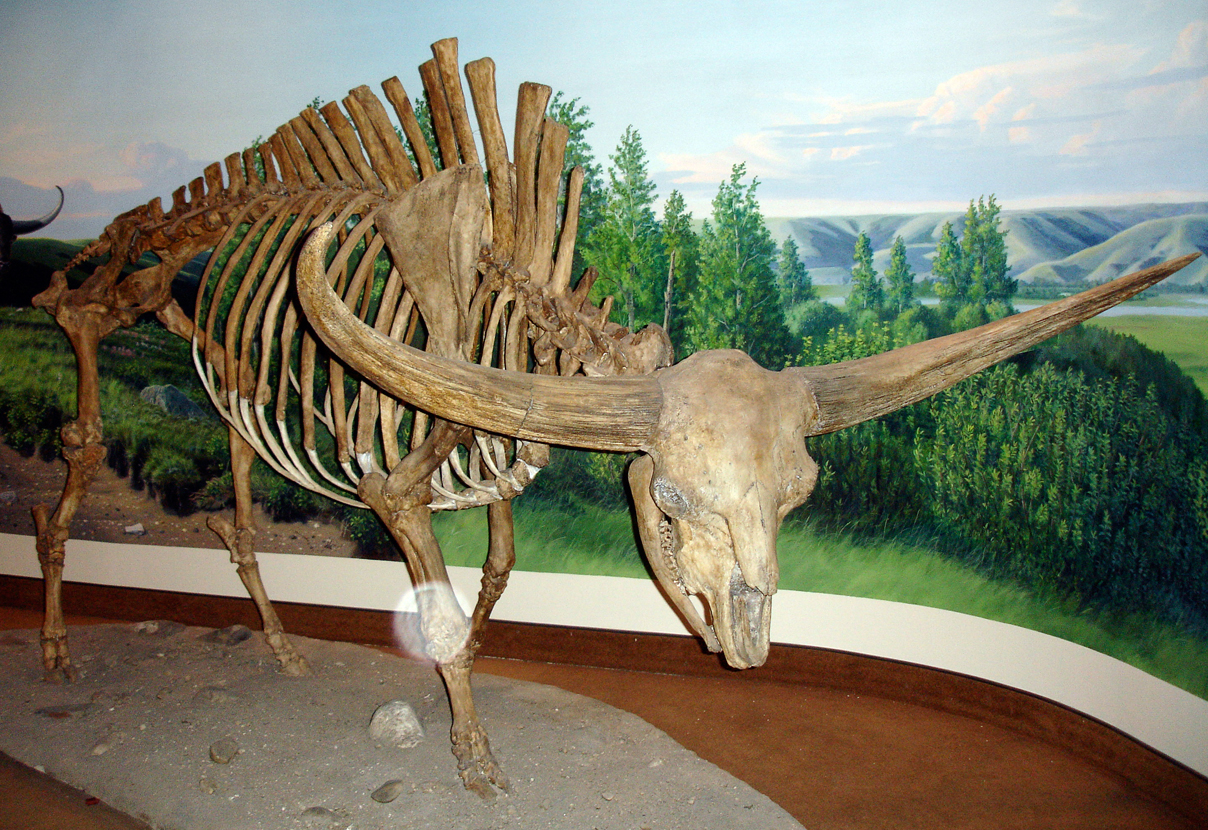
Fossils of the Bison latifrons

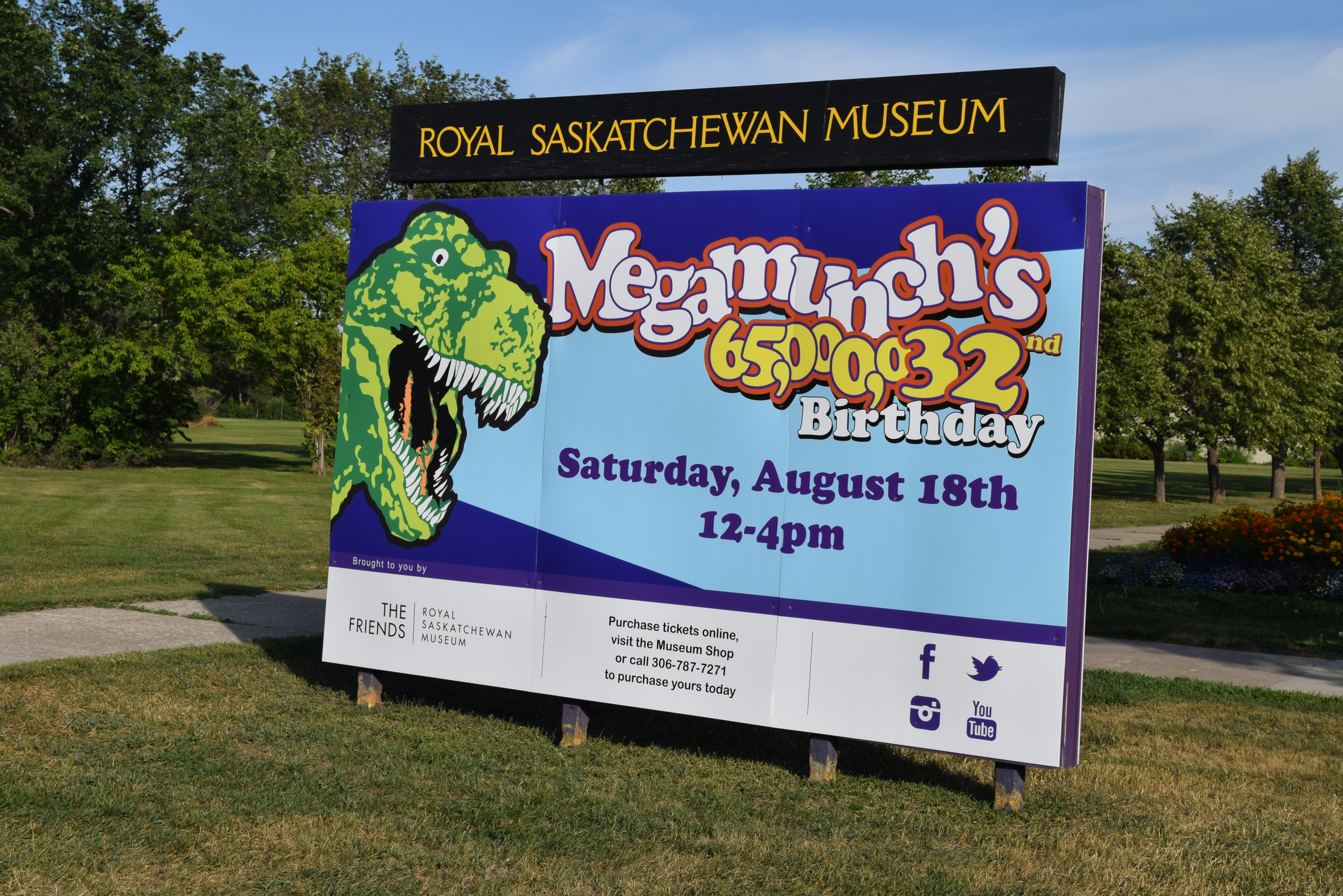
Megamuch at the Rotal Saskarchewan Museum! - Regina

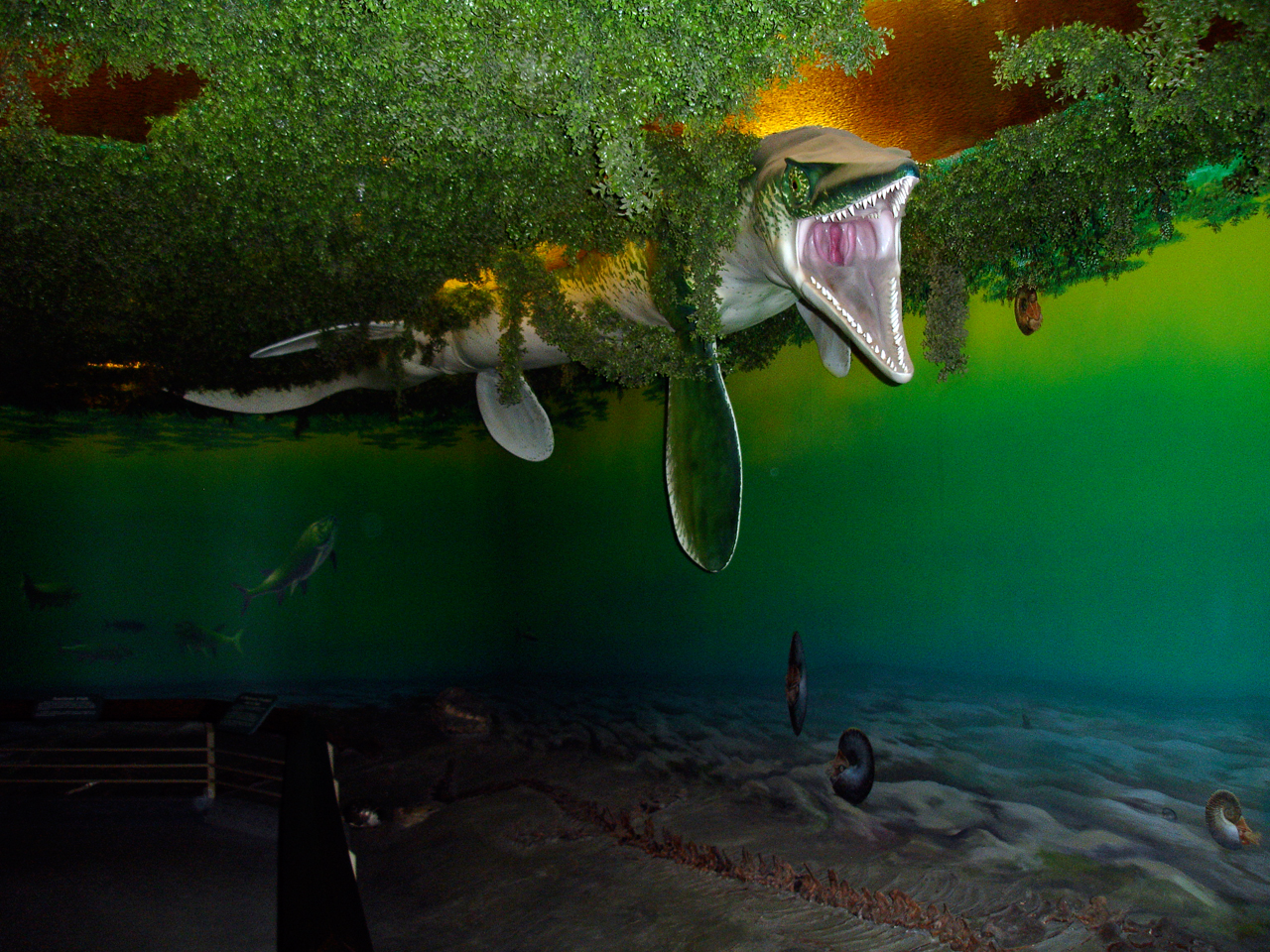
This is part of the museum that shows the province's prehistory, including when it was partly covered by ocean and home to aquatic dinosaurs like this mosasaur.

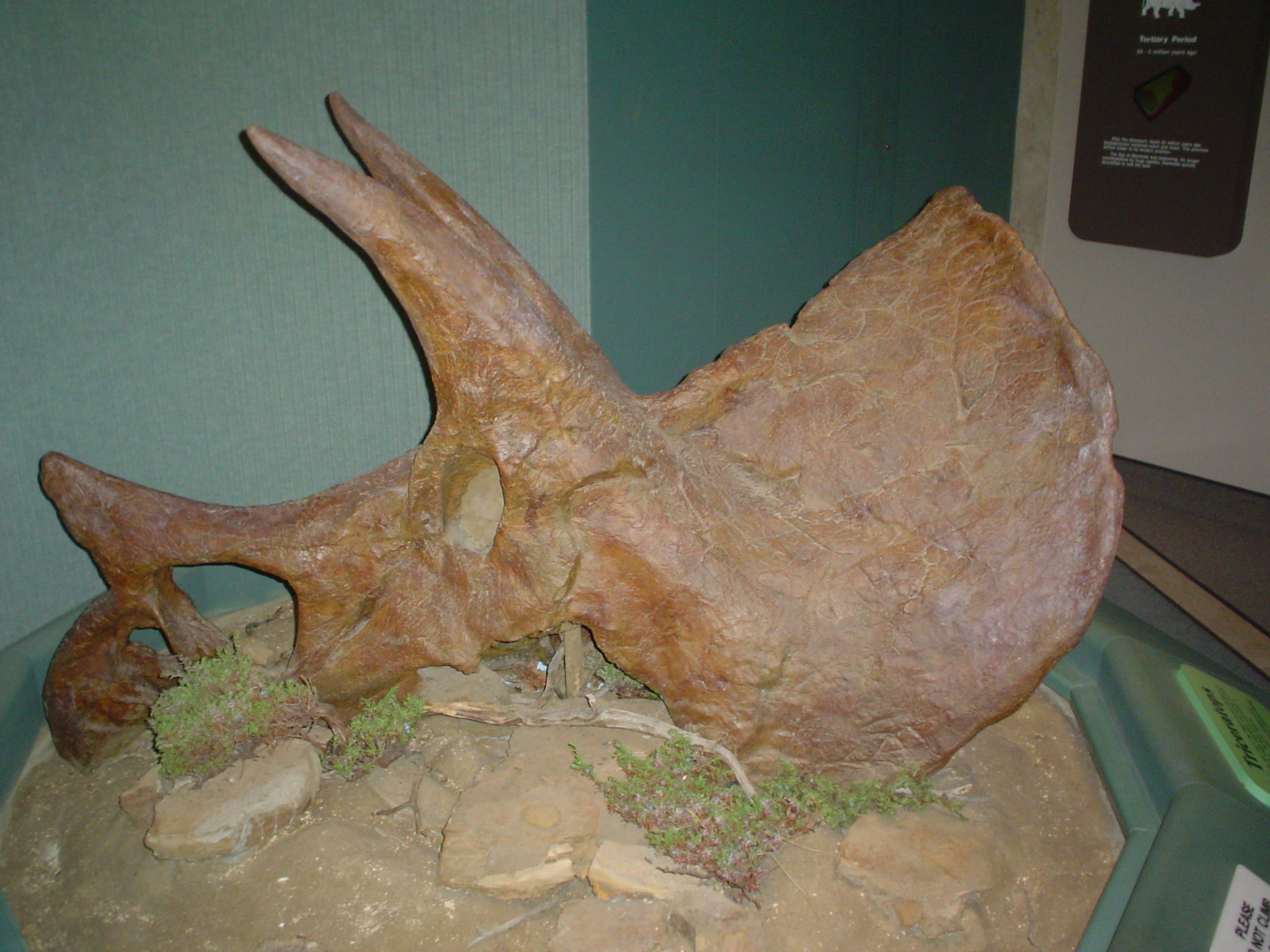
triceratops skull

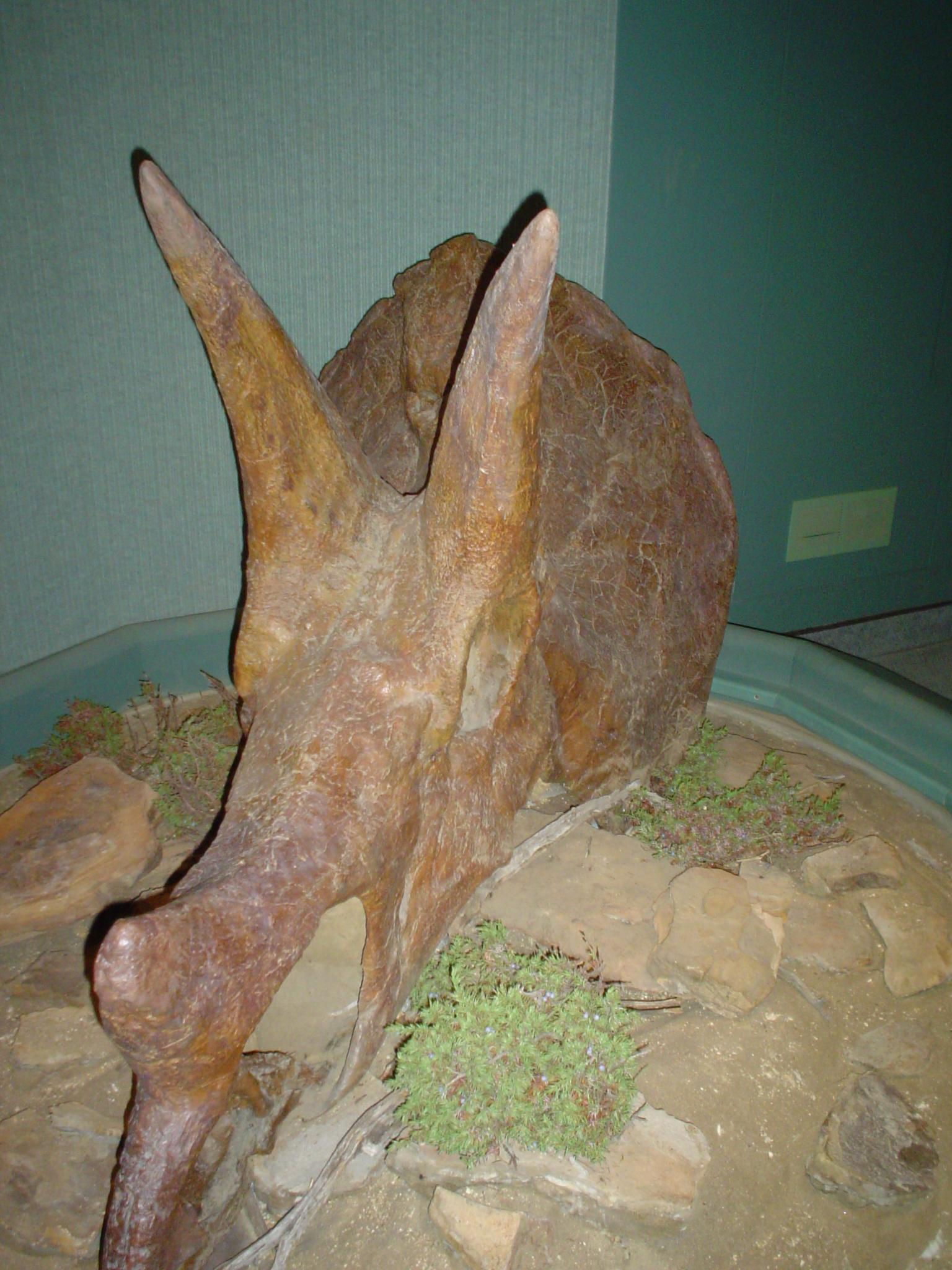
triceratops skull

=== RCMP displays ===
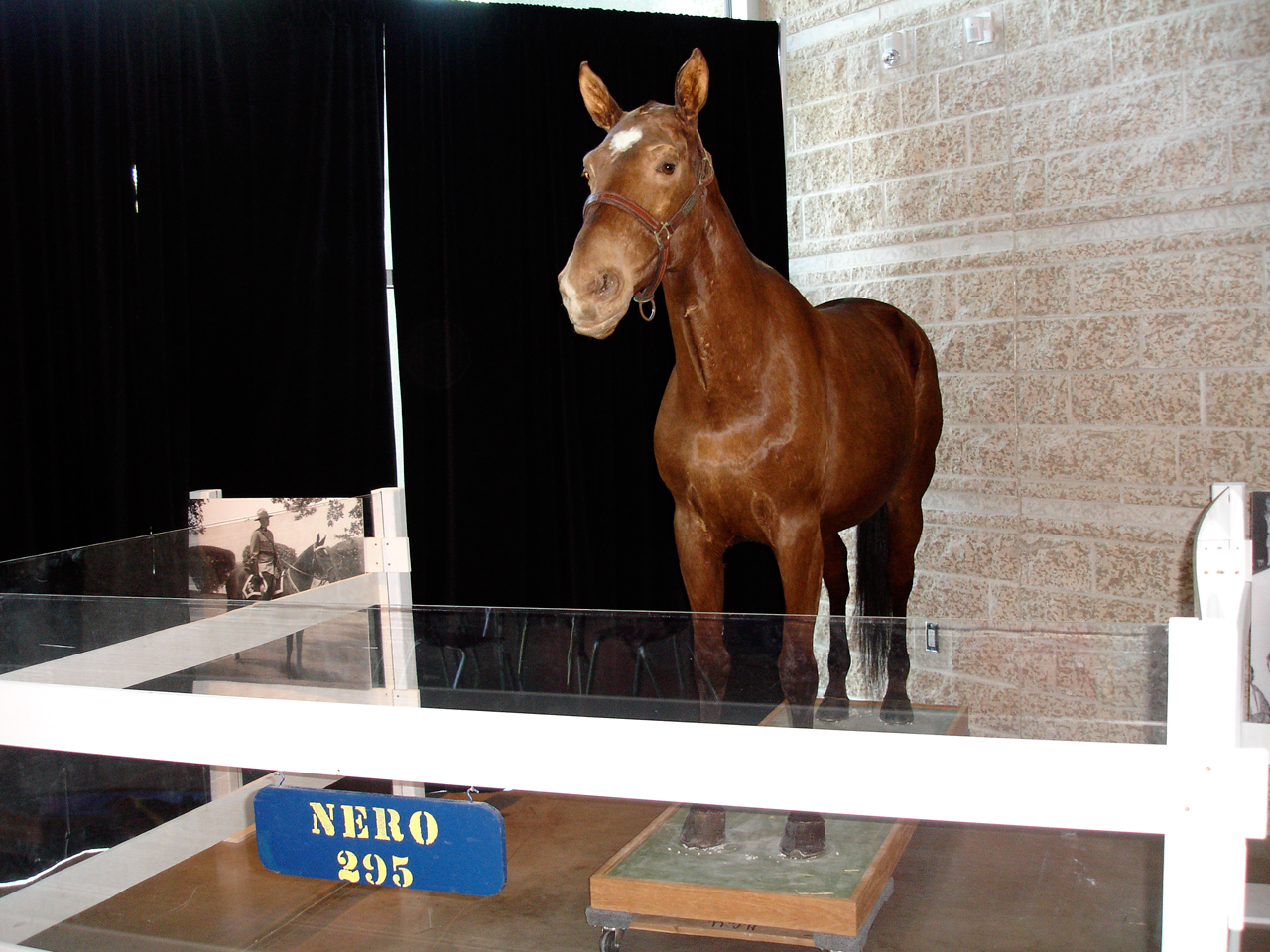
Nero was a horse in the RCMP's Musical Ride. After his death, he was stuffed by a taxidermist and put on display at the museum.

=== First Nations Displays ===
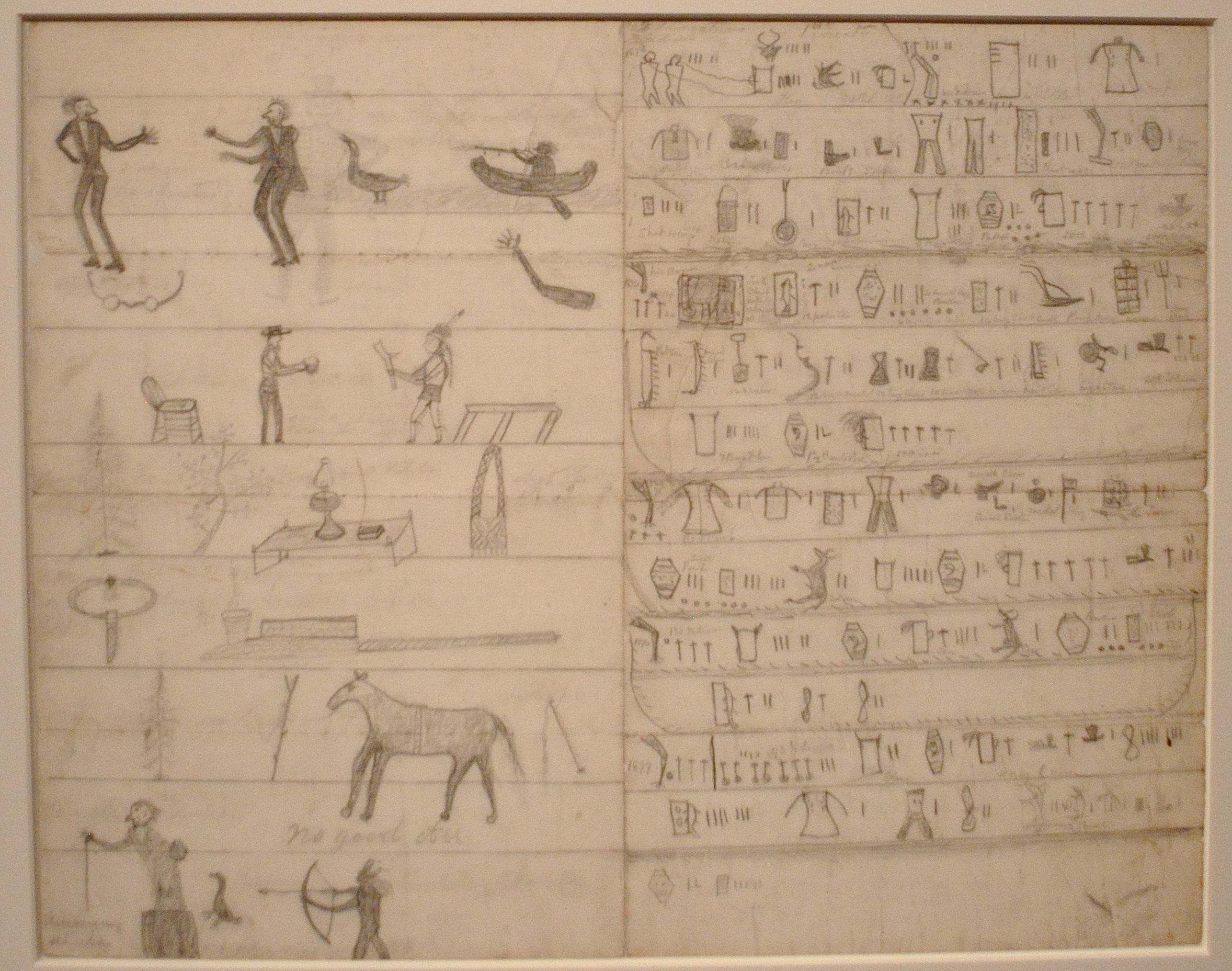
Treaty 4: This pictograph is unique in being the only one of its kind in Canada with respect to treaties between the Crown and First Nations.

== Arms ==
Coat of arms of the Royal Saskatchewan Museum
Adopted 1993 Crest An eagle wings elevated and addorsed Or rising from a coronet of four garbs set on a rim Or jewelled Gules Escutcheon Barry of twelve Vert and Or on a chief indented in the form of poplar leaves Or a medicine wheel Vert Supporters On a compartment of alluvial granite proper dexter a bison sinister a caribou both Or and gorged with a cord of ancient beads Gules pendant therefrom by its bow a key Sable Motto SERVING THROUGH STEWARDSHIP Banner Vert a chief or over all the arms of the Royal Saskatchewan Museum with a border counterchanged
