= Rural Municipality of White Valley No. 49 =

Rural municipality in Saskatchewan, Canada

White Valley No. 49
- Rural municipality
- Rural Municipality of White Valley No. 49
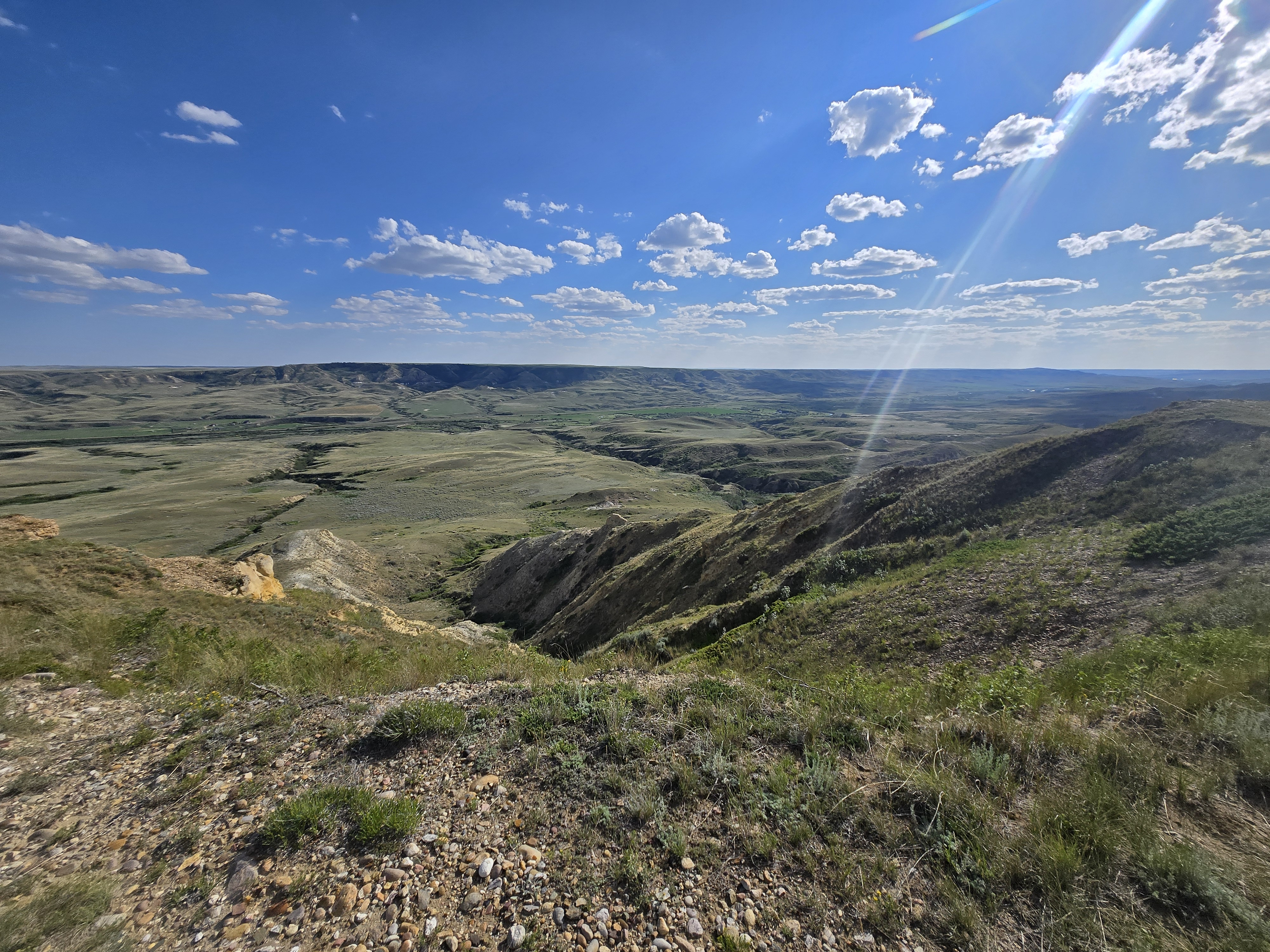
- The Frenchman River Valley viewed from Jones Peak

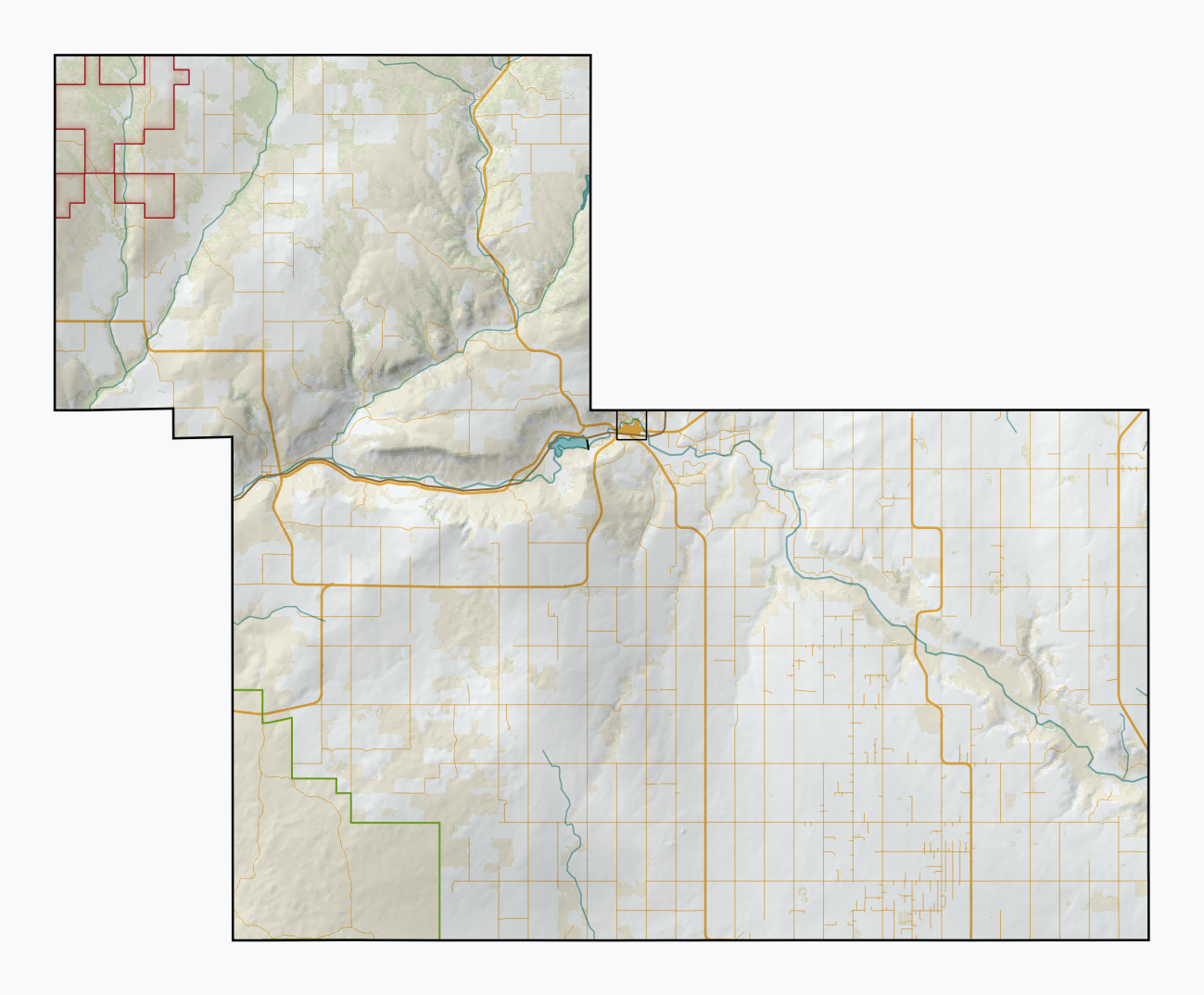

- Location of the RM of White Valley No. 49 in Saskatchewan
- Coordinates: 49.601°N 109.072°W
- Country: Canada
- Province: Saskatchewan
- Census division: 4
- SARM division: 3
- Federal riding: Cypress Hills—Grasslands
- Provincial riding: Cypress Hills
- Formed: January 1, 1913

Government
  - Reeve: James Leroy
  - Governing body: RM of White Valley No. 49 Council
  - Administrator: Tracey Schacher
  - Office location: Eastend

Area (2016)
  - Land: 2,026.88 km^{2} (782.58 sq mi)

Population (2021)
  - Total: 352
  - Density: 0.2/km^{2} (0.52/sq mi)
- Time zone: CST
  - Summer (DST): CST
- Postal code: S0N 0T0
- Area codes: 306 and 639
- Highway(s): Highway 13; Highway 633; Highway 614
- Waterway(s): Frenchman River

The Rural Municipality of White Valley No. 49 (2016 population: 478) is a rural municipality (RM) in the Canadian province of Saskatchewan within Census Division No. 4 and SARM Division No. 3. It is located in the southwest portion of the province near Eastend.

== History ==
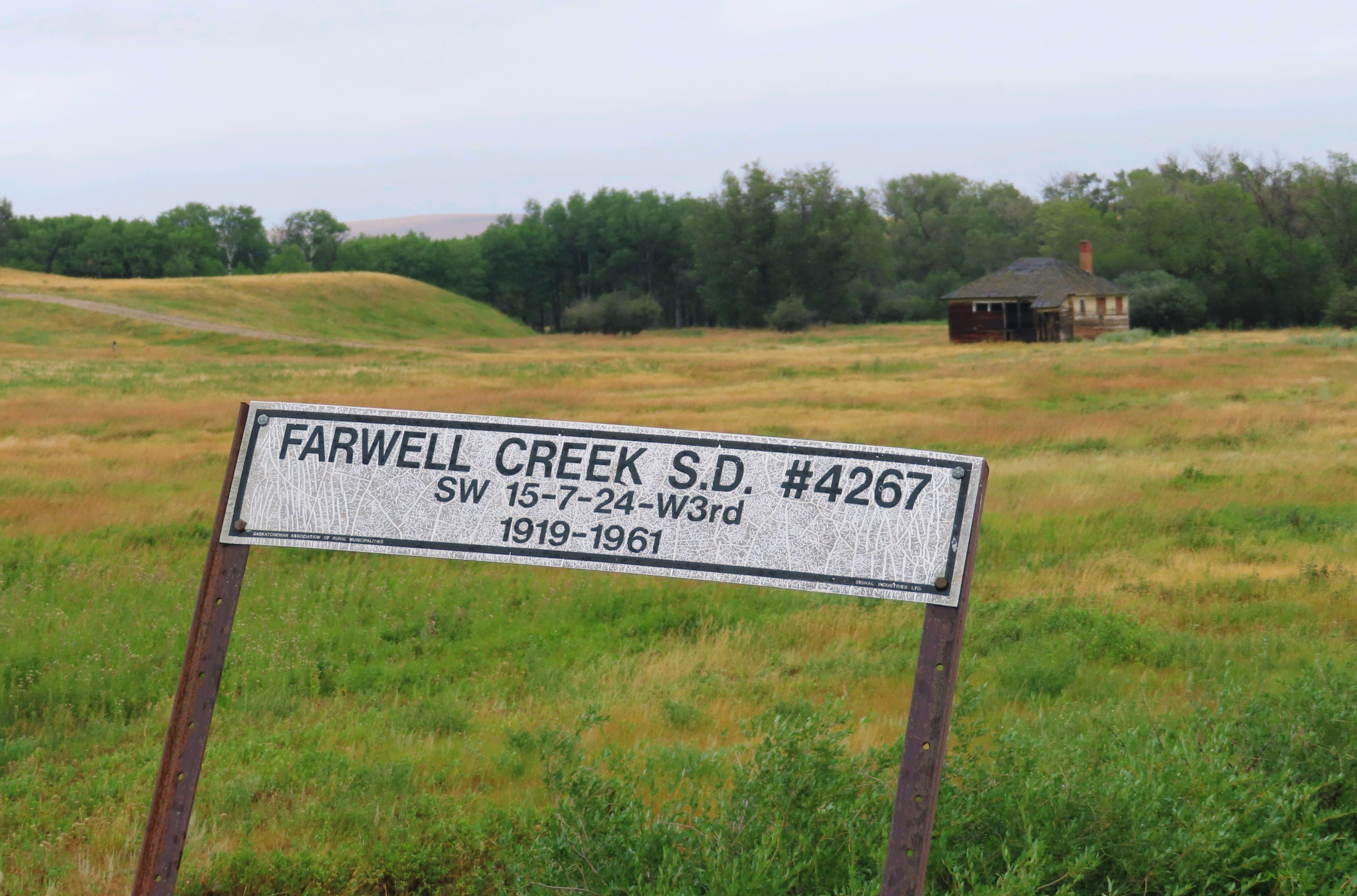
The abandoned Farwell Creek school

The RM of White Valley No. 49 incorporated as a rural municipality on January 1, 1913.

== Geography ==
=== Communities and localities ===
The following urban municipalities are surrounded by the RM.

Towns

- Eastend

The following unincorporated communities are within the RM.

Localities

- Bench
- Chambery
- East Fairwell
- Klintonel
- Knollys
- Neighbour
- Olga
- Ravenscrag

== Demographics ==
Population history (1981–2016)
Year	Pop.	±%
1981	731	—
1986	674	−7.8%
1991	641	−4.9%
1996	615	−4.1%
2001	570	−7.3%
2006	518	−9.1%
2011	478	−7.7%
2016	478	+0.0%
2021	352	−26.4%
Source: Statistics Canada via Saskatchewan Bureau of Statistics

In the 2021 Census of Population conducted by Statistics Canada, the RM of White Valley No. 49 had a population of 352 living in 146 of its 182 total private dwellings, a change of −26.4% from its 2016 population of 478. With a land area of 2,001.56 km^{2} (772.81 sq mi), it had a population density of 0.2/km^{2} (0.5/sq mi) in 2021.

In the 2016 Census of Population, the RM of White Valley No. 49 recorded a population of 478 living in 155 of its 195 total private dwellings, a 0% change from its 2011 population of 478. With a land area of 2,026.88 km^{2} (782.58 sq mi), it had a population density of 0.2/km^{2} (0.6/sq mi) in 2016.

== Government ==
The RM of White Valley No. 49 is governed by an elected municipal council and an appointed administrator that meets on the second Thursday of every month. The reeve of the RM is James Leroy while its administrator is Tracey Schacher. The RM's office is located in Eastend.

== Transportation ==
Highway	Starting point	Communities	Ending point
Highway 13	Alberta Highway 501	Eastend	Manitoba Highway 3
Highway 614	Loomis	Eastend	Piapot
Highway 633	Highway 13	South Fork	Highway 332

== See also ==
- List of rural municipalities in Saskatchewan
- List of communities in Saskatchewan
