= Frenchman River =

River in Saskatchewan and Montana

Frenchman River Whitemud River
- Frenchman River in Grasslands National Park, Saskatchewan

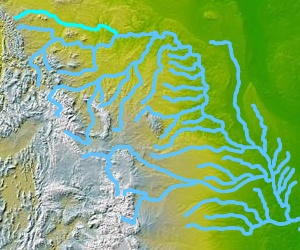
- The Milk River highlighted

- Location of the mouth in Montana Frenchman River (North America)

Location
- Countries: Canada; United States

Physical characteristics
- Source: Cypress Lake
  - location: Cypress Hills
  - coordinates: 49.47641°N 109.39518°W
  - elevation: 975 m (3,199 ft)
- Mouth: Milk River
  - location: Saco, Montana
  - coordinates: 48.517351°N 107.251295°W
  - elevation: 665 m (2,182 ft)
- Length: 341 km (212 mi)

Basin features
- River system: Missouri River

Frenchman River (Gros Ventre: níhʔɔɔtóóúníícááh, lit. 'White person river'), also known as Frenchman Creek and Whitemud River, is a river in Saskatchewan, Canada, and Montana, United States. It is a tributary of the Milk River, itself a tributary of the Missouri and, in turn, part of the Mississippi River watershed, which flows to the Gulf of Mexico. The river is approximately 341 kilometers (212 mi) long.

== Name ==
The origin of the name of the Frenchman River is uncertain, although both Métis and francophone settlers inhabited its banks at the turn of the 20th century. In Montana, it is called Frenchman Creek. Locally, it is often referred to as Whitemud River due to the abundance of white clay in the region.

The Frenchman Formation, a stratigraphical unit of the Western Canadian Sedimentary Basin, was named after the river.

== Course ==
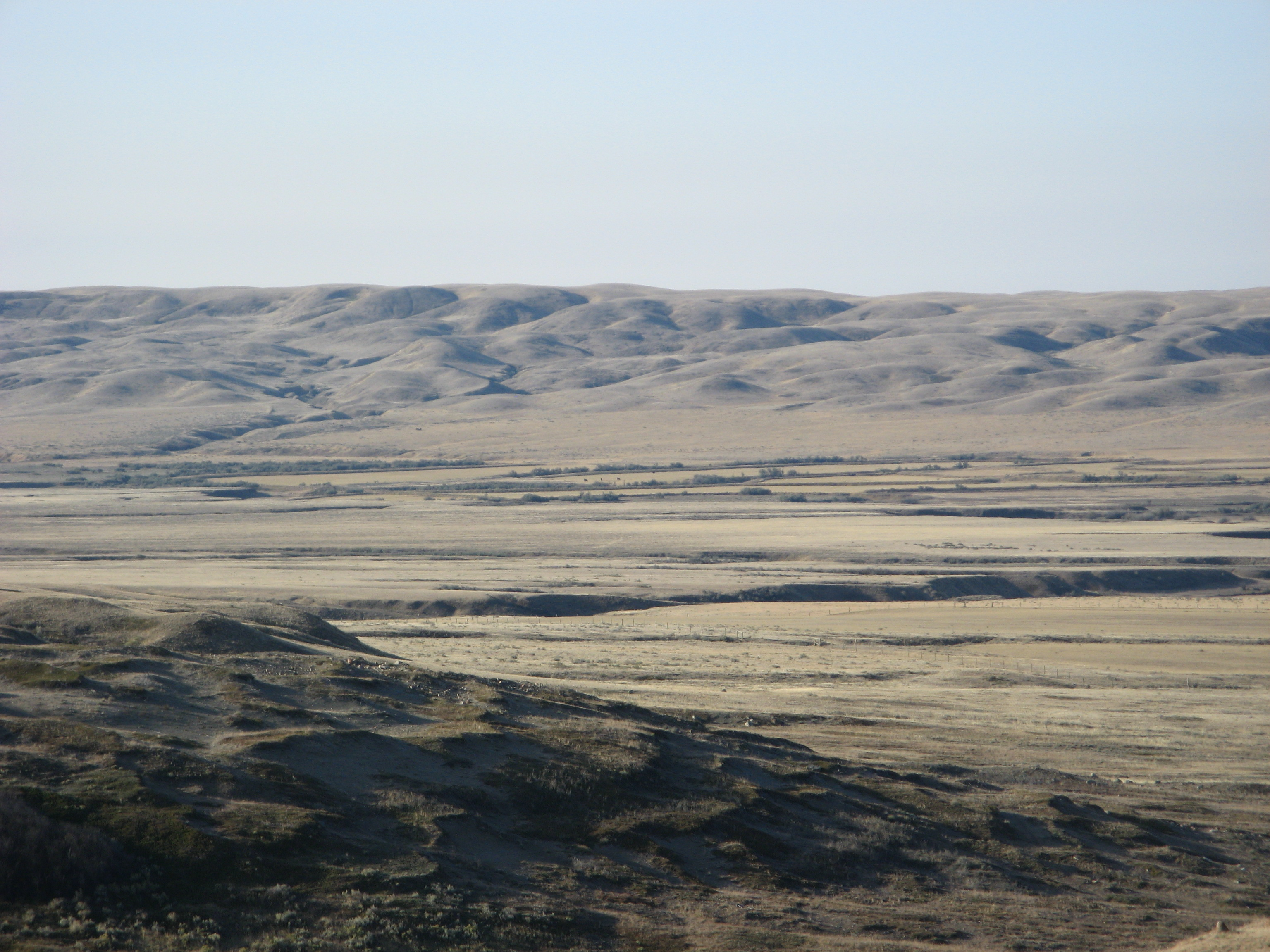
Frenchman River Valley in Grasslands National Park

The headwaters are found in Cypress Lake, in the Cypress Hills, at an elevation of 975 meters (3,199 ft). It flows east towards the community of Eastend, then turns south-east. Various reservoirs are built on its course (Eastend Reservoir, Huff Lake, and Newton Lake) and the river is used extensively for irrigation. The river becomes meandered as it flows through the Grasslands National Park. Several creeks, such as Breed Creek, Little Breed Creek, and Otter Creek, flow into the Frenchman River from the Wood Mountain Hills. After the national park and the hills, the river turns south into Montana, where it flows into the Milk River, in Phillips County, Montana, north of Saco.

== Fish species ==
Fish species found in the Frenchman River include walleye, yellow perch, northern pike, burbot, common carp, white sucker, and shorthead redhorse.

== See also ==
- List of rivers of Montana
- List of rivers of Saskatchewan
- List of tributaries of the Missouri River
