= Dinosaur paleobiogeography =

Field of study in paleontology and geography

Dinosaur paleobiogeography is the study of dinosaur geographic distribution, based on evidence in the fossil record.

== Late Cretaceous North America ==
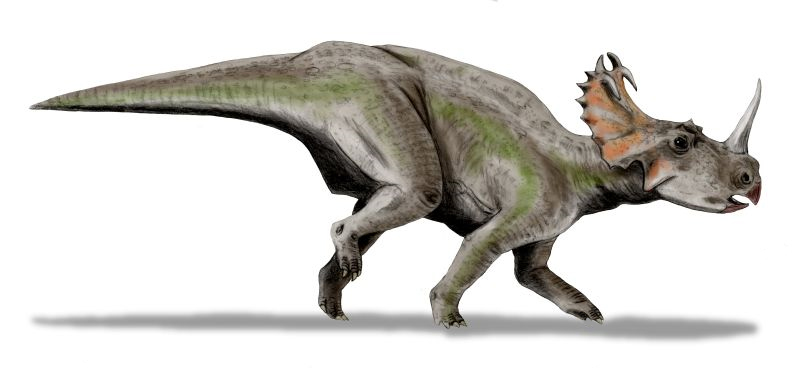
Centrosaurus apertus.

Thomas M. Lehman, in a study of Late Cretaceous dinosaur distribution, concluded that they were "remarkably provincial," with herbivorous dinosaurs exhibiting "persistent latitudinal and altitudinal zonation" in "[d]istinctive endemic associations." Provincialism was even present during the turbulent faunal turnover of the Maastrichtian stage, when the Laramide Orogeny triggered "the most dramatic event that affected Late Cretaceous dinosaur communities in North America prior to their extinction." This turnover event saw specialized and highly ornamented centrosaurines and lambeosaurines be replaced by more primitive upland dinosaurs in the south while northern biomes became dominated by Triceratops with a greatly reduced hadrosaur community.

=== Judithian Faunal Stage ===
Many dinosaur species in North America during the Late Cretaceous had "remarkably small geographic ranges" despite their large body size and high mobility. Large herbivores like ceratopsians and hadrosaurs exhibited the most obvious endemism, which strongly contrasts with modern mammalian faunas whose large herbivores' ranges "typical[ly] ... span much of a continent." Lehman observes that "it is often the most conspicuous and abundant species with the most restricted distributions." He notes that Corythosaurus and Centrosaurus haven't been discovered outside of southern Alberta even though they are the most abundant Judithian dinosaurs in the region. Another example is Pentaceratops, the only known Judithian ceratopsian from New Mexico. In modern North America if one was to sample hypothetical future sites in southwestern Texas, northern New Mexico and southern Alberta, 34 of the 41 large mammal species in the continent could be represented, with the remainder's geographic ranges not overlapping with the sites. Roughly 20 species would be located at each site, but contrasting with the provinciality of dinosaurs, 11-16 species out of twenty would be shared between all three sites. Only the rarer species among modern mammal communities would be able to distinguish different latitudinal zones, and some of these taxa are likely too rare to fossilize. This lack of provinciality is despite the strong temperature gradient. Restrictions in herbivorous dinosaur distribution may be due to foliage preferences, narrow tolerance for variation in climate or other environmental factors. The restrictions on herbivorous dinosaur distribution must have been due to ecological factors rather than physical barriers because carnivorous dinosaurs tended to have wider distributions, especially smaller ones.

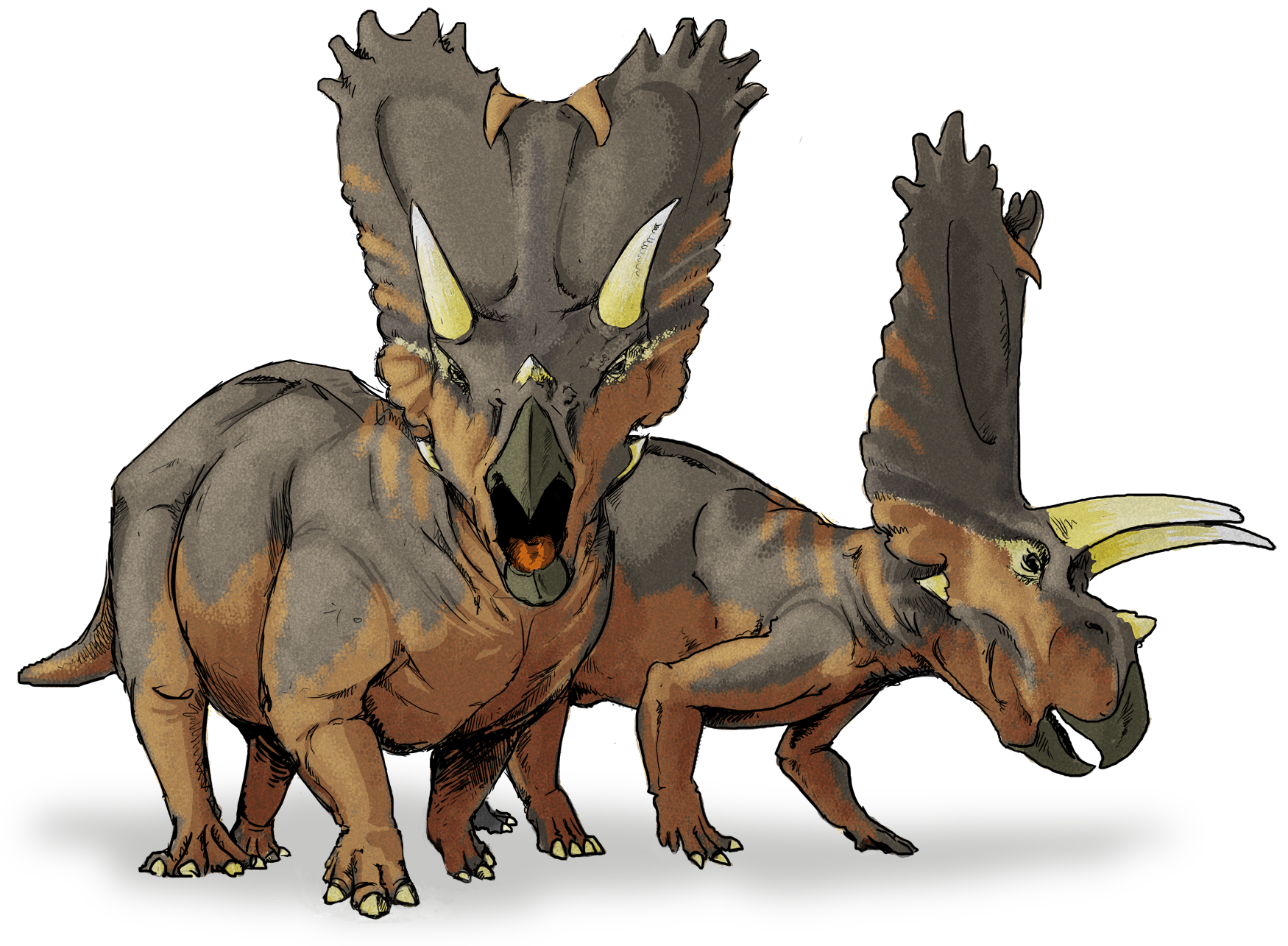
Pentaceratops.

As of Lehman's 2001 paper, restrictions in dinosaur occurrences based on distance from the paleo-shoreline had already been well documented. Vaguely distinguished inland-versus-coastal dinosaurs had been discussed previously in the scientific literature. Terrestrial sedimentary strata from the Judithian to the Lancian are generally regressive throughout the entire sequence the preserved changes in fossil communities represent not only phylogenetic changes but ecological zones from the submontane habitats to near-sea level coastal habitats. Modern life at high elevations in lower altitudes resembles life at low elevation in higher latitudes. There may be parallels to this phenomenon in Cretaceous ecosystems, for instance, Pachyrhinosaurus is found in both Alaska and upland environments in southern Alberta. Northern and Southern animal biomes approximately correspond respectively with the Aquillapollenites and Normapolles palynofloral provinces.

Dinosaur faunas of the Judithian age may represent the peak of dinosaur evolution in North America. Hadrosaurs were universally the dominant herbivore of the period and comprised more than half of "a typical assemblage." This was also the period of greatest generic diversity among large herbivorous dinosaurs. Just in Montana and Southern Alberta were ten genera of ceratopsians and ten genera of hadrosaurs. An association between Centrosaurus and Corythosaurus is characteristic of southern Alberta. Earlier research had found that lambeosaurines are less common in contemporary Montanan strata and with different centrosaurs as Monoclonius taking the place of Centrosaurus. Inland environments also differed, with the contemporary Two Medicine Formation preserving an inland fauna characterized by Maiasaura and the early pachyrhinosaur Einiosaurus. Farther south was characterized by lower taxonomic diversity in communities where lambeosaurines were less common and centrosaurs were completely lacking. There Kritosaurus, Parasaurolophus and Pentaceratops are the dominant fauna. The giant eusuchian Deinosuchus is also "conspicuous" in the southern biome. Farther south, in Texas, Kritosaurus predominates. The biomes of the Eastern US may have resembled those of Texas except completely lacking in ceratopsians. Parasaurolophus and Kritosaurus are also present in northern latitudes, so evidently exchange between them occurred, but both are uncommon outside of the southern biome.

In the south, little changes in the transition to the Edmontonian. However, in the northern biome a general trend in reduction of centrosaurines, with only pachyrhinosaurus surviving. Likewise among lambeosaurs, only the single genus Hypacrosaurus remains. Inland faunas are distinguished by a Saurolophus-Anchiceratops association while more coastal areas were characterized by Pachyrhinosaurus and Edmontosaurus. Pachyrhinosaurus occurred as far north as Alaska. "Archaic" elements such as hypilophodonts like Parksosaurus and the "(re)appearance" of basal neoceratopsians like Montanoceratops begin characterizing inland faunas. Lehman described Arrhinoceratops is a likely ancestor for Triceratops.

=== Kirtlandian Faunal Stage ===
The Kirtlandian faunal age of the Cretaceous period follows the Judithian and is succeeded by the Edmontonian. It is Campanian in age and is characterized by the ceratopsian Pentaceratops sternbergii, which lived throughout the Kirtlandian. The geological formations found to date or persist from the Kirtlandian are the Bearpaw, the upper Kaiparowits Formation, the Kirtland, Fruitland, Williams Fork, Fort Crittenden, Ringbone, Corral de Enmedio, Packard, and El Gallo formations, and possibly the lower part of the Cerro del Pueblo Formation and upper region of the Aguja Formation. These formations are exposed in Alberta and Montana, Utah, New Mexico, New Mexico, Colorado, Arizona, New Mexico, Sonora, Baja California, Baja California, and possibly Coahuila, and Texas, respectively.

Two local faunas are known from the Kirtlandian faunal age. The Hunter Wash local fauna was defined as the vertebrates "obtained from the upper 40 feet of the Fruitland Formation and the lower 55 feet of the lower shale of the Kirtland Shale (now a formation) in Hunter Wash (member)." The Hunter Wash fauna therefore includes all taxa from the Bisti region of the Bisti/De-Na-Zin Wilderness, and the animals from the Fossil Forest and Ah-shi-sle-pah Wash. The Willow Wash fauna was named for all the fauna of the De-na-zin Member of the Kirtland Formation. The majority of the fauna from the Willow Wash were originally thought to belong to the Alamo Wash local fauna of the Ojo Alamo Formation, until it was found that the entire fauna was in fact from the older Kirtland Formation.

The Kirtland and Fruitland formations both consist of the major formations in the Kirtlandian age. The Fruitland Formation measures 97 to 107 metres (318 to 351 ft) thick, and with the 594 metres (1,949 ft) of the Kirtland Formation, the Kirtlandian consists of 701 metres (2,300 ft) of sediments. The rock types within the formations are primarily coal beds, but also include sandstone, siltstone, mudstone, and shale. Within the sediments with a Kirtlandian age, two local faunas, the Hunter Wash local fauna, and the Willow Wash local fauna, have been identified. The currently accepted date of the Kirtlandian is 74.8 to 72.8 million years ago.

The lithology of the Kirtlandian formations are made up of mostly a combination of coal beds. The Fruitland Formation consists entirely of them, and one fifth of all rocks of the Kirtland Formation are a coal. The other common rocks found in the Kirtland Formation are siltstone, mudstone, shale and most commonly, sandstone. The Bisti Bed of the Hunter Wash Member is made up completely of sandstone, which marks the border between the Kirtland and Fruitland formations.

It was first named by Robert M. Sullivan and Spencer G. Lucas in 2003 and found by their original study to date from 74.9 to 72 million years ago. In 2006, Sullivan and Lucas refined their estimate, stating that the Kirtlandian ranged from 75 to 72.8 million years ago. Later that year, Sullivan changed the time range again, finding that the faunal age lasted only 2 million years, from 74.8 to 72.8 million years ago. More precise dating in 2010 by Nicholas R. Longrich found that the second youngest ash can actually be dated more precisely than thought obtaining an error range of 0.18 million years. Longrich also dated the two older ashes, finding a date the same as that of Sullivan.

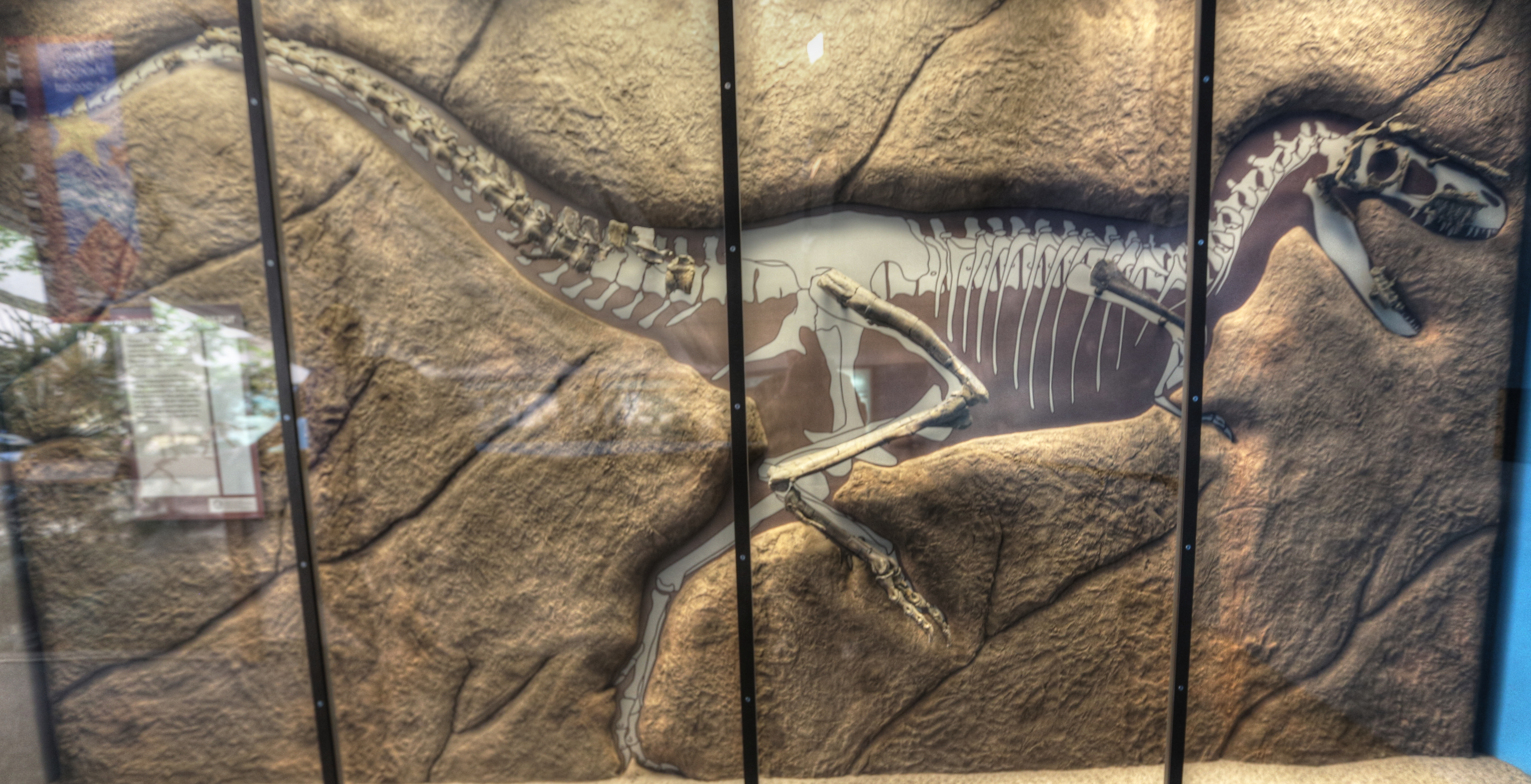
Mounted skeleton of Bistahieversor sealeyi, found in the Kirtland Formation

The Kirtlandian has four species distinguishing it from other ages. The species include the dinosaurians Pentaceratops sternbergii, Parasaurolophus cyrtocristatus, and Kritosaurus navajovius, with the only non-dinosaurian being Melvius chauliodous, a fish taxon.

The two main formations of the Kirtlandian, the Fruitland and Kirtland, were originally included in the older Judithian age, an interpretation superseded with the naming of the Kirtlandian. In 1975, Russell identified five Late Cretaceous land-vertebrate ages, the Paluxian, Aquilan, Judithian, Edmontonian, and Lancian, based on mammal assemblages. Three previously unnamed faunal ages were given names and term "Kirtlandian" was chosen for the gap between the Judithian and Edmontonian. Pentaceratops is distributed throughout all of the San Juan Basin. Outside of the basin, Pentaceratops is well-known, and known with certainty, from the Williams Fork Formation. This means that the formation, along with the Cretaceous formations of the basin, are inside the Kirtlandian.

The Kirtlandian is characterized by a single vertebrate association. The association was identified by Lehman in 2001 and termed the "Kritosaurus - Parasaurolophus association". This association was found to only be present in the later half of the Kirtlandian faunal age, around 73.4–73 million years ago. Another association, this one the "Corythosaurus - Centrosaurus association" is found at the very end of the Judithian, right before the Kirtlandian, between 76.5 and 74.2 million years ago. Another association, the "Pachyrhinosaurus - Edmontosaurus association", was found to date to 70.6 mya, and it used to symbolize the end of the Kirtlandian.

=== Lancian Faunal Stage ===
By the Lancian hadrosaurs are no longer the dominant inhabitant of any province of western North America. Lehman records two surviving chasmosaurs, Triceratops and Torosaurus. Edmontosaurus and the less common Anatotitan are the only known surviving hadrosaurs. Both lack the elaborate ornamentation of their predecessors. In the south the transition to the Lancian is even more dramatic, which Lehman describes as "the abrupt reemergence of a fauna with a superficially "Jurassic" aspect." These faunas are dominated by Alamosaurus and feature abundant Quetzalcoatlus in Texas.

The extreme changes occurring in the make-up of herbivore communities during the faunal turnover suggests that a change in the ecosystems' flora was "the most immediate cause...though perhaps not the ultimate one." The rapid expansion of land and drying of inland climate accompanying a drop in sea level could explain some of the environmental changes occurring Late Cretaceous western North America. The wetland habitat enjoyed by many dinosaurs would have shrunk and fragmented. Since many species had very limited geographic ranges its plausible that some of the fragments would be smaller than the area needed to support the species. However, there's no direct evidence for the shrinking of wetland environments. Lehman contends that the actual area of coastal lowlands within 150m of the shoreline must have actually increased significantly. Further, dinosaurs that inhabited inland or arid environments were among the most prevalent in the Lancian. The Alamosaurus-Quetzalcoatlus association probably represent semi-arid inland plains. In previous research Jack Horner speculated that a rise in sea level during the Bearpaw Transgression created selective pressure as coastal lowlands were swallowed up the sea, resulting in anagenesis. If the geographic range of some dinosaur species were truly as limited as the fossil record suggests, then a rapid rise and in sea level could cause intense pressure even the event was local. Additionally, a rapid drop in sea level could allow for "rapid colonization by a few dinosaur generalists." The appearance or reappearance of basal neoceratopsians could be explained by immigration from Asia. Dinosaurs like Nodocephalosaurus resembled Asian forms, and some like Saurolophus co-occurred in Asia as well as North America. Potential Asian immigrants were especially common in upland environments. The appearance of Alamosaurus may have represented an immigration event from South America. Some taxa may have co-occurred on both continents, including Kritosaurus and Avisaurus. Alamosaurus appears and achieves dominance in its environment very abruptly. Some scientists speculated that Alamosaurus was an immigrant from Asia. Inhabitants of upland environment are more likely to be endemic than coastal species, and tend to have less of an ability to cross bodies of water. Further, early cretaceous titanosaurs were already known, so North American potential ancestors for Titanosaurus already existed. Quetzalcoatlus also had precursors in North America and its apparent rise to widespreadness may represent the expansion of its preferred habitat rather than an immigration event. Early Cretaceous deposits in North America reveal that basal neoceratopsian were already present on the continent before their apparent reemergence in the Lancian, so an immigration event from Asia is unnecessary to explain their appearance. The major potential immigrants represent archaic forms that probably wouldn't have directly competed with the disappearing forms anyway. Lehman described the evidence for immigration as a driving force in Lancian dinosaur faunal turnovers as "not particularly compelling."

The faunal turnover may be explained by the descent of more primitive forms existing in upland refugia characterized by conifer-dominated flora into areas that were formerly coastal lowlands as the seas retreated and conditions became more arid.

The decline of mammal diversity in Western North America from the Miocene to present primarily effected large herbivores and occurred over roughly the same length of time as the Late Cretaceous changes, and so may be parallel. They have many commonalities, including the replacement of diversity with single species environments caribou in the north, bison to the south. The most spectacular and specialized forms became extinct. The turnover was preceded by an episode of immigration. Associated with the rapid expanse of terrestrial habitat due to melting glaciars. By contrast, with the mammalian turnovers the newly emerging dominant fauna were clearly old world immigrants, the cervids and bovids.

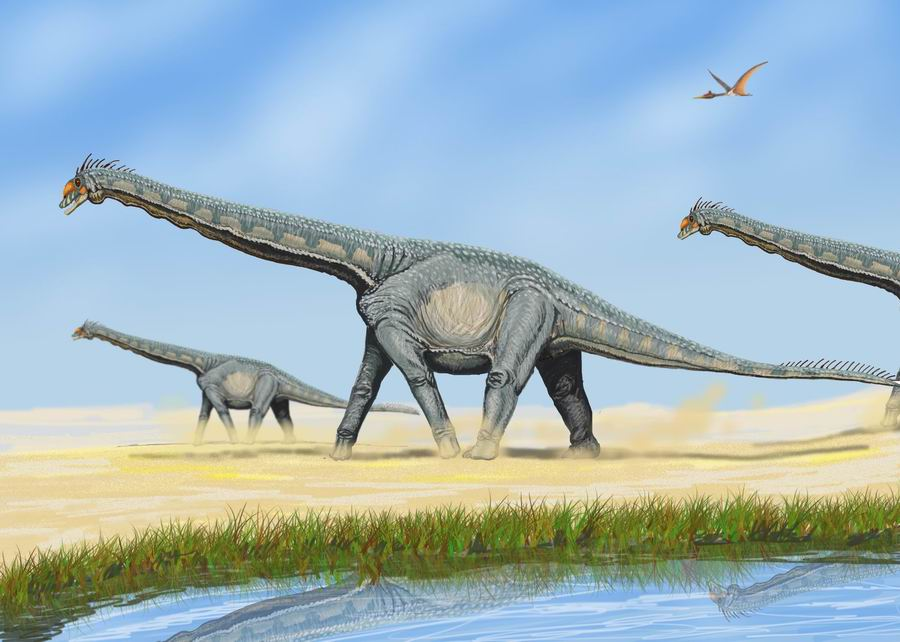
Alamosaurus.

A dispersal event near the Cenomanian preceded the development of endemic northern and southern biomes in Western North America during the Late Cretaceous. Environments with highly favorable conditions led to diverse ecosystems populated by ornate herbivores with complex social interactions. These ecosystems were able to support such diversity because the herbivores had specialized diets that minimized their needs to compete with one another for resources. Migration between ecosystems was probably limited due to the efficient occupation of every niche in these environments. There doesn't seem to have been any physical barrier inhibiting physical travel between the different ecological zones. The widespread prominence of hadrosaurs in these ecosystems may imply that the dominant ecosystem of the time and place were coastal wetlands. Latitudinal zonation was pervasive across these ecosystems and likely arising from similar causes as modern provinciality, which exhibits similar characteristics. Northern biomes were dominated by pachyrhinosaurs and protoceratopsians. Ecological zonation based on altitude seems to be present as well. Lehman speculates that the Judithian dinosaur faunas may represent the "climax" of "individuality" in dinosaur communities. Ecological disturbance brought them to an end during the Edmontonian. Relative sea levels fell very rapidly due to the Laramide Orogeny. Opportunistic generalist herbivores filled the vacated niches that were once filled by a diverse number of specialist forms. The newly formed ecosystems tended to be dominated by a single herbivorous species each. The new dominant herbivores were usually less ornamented and probably represent "survivors from indigenous lineages" rather than immigrants from other areas. Gradually however "relict" dinosaurs such as protoceratopsids and sauropods began expanding into lower altitude areas as sea-levels fell. In the southern biome by Lancian time sauropods had replaced both hadrosaurs and ceratopsians in the southern biome. In the north both were still present although hadrosaurs were demoted to a "subordinate" role in dinosaur ecosystems. Edmontosaurus was the dominant northern hadrosaurid. At the end of the Cretaceous most ecosystems were dominated by a single herbivore. The northern biome was dominated by Triceratops and the southern biome by Alamosaurus. This faunal turnover coincides with the Laramide orogeny and the uplift of the central Rockies. Strata exhibit changes in lithology and the direction of paleocurrents, and a severe drop in relative sea level. At the very least, Lehman argues, the altitudinal life zones would shift, and a change in the distribution of vegetation utilized by herbivorous dinosaurs would have probably resulted. By the end of the Judithian, North America had 7.7 million km^{2} of land area, but by the end of the Lancian it had reached 17.9 million km^{2}, nearly the modern value of 22.5 million km^{2}.
