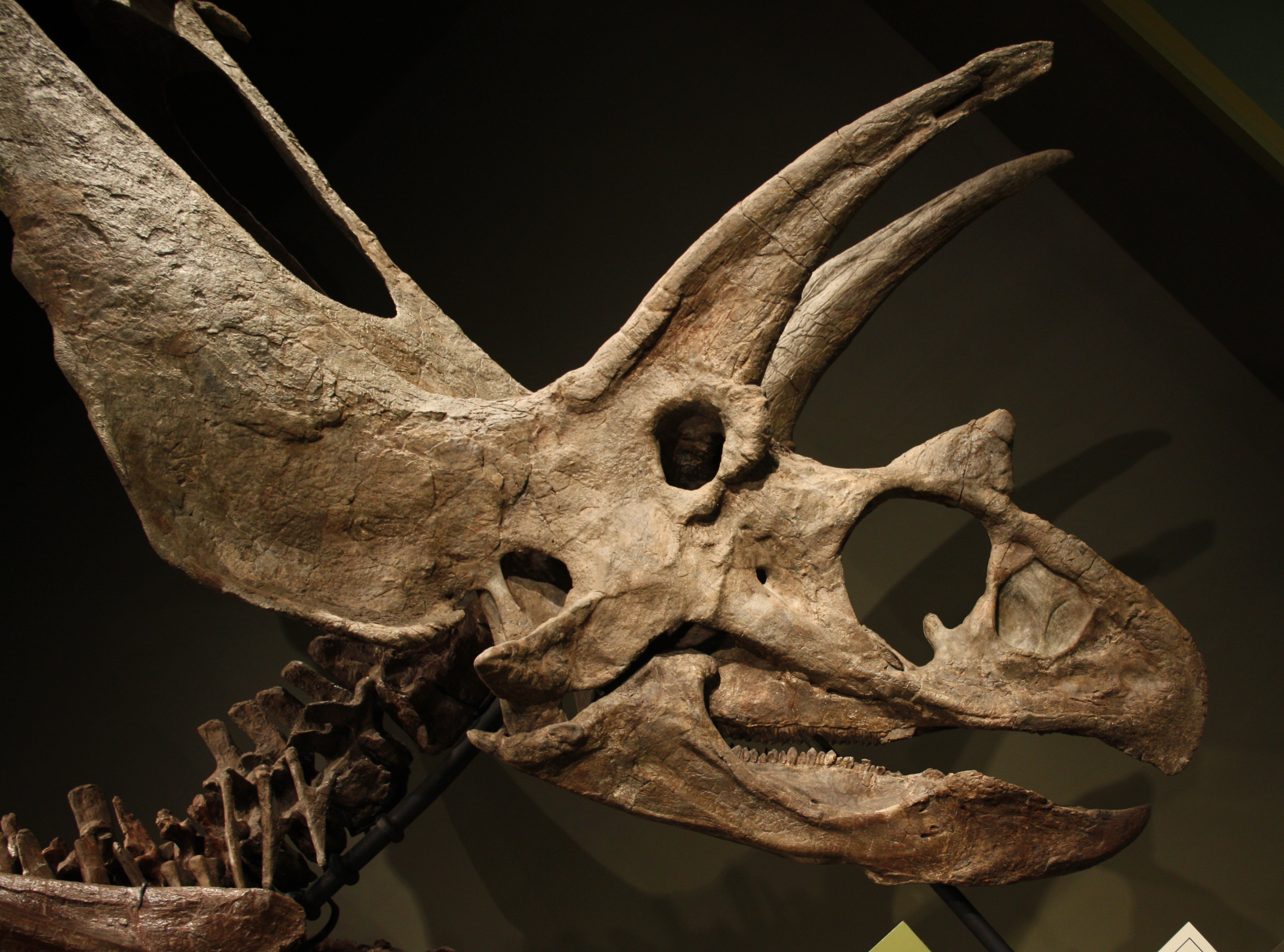
- Closeup of the unrestored region of the skull

Scientific classification
- Kingdom: Animalia
- Phylum: Chordata
- Class: Reptilia
- Clade: Dinosauria
- Clade: †Ornithischia
- Clade: †Ceratopsia
- Family: †Ceratopsidae
- Subfamily: †Chasmosaurinae
- Tribe: †Triceratopsini
- Genus: †Titanoceratops; Longrich, 2011

Type species
- †Titanoceratops ouranos Longrich, 2011

= Titanoceratops =

Titanoceratops Temporal range: Late Cretaceous, 75 Ma

Extinct genus of dinosaurs

Titanoceratops (meaning "titanic horned face") is a controversial genus of chasmosaurine ceratopsian dinosaur that lived in the Late Cretaceous period (Campanian stage, about 75 million years ago) in what is now New Mexico. Titanoceratops was named for its large size, being one of the largest known horned dinosaurs and the type species was named T. ouranos, after Uranus (Ouranos), the father of the Greek titans. It was named in 2011 by Nicholas R. Longrich for a specimen previously referred to Pentaceratops. Longrich believed that unique features found in the skull reveal it to have been a close relative of Triceratops, classified within the subgroup Triceratopsini. However, other researchers have expressed skepticism, and believe Titanoceratops to simply be an unusually large, old specimen of Pentaceratops.

The holotype specimen is OMNH 10165, a partial skeleton including a mostly complete skull and jaws, and much of the skeleton. It was found in either the upper Fruitland Formation or the lower Kirtland Formation. The original quarry is lost, so it is not known which formation the fossil was excavated from. The formations are both late Campanian in age. The skull is incomplete, but as currently reconstructed it measures 2.65 metres (8.7 ft) long, making it a candidate for the longest skull of any land animal. With an estimated weight of 6.55 tonnes (6.45 long tons; 7.22 short tons) and length of 6.8 metres (22 ft), Titanoceratops was comparable in size with the largest ceratopsians, Torosaurus and Triceratops, and was likely the largest animal in its ecosystem, if not in North America, at the time.

== Description ==
Skeletal reconstruction, holotype material in white

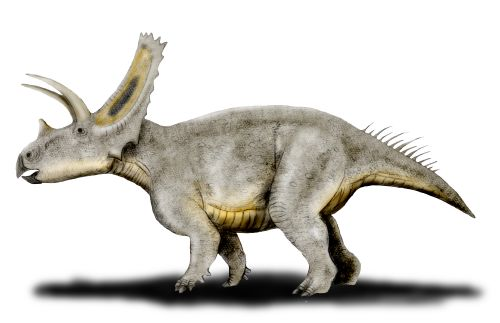
Life restoration

The skull measures 1.2 m (3.9 ft) from the tip of the snout to the quadrate, and the restored frill extends its length up to 2.65 m (8.7 ft) making it a candidate for the longest skull of any land animal. Titanoceratops was as large as the later triceratopsins Triceratops and Torosaurus, with an estimated weight of 6.55 tonnes (7.22 short tons) and a mounted skeleton measuring 6.8 metres (22.3 ft) long and 2.5 metres (8.2 ft) tall at the back. In 2016 Gregory S. Paul gave a lower estimation of 6.5 meters (21.3 ft) and 4.5 tonnes (4.9 short tons). Tom Holtz (2012) noted that it is extremely similar to its closely related contemporaries Eotriceratops and Ojoceratops, which may all be synonymous. The holotype skeleton of Titanoceratops consists of a partial skull with jaws, syncervical, cervical, dorsal, and sacral vertebrae, caudal vertebrae, ribs, humeri, a right radius, femora, tibiae, a right fibula, both ilia, both ischia, and ossified tendons. In total, the amount of material assigned to Titanoceratops means it is quite well known, along with genera like Triceratops, Vagaceratops, Pentaceratops, Chasmosaurus, Centrosaurus, Styracosaurus, and Anchiceratops.

== History of study ==
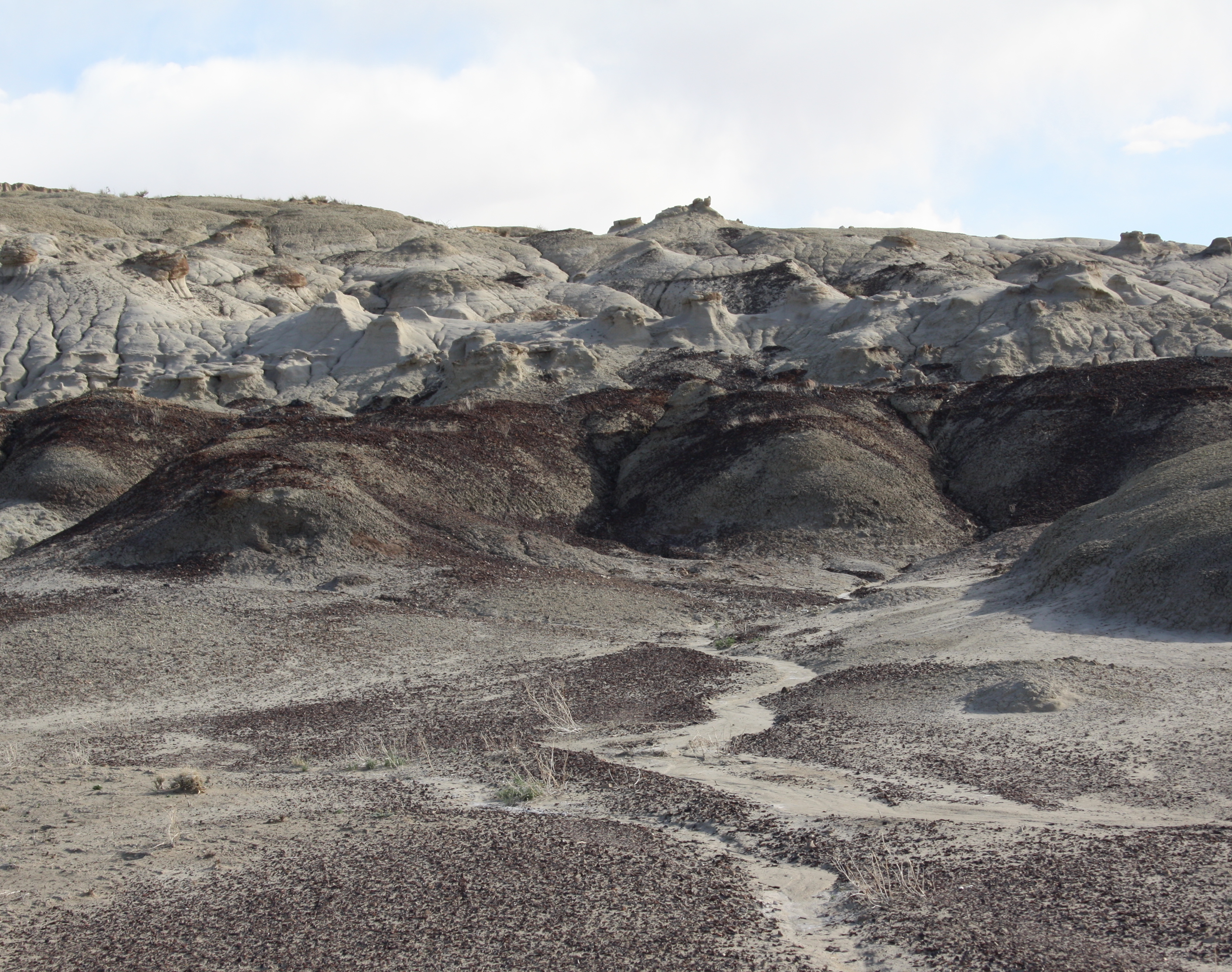
Beds of the upper Fruitland Formation and lower Kirtland Formation in the vicinity of the Titanoceratops holotype quarry

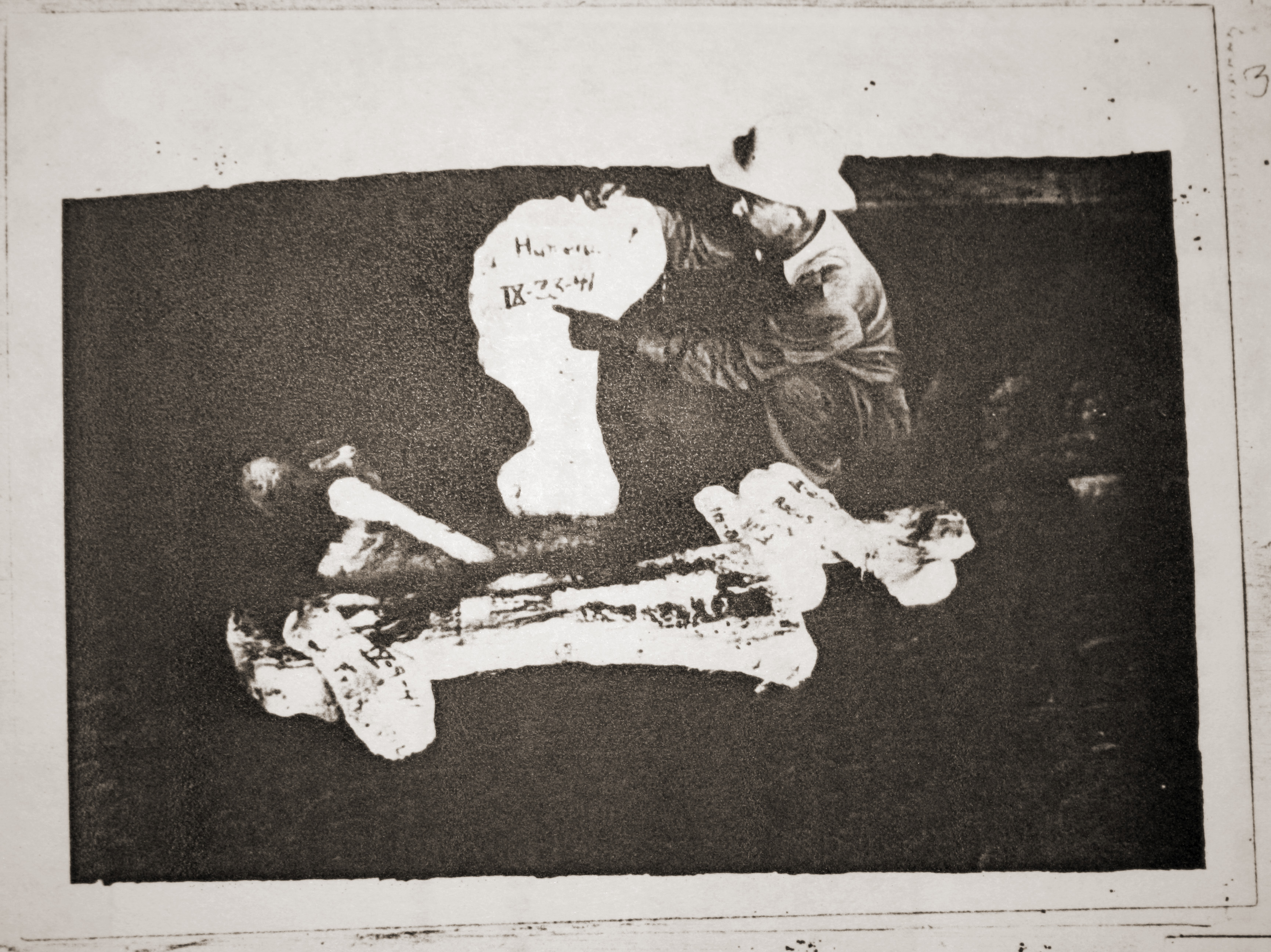
J. Willis Stovall holds up the humerus, 1941

The holotype of Titanoceratops was collected from the upper Fruitland Formation or the lower Kirtland Formation in July 1941, by a field crew consisting J. Willis Stovall, his student Wann Langston Jr., and Donald E. Savage. The precise location of the quarry is no longer known. The holotype specimen consists of most of the fore and hindlimbs, some vertebrae, a fairly complete skull with only one small section of the frill, and partial lower jaws. The bones, being preserved in a fine-grained shale, were crushed and fragile, and so the skeleton was initially considered unsuitable for mounting. Later, however, the fossils were prepared and the skeleton put on display at the Oklahoma Museum of Natural History.

In 1998, the specimen was described by Thomas Lehman as an aberrant and unusually large individual of Pentaceratops sternbergii, previously described from the same area. The specimen was later reinterpreted as a member of the Triceratopsini, the group including Triceratops, by Nicholas R. Longrich and given the name Titanoceratops ouranos in 2011. The name Titanoceratops is derived from the Greek Titan, a mythical race of giants, keras (κέρας), meaning "horn", and ops (ὤψ), "face". The species name ouranos, refers to Uranus, the father of the Titan race. Longrich's re-interpretation would have major implications for the evolutionary history and biogeography of chasmosaurine dinosaurs. Previously, the origins of Triceratops were poorly known. Until the Longrich's re-interpretation of Titanoceratops, Eotriceratops was thought to be the oldest known triceratopsin, and only dated to 68 million years old, from the uppermost region of the Horseshoe Canyon Formation. No Campanian triceratopsins were known, so it appeared as if the group evolved in the Maastrichtian. If Titanoceratops is a member of this group, it would demonstrate that they evolved millions of years earlier than previously thought, and it would imply a five million year long gap in the fossil record and ghost lineage leading to Eotriceratops. However, several subsequent studies have cast doubt on the hypothesis that Titanoceratops is a triceratopsin.

== Classification ==
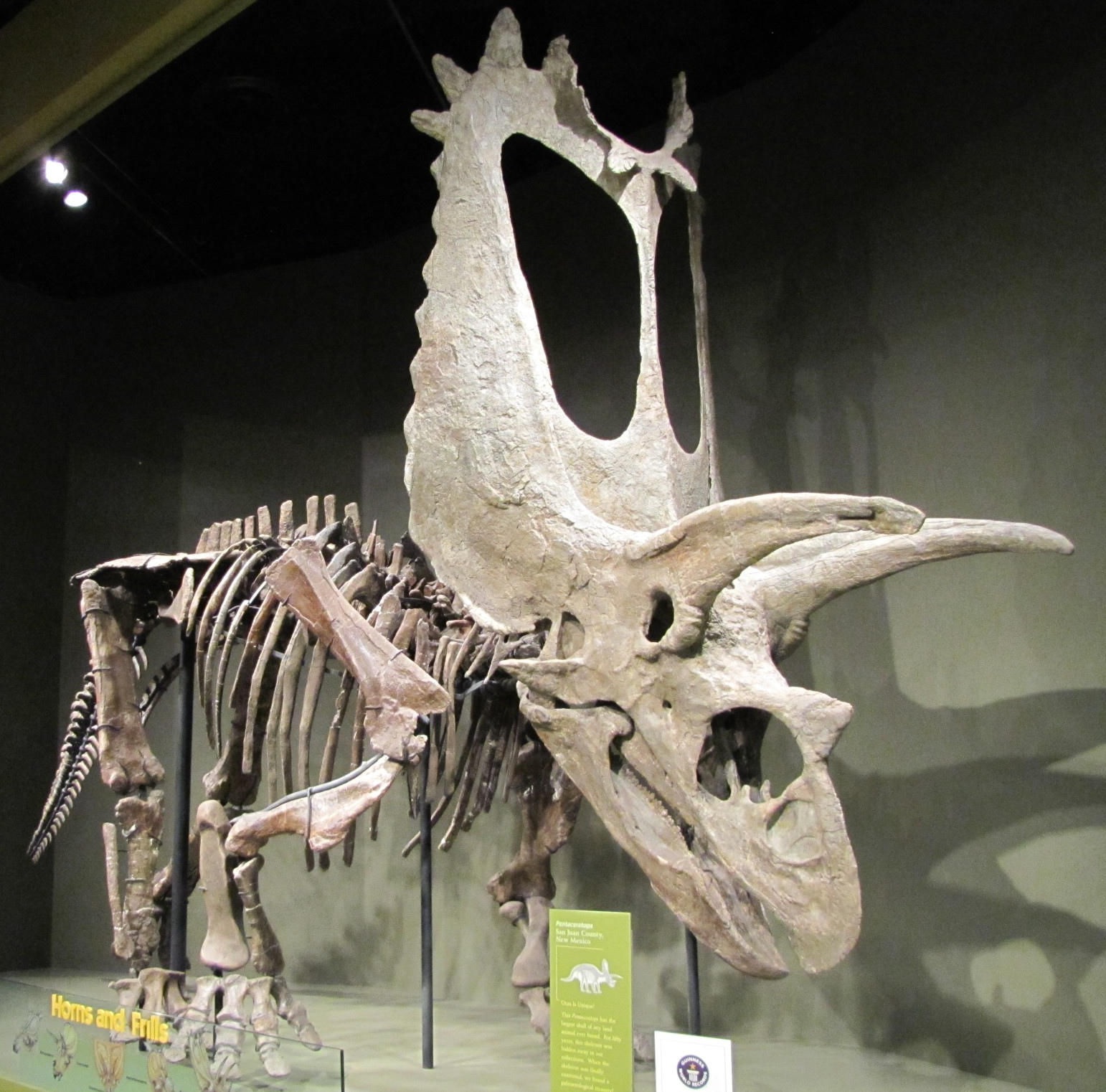
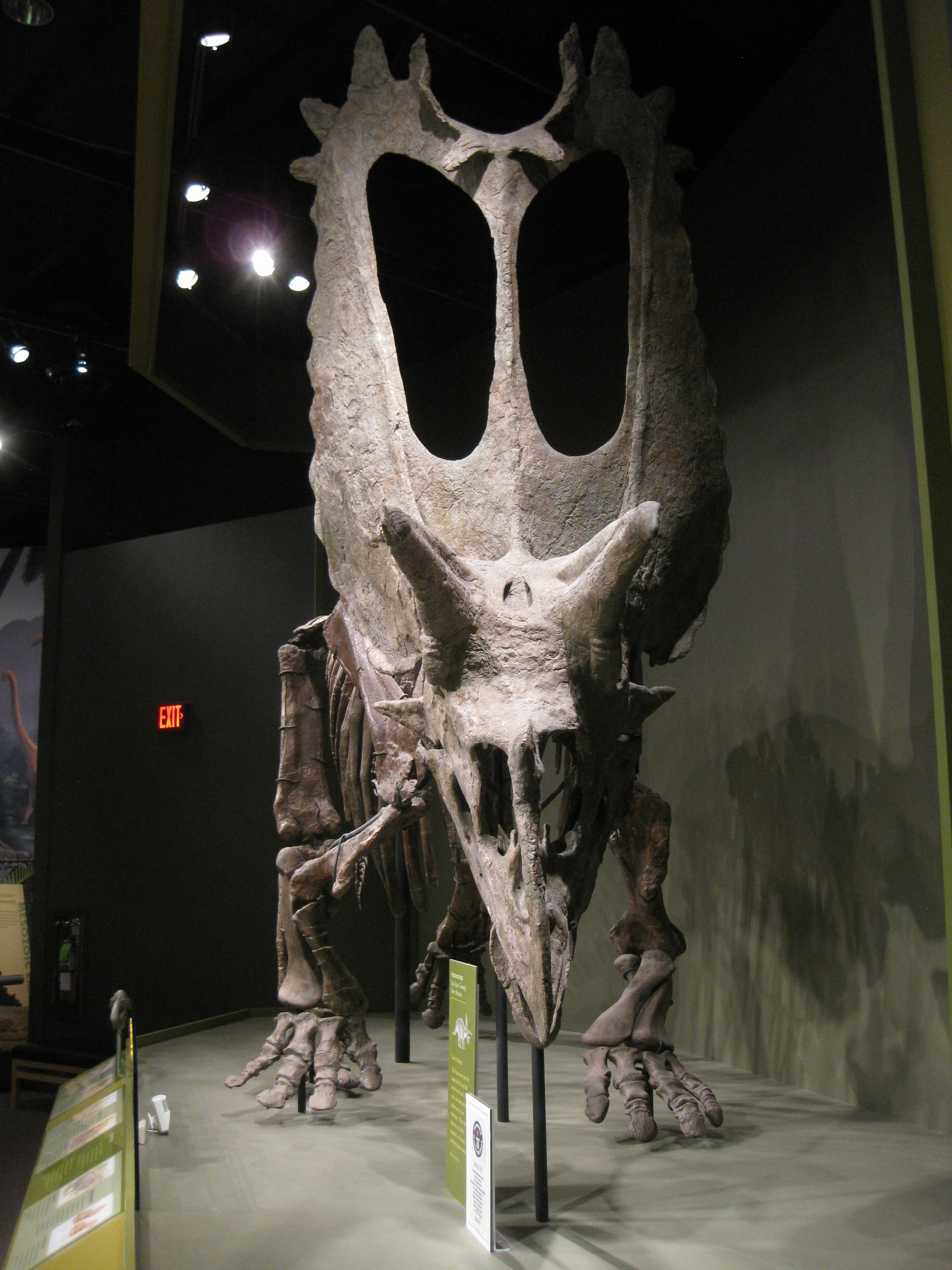
Holotype restored based on Pentaceratops

OMNH 10165 is a particularly large chasmosaurine fossil, which Lehman originally assigned to the genus Pentaceratops, believing that it was a particularly large and old specimen. A 2011 study by Longrich disagreed with this interpretation, concluding that it was actually a distinct genus, which he named Titanoceratops. Longrich interpreted the specimen as sharing more characteristics with Triceratops and Torosaurus than with Pentaceratops, and he named a new group, Triceratopsini, to contain all of them. Longrich used the following features to distinguish the specimen from other chasmosaurines: the possession of thin squamosals (Triceratops); an unsealed parietal fenestrae (Triceratops); an epijugal resembling a hornlike structure (Triceratops); a narrow median bar of the parietal (Triceratops, Torosaurus); a narial strut oriented vertically with a narrow base (Triceratops, Torosaurus); an enlarged epoccipital on the rear end of the squamosal (Triceratops, Torosaurus, Eotriceratops); an extremely enlarged premaxillary fossa (Triceratops, Torosaurus, Eotriceratops); and in lacking a narial process of the premaxilla that is dorsally inflected (Triceratops, Torosaurus, Eotriceratops).

Steven Wick and Thomas Lehman ignored Longrich's reclassification in their subsequent 2013 publication. In 2020, Denver Fowler and Elizabeth Freedman Fowler critically re-evaluated the evidence that Titanoceratops was a distinct genus. They agreed with Lehman's original assessment, that the features in the specimen that appeared unique were likely due simply to advanced age and unusually large size. Pending a full re-evaluation of the specimen by other researchers, they opted to consider OMNH 10165 as aff. Pentaceratops. In 2021, Sebastian Dalman and colleagues recovered Titanoceratops as a member of the Triceratopsini, specifically as a sister taxon of Ojoceratops.

== Paleoecology ==
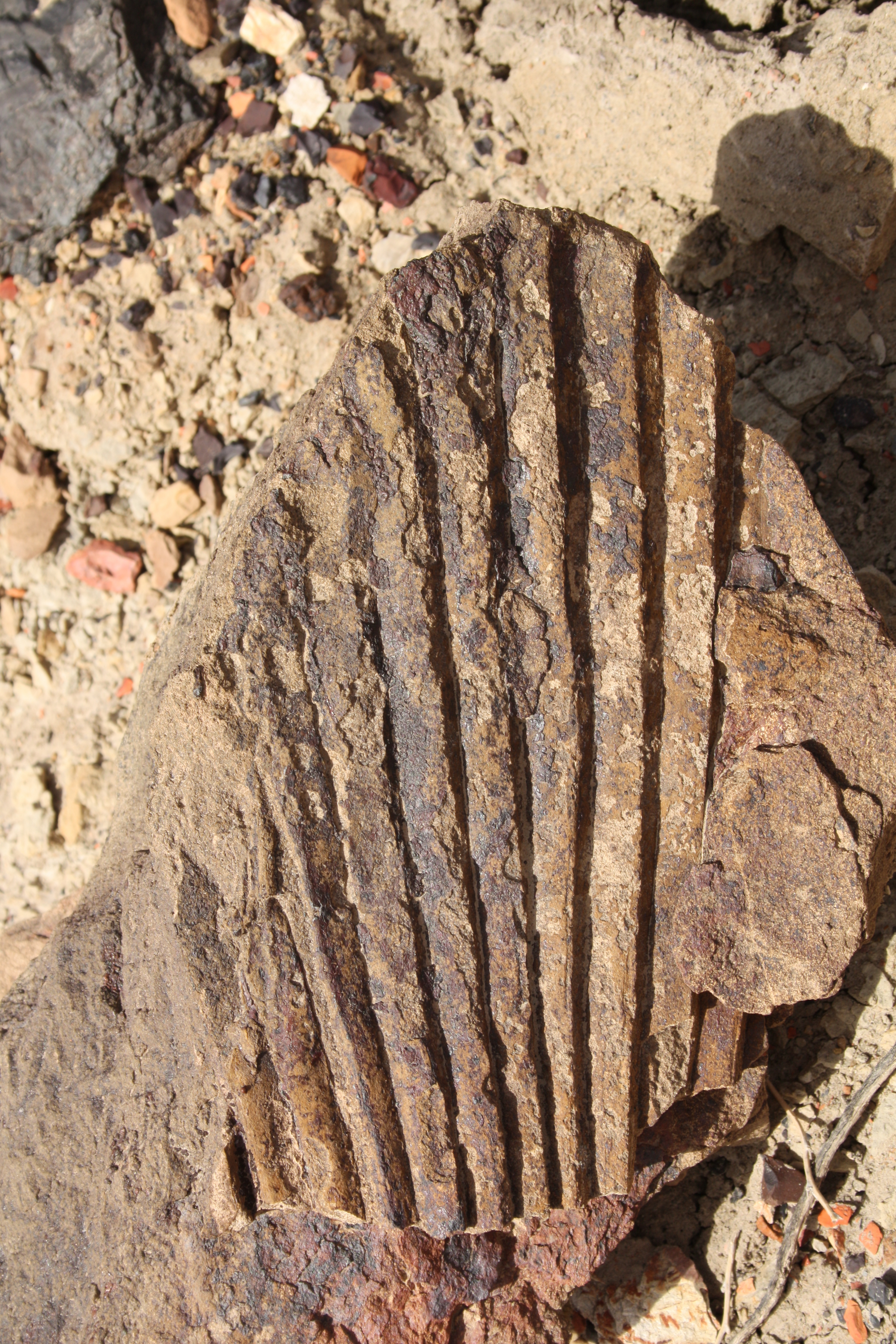
The fossilized leaf of Sabalites, a Cretaceous palm, documents the wet, warm climate that prevailed in Late Cretaceous New Mexico

Titanoceratops is known from OMNH 10165, a skeleton from the lowermost Fruitland or uppermost Kirtland Formation. The Fruitland Formation is about 100 metres (330 ft) thick, and consists of sandstones, mudstones, and abundant coals deposited in a coastal floodplain.

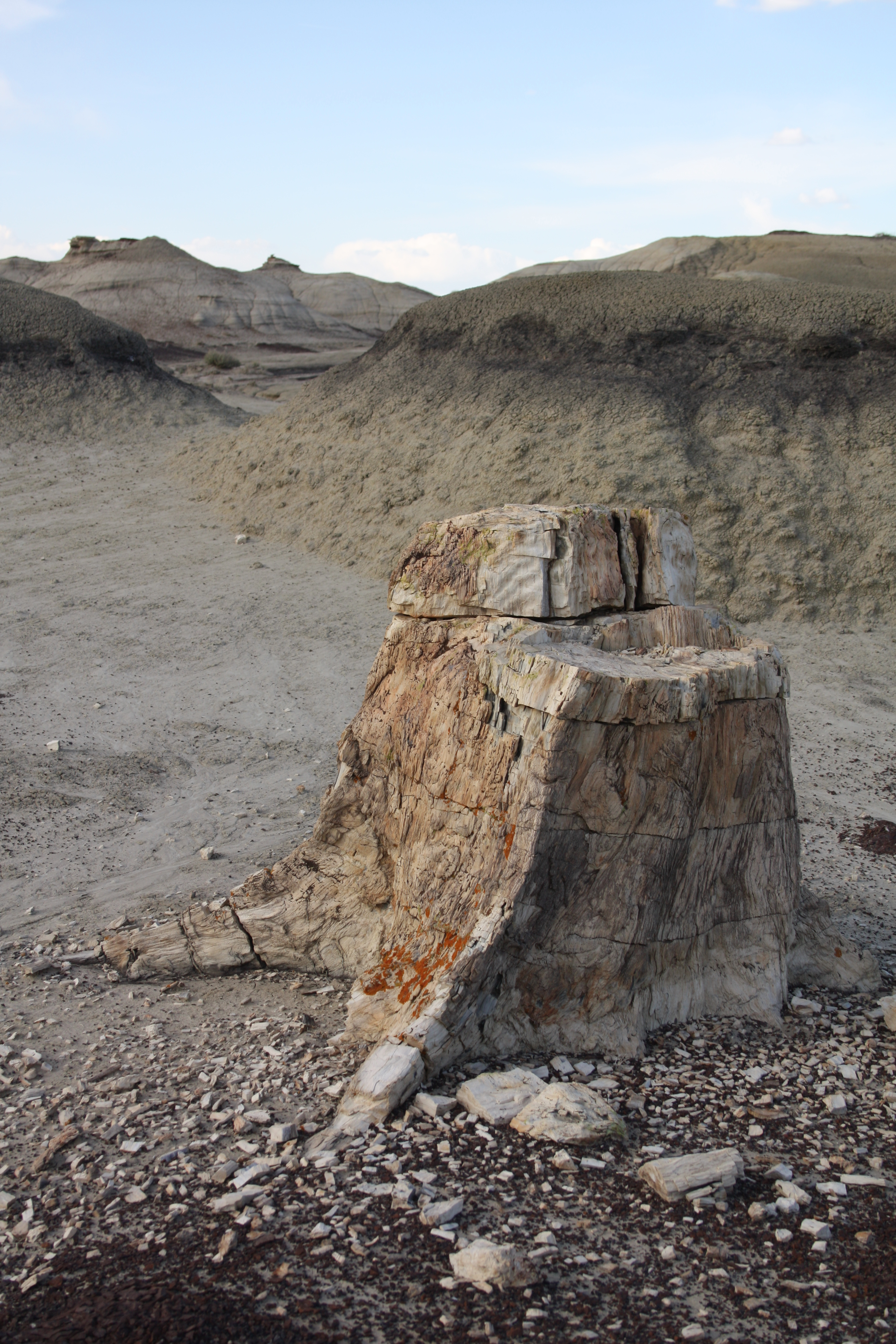
A fossil tree stump from the Coal Creek area where Titanoceratops was found, showing the extensive coal beds of the area

The Kirtland Formation, which conformably overlays the Fruitland, is approximately 600 metres (2,000 ft) thick, and made up of sandstone, siltstone, mudstone, and shale. Both formations are late Campanian in age. The Fossil Forest Member of the Fruitland is 74.11 ± 0.62 million years old, and the Hunter Wash Member of the Kirtland is between 73.37 ± 0.18 and 73.04 ± 0.25 million years in age. The two members combined make up the Hunter Wash local fauna. Therefore, Titanoceratops dates between 74 and 73 million years ago. The age Titanoceratops lived in is called the Kirtlandian land-vertebrate age, and it is characterized by the appearance of Pentaceratops sternbergii.

A moderately diverse fauna is known from the Kirtland and Fruitland formations. Among the dinosaurs known from the Fruitland and Kirtland formations are the theropods Bistahieversor sealeyi (previously Daspletosaurus and Albertosaurus sp.), "Saurornitholestes" robustus, Paronychodon lacustris, and an indeterminate ornithomimid (previously Ornithomimus antiquus); the hadrosaurids Anasazisaurus horneri and Parasaurolophus cyrtocristatus; the pachycephalosaur Stegoceras novomexicanum (previously S. validum); the ankylosaur Nodocephalosaurus kirtlandensis; and the ceratopsians Pentaceratops sternbergii and an unidentified centrosaurine.

Non-dinosaurian fauna include the fishes Myledaphus bypartitus, and Melvius chauliodous; the turtles Denazinemys ornata, Denazinemys nodosa, Boremys grandis, Neurankylus baeuri, Adocus bossi, Adocus kirtlandicus, Basilemys nobilis, Asperideretes ovatus, "Plastomenus" robustus, and Bothremydidae n. gen., barberl; the crocodylians Denazinosuchus kirtlandicus, Brachychampsa montana, Deinosuchus rugosus, and Leidyosuchus sp.; and the mammalians Paracimexomys judithae, Mesodma senecta, Mesodma sp., Cimexomys sp., Cinemoxys antiquus, Kimbetohia campi, Cimolodon electus, Meniscoessus intermedius, Essonodon sp., Alphadon marshi, Alphadon wilsoni, Alphadon sp. A, Alphadon sp. B, Alphadon? sp., Pediomys cooki; Gypsonictops sp., Cimolestes sp., and an indeterminate eucosmodontid.

Titanoceratops supports the idea that late Cretaceous dinosaur faunas were highly endemic, with distinct species found in the Southern Great Plains of New Mexico, and the Northern Great Plains of Montana and Canada. Despite extensive sampling to the north in the Dinosaur Park Formation and Two Medicine Formation, triceratopsins are unknown there. This implies that the triceratopsins originally evolved in the south, then spread north in the Maastrichtian.

== See also ==
- Timeline of ceratopsian research
