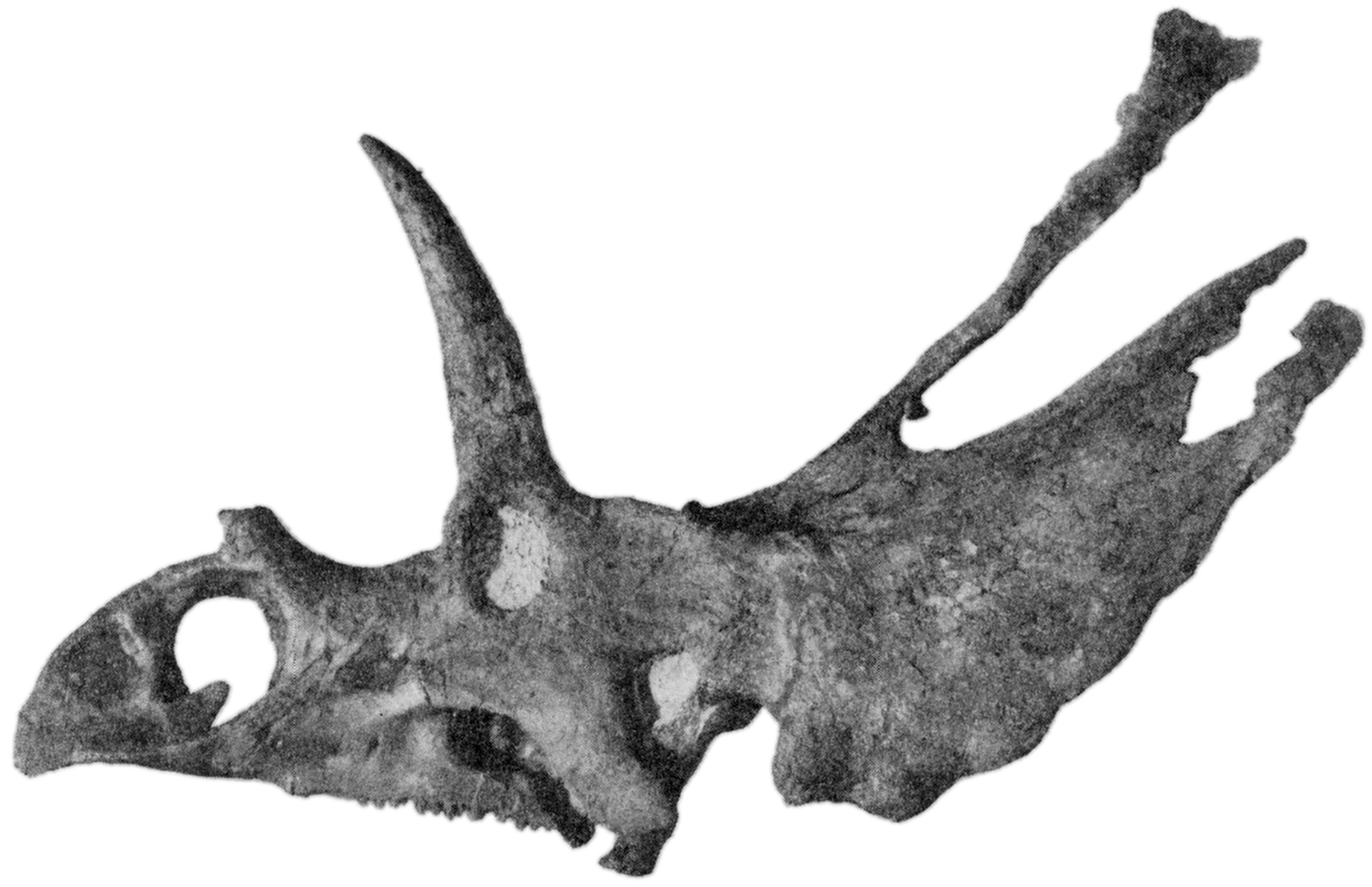
- Holotype skull of P. sternbergii, AMNH 6325

Scientific classification
- Kingdom: Animalia
- Phylum: Chordata
- Class: Reptilia
- Clade: Dinosauria
- Clade: †Ornithischia
- Clade: †Ceratopsia
- Family: †Ceratopsidae
- Subfamily: †Chasmosaurinae
- Genus: †Pentaceratops; Osborn, 1923

Type species
- †Pentaceratops sternbergii Osborn, 1923

Other species
- †P.? aquilonius (Longrich, 2014)

Synonyms
- Titanoceratops ouranos? Longrich, 2011; Pentaceratops fenestratus? Wiman, 1930

= Pentaceratops =

Pentaceratops Temporal range: Late Cretaceous (Campanian), 76–73 Ma

Extinct genus of dinosaurs

Pentaceratops ("five-horned face") is a genus of herbivorous ceratopsid dinosaur from the late Cretaceous Period of what is now North America. Fossils of this animal were first discovered in 1921, but the genus was named in 1923 when its type species, Pentaceratops sternbergii, was described. Pentaceratops lived around 76–73 million years ago, its remains having been mostly found in the Kirtland Formation in the San Juan Basin in New Mexico. Another species, P. aquilonius, was named by Nick W. Longrich in 2014, but it is debated if it belongs to that genus or a separate taxon. About a dozen skulls and skeletons have been uncovered, so anatomical understanding of Pentaceratops is fairly complete. One exceptionally large specimen later became its own genus, Titanoceratops, due to its more derived morphology, similarities to Triceratops, and lack of unique characteristics shared with Pentaceratops.

Pentaceratops was about 5.5–6 meters (18–20 ft) long, and has been estimated to have weighed around 2.5 metric tons (2.8 short tons). It had a short nose horn, two long brow horns, and long horns on the jugal bones. Its skull had a very long frill with triangular hornlets on the edge.

== Discoveries and species ==
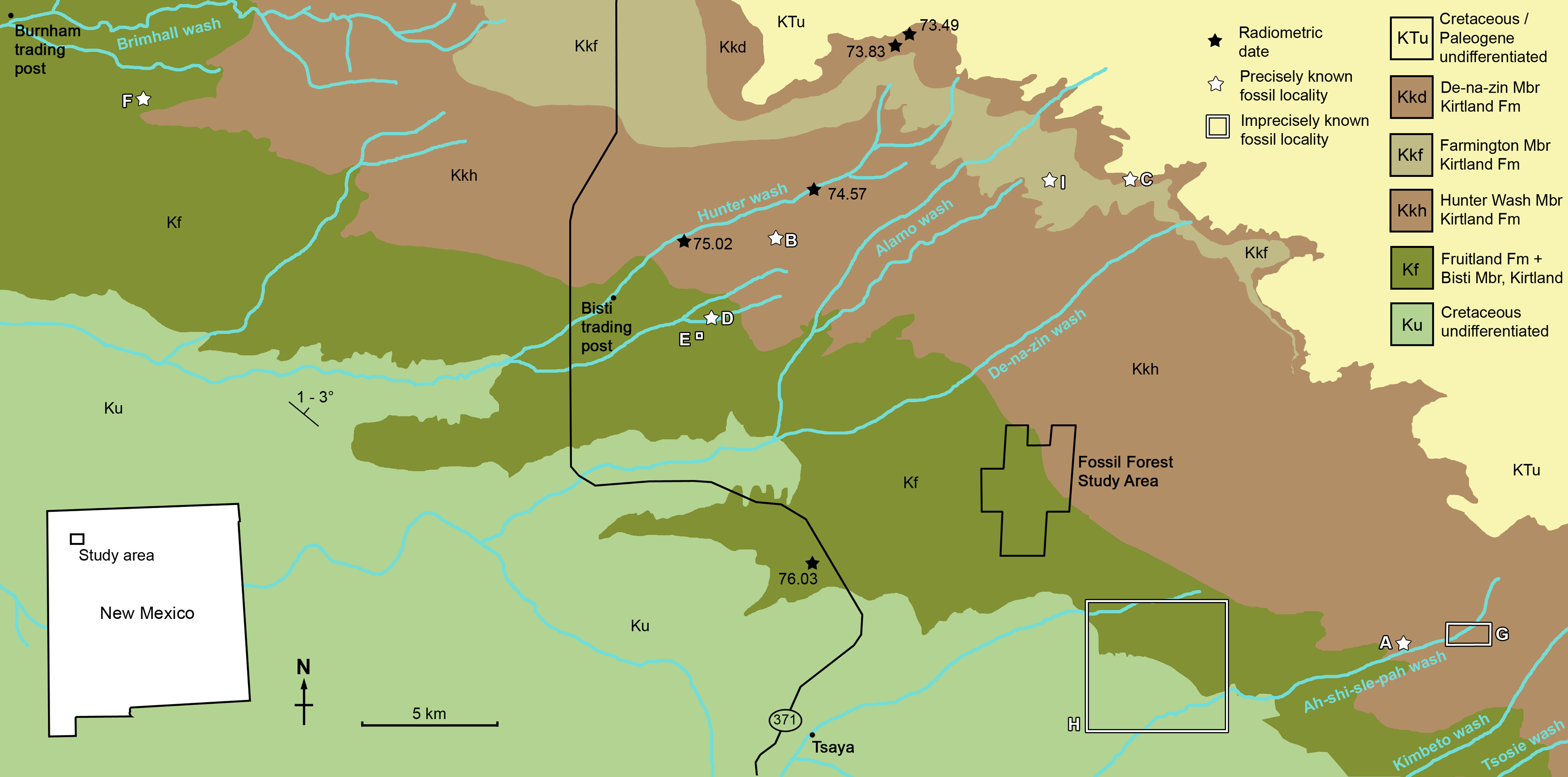
Map of the southeast San Juan Basin; H is the purported collection area of the P. sternbergii holotype

The first specimens were collected by Charles Hazelius Sternberg in the San Juan Basin in New Mexico. Sternberg worked in commission for the Swedish Uppsala University. In 1921 he recovered a skull and a rump, specimens PMU R.200 and PMU R.286, at the Meyers Creek near the Kimbetoh Wash in a layer of the Kirtland Formation. He sent these fossils to paleontologist Carl Wiman. In 1922 Sternberg decided to work independently and began a dig north of Tsaya Trading Post, in the Fossil Forest of San Juan County. Here he discovered a complete skeleton, which he sold to the American Museum of Natural History. The museum then sent out a team headed by Charles Mook and Peter Kaisen to assist Sternberg in securing this specimen; subsequent digging by Sternberg in 1923 brought the total of AMNH specimens to four. The rump of the main specimen was discarded by the museum because it had insufficient value as a display.

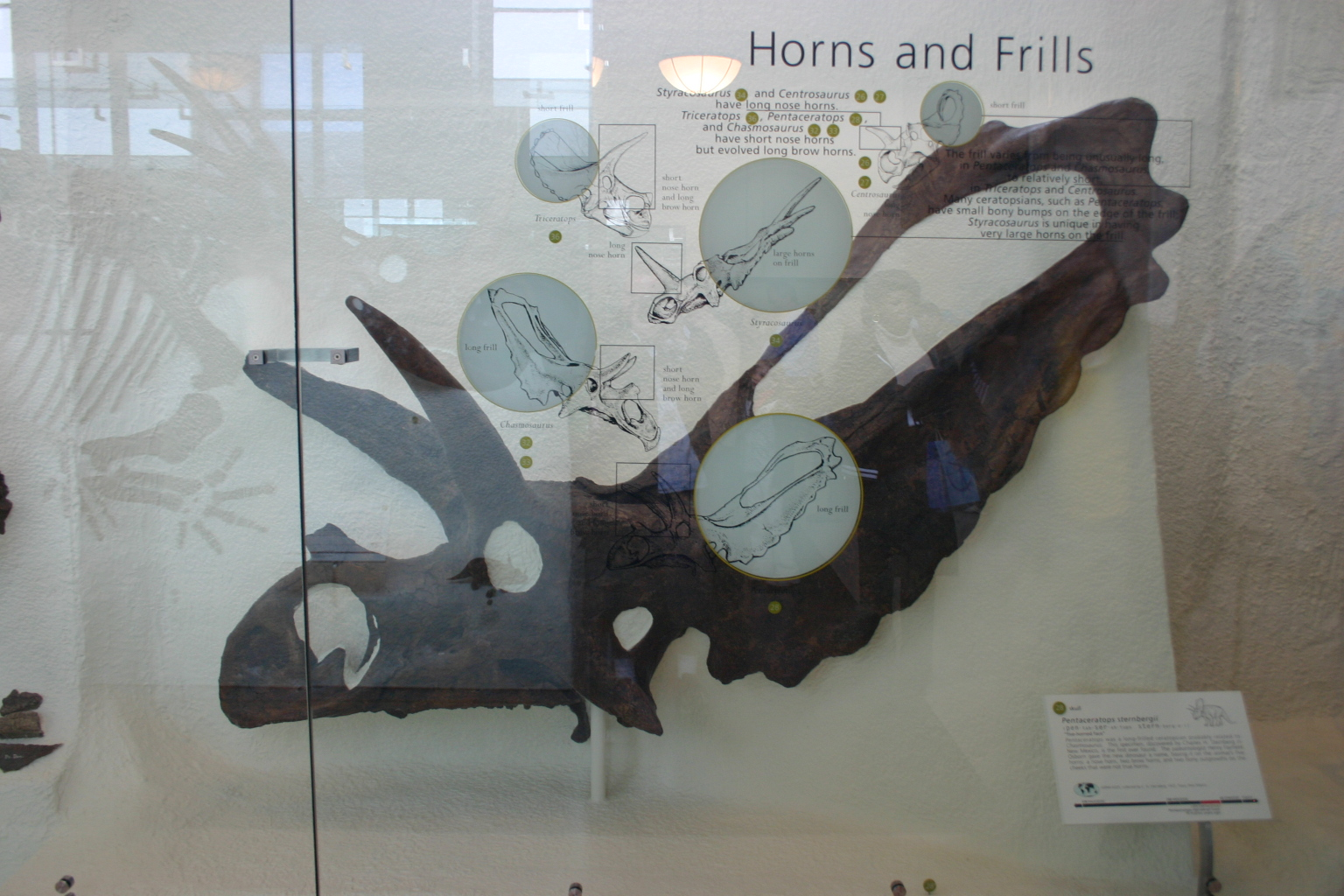
P. sternbergii holotype skull with reconstructed parts, AMNH

The species was named and described by Henry Fairfield Osborn in 1923, as Pentaceratops sternbergii. The generic name means "five-horned face", derived from the Greek penta (πέντα, meaning five), keras (κέρας, horn), and -ops (ὤψ, face), in reference to its two long epijugal bones, spikes which protrude out sidewards from under its eyes, in addition to the three more obvious horns as with Triceratops. Osborn obligingly gave it the specific name sternbergii to honor its discoverer. The name had been suggested to Osborn by William Diller Matthew; the specific epithet served as a consolation to the almost bankrupt Sternberg whose 1923 fossils were initially not acquired by the museum that had to use its 1923/1924 budget to process the finds of the great Asian expeditions by Roy Chapman Andrews.

The holotype was the skull discovered by Sternberg in 1922, specimen AMNH 6325. It was found in a layer of the Fruitland Formation, dating from the Campanian, about seventy-five million years old. The other three AMNH specimens were AMNH 1624, a smaller skull; AMNH 1622, a pair of brow horns; and AMNH 1625, a piece of skull frill.

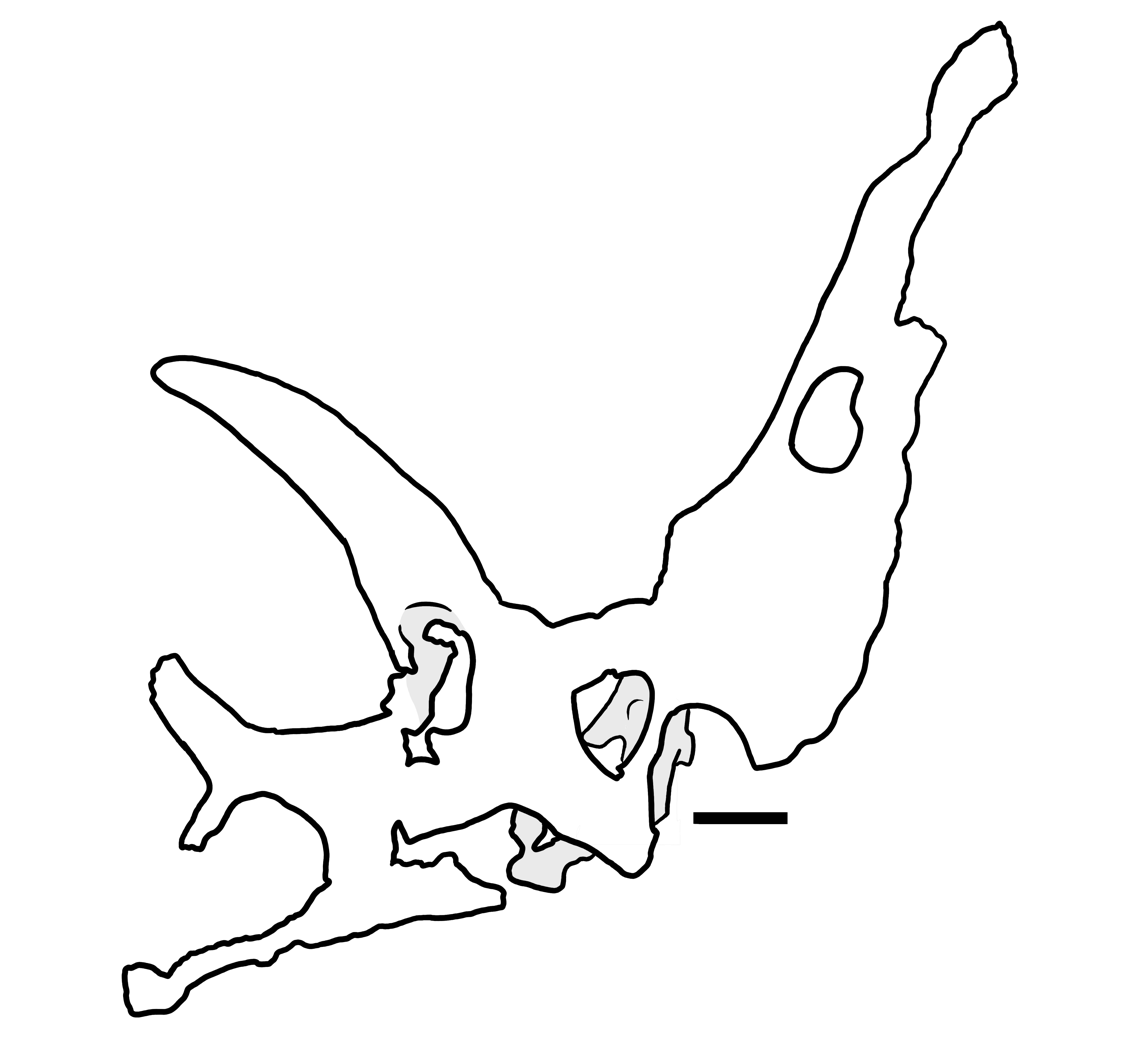
Holotype skull diagram of P. fenestratus

In 1930, Wiman named a second species of Pentaceratops: P. fenestratus. It was based on Sternberg's 1921 specimens, and the specific name referred to a hole in the left squamosal. This was later considered to be the same species as Pentaceratops sternbergii and thus a junior synonym, the hole being the likely effect of an injury. Fowler and Freedman Fowler (2020) considered Pentaceratops fenestratus to be a distinct taxon from Pentaceratops sternbergi. In their opinion, it may be identical to Navajoceratops or Terminocavus, but the state of preservation of the remains makes it impossible to precisely determine the systematics of its owner.

In 1929 Sternberg's son, George Fryer Sternberg, discovered specimen USNM V12002, a right squamosal. Pentaceratops proved to be a quite common fossil in the Fruitland and Kirtland formations. It has even been used as a guide fossil: the appearance of Pentaceratops sternbergii in the fossil record marks the end of the Judithian land vertebrate age and the start of the Kirtlandian. Subsequent finds include specimens MNA Pl. 1668, MNA Pl. 1747, NMMNH P-27468, and USNM 2416, partial skeletons with skull; YPM 1229, a skeleton lacking the skull; UALP 13342 and UKVP 16100, skulls; UNM B-1701, USNM 12741, USNM 12743, USNM 8604, SMP VP-1596, SMP VP-1488, SMP VP-1500, and SMP VP-1712, fragmentary skulls. Apart from the San Juan Basin finds, a juvenile specimen of Pentaceratops, SDMNH 43470, was found in the Williams Fork Formation of Colorado in 2006.

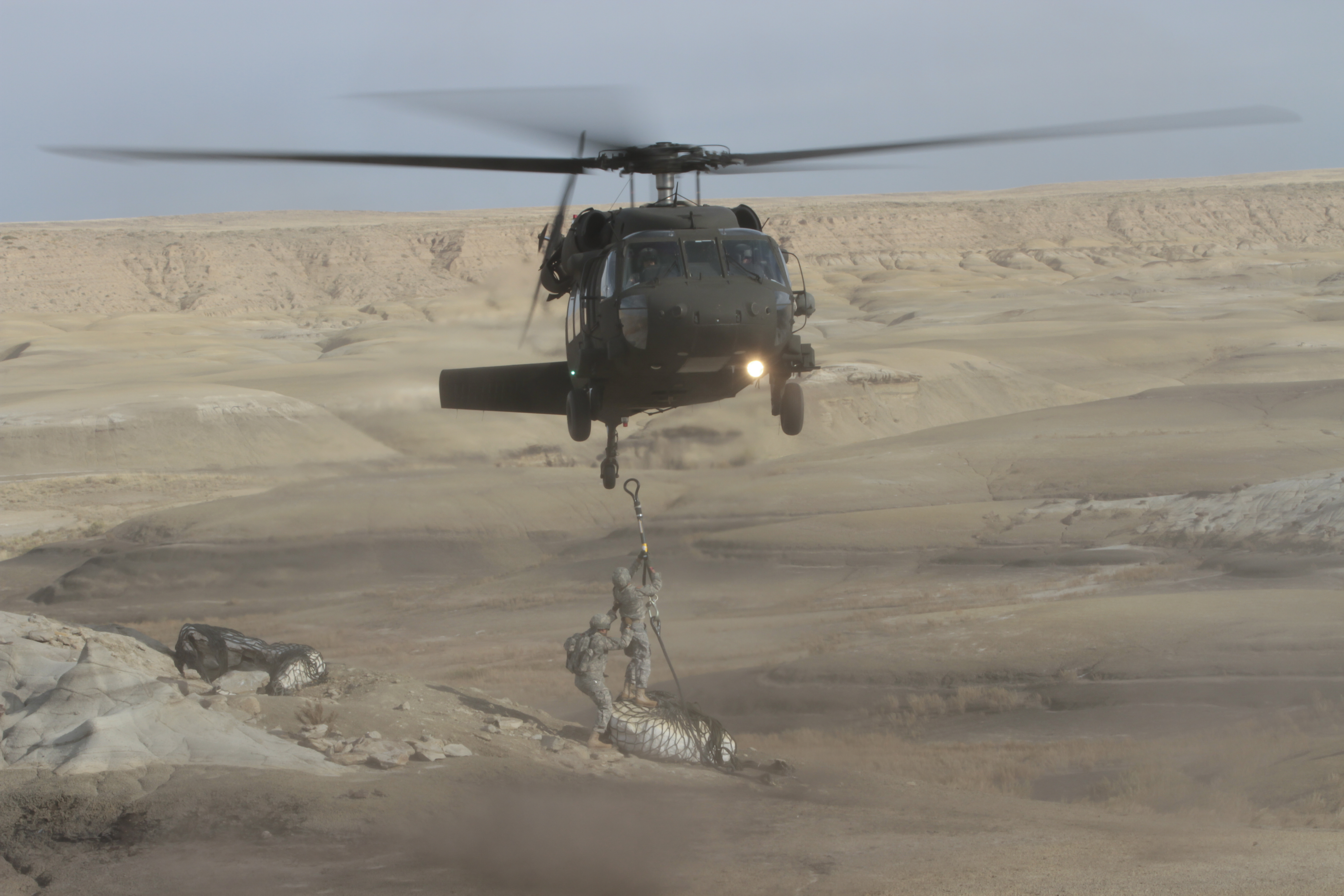
Specimen being airlifted with help from the New Mexico National Guard, 2015

Sometimes the identification of a specimen as Pentaceratops has proven to be highly contentious. In 1998 Thomas Lehman described OMNH 10165, a very large skull and its associated skeleton found in New Mexico in 1941. The skull is presently on display at the Sam Noble Oklahoma Museum of Natural History, and is the largest Pentaceratops exemplar known, with the distinction of having produced the largest known skull of any land vertebrate. However, in 2011, the skeleton was renamed as a separate genus, Titanoceratops, due to its more derived morphology, similarities to Triceratops, and lack of unique characteristics shared with Pentaceratops.

In 2014 Nicholas Longrich named a new species: Pentaceratops aquilonius, "the northern one", based on fragmentary fossils discovered during the 1930s near Manyberries in Alberta, Canada. The species has been described as having a first epiparietal pointing upwards instead of forwards. In 2016, Mallon et al. found P. aquilonius to be morphologically similar to Spiclypeus shipporum, with it possibly being the same species, and considered P. aquilonius a nomen dubium.

== Description ==
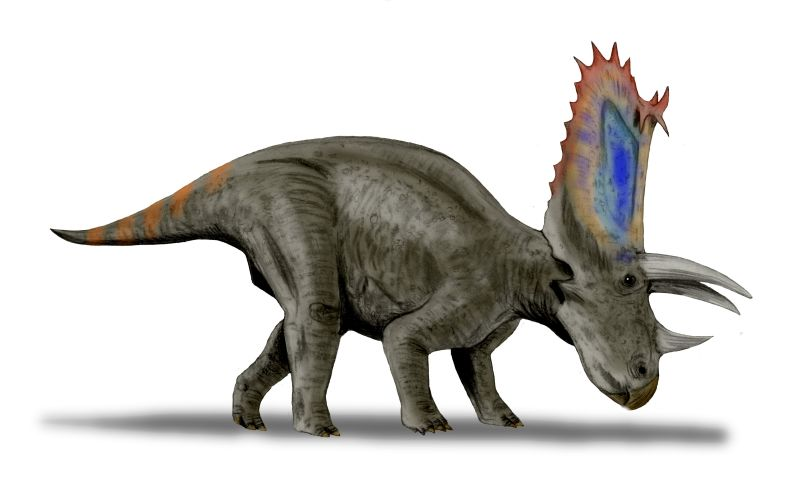
Restoration of P. sternbergii

Pentaceratops was a large ceratopsid; Dodson estimated the body length at 6 meters (20 ft). The skull length of AMNH 1624 is 2.3 meters (7.5 ft) while PMU R.200 has a length of 2.16 meters (7.1 ft). In 2016 Paul estimated its length at 5.5 meters (18 ft) and its weight at 2.5 metric tons (2.75 short tons). The nose horn of Pentaceratops is small and points upward and backward. The brow horns are very long and curve strongly forward. The somewhat upward tilted frill of Pentaceratops is considerably longer than that of Triceratops, with two large holes (parietal fenestrae) in it. It is rectangular, adorned by large triangular osteoderms: up to twelve episquamosals at the squamosal and three epiparietals at the parietal bone. These are largest at the rear corners of the frill, and are separated by a large U-shaped notch at the midline, a feature not recognized until 1981 when specimen UKVP 16100 was described. Within the notch the first epiparietals point forwards. The very thick jugals do not touch the squamosals, a possible autapomorphy.

The torso of Pentaceratops is tall and wide. The rear dorsal vertebrae bear long spines from which ligaments possibly ran to the front, to balance the high frill. The prepubis is long. The ischium is long and strongly curved forward. In smaller specimens the thigh bone bows outwards.

== Classification ==
Osborn originally assigned Pentaceratops to Ceratopsia. Within this group Pentaceratops belonged to the Ceratopsinae or Chasmosaurinae. It appears to be most closely related to Utahceratops. Their clade was perhaps more derived than the earlier genus Chasmosaurus but more basal than Anchiceratops, the latter representing a line of which Triceratops was a member, which lived a few million years later, right at the end of the Cretaceous period, when all ceratopsians died out.

The cladogram of the phylogeny of Pentaceratops according to a study by Scott Sampson et al. in 2010 found that the genus was most closely related to Utahceratops, from a similar age and region. The below cladogram follows Longrich (2014), who named a new species of Pentaceratops, and included nearly all chasmosaurine species.

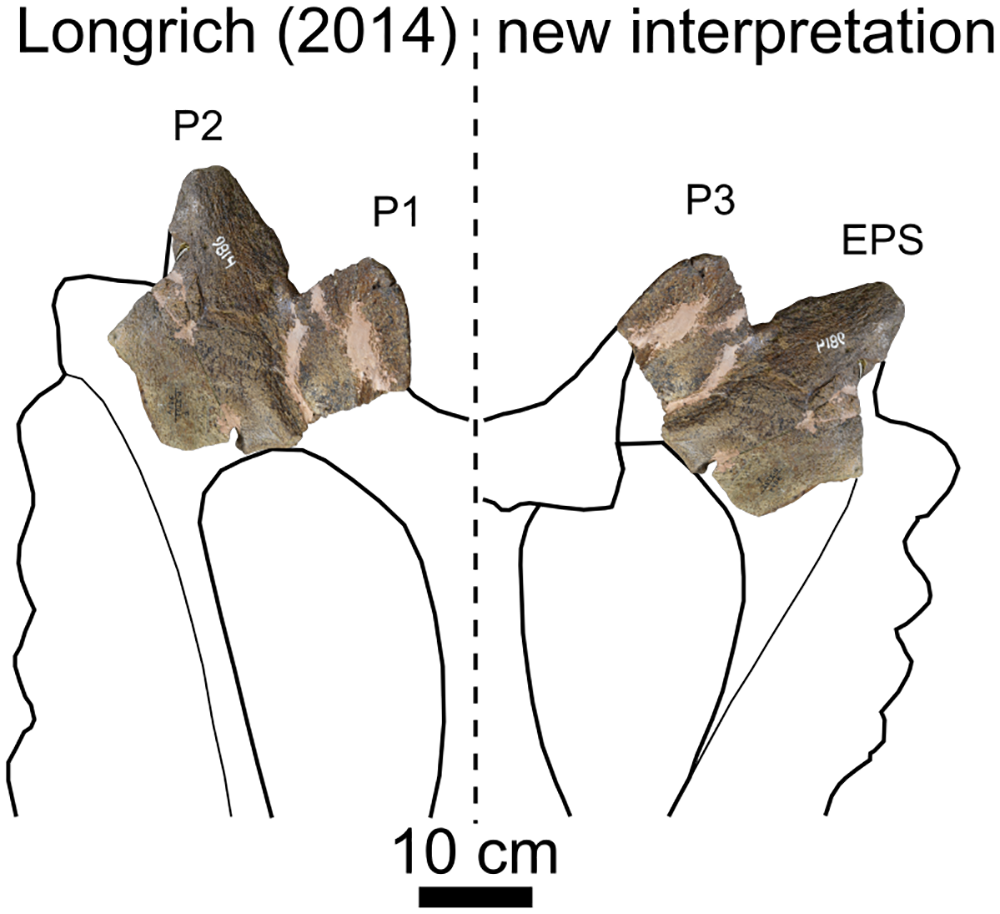
Paratype of P. aquilonius (CMN 9813), interpreted as an epiparietal of P. aquilonius (left) or Spiclypeus

Size of P. sternbergi compared to a human

- Chasmosaurinae
  - Mercuriceratops
  - - Judiceratops
    - - - Chasmosaurus
          - Chasmosaurus sp. CMN 2280
          - - Chasmosaurus belli
            - Chasmosaurus irvinensis
        - Mojoceratops
      - - Agujaceratops
        - - - Pentaceratops aquilonius
            - Williams Fork chasmosaur
            - - Pentaceratops sternbergii
              - Utahceratops
          - - Kosmoceratops
              - Kosmoceratops richardsoni
              - Kosmoceratops sp. CMN 8301
            - - - Anchiceratops
                - Almond Formation chasmosaur
              - - - Bravoceratops
                  - Coahuilaceratops
                - - Arrhinoceratops
                  - Triceratopsini
                    - Titanoceratops
                    - - Torosaurus
                      - Triceratops
                        - T.? utahensis
                        - - T. horridus
                          - T. prorsus

Longrich stated that the holotype and referred specimen of P. aquilonius fall within the diagnosis of Pentaceratops, and were recovered very close to the type species in the phylogeny. He noted that the placement of Utahceratops does not make the genus paraphyletic, as there is no requirement that genera are monophyletic. The Williams Fork chasmosaur differs from the Pentaceratops and Utahceratops species, and might require a new specific or generic name.

== Paleobiology ==
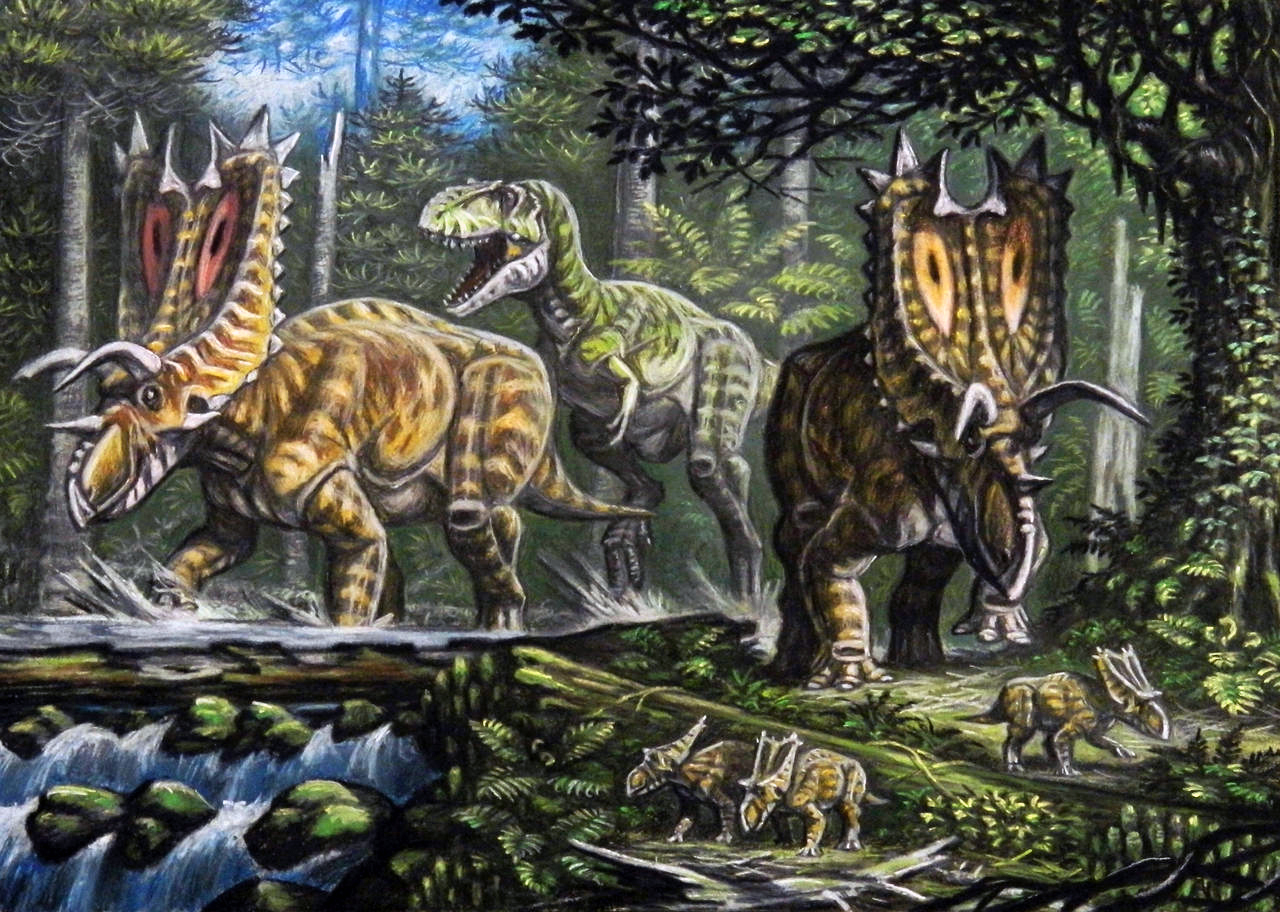
Restoration of Bistahieversor hunting Pentaceratops

Pentaceratops, like all ceratopsians, was an herbivore. During the Cretaceous, flowering plants were "geographically limited on the landscape", and so it is likely that this dinosaur fed on the predominant plants of the era: ferns, cycads and conifers. It would have used its sharp ceratopsian beak to bite off the branches which were then shredded - leaves, needles, and all - by the tooth batteries, providing a self-sharpening continuous cutting edge in both upper and lower jaws. Ultimately the plant material was digested by the large gut.

== Paleoecology ==
Pentaceratops lived around 76–73 million years ago, its remains having been mostly found in the Kirtland Formation in the San Juan Basin in New Mexico. Other dinosaurs that shared its habitat include the hadrosaur Parasaurolophus, the pachycephalosaur Sphaerotholus, the armored dinosaur Nodocephalosaurus and the tyrannosauroid Bistahieversor.

== See also ==
- Timeline of ceratopsian research
- Ah-Shi-Sle-Pah Wilderness Study Area, the type locality for Pentaceratops fenestratus

== Sources ==
- "Delayed Debut for Jumbo Dino Skull". Science. 282 (5390): 871b–871. 1998. doi:10.1126/science.282.5390.871b. S2CID 190533792.
- Dodson, P. (1996). The Horned Dinosaurs. Princeton University Press, Princeton, New Jersey. ISBN 978-0-691-05900-6.
- Lehman, T. M., 2001, Late Cretaceous dinosaur provinciality: In: Mesozoic Vertebrate Life, edited by Tanke, D. H., and Carpenter, K., Indiana University Press, pp. 310–328.
- Liddell, Henry George and Robert Scott (1980). A Greek-English Lexicon (Abridged ed.). United Kingdom: Oxford University Press. ISBN 978-0-19-910207-5.
- Sullivan, Robert M.; Lucas, Spencer G. (2006). "The Kirtlandian land-vertebrate "age" – faunal composition, temporal position and biostratigraphic correlation in the nonmarine Upper Cretaceous of western North America" (pdf). In Lucas, Spencer G.; Sullivan, Robert M. (eds.). Late Cretaceous Vertebrates from the Western Interior. New Mexico Museum of Natural History and Science Bulletin. Vol. 35. Albuquerque, New Mexico: New Mexico Museum of Natural History and Science. pp. 7–29.
- Nicholas R. Longrich (2011). "Titanoceratops ouranous, a giant horned dinosaur from the Late Campanian of New Mexico". Cretaceous Research. 32 (3): 264–276. Bibcode:2011CrRes..32..264L. doi:10.1016/j.cretres.2010.12.007.
- Lucas, Spencer G.; Sullivan, Robert M.; Hunt, A.P. (2006). "Re-evaluation of Pentaceratops and Chasmosaurus (Ornithischia, Ceratopsidae) in the Upper Cretaceous of the Western Interior" (pdf). In Lucas, Spencer G.; Sullivan, Robert M. (eds.). Late Cretaceous Vertebrates from the Western Interior. New Mexico Museum of Natural History and Science Bulletin. Vol. 35. Albuquerque, New Mexico: New Mexico Museum of Natural History and Science. pp. 367–370.
