= Edmontonian =

North American faunal epoch (70–68 million years ago)

The Edmontonian was a North American faunal epoch occurring during the Late Cretaceous, lasting from approximately 70 to 68 million years ago.

== Paleobiogeography ==
In southern North America, little changed in the transition from the Judithian to the Edmontonian. However, the northern biome experienced a general trend in reduction of centrosaurines, with leaving Pachyrhinosaurus as one of the few surviving species. Likewise among lambeosaurs, only the single genus Hypacrosaurus remained. Inland faunas of the age are distinguished by a Saurolophus-Anchiceratops association while more coastal areas were characterized by Pachyrhinosaurus and Edmontosaurus. Pachyrhinosaurus occurred as far north as Alaska. "Archaic" elements such as hypsilophodonts like Parksosaurus and the "(re)appearance" of basal neoceratopsians like Montanoceratops begin characterizing inland faunas. Paleontologist Thomas M. Lehman described the Edmontonian Arrhinoceratops as a likely ancestor for the Lancian Triceratops.

Ecological disturbance brought them to an end during the Edmontonian. Relative sea levels fell very rapidly due to the Laramide orogeny. Opportunistic generalist herbivores filled the vacated niches that were once filled by a diverse number of specialist forms. The newly formed ecosystems tended to be dominated by a single herbivorous species each. The new dominant herbivores were usually less ornamented and probably represent "survivors from indigenous lineages" rather than immigrants from other areas. Gradually however "relict" dinosaurs such as protoceratopsids and sauropods began expanding into lower altitude areas as sea-levels fell.
