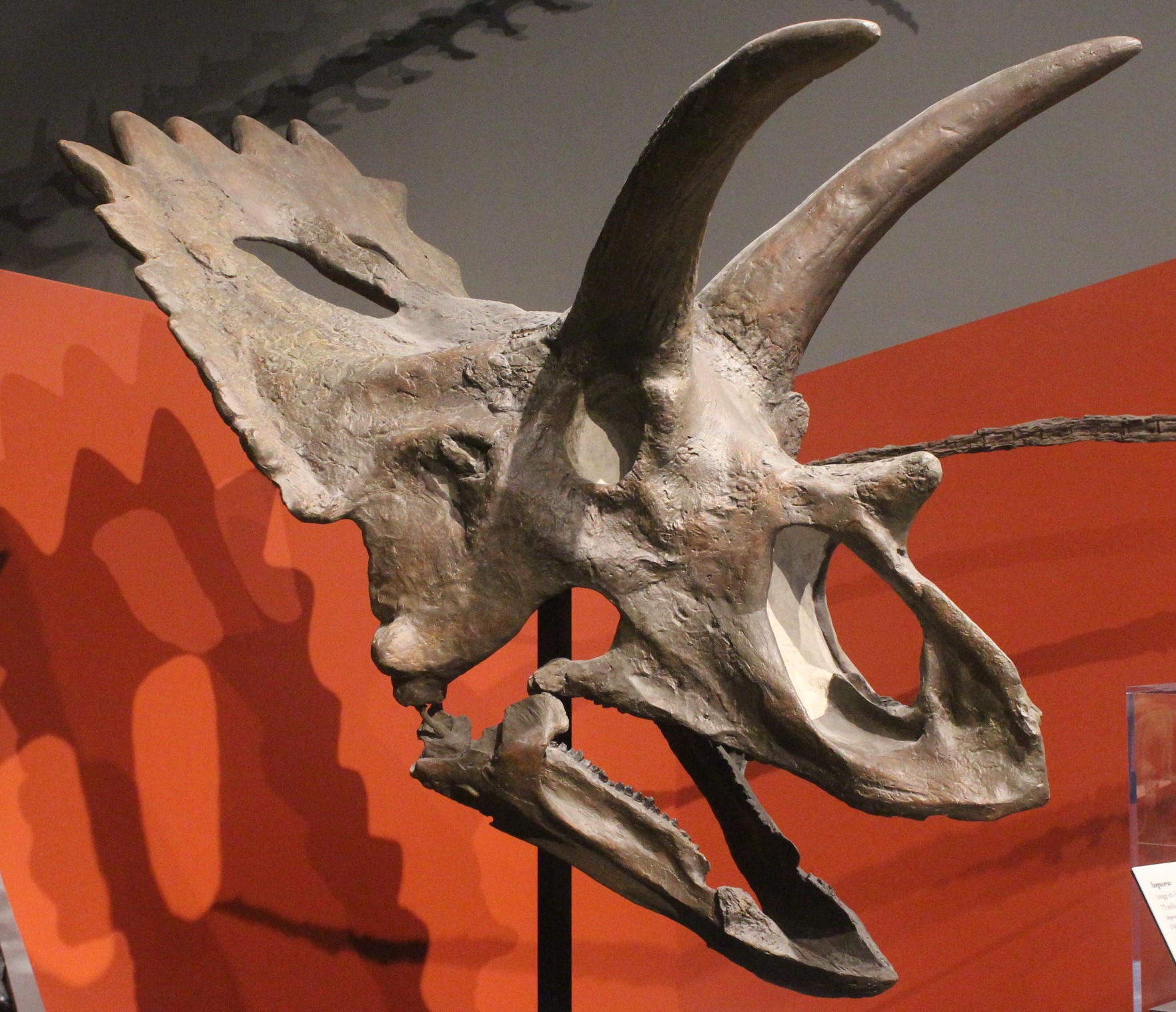
- Skull cast of TMP 1983.001.0001, University of Michigan Museum of Natural History

Scientific classification
- Kingdom: Animalia
- Phylum: Chordata
- Class: Reptilia
- Clade: Dinosauria
- Clade: †Ornithischia
- Clade: †Ceratopsia
- Family: †Ceratopsidae
- Subfamily: †Chasmosaurinae
- Genus: †Anchiceratops; Brown, 1914

Type species
- †Anchiceratops ornatus Brown, 1914

Synonyms
- Anchiceratops longirostris C.M. Sternberg, 1929

= Anchiceratops =

Anchiceratops Temporal range: Late Cretaceous, 73–68 Ma

Extinct genus of dinosaurs

Anchiceratops (/ˌæŋkiˈsɛrətɒps/ ANG-kee-SERR-ə-tops) is an extinct genus of chasmosaurine ceratopsid dinosaur that lived approximately 73 to 68 million years ago during the latter part of the Cretaceous Period in what is now Alberta, Canada. Anchiceratops was a medium-sized, heavily built, ground-dwelling, quadrupedal herbivore that could grow up to an estimated 4.3 metres (14 ft) long. Its skull featured two long brow horns and a short horn on the nose. The skull frill was elongated and rectangular, its edges adorned by coarse triangular projections. About a dozen skulls of the genus have been found.

== History of discovery ==
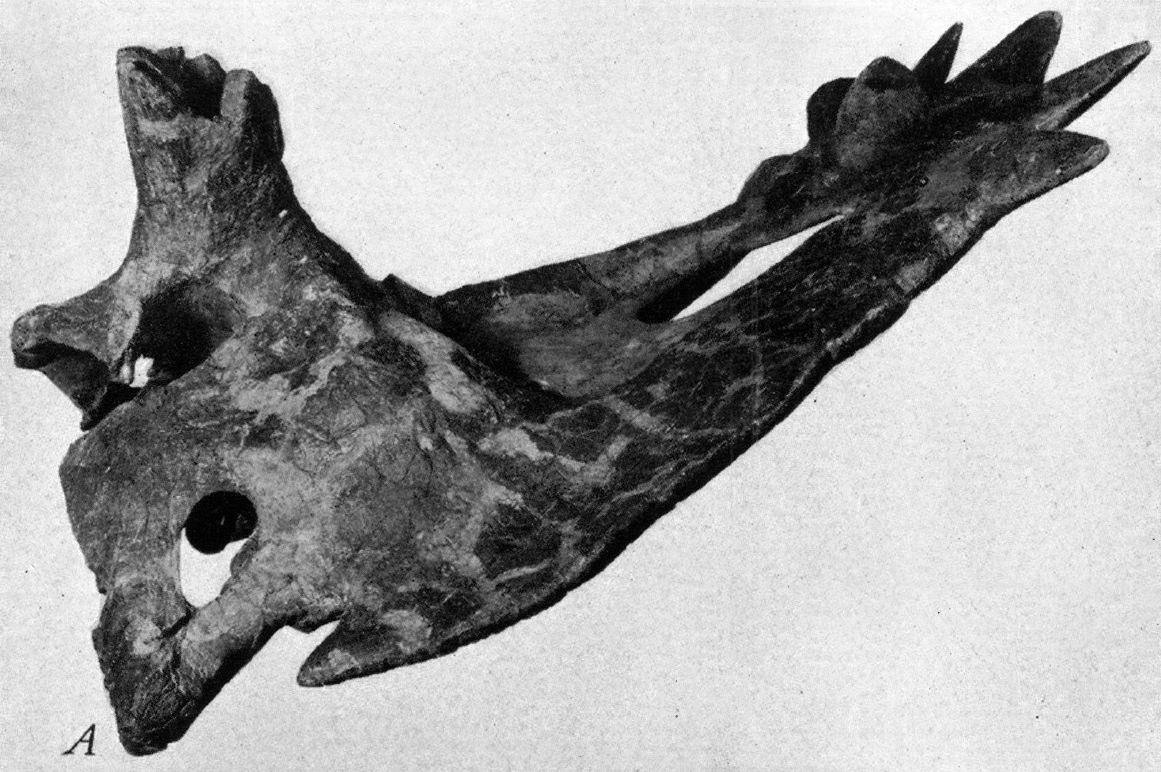
Type specimen AMNH 5251

The first remains of Anchiceratops were discovered along the Red Deer River in the Canadian province of Alberta in 1912 by an expedition led by Barnum Brown. The holotype, specimen AMNH 5251, is the back half of a skull, including the long frill, and two other partial skulls, specimens AMNH 5259 (the paratype) and AMNH 5273, were found at the same time, which are now stored in the American Museum of Natural History in New York City. A complete skull designated NMC 8535, was discovered by Charles M. Sternberg at Morrin in 1924, and was described as A. longirostris five years later, in 1929. but this species is widely considered a junior synonym of A. ornatus today. In total, at least ten incomplete skulls have been recovered. The skulls are different with respect to their proportions (e.g. size of the supraorbital horn cores, the dimensions of the frill) which had led researchers to conclude that the disparity is ontogenetic.

The genus name Anchiceratops, means "near horned face", and is derived from the Greek words "anchi" (αγχι-) meaning "near", "keras" (κερας) meaning "horn", and "ops" (ωψ) meaning "face". Anchiceratops was described and named by American paleontologist Barnum Brown, in 1914, as he believed that this dinosaur represented a transitional form closely related to both Monoclonius and Triceratops and intermediate between them, but closest in the development of the skull frill to the latter, hence the generic name meaning "near Ceratops". The type and only valid species known today is Anchiceratops ornatus, whose name refers to the ornate margin of its frill.

Another specimen, NMC 8547 (or CMN 8547) collected by Sternberg in 1925, lacks most of the skull but is otherwise the most complete skeleton known from any ceratopsid, preserving a complete spinal column down to the last tail vertebra. Sternberg's material is now housed in the Canadian Museum of Nature in Ottawa. NMC 8547 is displayed as a half-mount with the better preserved right side showing, and completed with a cast skull replica of NMC 8535. Other material has been found since, including one or two possible bonebed deposits in Alberta, but very little Anchiceratops material has been described.

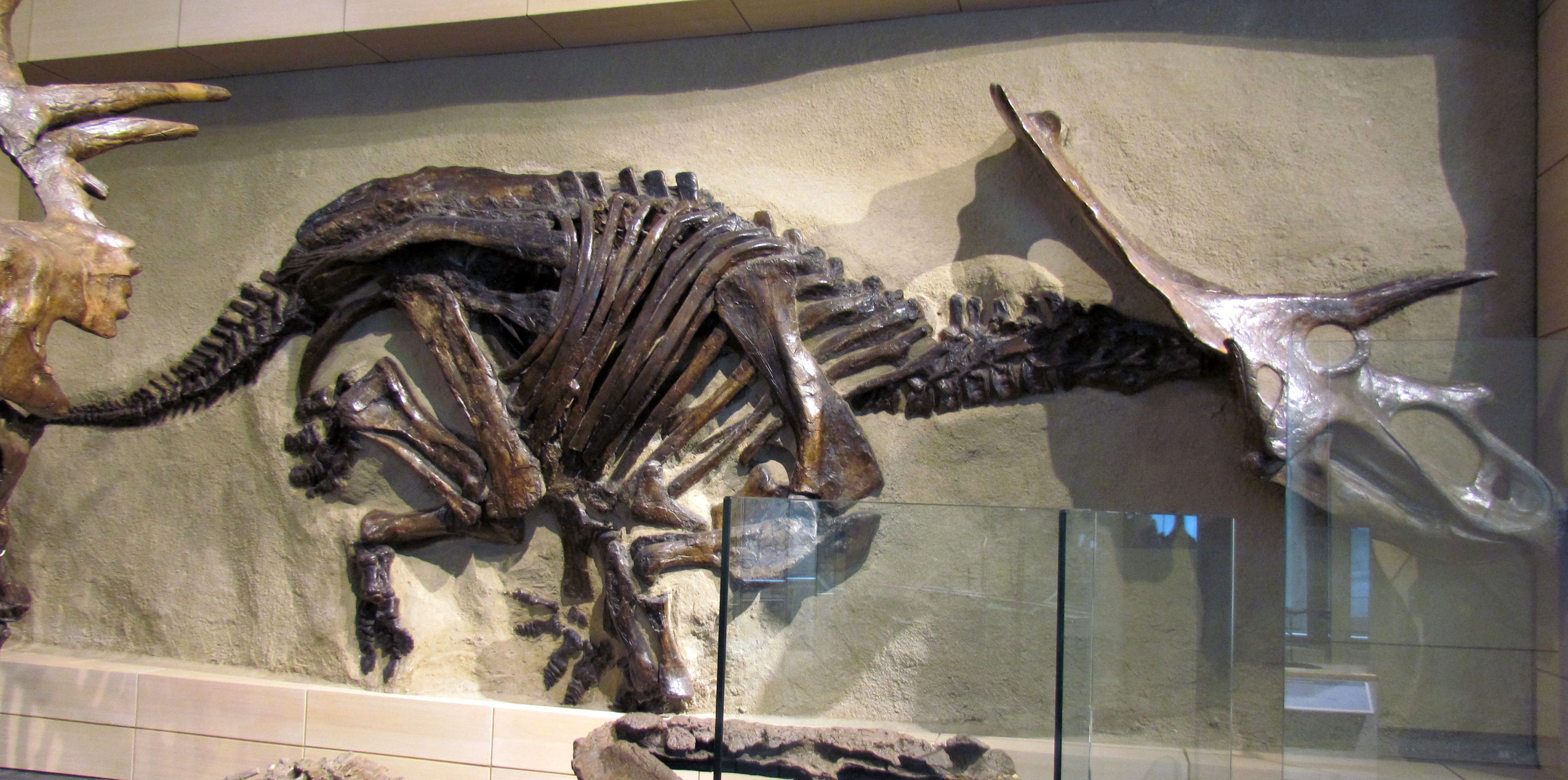
NMC 8547 mounted at the Canadian Museum of Nature, completed with a skull cast of NMC 8535. NMC 8547 might represent a separate taxon

Most Anchiceratops fossils have been discovered in the Horseshoe Canyon Formation of Alberta, which belongs to the later part of the Campanian stage of the Late Cretaceous Period (Anchiceratops remains are known from the lower part of the formation, and range in age between 72.5 and 71 million years ago). Frill fragments found in the early Maastrichtian Almond Formation of Wyoming in the United States resemble Anchiceratops. Frill pieces (specimens NMC 9813, 9814 and 9829) found from two localities in the older Dinosaur Park Formation were originally considered to represent Anchiceratops, but later reclassified as a species of Pentaceratops and subsequently considered indeterminate. Brow horn fragments (specimens NMC 9590 and 10645), also from Dinosaur Park, were likewise referred to Anchiceratops and later considered to belong to animal similar to Pentaceratops or an unnamed species from the Almond Formation. Anchiceratops remains were also reported in terrestrial sediments from the St. Mary River Formation at the Scabby Butte locality in southwestern Alberta, but later work would consider these indeterminate chasmosaurines.

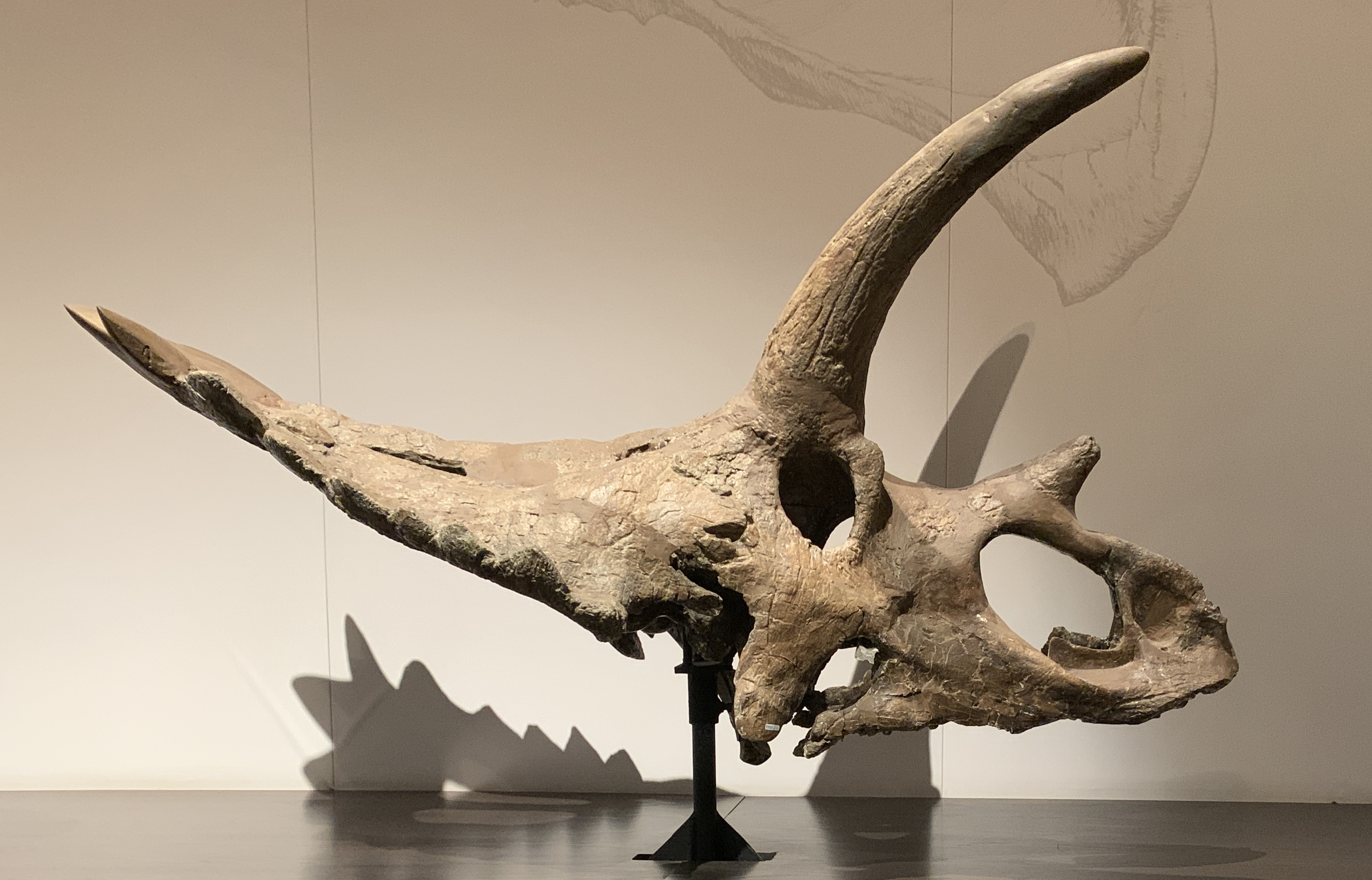
Juvenile Anchiceratops skull, TMP 1983.001.0001 (original, not cast).

In 2012, Mallon concluded that many more Anchiceratops fossils had been collected than previously had been realized. These included the specimens TMP 1983.001.0001, a nearly complete skull of a juvenile; UW 2419, a nearly complete skull; ROM 802, a skull lacking the snout; FMNH P15003, the upper side of a skull lacking the snout; CMN 11838, a left skull frill; CMN 12–1915, frill fragments; and UALVP 1618, the rear edge of a frill. This larger number of fossils can be examined by statistical analysis to solve certain long-standing controversies about the genus.

== Description ==
Size comparison with postcranium restored after NMC 8547

Like other ceratopsids, A. ornatus was a quadrupedal herbivore with three horns on its face, a parrot-like beak, and a long frill extending from the back of its head. The two horns above the eyes were longer than the single horn on its snout, as in other chasmosaurines.

Anchiceratops was a medium-sized ceratopsid. If specimen NMC 8547 is not taken into account, no very exact estimations of the body length of Anchiceratops can be given. Some popular science books state that it approached 20 feet (6 m) in length. In 2010 Gregory S. Paul, on the assumption that specimen NMC 8547 represented Anchiceratops, estimated its length at 4.3 metres, its weight at 1.2 tonnes.

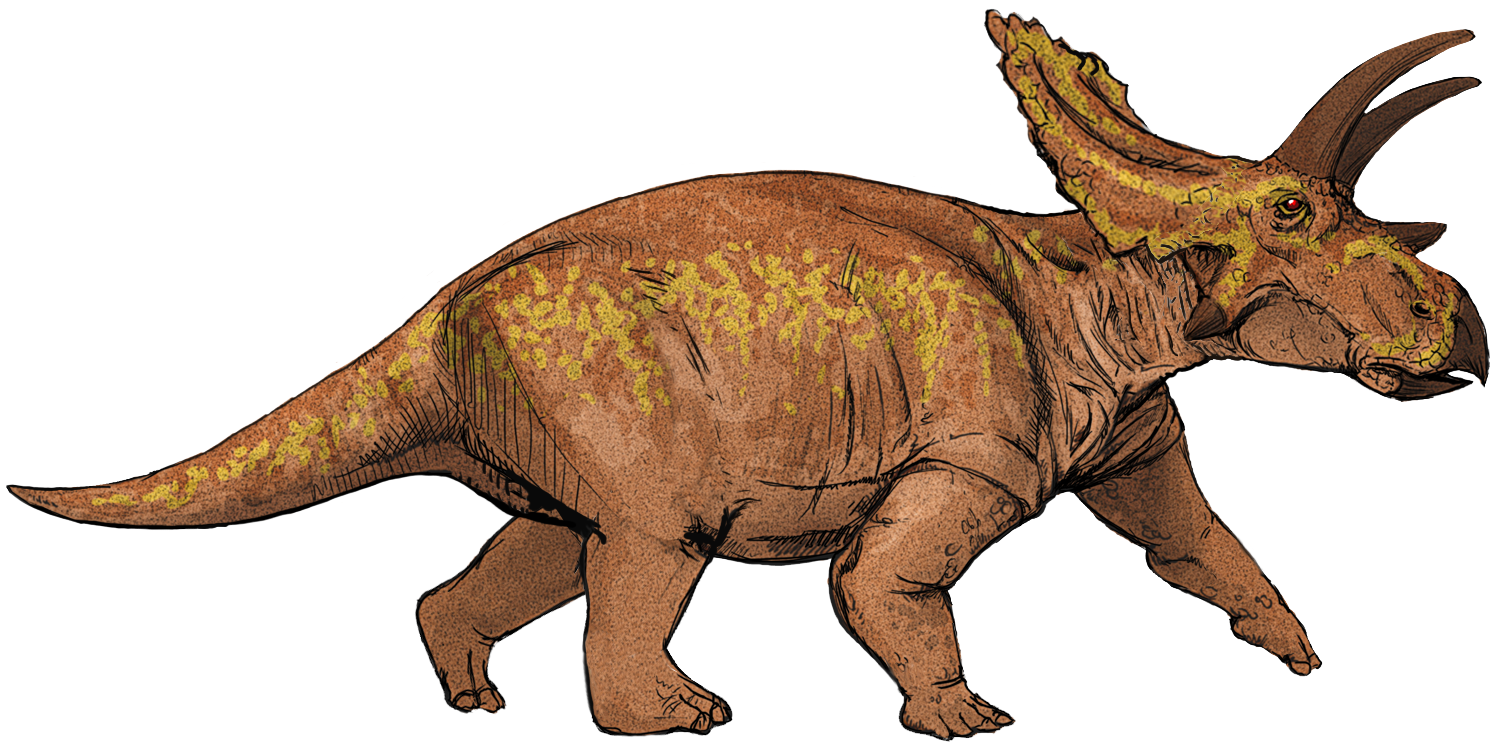
Restoration, with generalised chasmosaurine rump, not based on NMC 8547

Anchiceratops frills are very distinctive. Rectangular in shape, the frill is edged by large epoccipitals, which are osteoderms in the form of triangular bony projections. These are exceptionally wide and coarse. Some of these epoccipitals are on the side of the frill, formed by the squamosal; these episquamosals vary between five and nine in number. The last episquamosal is very large, approaching the size of the three osteoderms per side on the rear edge of the frill, the epiparietals. Another characteristic feature is the pair of bony knobs located on either side of the midline, towards the end of the frill. These are pointing sideways and are very variable in form and size between individuals. The parietal bone, forming the rear edge and the middle of the frill, has smaller parietal fenestrae, window-like openings, than those seen in other chasmosaurines like Pentaceratops and Torosaurus. The frill has deep arterial grooves on both the upper and the underside.

Specimen NMC 8547, on which traditionally descriptions of the postcrania of Anchiceratops have been based, has many traits that are unique in the Chasmosaurinae. The vertebral column contains seventy-four vertebrae: ten of the neck, thirteen dorsals, twelve sacrals and thirty-nine caudals. Typically chasmosaurines have twelve dorsals, ten sacrals and up to forty-six tail vertebrae. Mallon presumed that the synsacrum, the fused vertebrae supporting the pelvis, had shifted to the rear. The neck of NMC 8547 is exceptionally long, with four syncervicals, fused anterior cervical vertebrae. Also the pelvis is very long. The tail is short. The forelimbs are very robust, with a large deltopectoral crest on the humerus, indicating a heavy musculature.

== Classification ==
- Ceratopsidae
  - Centrosaurinae
  - Chasmosaurinae
    - Chasmosaurus
    - - Mojoceratops
      - - Agujaceratops
        - - - Utahceratops
            - Pentaceratops
          - - Coahuilaceratops
            - - - Kosmoceratops
                - Vagaceratops
              - - Anchiceratops
                - - Arrhinoceratops
                  - Triceratopsini
                    - Ojoceratops
                    - Eotriceratops
                    - - Torosaurus
                      - - Nedoceratops
                        - Triceratops

Ceratopsid cladogram based on the phylogenetic analysis, conducted by Sampson et al., in 2010.

Brown in 1914 assigned Anchiceratops to the Ceratopsia. In 1915, William Diller Matthew refined this to the Ceratopsidae. In the same year Lawrence Lambe assigned this genus to a new taxon that he erected, "eoceratopsinae", which included "Eoceratops" (now Chasmosaurus), "Diceratops" (now Nedoceratops) and Triceratops. "Eoceratopsinae" however soon fell into disuse as a taxon. Ironically, in the same study Lambe erected Chasmosaurinae, the taxon that Anchiceratops is assigned to currently. Over the decades Lull (1933), Romer (1956), Russell and Chamney (1967), Molnar (1980) agreed with the assignment to Ceratopsidae.

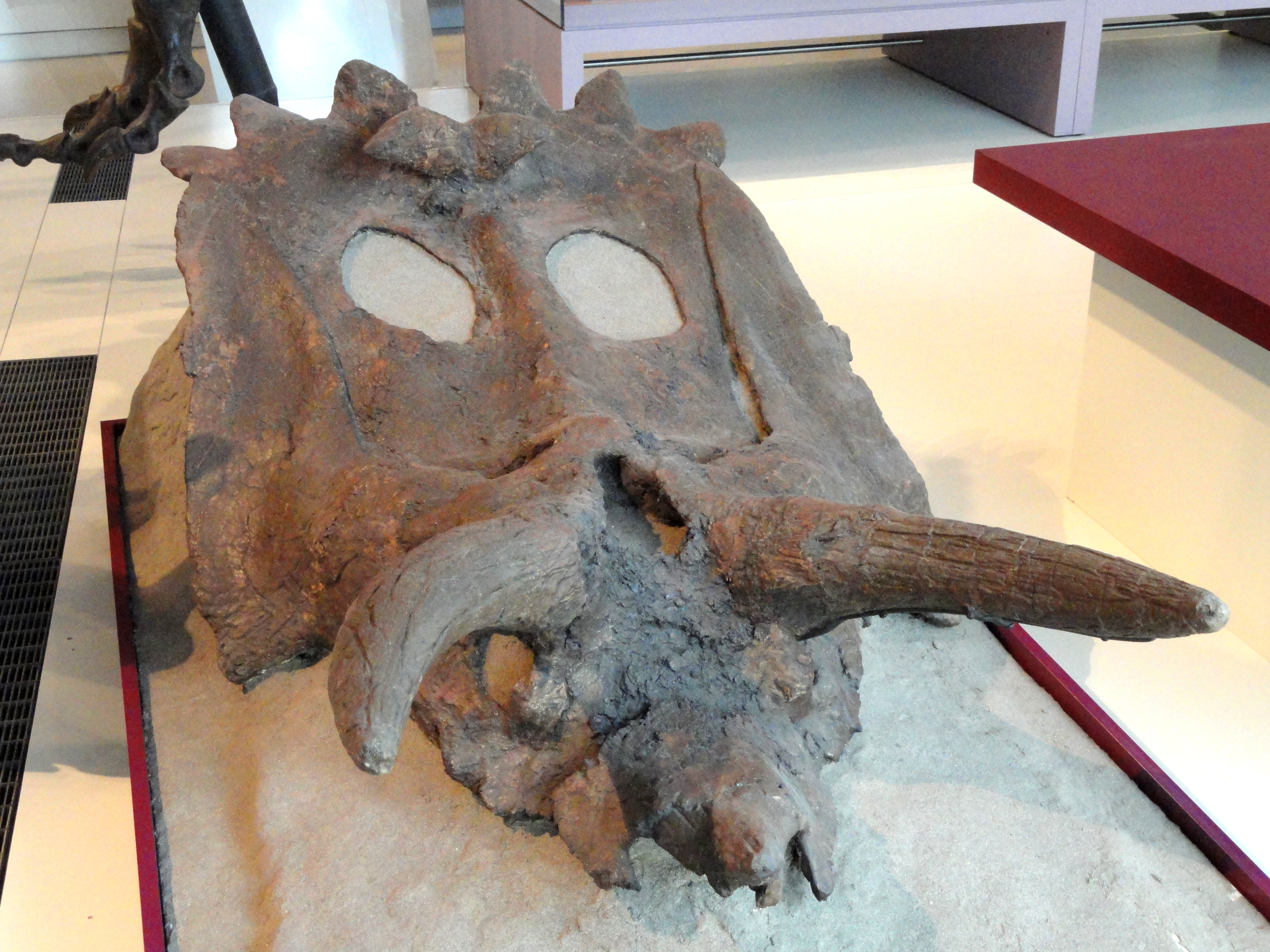
ROM 802, a skull in the Royal Ontario Museum

In 1990, Peter Dodson and Phil Currie placed it in the Chasmosaurinae. The phylogenetic analysis conducted by Ryan et al. (2010) confirmed this assignment. Modern cladistic analyses usually recover Anchiceratops in a more advanced position within the Chasmosaurinae, closer to Arrhinoceratops than to Chasmosaurus. Mallon's study of 2012 concluded however, that Anchiceratops was more closely related to Chasmosaurus than to Triceratops, suggesting that this genus was less derived than previously thought.

C.M. Sternberg had originally designated a smaller skull as the type specimen for a new species Anchiceratops longirostris, because of its size and its horns which are significantly more slender and point forward instead of upward. Later however, paleontologists had concluded that the size and form of this skull falls within the expected range of variation seen in A. ornatus and that it was probably a member of that species.

In 2010 Mallon removed specimen NMC 8547 from the fossil material of Anchiceratops because of the few frill elements associated with it and because it could not be determined with certainty whether the material belonged to this taxon. The related Arrhinoceratops is known from the same formation, and has a comparable frill surface structure. According to Mallon, in 1925 C.M. Sternberg had referred the material to Anchiceratops because he had been unaware that Arrhinoceratops had been described in March of that year. If correct, this would mean that no unequivocal postcrania (all skeletal elements posterior to the skull) of Anchiceratops are known.

== Paleobiology ==
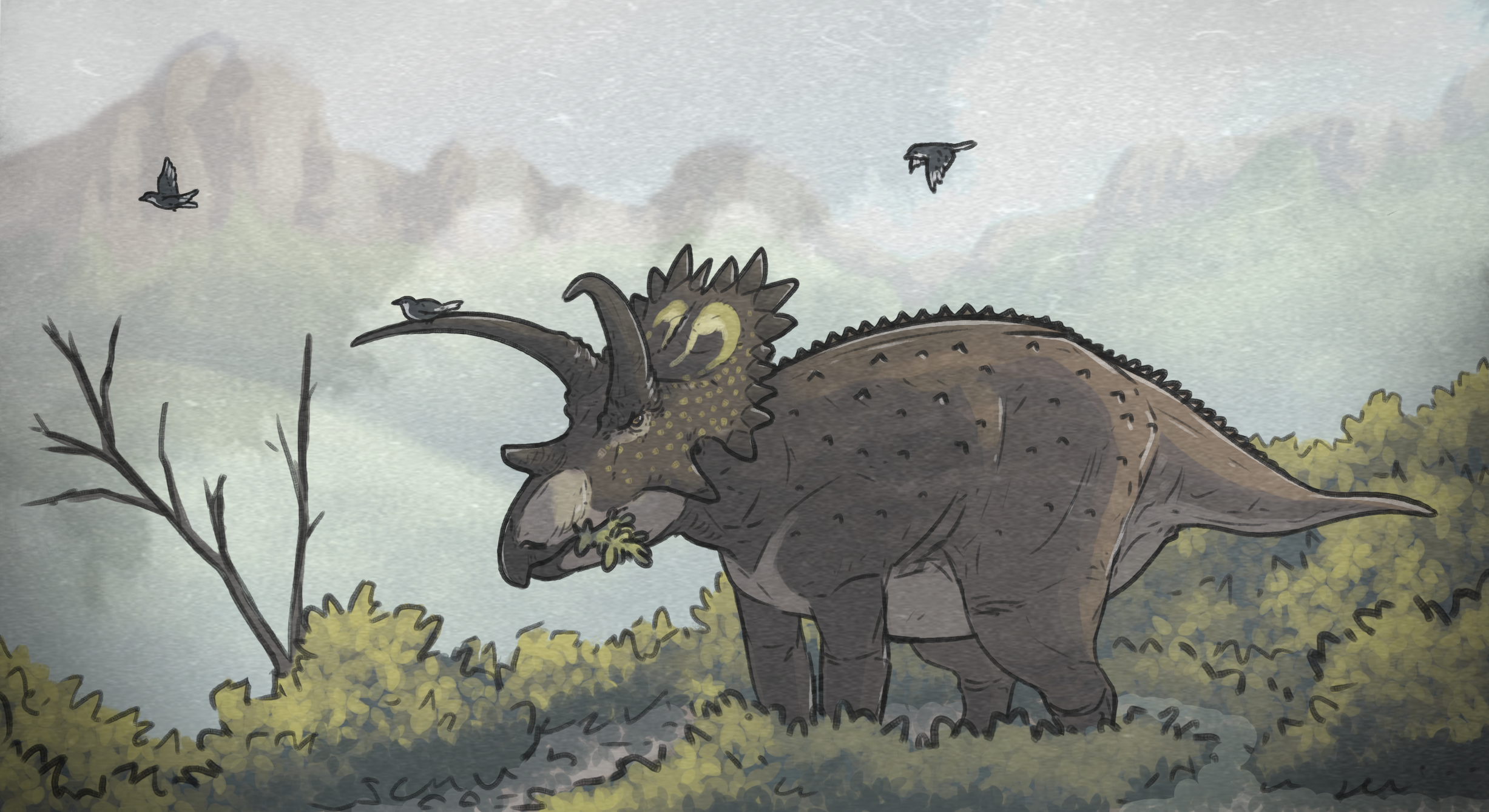
Life restoration in environment

Anchiceratops is rare compared to other ceratopsians in the area, and usually found near marine sediments, in both the Horseshoe Canyon and Dinosaur Park Formations. This indicates that Anchiceratops may have lived in estuaries where other ceratopsids did not live. Flowering plants were increasingly common but still rare compared to the conifers, cycads and ferns which probably made up the majority of ceratopsian diets.

In 1914 Brown suggested that the distinctive frill and horn form of Anchiceratops were caused by sexual selection and intra-species recognition, as he could not explain the differences between the taxa by a difference in defence function. In 1959, Wann Langston Jr. suggested that Anchiceratops engaged in a semi-aquatic lifestyle. The long snout would have allowed the animal to cross deeper swamps walking, catching breath on the water's surface and the heavy frill would have acted as a counterbalance to help point the beak upwards. Later paleontologists tended to reject this notion, emphasizing that dinosaurs in general were land animals, but in 2012 Mallon again suggested a semi-aquatic lifestyle, like a modern hippopotamus, at least for specimen NMC 8547. This would be an explanation for the robustness and extreme musculature of the limbs. Mallon admitted that its small tail was not a swimming-organ.

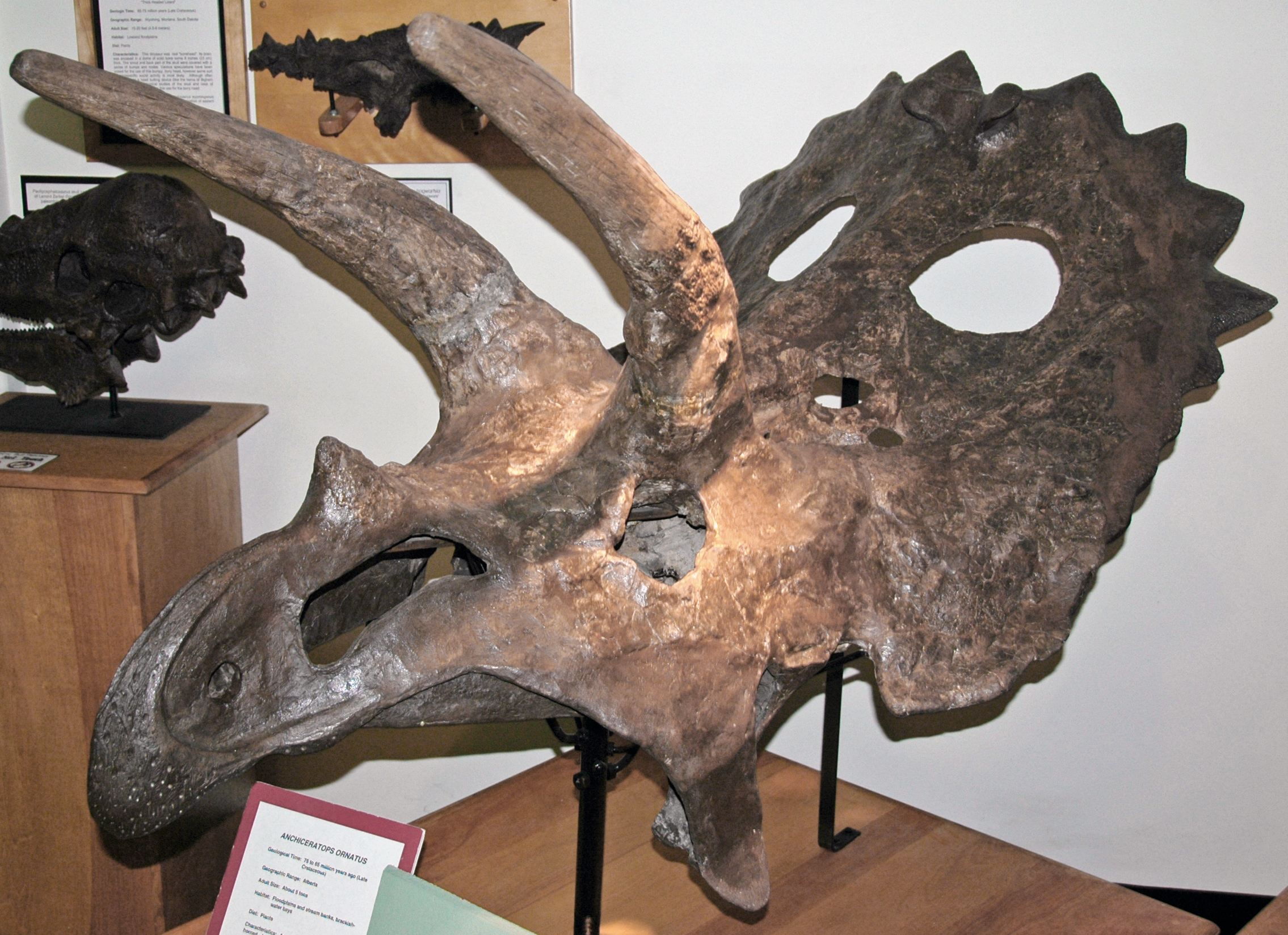
Skull UW 2419, University of Wyoming Geological Museum

In 1990 Thomas Lehman proposed that Anchiceratops was a sexually dimorphic genus, where the skull of A. longirostris represents a female. The other Anchiceratops skulls that are larger, more robust, and have much longer horns that point more vertically were proposed to represent males. Preliminary statistical analysis of the Anchiceratops specimens by Mallon (2012) revealed that these variations in skull form do not actually fall into two distinct morphs, and more likely represent individual variation, forcing him to reject the hypothesis that there were two species. Likewise there was no proof of sexual dimorphism.

In 2012, Jordan Cole Mallon e.a. pointed out that Anchicertops ornatus as a species was exceptionally long-lived; other ceratopsid species typically last a few hundred thousand years. Several possible explanations were given: a decreased competition by related species; less habitat fragmentation by the recession of the Western Interior Seaway; and a more generalist lifestyle.

== Paleoenvironment ==
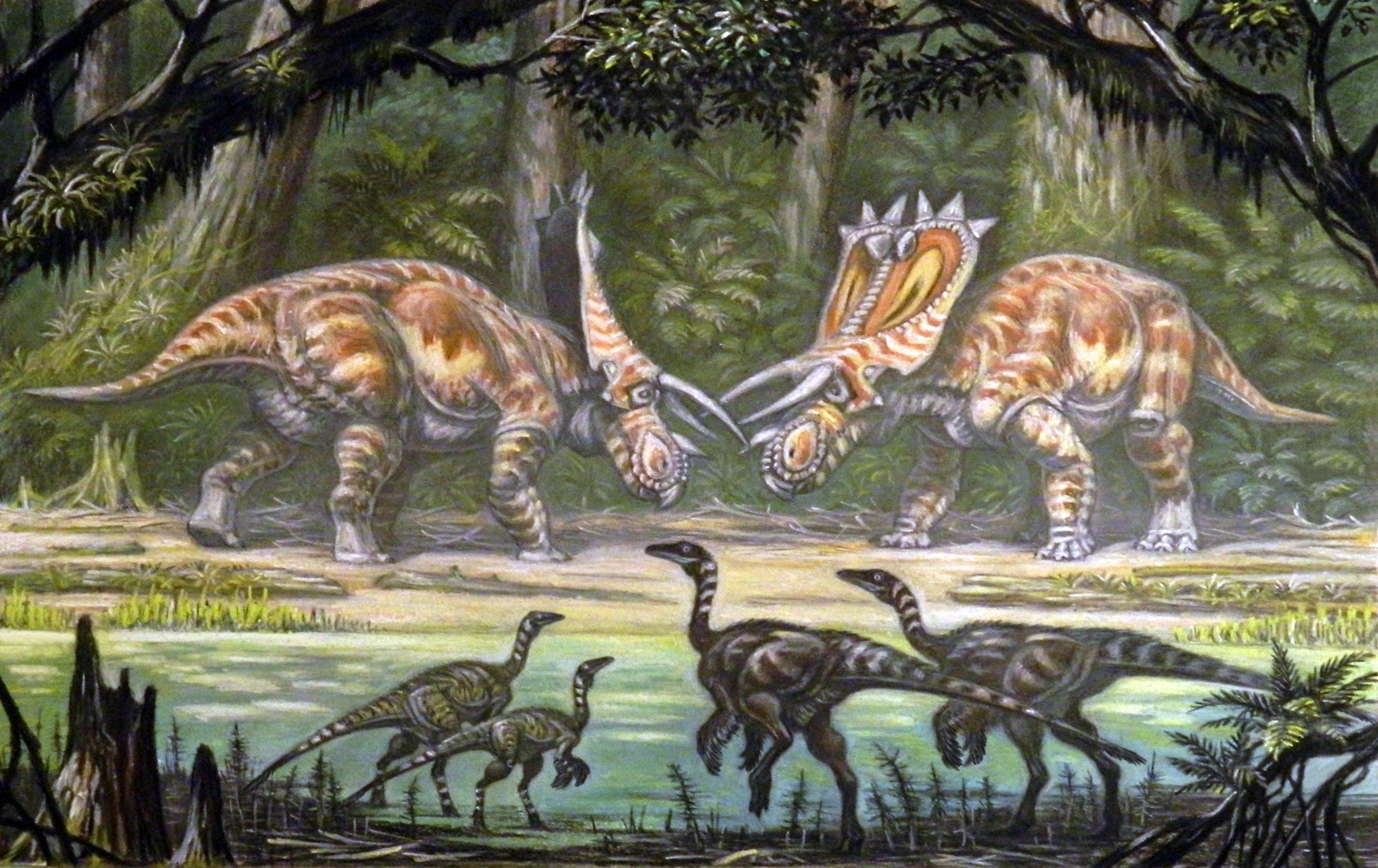
Restoration of two individuals facing off, with Ornithomimus in the foreground

The Horseshoe Canyon Formation has been radiometrically dated as being between 74 and 67 million years old. It was deposited during the gradual withdrawal of the Western Interior Seaway, during the Campanian and Maastrichtian stage of the Late Cretaceous period. The Horseshoe Canyon Formation is a terrestrial unit which is part of the Edmonton Group that includes the Battle Formation and the Whitemud Member, both in Edmonton. The valley where dinosaurs lived included ancient meandering estuary channels, straight channels, peat swamps, river deltas, floodplains, shorelines and wetlands. Due to the changing sea levels, many different environments are represented in the Horseshoe Canyon Formation, including offshore and near-shore marine habitats and coastal habitats like lagoons, and tidal flats. The area was wet and warm with a temperate to subtropical climate. Just prior to the Campanian–Maastrichtian boundary, the mean annual temperature and precipitation in this region dropped rapidly. The dinosaurs from this formation form part of the Edmontonian land vertebrate age, and are distinct from those in the formations above and below.

Anchiceratops specimens are found in the upper part of Unit one of this formation, part of the Horsetheif member, dated to about 72-71 million years ago. Anchiceratops shared its paleoenvironment with other dinosaurs, such as maniraptorans (Epichirostenotes curriei), ornithomimids (Ornithomimus edmontonicus), pachycephalosaurids (Sphaerotholus edmontonensis), hadrosaurids (Edmontosaurus regalis), ceratopsians (Pachyrhinosaurus canadensis), and tyrannosaurids (Albertosaurus sarcophagus), which were apex predators. Of these, the hadrosaurs dominated in terms of sheer number and made up half of all dinosaurs who lived in this region. Other vertebrates present in the Horseshoe Canyon Formation at the time of Anchiceratops included reptiles, and amphibians. Sharks, rays, sturgeons, bowfins, gars and the gar-like Aspidorhynchus made up the fish fauna. Reptiles such as turtles and crocodilians are rare in the Horseshoe Canyon Formation, and this was thought to reflect the relatively cool climate which prevailed at the time. A study by Quinney et al. (2013) however, showed that the decline in turtle diversity, which was previously attributed to climate, coincided instead with changes in soil drainage conditions, and was limited by aridity, landscape instability, and migratory barriers. The saltwater plesiosaur Leurospondylus was present and freshwater environments were populated by turtles, Champsosaurus, and crocodilians like Leidyosuchus and Stangerochampsa. Evidence has shown that multituberculates and the early marsupial Didelphodon coyi were present. Vertebrate trace fossils from this region included the tracks of theropods, ceratopsians and ornithopods, which provide evidence that these animals were also present. Non-vertebrates in this ecosystem included both marine and terrestrial invertebrates.

== See also ==
- Timeline of ceratopsian research
