= Judithian =

North American faunal stage

The Judithian was a North American faunal stage lasting from 83.5 to 70.6 million years ago. It overlaps with the Campanian global stage.

== Fauna ==
Dinosaur faunas of the Judithian age may represent the peak of dinosaur evolution in North America. Hadrosaurs were universally the dominant herbivore of the period and comprised more than half of "a typical assemblage." This was also the period of greatest genetic diversity among large herbivorous dinosaurs. Just in Montana and Southern Alberta were ten genera of ceratopsians and ten genera of hadrosaurs.

== Paleobiogeography ==
Thomas M. Lehman has observed that Corythosaurus and Centrosaurus haven't been discovered outside of southern Alberta even though they are the most abundant Judithian dinosaurs in the region. Large herbivores like the ceratopsians and hadrosaurs living in North America during the Late Cretaceous had "remarkably small geographic ranges" despite their large body size and high mobility. This restricted distribution strongly contrasts with modern mammalian faunas whose large herbivores' ranges "typical[ly] ... span much of a continent." Another example is Pentaceratops, the only known Judithian ceratopsian from New Mexico. Only the rarer species among modern mammal communities would be able to distinguish different latitudinal zones, and some of these taxa are likely too rare to fossilize. This lack of provinciality exists despite the strong temperature gradient. Restrictions in herbivorous dinosaur distribution may be due to foliage preferences, narrow tolerance for variation in climate or other environmental factors. The restrictions on herbivorous dinosaur distribution must have been due to ecological factors rather than physical barriers because carnivorous dinosaurs tended to have wider distributions, especially smaller forms.

As of his 2001 paper, restrictions in dinosaur occurrences based on distance from the paleo-shoreline had already been well documented. Vaguely distinguished inland-versus-coastal dinosaurs had been discussed previously in the scientific literature. Terrestrial sedimentary strata from the Judithian to the Lancian are generally regressive throughout the entire sequence the preserved changes in fossil communities represent not only phylogenetic changes but ecological zones from the submontane habitats to near-sea level coastal habitats. Modern life at high elevations in lower latitudes resembles life at low elevation in higher latitudes. There may be parallels to this phenomenon in Cretaceous ecosystems, for instance, Pachyrhinosaurus is found in both Alaska and upland environments in southern Alberta. Northern and Southern animal biomes approximately correspond respectively with the Aquillapollenites and Normapolles palynofloral provinces.

=== Associations ===
An association between Centrosaurus and Corythosaurus is characteristic of southern Alberta. Earlier research had found that lambeosaurines are less common in contemporary Montanan strata and with different centrosaurs as Monoclonius takes the place of Centrosaurus. Inland environments also differed, with the contemporary Two Medicine Formation preserving an inland fauna characterized by Maiasaura and the early pachyrhinosaur Einiosaurus. Farther south was characterized by lower taxonomic diversity in communities where lambeosaurines were less common and centrosaurs were completely lacking. There Kritosaurus, Parasaurolophus, and Pentaceratops are the dominant fauna. The giant eusuchian Deinosuchus is also "conspicuous" in the southern biome. Farther south, in Texas, Kritosaurus predominates. The biomes of the Eastern US may have resembled those of Texas except completely lacking in ceratopsians. Parasaurolophus and Kritosaurus are also present in northern latitudes, so evidently exchange between them occurred, but both are uncommon outside of the southern biome.
