= Takumi Nagao =

Japanese paleontologist (1891–1943)

- 長尾 巧
- Born: March 9, 1891; Tagawa, Fukuoka Prefecture, Japan
- Died: August 28, 1943 (aged 52)
- Education: Tokyo Higher Normal School; Tohoku Imperial University
- Known for: Study of Nipponosaurus fossils
- Scientific career
- Fields: Geology, Paleontology
- Workplaces: Yamaguchi Prefectural Iwakuni High School; Kagoshima Normal School; Hokkaido Imperial University; Tohoku Imperial University
- Doctoral advisor: Chokatsu Yabe

Takumi Nagao (長尾 巧; March 9, 1891 – August 28, 1943) was a Japanese geologist and paleontologist. He is best known for his research on the fossils of Nipponosaurus.

== Biography ==
Nagao was born in what is now Tagawa, Fukuoka Prefecture. After graduating from the Tokyo Higher Normal School, he worked as a teacher at Iwakuni High School in Yamaguchi Prefecture and at the Kagoshima Normal School. While studying at Tokyo Higher Normal School, he belonged to the Department of Natural History and became interested in geology through the lectures of Denzō Satō.

He later entered Tohoku Imperial University, where he studied geology under Chokatsu Yabe in the Faculty of Science. After graduating in 1921, he remained at the university as a lecturer. His early research focused on the geological structure of coalfields in northern Kyushu, his home region.

From 1927 to 1929, Nagao conducted research in Paris, France. This overseas study was then a common practice for faculty candidates. During this time, he earned his Doctor of Science degree and was appointed associate professor. After returning to Japan, he joined the newly established Faculty of Science at Hokkaido Imperial University in 1930 as a professor. At Hokkaido University, he taught courses in historical geology and paleontology in the Department of Geology and Mineralogy. He studied the geology of Hokkaido’s coalfields, including those around Ishikari, and conducted research on Japanese fossils from the Mesozoic and Cenozoic eras.

In 1933, the skull of a mammal discovered in Sakhalin was brought to him, which he identified as belonging to Desmostylus. Nagao personally traveled to the site and successfully excavated nearly a complete skeleton. In 1936, he presented the Desmostylus fossils to Emperor Shōwa during the Imperial Army Grand Maneuvers visit to Hokkaido. Later, dinosaur fossils were found in Sakhalin, prompting Nagao to return for further excavations. The fossils were later named Nipponosaurus.

In February 1938, Nagao became president of the Palaeontological Society of Japan and served for one year. In 1941, he returned to his alma mater, Tohoku Imperial University, as a professor of East Asian geology. However, he developed stomach cancer and died on August 28, 1943, at the age of 52.

== Personal life ==
Nagao held a third-degree black belt in kendo and also enjoyed performing Noh chanting of the Hōshō school.
