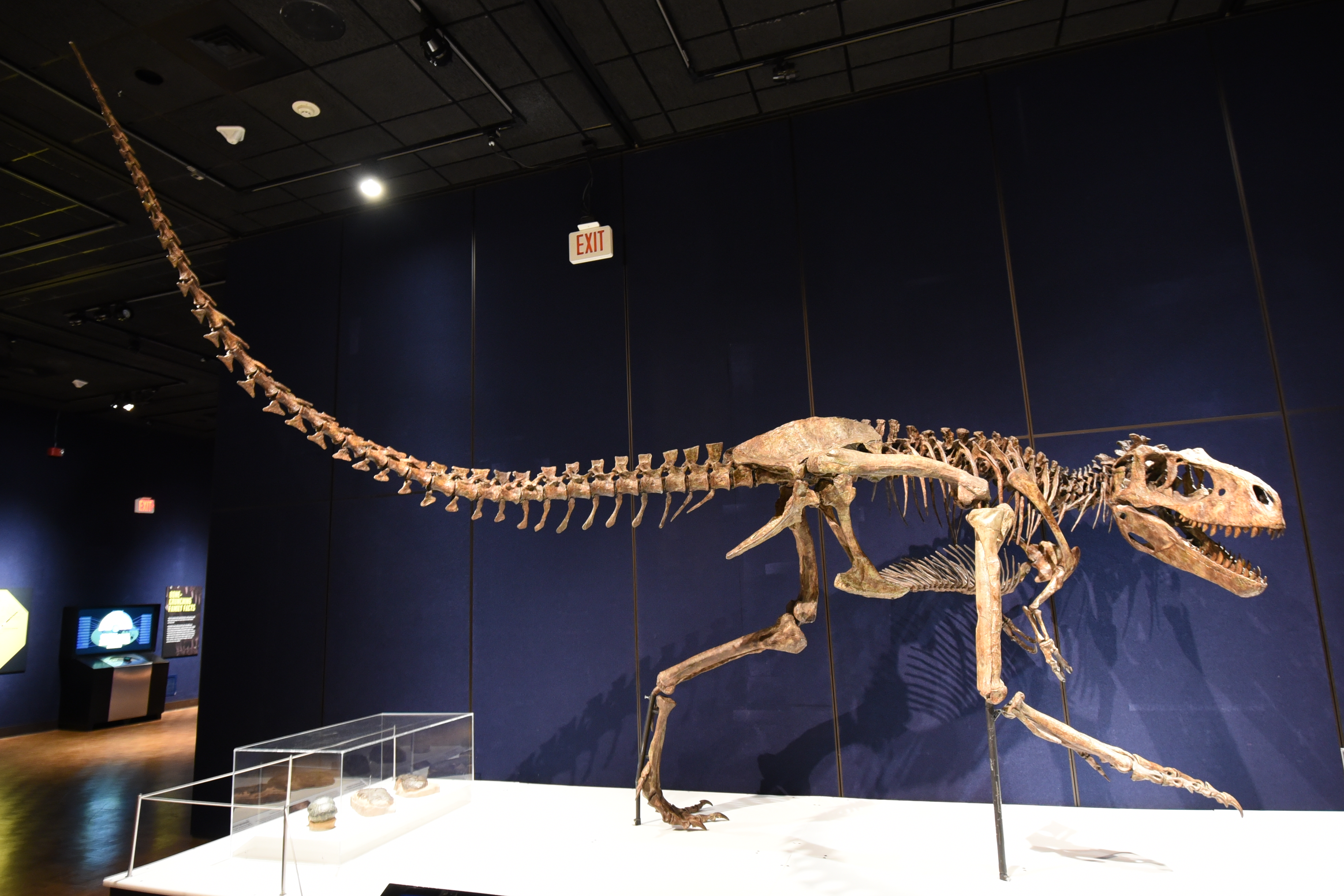
- Mounted cast in the Milwaukee Public Museum

Scientific classification
- Kingdom: Animalia
- Phylum: Chordata
- Class: Reptilia
- Clade: Dinosauria
- Clade: Saurischia
- Clade: Theropoda
- Superfamily: †Tyrannosauroidea
- Family: †Tyrannosauridae
- Subfamily: †Albertosaurinae
- Genus: †Albertosaurus; Osborn, 1905
- Species: †A. sarcophagus

Binomial name
- †Albertosaurus sarcophagus Osborn, 1905

Synonyms
- Deinodon sarcophagus (Osborn, 1905) Matthew & Brown, 1922; Albertosaurus arctunguis Parks, 1928; Deinodon arctunguis (Parks, 1928) Kuhn, 1939

= Albertosaurus =

Albertosaurus Temporal range: Late Cretaceous, (latest Campanian–early Maastrichtian), ~73–68 Ma (Possible earlier Campanian record)

Genus of bipedal predatory dinosaur

Albertosaurus (/ælˌbɜːrtəˈsɔːrəs/; meaning "Alberta lizard") is a genus of large tyrannosaurid dinosaur that lived in northwestern North America during the Latest Campanian to middle Maastrichtian age of the Late Cretaceous period, about 71 million years ago. The type species, A. sarcophagus, was apparently restricted in range to the modern-day Canadian province of Alberta, after which the genus is named, although an indeterminate species ("cf. Albertosaurus sp.") has been discovered in the Corral de Enmedio and Packard Formations of Mexico. Scientists disagree on the content of the genus and some recognize Gorgosaurus libratus as a second species.

As a tyrannosaurid, Albertosaurus was a bipedal predator with short arms, two-fingered hands, and a massive head with dozens of large, sharp teeth, a strong sense of smell, powerful binocular vision, and a bone crushing bite force. It may have even been the apex predator in its local ecosystem. While Albertosaurus was certainly large for a theropod, it was still much smaller than its larger and more famous relative Tyrannosaurus, growing up to 8–9 metres (26–30 ft) in length and weighing 1.7–3.0 metric tons (1.9–3.3 short tons).

Since the first discovery in 1884, fossils of more than 30 individuals have been recovered that provide scientists with a more detailed knowledge of Albertosaurus anatomy than what is available for most other tyrannosaurids. The discovery of 26 individuals in one particular site provides evidence of gregarious behavior and allows for studies of ontogeny and population biology. These are near impossible with lesser-known dinosaurs because their remains are rarer and more fragmentary when compared to those of Albertosaurus.

== History of discovery ==
=== Naming ===
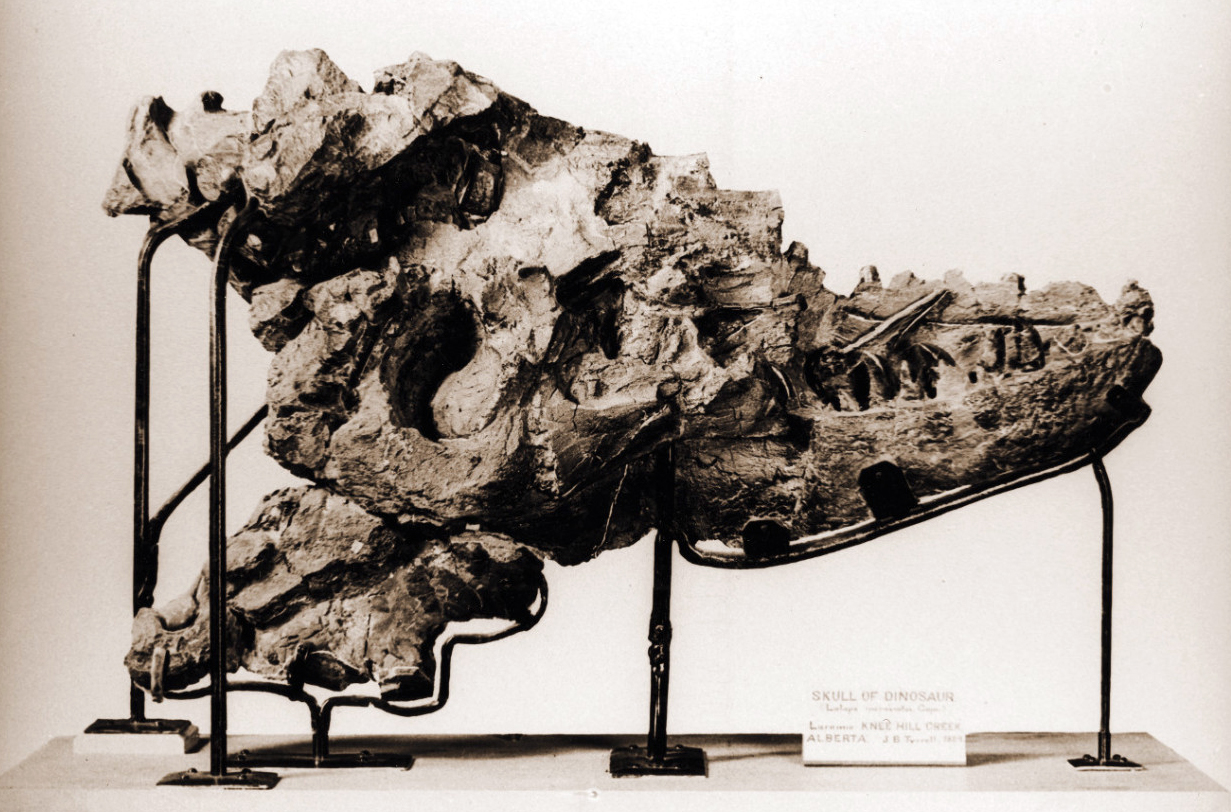
Holotype specimen CMN 5600

Albertosaurus was named by Henry Fairfield Osborn in a one-page note at the end of his 1905 description of Tyrannosaurus. Its namesake is Alberta, the Canadian province established the very same year where the first remains were found. The generic name also incorporates the Greek word σαυρος/sauros, meaning "lizard", which is the most common suffix in dinosaur names. The type species is Albertosaurus sarcophagus and the specific name is derived from the Ancient Greek term σαρκοφάγος (sarkophagos), meaning "flesh-eating", and having the same etymology as the funeral container with which it shares its name, which is a combination of the Greek words σαρξ/sarx ("flesh") and φαγειν/phagein ("to eat"). More than 30 specimens of all ages are known to science.

=== Early discoveries ===
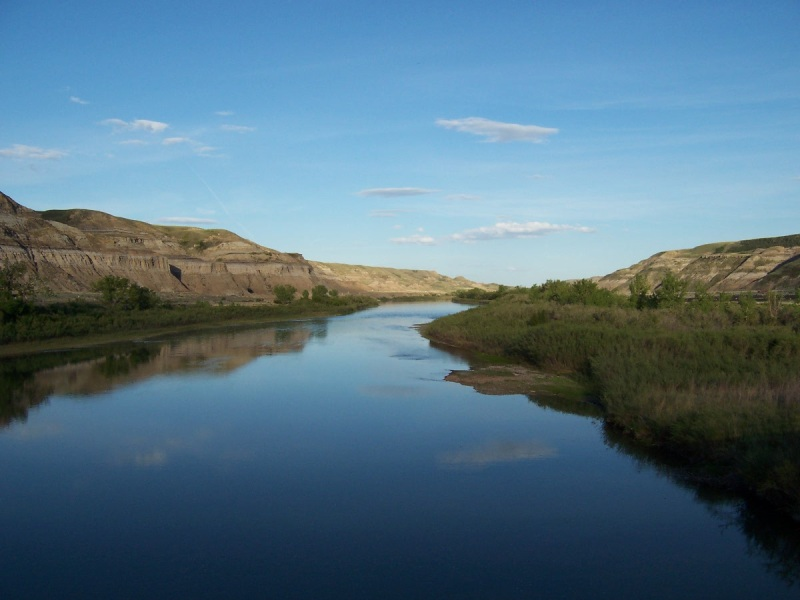
The Red Deer River near Drumheller, Alberta. Almost three-quarters of all Albertosaurus remains have been discovered alongside the river, in outcrops like the ones on either side of this picture.

The type specimen is a partial skull collected on June 9, 1884, from an outcrop of the Horseshoe Canyon Formation alongside the Red Deer River in Alberta. It was recovered by an expedition of the Geological Survey of Canada, led by the famous geologist Joseph Burr Tyrrell. Due to a lack of specialised equipment, the almost complete skull could only be partially secured. In 1889, Tyrrell's colleague Thomas Chesmer Weston found an incomplete smaller skull associated with some skeletal material at a location nearby. The two skulls were assigned to the preexisting species Laelaps incrassatus by Edward Drinker Cope in 1892. Although the name Laelaps was preoccupied by a genus of mite and had been changed to Dryptosaurus in 1877 by Othniel Charles Marsh, Cope stubbornly refused to recognize the new name created by his archrival. However, Lawrence Lambe used the name Dryptosaurus incrassatus instead of Laelaps incrassatus when he described the remains in detail in 1903 and 1904, which was a combination first coined by Oliver Perry Hay in 1902.

Shortly later, Osborn pointed out that D. incrassatus was based on generic tyrannosaurid teeth, so the two Horseshoe Canyon skulls could not be confidently referred to that species. The Horseshoe Canyon skulls also differed markedly from the remains of D. aquilunguis, type species of Dryptosaurus, so Osborn gave them the new name Albertosaurus sarcophagus in 1905. He did not describe the remains in any great detail, citing Lambe's complete description the year before. Both specimens, the holotype CMN 5600 and the paratype CMN 5601, are stored in the Canadian Museum of Nature in Ottawa. By the early twenty-first century, some concerns had arisen that, due to the damaged state of the holotype, Albertosaurus might be a nomen dubium that could only be used for the type specimen itself because other fossils could not reliably be assigned to it. However, in 2010, Thomas Carr established that the holotype, the paratype, and comparable later finds all shared a single common unique trait, or autapomorphy. The possession of an enlarged pneumatic opening in the back rim of the side of the palatine bone proves that Albertosaurus is a valid taxon.

=== Dry Island bone bed ===
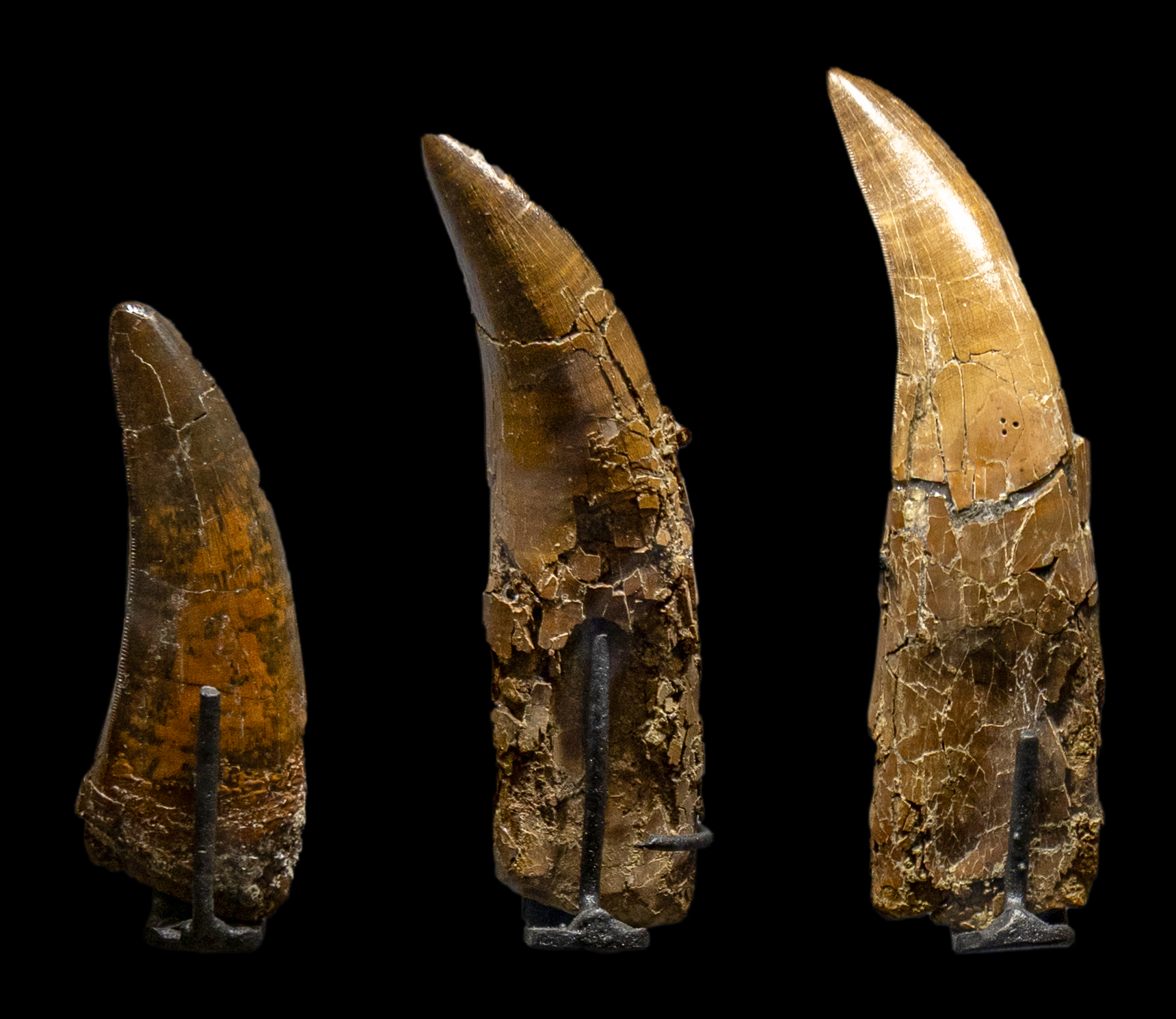
Teeth from Dry Island and Drumheller, Royal Tyrrell Museum

On August 11, 1910, American paleontologist Barnum Brown discovered the remains of a large group of Albertosaurus at another quarry alongside the Red Deer River. Because of the large number of bones and the limited time available, Brown's party did not collect every specimen, but made sure to collect remains from all of the individuals that they could identify in the bone bed. Among the bones deposited in the American Museum of Natural History collections in New York City are seven sets of right metatarsals, along with two isolated toe bones that did not match any of the metatarsals in size. This indicated the presence of at least nine individuals in the quarry. Palaeontologist Philip J. Currie of the Royal Tyrrell Museum of Palaeontology rediscovered the bonebed in 1997 and resumed fieldwork at the site, which is now located inside Dry Island Buffalo Jump Provincial Park. Further excavation from 1997 to 2005 turned up the remains of 13 more individuals of various ages, including a diminutive two-year-old and a very old individual estimated at over 10 metres (33 feet) long. None of these individuals are known from complete skeletons and most are represented by remains in both museums. Excavations continued until 2008, when the minimum number of individuals present had been established at 12 (on the basis of preserved elements that occur only once in a skeleton) and at 26 if mirrored elements were counted when differing in size due to ontogeny. A total of 1,128 Albertosaurus bones had been secured, which is the largest concentration of large theropod fossils known from the Cretaceous.

=== Other discoveries ===
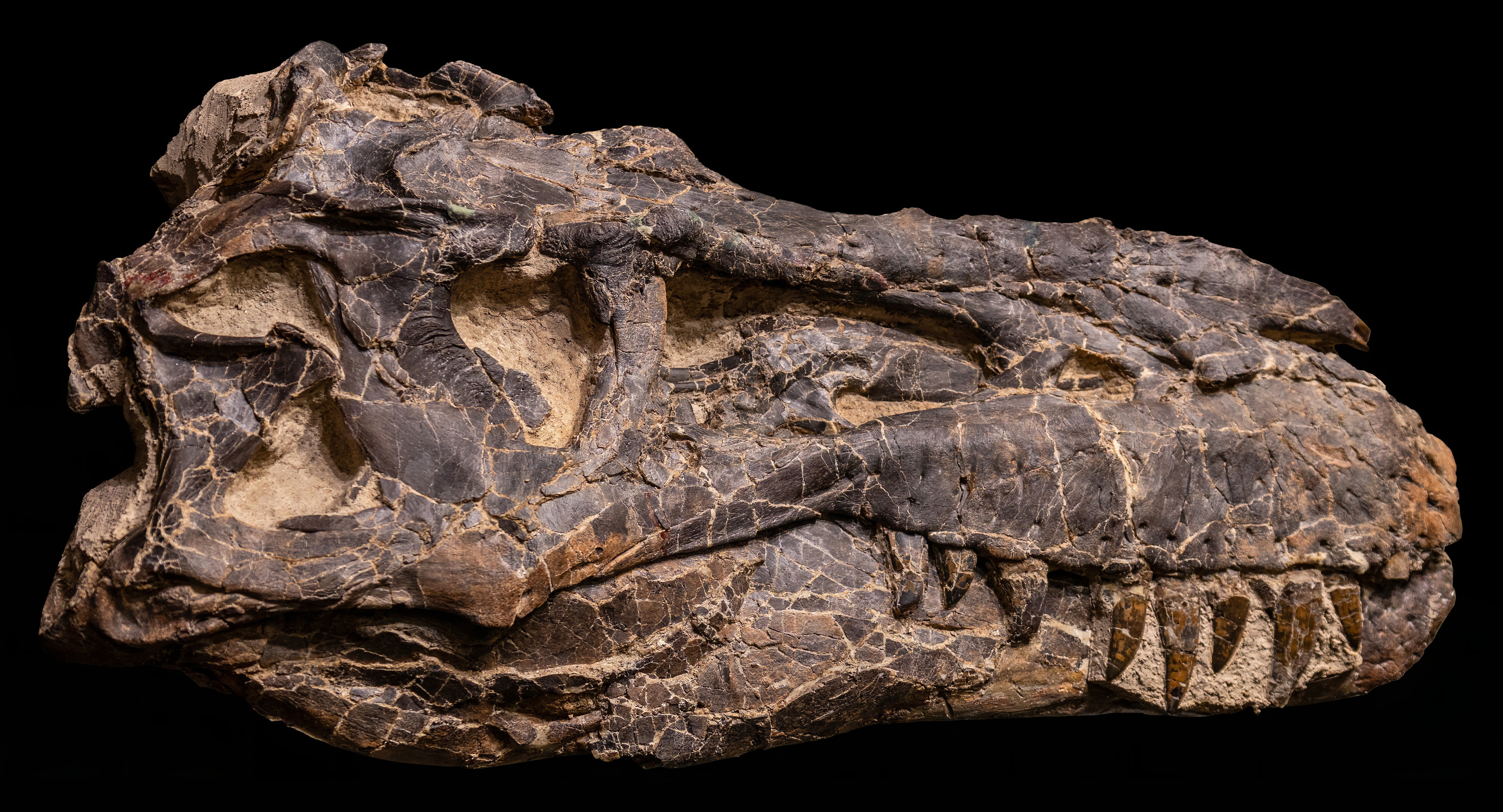
Skull TMP 1985 098 0001

In 1911, Barnum Brown, during the second year of the American Museum of Natural History's operations in Alberta, uncovered a fragmentary partial Albertosaurus skull at the Red Deer River near Tolman Bridge (specimen AMNH 5222).

William Parks described a new species in 1928, Albertosaurus arctunguis, based on a partial skeleton lacking a skull that was excavated by Gus Lindblad and Ralph Hornell near the Red Deer River in 1923, but this species has been considered identical to A. sarcophagus since 1970. Parks' specimen (ROM 807) is housed in the Royal Ontario Museum in Toronto.

No Albertosaurus fossils were found from 1926 to 1972, but there has been an increase in findings since then. Apart from the Dry Island bonebed, six more skulls and skeletons have since been discovered in Alberta and are housed in various Canadian museums. Specimen RTMP 81.010.001 was found in 1978 by amateur paleontologist Maurice Stefanuk. RTMP 85.098.001 was found by Stefanuk on June 16, 1985. RTMP 86.64.001 was found in December 1985. RTMP 86.205.001 was found in 1986. RTMP 97.058.0001 was found in 1996 and then there is CMN 11315. Unfortunately, none of these skeletons were found with complete skulls. Fossils have also been reported from the American states of Montana, New Mexico, Wyoming, and Missouri, but they are doubted to be from A. sarcophagus and may not even belong to the genus Albertosaurus.

Two specimens from "cf Albertosaurus ".sp" have been found in Mexico (Packard Formation and Corral de Enmedio Formation).

=== Gorgosaurus libratus ===
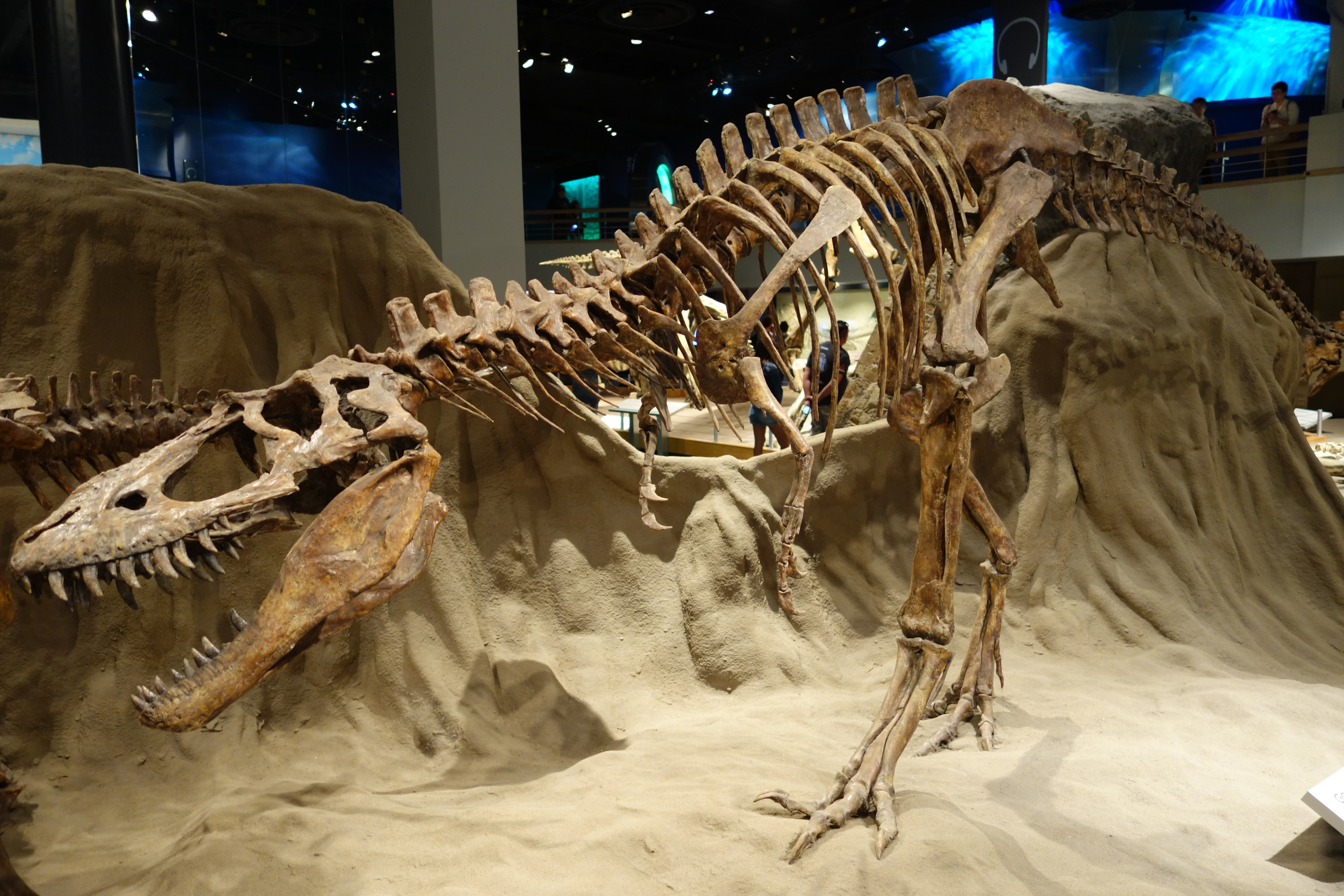
Gorgosaurus, which was described as a second species of Albertosaurus, A. libratus by Dale Russell.

In 1913, paleontologist Charles H. Sternberg recovered another tyrannosaurid skeleton from the slightly older Dinosaur Park Formation in Alberta. Lawrence Lambe named this dinosaur Gorgosaurus libratus in 1914. Other specimens were later found in Alberta and the US state of Montana. Finding no significant differences to separate the two taxa (due mostly to a lack of good Albertosaurus skull material), Dale Russell declared the name Gorgosaurus a junior synonym of Albertosaurus, which had been named first, and G. libratus was renamed Albertosaurus libratus in 1970. A species distinction was maintained because of the age difference. The addition extended the temporal range of the genus Albertosaurus earlier by several million years and its geographic range southwards by hundreds of kilometres.

In 2003, Philip J. Currie, benefiting from much more extensive finds and a general increase in anatomical knowledge of theropods, compared several tyrannosaurid skulls and came to the conclusion that the two species are more distinct than previously thought. As the two species are sister taxa, they are more closely related to each other than to any other species of tyrannosaurid. Recognizing this, Currie nevertheless recommended that Albertosaurus and Gorgosaurus be kept as separate genera, as he concluded that they were no more similar than Daspletosaurus and Tyrannosaurus, which are almost always separated. In addition to this, several albertosaurine specimens have been recovered from Alaska and New Mexico. Currie suggested that the Albertosaurus-Gorgosaurus situation may be clarified once these are fully described. Most authors have followed Currie's recommendation, but some have not.

=== Other species ===
In 1930, Anatoly Nikolaevich Riabinin named Albertosaurus pericolosus based on a tooth from China that probably belonged to Tarbosaurus. In 1932, Friedrich von Huene renamed Dryptosaurus incrassatus, not considered a nomen dubium by him, to Albertosaurus incrassatus. Because he had identified Gorgosaurus with Albertosaurus, in 1970, Russell also renamed Gorgosaurus sternbergi (Matthew & Brown 1922) into Albertosaurus sternbergi and Gorgosaurus lancensis (Gilmore 1946) into Albertosaurus lancensis. The former species is today seen as a juvenile form of Gorgosaurus libratus and the latter is seen as either identical to Tyrannosaurus or representing a separate genus, Nanotyrannus. In 1988, Gregory S. Paul based Albertosaurus megagracilis on a small tyrannosaurid skeleton, specimen LACM 28345, from the Hell Creek Formation of Montana. It was renamed Dinotyrannus in 1995, but is now thought to represent a juvenile Tyrannosaurus. Also in 1988, Paul renamed Alectrosaurus olseni (Gilmore 1933) into Albertosaurus olseni, but this has found no general acceptance. In 1989, Gorgosaurus novojilovi (Maleev 1955) was renamed by Bryn Mader and Robert Bradley as Albertosaurus novojilovi.

On two occasions, species based on valid Albertosaurus material were reassigned to a different genus, Deinodon. In 1922, William Diller Matthew renamed A. sarcophagus into Deinodon sarcophagus. In 1939, German paleontologist Oskar Kuhn renamed A. arctunguis into Deinodon arctunguis.

== Description ==
Size comparison

Albertosaurus was a fairly large bipedal predator, but smaller than Tarbosaurus and Tyrannosaurus. Typical Albertosaurus adults measured up to 8–9 m (26–30 ft) long and weighed between 1.7 and 3.0 metric tons (1.9 and 3.3 short tons) in body mass.

Albertosaurus shared a similar body appearance with all other tyrannosaurids, Gorgosaurus in particular. Typical for a theropod, Albertosaurus was bipedal and balanced its large, heavy head and torso with a long, muscular tail. However, tyrannosaurid forelimbs were extremely small for their body size and retained only two functional fingers, the second being longer than the first. The legs were long and ended in a four-toed foot on which the first toe, the hallux, was very short and did not reach the ground. The third toe was longer than the rest. Albertosaurus may have been able to reach walking speeds of 14–21 km/hour (8–13 mi/hour). At least for the younger individuals, a high running speed is plausible.

Two skin impressions from Albertosaurus are known, and both show scales. One patch was found associated with some gastralic ribs and the impression of a long, unknown bone, indicating that the patch is from the belly. The scales are pebbly and gradually become larger and somewhat hexagonal in shape. Also preserved are two larger feature scales, placed 4.5 centimeters apart from each other, making Albertosaurus, along with Carnotaurus, the only known theropods with preserved feature scales. Another skin impression is from an unknown part of the body. These scales are small, diamond-shaped, and arranged in rows.

=== Skull and teeth ===
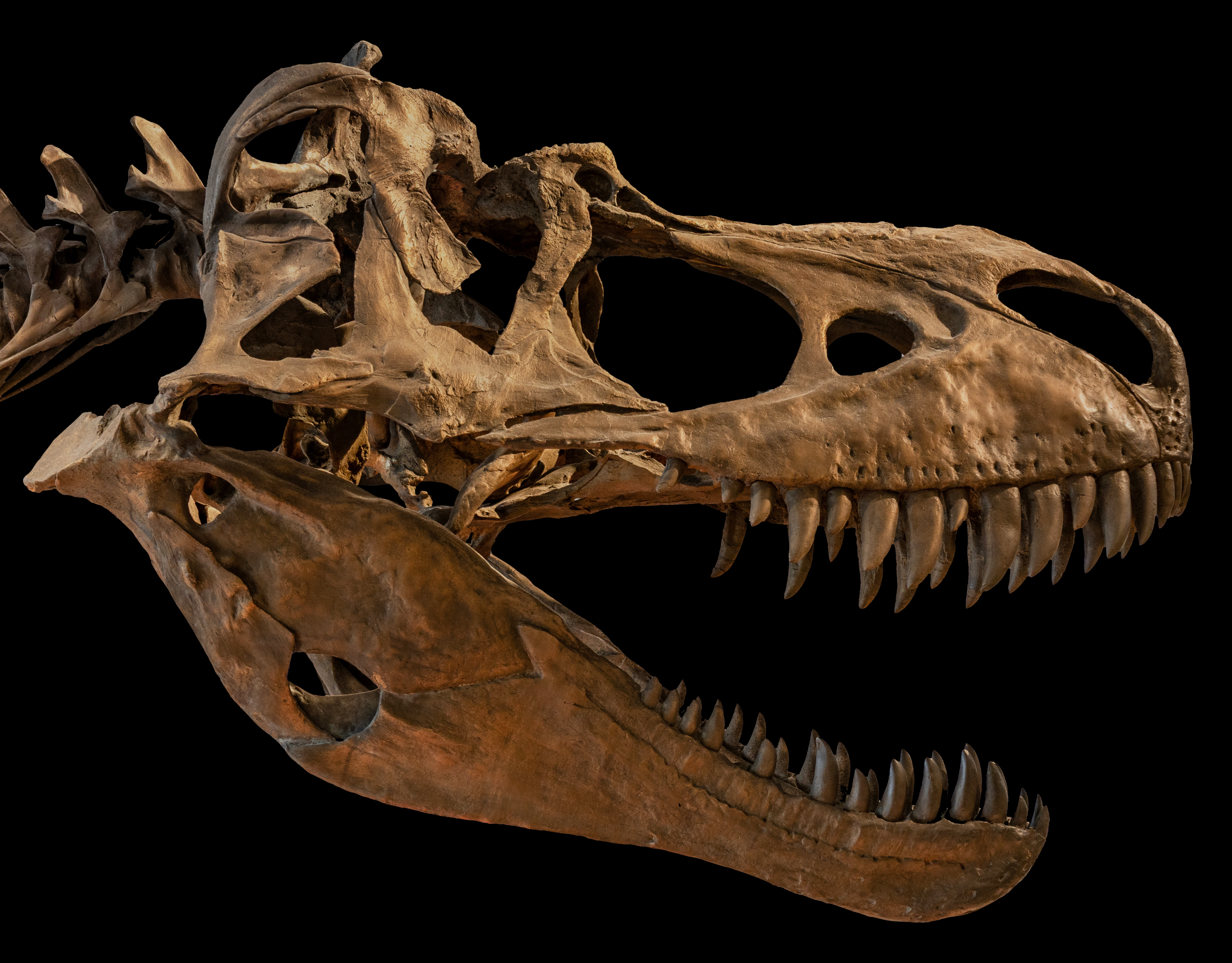
Skull cast at the Royal Tyrrell Museum of Palaeontology in Drumheller, Alberta

The massive skull of Albertosaurus, which was perched on a muscular, short, S-shaped neck, was about 1 metre (3.3 feet) long in the largest adults. Wide openings in the skull, called fenestrae, provided space for muscle attachment sites and sensory organs that reduced its overall weight. Its long jaws contained, both sides combined, 58 or more banana-shaped teeth. Larger tyrannosaurids possessed fewer teeth, but Gorgosaurus had 62. Unlike most theropods, Albertosaurus and other tyrannosaurids were heterodont, with teeth of different forms depending on their position in the mouth. The premaxillary teeth at the tip of the upper jaw, four per side, were much smaller than the rest, more closely packed, and D-shaped in cross section. Like with Tyrannosaurus, the maxillary (cheek) teeth of Albertosaurus were adapted in general form to resist lateral forces exerted by a struggling prey animal. The bite force of Albertosaurus was less formidable, however, with the maximum force, by the back teeth, reaching 3,413 Newtons. Above the eyes were short bony crests that may have been brightly coloured in life and possibly used, by males in particular, in courtship to attract a mate.

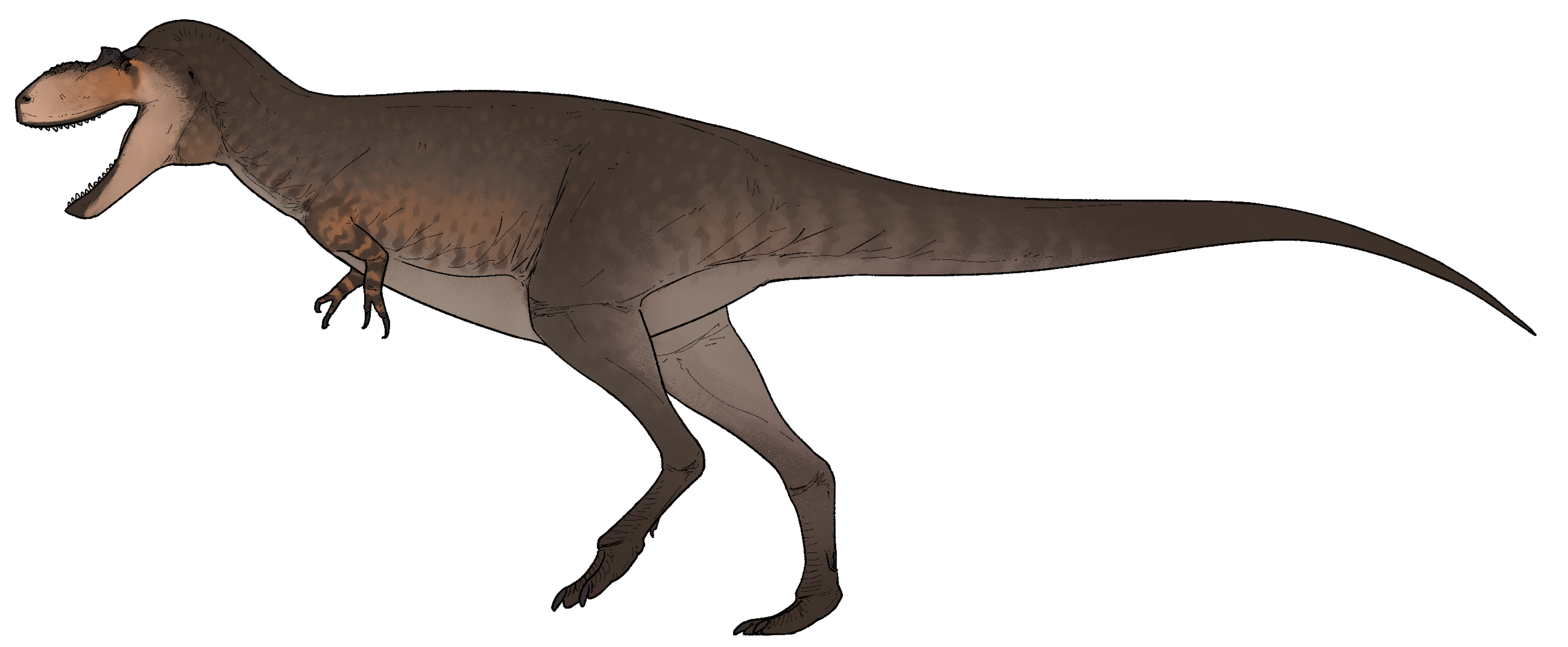
Life restoration

In 2001, William Abler observed that Albertosaurus tooth serrations resemble a crack in the tooth ending in a round void called an ampulla. Tyrannosaurid teeth were used as holdfasts for pulling flesh off a body, so when a tyrannosaur pulled back on a piece of meat, the tension could cause a purely crack-like serration to spread through the tooth. However, the presence of the ampulla distributed these forces over a larger surface area and lessened the risk of damage to the tooth under strain. The presence of incisions ending in voids has parallels in human engineering. Guitar makers use incisions ending in voids to, as Abler describes, "impart alternating regions of flexibility and rigidity" to wood that they work on. The use of a drill to create an "ampulla" of sorts and prevent the propagation of cracks through material is also used to protect aircraft surfaces. Abler demonstrated that a plexiglass bar with incisions called "kerfs" and drilled holes was more than 25% stronger than one with only regularly placed incisions. Unlike tyrannosaurs, more ancient predators, like phytosaurs and Dimetrodon, had no adaptations to prevent the crack-like serrations of their teeth from spreading when subjected to the forces of feeding.

== Classification and systematics ==
Albertosaurus is a member of the theropod family Tyrannosauridae, specifically the subfamily Albertosaurinae. Its closest relative is the slightly older Gorgosaurus libratus (sometimes called Albertosaurus libratus; see below). These two species are the only described albertosaurines, but other undescribed species may exist. Thomas Holtz found Appalachiosaurus to be an albertosaurine in 2004, but his more recent unpublished work places it as a basal eotyrannosaurian just outside of Tyrannosauridae, in agreement with other authors.

The other major subfamily of tyrannosaurids is Tyrannosaurinae, which includes members like Daspletosaurus, Tarbosaurus, and Tyrannosaurus. Compared with the more robust tyrannosaurines, albertosaurines had slender builds, with proportionately smaller skulls and longer bones of the lower legs (tibia) and feet (metatarsals and phalanges).

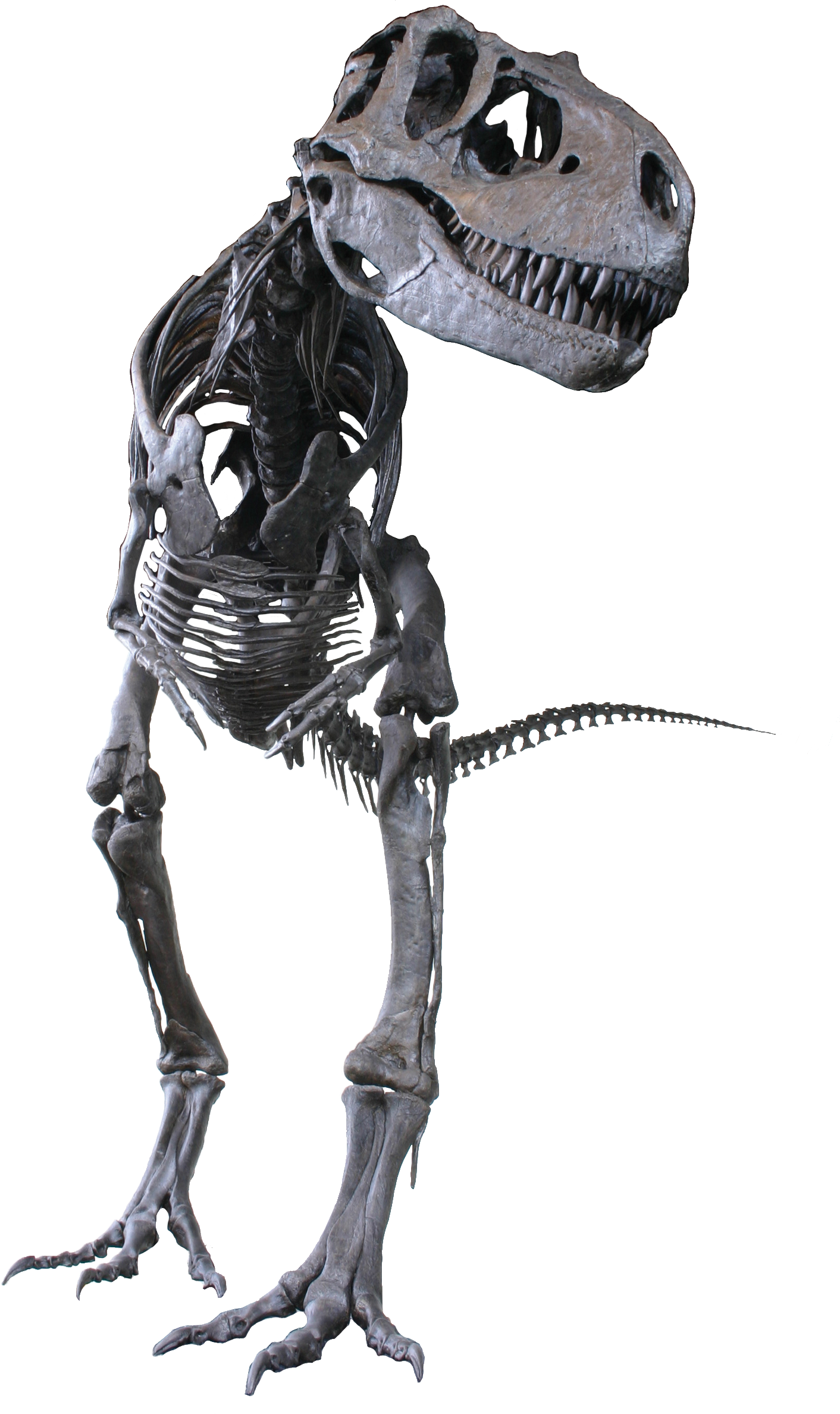
Cast in the Rocky Mountain Dinosaur Resource Center in Woodland Park, Colorado

Below is the cladogram of Tyrannosauridae based on the phylogenetic analysis conducted by Loewen et al. in 2013.

- Tyrannosauridae
  - - Gorgosaurus libratus
    - Albertosaurus sarcophagus
  - Tyrannosaurinae
    - Dinosaur Park tyrannosaurid
    - - Daspletosaurus torosus
      - - Daspletosaurus horneri
        - - Teratophoneus curriei
          - - Bistahieversor sealeyi
            - - Lythronax argestes
              - - Tyrannosaurus rex
                - - Tarbosaurus bataar
                  - Zhuchengtyrannus magnus

== Palaeobiology ==
=== Growth pattern ===
A graph showing the hypothesized growth curves (body mass versus age) of four tyrannosaurids, with Albertosaurus drawn in red

Most age categories of Albertosaurus are represented in the fossil record. Using bone histology, the age of an individual animal at the time of death can often be determined, allowing growth rates to be estimated and compared with other species. The youngest known Albertosaurus is a two-year-old discovered in the Dry Island bonebed, which would have weighed about 50 kilograms (110 lb) and measured slightly more than 2 metres (6.6 feet) long. The 10 metres (33 feet) specimen from the same quarry is 28 years old, the oldest and largest one known. When specimens of intermediate age and size are plotted on a graph, an S-shaped growth curve results, with the most rapid growth occurring in a four-year period ending around the sixteenth year of life, a pattern also seen in other tyrannosaurids. The growth rate during this phase was 122 kilograms (269 pounds) per year, based on an adult weighing 1.3 tonnes. Other studies have suggested higher adult weights, which would affect the magnitude of the growth rate, but not the overall pattern. Tyrannosaurids similar in size to Albertosaurus had similar growth rates, although the much larger Tyrannosaurus grew at almost five times this rate (601 kilograms [1,325 pounds] per year) at its peak. The end of the rapid growth phase suggests the onset of sexual maturity in Albertosaurus, although growth continued at a slower rate throughout the animals' lives. Sexual maturation while still actively growing appears to be a shared trait among small and large dinosaurs, as well as in large mammals like humans and elephants. This pattern of relatively early sexual maturation differs strikingly from the pattern in birds, which delay their sexual maturity until after they have finished growing.

During growth, thickening of the tooth morphology changed so much that, had the association of young and adult skeletons on the Dry Island bonebed not proven that they belonged to the same taxon, the teeth of juveniles would likely have been identified by statistical analysis as those of a different species.

=== Life history ===
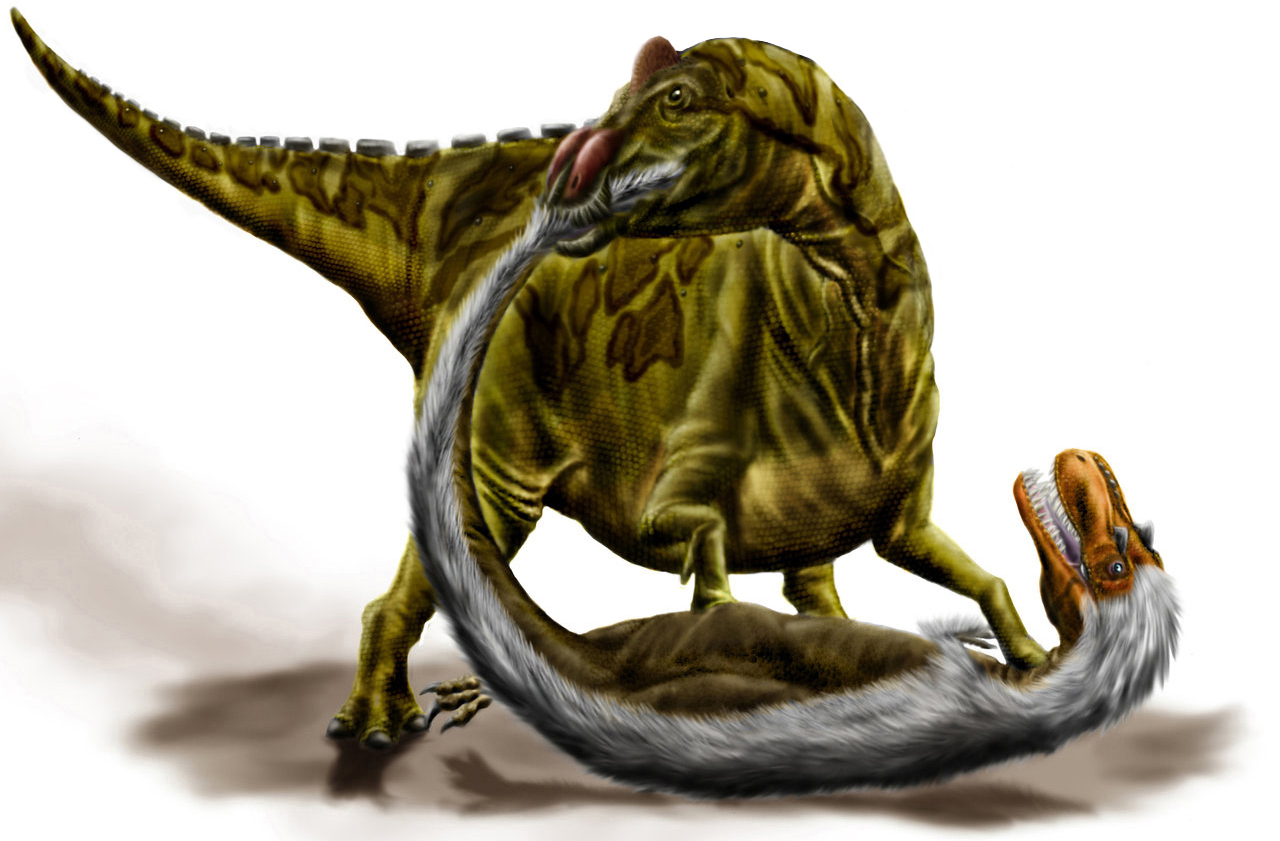
Restoration of Edmontosaurus fighting off Albertosaurus

Most known Albertosaurus individuals were aged 14 years or older at the time of death. Juvenile animals are rarely fossilized for several reasons, mainly preservation bias, where the smaller bones of younger animals were less likely to be preserved by fossilization than the larger bones of adults, and collection bias, where smaller fossils are less likely to be noticed by collectors in the field. Young Albertosaurus are relatively large for juvenile animals, but their remains are still rare in the fossil record when compared to adults. It has been suggested that this phenomenon is a consequence of life history, rather than bias, and that fossils of juvenile Albertosaurus are rare because they simply did not die as often as adults did.

A hypothesis of Albertosaurus life history postulates that hatchlings died in large numbers, but have not been preserved in the fossil record because of their small size and fragile construction. After just two years, juveniles were larger than any other predator in the region, aside from adult Albertosaurus, and more fleet-footed than most of their prey animals. This resulted in a dramatic decrease in their mortality rate and a corresponding rarity of fossil remains. Mortality rates doubled at age twelve, perhaps the result of the physiological demands of the rapid growth phase, and then doubled again with the onset of sexual maturity between the ages of fourteen and sixteen. This elevated mortality rate continued throughout adulthood, perhaps due to the high physiological demands of procreation, including stress and injuries received during intraspecific competition for mates and resources, and the eventual, ever-increasing effects of senescence. The higher mortality rate in adults may explain their more common preservation. Very large animals were rare because few individuals survived long enough to attain such size. High infant mortality rates, followed by reduced mortality among juveniles and a sudden increase in mortality after sexual maturity, with very few animals reaching maximum size, is a pattern observed in many modern large mammals, including elephants, African buffalo, and rhinoceros. The same pattern is also seen in other tyrannosaurids. The comparison with modern animals and other tyrannosaurids lends support to this life history hypothesis, but bias in the fossil record may still play a large role, especially since more than two-thirds of all Albertosaurus specimens are known from the exact same locality.

=== Social behaviour ===
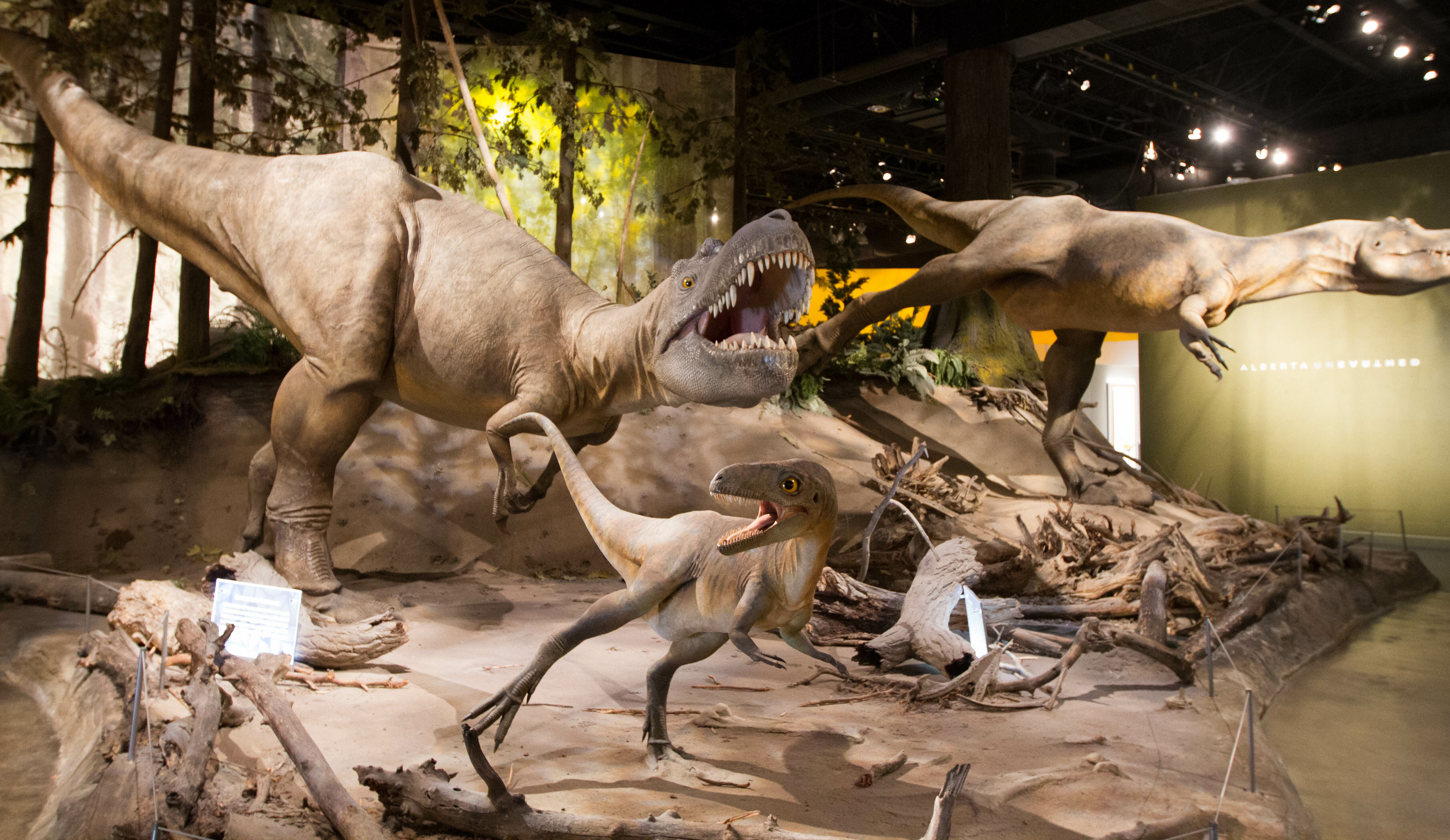
Bronze sculptures of a pack, RTM, designed by Brian Cooley

The Dry Island bonebed discovered by Barnum Brown and his crew contains the remains of 26 Albertosaurus, the most individuals found in one locality of any large Cretaceous theropod and the second-most of any large theropod dinosaur behind the Allosaurus assemblage at the Cleveland-Lloyd Dinosaur Quarry in Utah. The group seems to be composed of one very old adult, eight adults between 17 and 23 years old, seven sub-adults undergoing their rapid growth phases at between 12 and 16 years old, and six juveniles between the ages of 2 and 11 years old that had not yet reached the growth phase.

The near-absence of herbivore remains and the similar state of preservation common to the many individuals at the Albertosaurus bonebed quarry led Currie to conclude that the locality was not a predator trap, such as the La Brea Tar Pits in California, and that all of the preserved animals died at the same time. Currie claims this as evidence of pack behavior. Other scientists are skeptical, observing that the animals may have been driven together by a drought, flood, or other reasons.

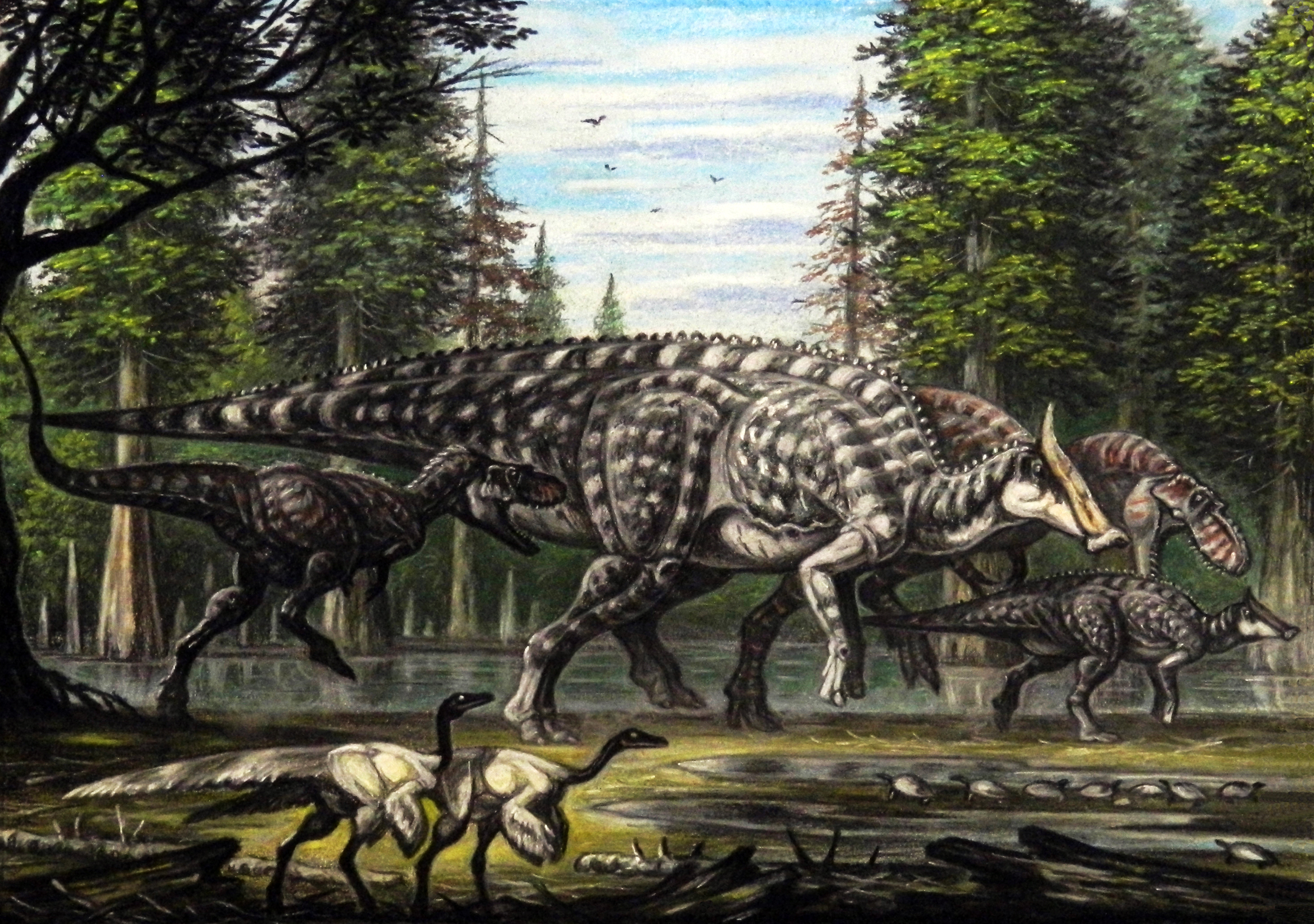
Two Albertosaurus hunting Saurolophus

There is plentiful evidence for gregarious behaviour among herbivorous dinosaurs, including ceratopsians and hadrosaurs. However, only rarely are so many dinosaurian predators found at the same site. Small theropods, like Deinonychus and Coelophysis, have been found in aggregations, as have larger predators, such as Allosaurus and Mapusaurus. There is some evidence of gregarious behaviour in other tyrannosaurids as well, as fragmentary remains of smaller individuals were found alongside "Sue", the Tyrannosaurus mounted in the Field Museum of Natural History in Chicago, and a bonebed in the Two Medicine Formation of Montana contains at least three specimens of Daspletosaurus preserved alongside several hadrosaurs. These findings may corroborate the evidence for social behaviour in Albertosaurus, although some or all of the above localities may represent temporary or unnatural aggregations. Others have speculated that, instead of social groups, at least some of these finds represent Komodo dragon-like mobbing of carcasses, where aggressive competition leads to some of the predators being killed and even cannibalized. The evidence of cannibalism was later reported in 2024 by Coppock and Currie. The evidence consisted of tooth traces found on the medial surface of a pubis attributed to an albertosaurine, which given the lack of other albertosaurine species in the assemblage almost certainly reflected another A. sarcophagus. These bite traces show no signs of healing and thus strongly indicate that they were made post-mortem and represent feeding marks as opposed to injuries sustained during intraspecific combat.

Currie has also speculated on the pack-hunting habits of Albertosaurus. The leg proportions of the smaller individuals were comparable to those of ornithomimids, which were probably among the fastest dinosaurs. Younger Albertosaurus were probably equally fleet-footed or at least faster than their prey. Currie hypothesized that the younger members of the pack may have been responsible for driving their prey towards the adults, who were larger and more powerful, but also slower. Juveniles may also have had different lifestyles than adults, filling predator niches between the enormous adults and the smaller contemporaneous theropods, the largest of which were two orders of magnitude smaller than adult Albertosaurus in mass. A similar situation is observed in modern Komodo dragons, with hatchlings beginning life as small insectivores before growing to become the dominant predators on their islands. However, as the preservation of behaviour in the fossil record is exceedingly rare, these ideas cannot readily be tested. In 2010, Currie, though still favouring the hunting pack hypothesis, admitted that the concentration could have been brought about by other causes, such as a slowly rising water level during an extended flood.

=== Palaeopathology ===
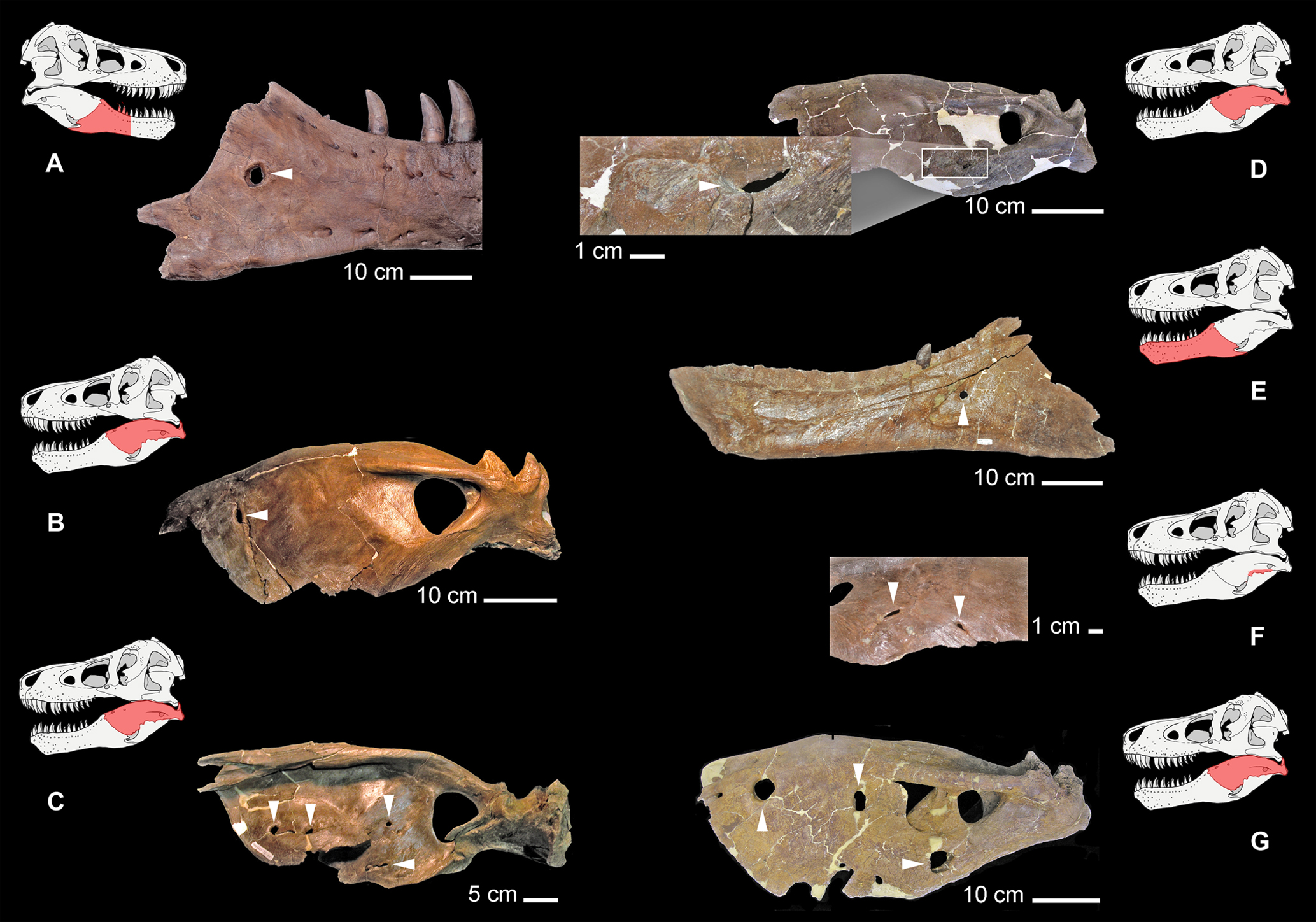
Tyrannosaur jaw-bones with trichomonosis-type lesions; D (upper right) is Albertosaurus

In 2009, researchers hypothesized that smooth-edged holes found in the fossil jaws of tyrannosaurid dinosaurs, such as Albertosaurus, were caused by a parasite similar to Trichomonas gallinae, which infects birds. They suggested that tyrannosaurids transmitted the infection by biting each other and that the infection impaired their ability to eat.

In 2001, Bruce Rothschild and others published a study examining evidence for stress fractures and tendon avulsions in theropod dinosaurs and the implications for their behavior. They found that only one of the 319 Albertosaurus foot bones checked for stress fractures actually had them and none of the four hand bones did. The scientists found that stress fractures were "significantly" less common in Albertosaurus than in the carnosaur Allosaurus. ROM 807, the holotype of A. arctunguis (now referred to A. sarcophagus), had a 2.5 by 3.5 cm (0.98 by 1.38 in) deep hole in the iliac blade, although the describer of the species did not recognize this as pathological. The specimen also contains some exostosis on the fourth left metatarsal. In 1970, two of the five Albertosaurus sarcophagus specimens with humeri were reported by Dale Russel as having pathological damage to them.

In 2010, the health of the Dry Island Albertosaurus assembly was reported upon. Most specimens showed no sign of disease. On three phalanges of the foot, strange bony spurs that consisted of abnormal ossifications of the tendons, so-called enthesophytes, were present, but their cause is unknown. Two ribs and a belly-rib showed signs of breaking and healing. One adult specimen had a left lower jaw showing a puncture wound and both healed and unhealed bite marks. The low number of abnormalities compares favourably with the health condition of a Majungasaurus population of which it was established, in 2007, that 19% of individuals showed bone pathologies.

== Palaeoecology ==
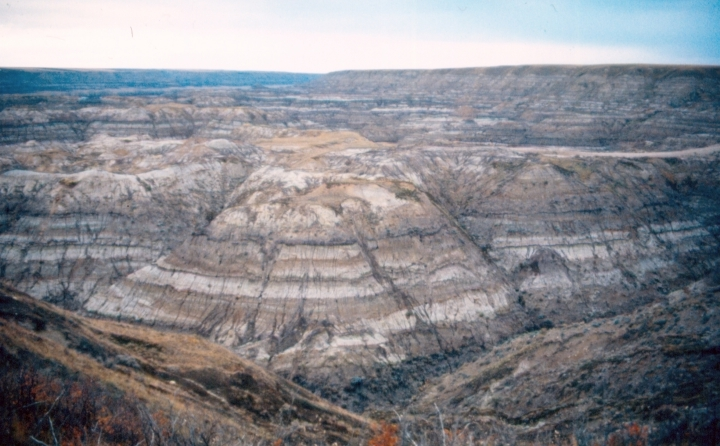
The Horseshoe Canyon Formation is exposed in its type section at Horseshoe Canyon, Alberta

Most fossils of Albertosaurus sarcophagus are known from the upper Horseshoe Canyon Formation in Alberta. These younger units of this geologic formation date to the early Maastrichtian age of the Late Cretaceous period, about 70 to 68 million years ago. Immediately below this formation is the Bearpaw Shale, a marine formation representing a section of the Western Interior Seaway. The Inland Sea was receding as the climate cooled and sea levels subsided towards the end of the Cretaceous, thus exposing land that had previously been underwater. It was not a smooth process, however, and the seaway would periodically rise to cover parts of the region throughout Horseshoe Canyon before finally receding altogether in the years after. Due to the changing sea levels, many different environments are represented in the Horseshoe Canyon Formation, including offshore and near-shore marine habitats and coastal habitats, such as lagoons, estuaries, and tidal flats. Numerous coal seams represent ancient peat swamps. Like most of the other vertebrate fossils from the formation, Albertosaurus remains are found in deposits laid down in the deltas and floodplains of large rivers during the later half of Horseshoe Canyon times.

The fauna of the Horseshoe Canyon Formation is well-known, as vertebrate fossils, including those of dinosaurs, are very common. Sharks, rays, sturgeons, bowfins, gars, and the gar-like Aspidorhynchus made up the fish fauna. Mammals included multituberculates and the marsupial Didelphodon. The saltwater plesiosaur Leurospondylus has been found in marine sediments in the Horseshoe Canyon, while freshwater environments were populated by turtles, Champsosaurus, and crocodilians like Leidyosuchus and Stangerochampsa. Dinosaurs dominate the fauna, especially hadrosaurs, which make up half of all dinosaurs known. These include the genera Edmontosaurus, Saurolophus, and Hypacrosaurus. Ceratopsians and ornithomimids were also very common, together making up another third of the known fauna. Along with much rarer ankylosaurians and pachycephalosaurs, all of these animals would have been prey for a diverse array of carnivorous theropods, including troodontids, dromaeosaurids, and caenagnathids. Intermingled with the Albertosaurus remains of the Dry Island bonebed, the bones of the small theropod Albertonykus were found. Adult Albertosaurus were the apex predators in their environment, with intermediate niches possibly filled by juvenile Albertosaurus.

== See also ==
- Timeline of tyrannosaur research
