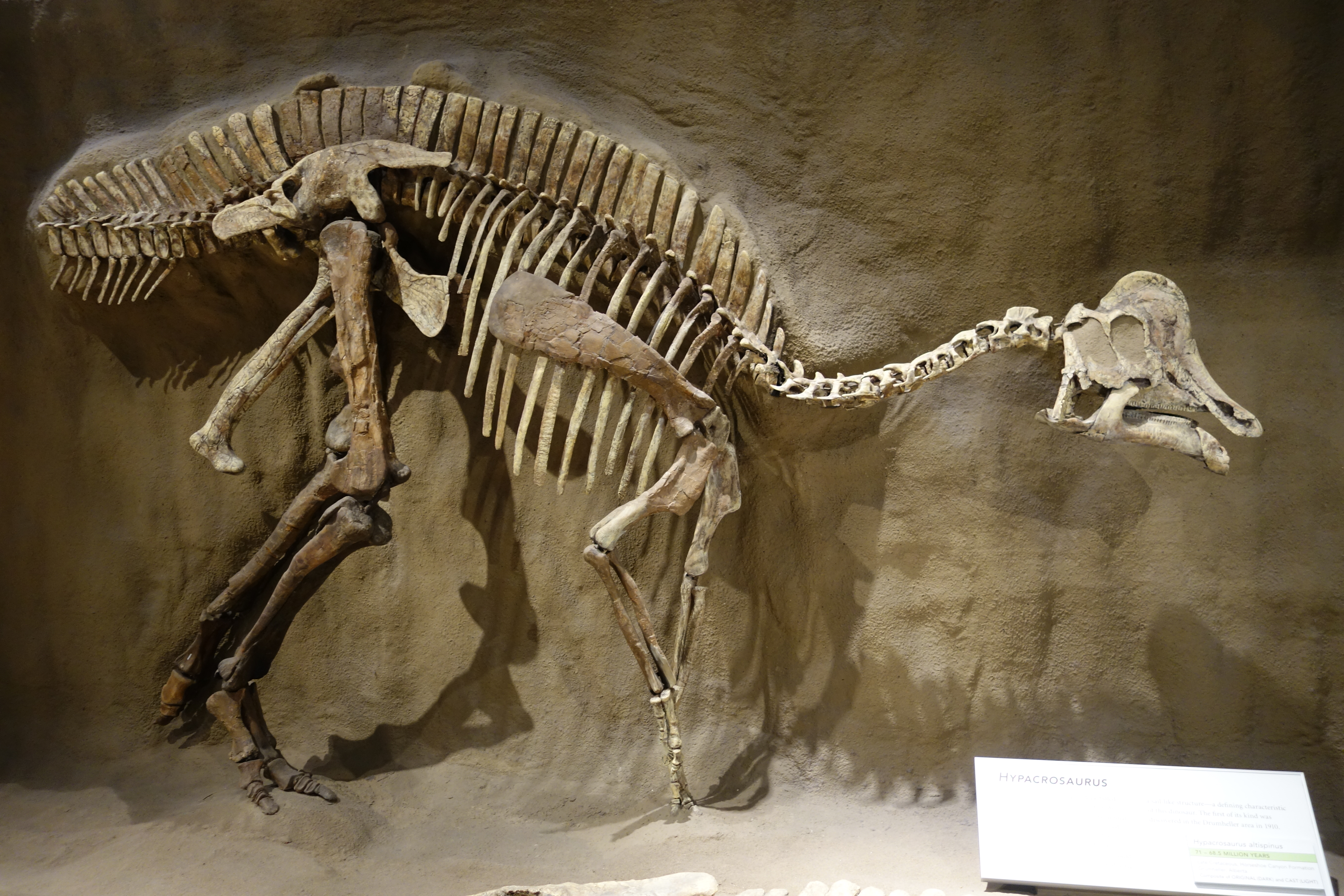
- H. altispinus fossil at the Royal Tyrrell Museum

Scientific classification
- Kingdom: Animalia
- Phylum: Chordata
- Class: Reptilia
- Clade: Dinosauria
- Clade: †Ornithischia
- Clade: †Ornithopoda
- Family: †Hadrosauridae
- Subfamily: †Lambeosaurinae
- Tribe: †Lambeosaurini
- Genus: †Hypacrosaurus; Brown, 1913

Type species
- †Hypacrosaurus altispinus Brown, 1913

Other species
- †H. stebingeri? Horner & Currie, 1994

Synonyms
- Cheneosaurus Lambe, 1917; Magnapaulia? Prieto-Márquez et al., 2012

= Hypacrosaurus =

Hypacrosaurus Temporal range: Late Cretaceous, ~75.0–69.5 Ma

Extinct genus of dinosaurs

Hypacrosaurus (meaning "near the highest lizard" [from Ancient Greek ὑπο- hypo- "less" and ἄκρος akros "high"], because it was almost but not quite as large as Tyrannosaurus) is an extinct genus of duckbill dinosaur similar in appearance to Corythosaurus. Like Corythosaurus, it had a tall, hollow rounded crest, although not as large and straight. It is known from the remains of two species that spanned 75.0 to 69.5 million years ago, in the Late Cretaceous of Alberta, Canada, and Montana, United States, and is the latest hollow-crested duckbill known from good remains in North America. It was an obscure genus until the discovery in 1987 of nests, eggs, and hatchlings belonging to H. stebingeri in the Bear Paw Formation.

== Discovery and history ==
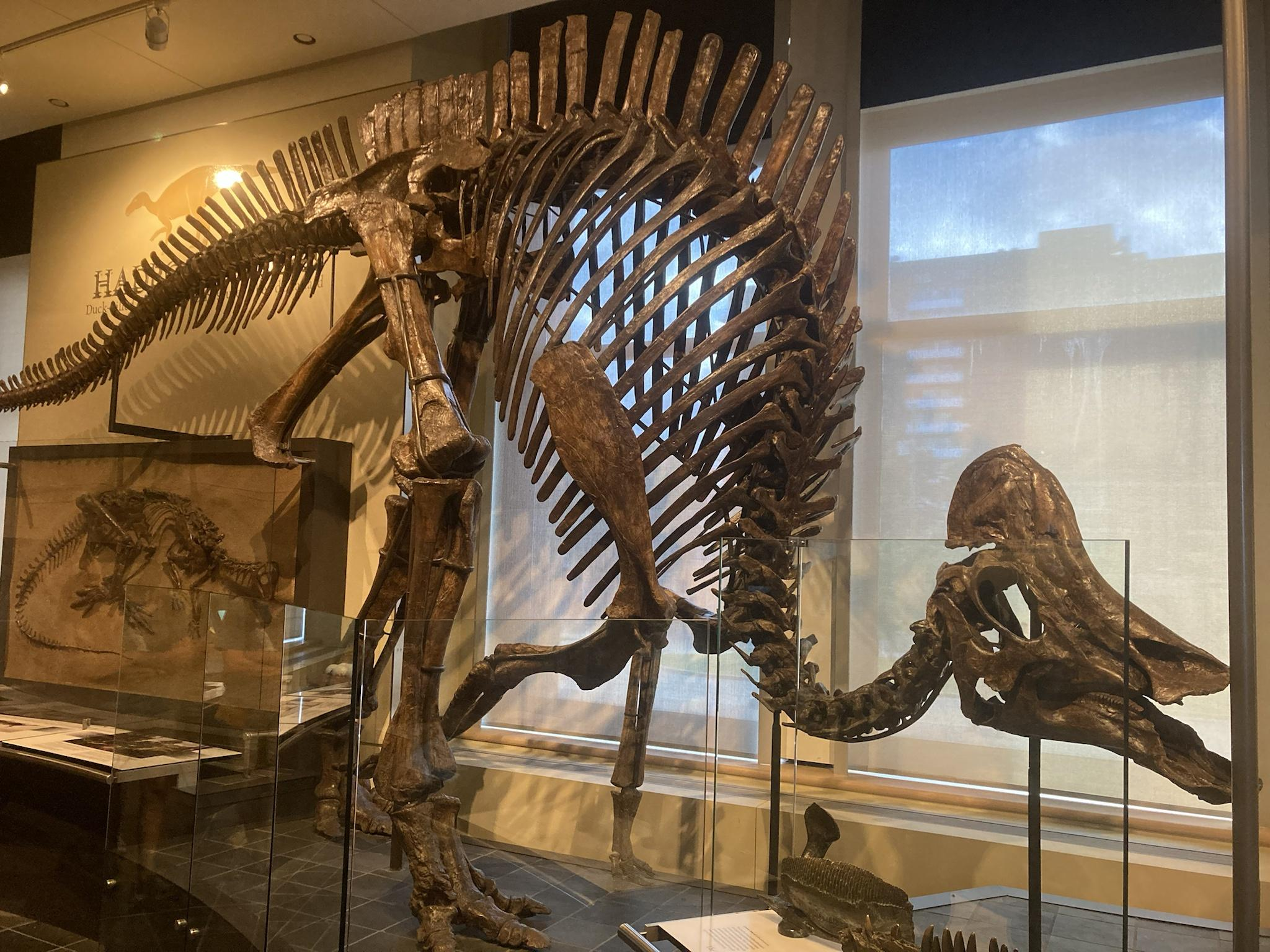
Skeletal mount of H. altispinus at Canadian Museum of Nature

The type remains of Hypacrosaurus were collected in 1910 by Barnum Brown for the American Museum of Natural History. The remains, a partial postcranial skeleton consisting of several vertebrae and a partial pelvis (AMNH 5204), came from along the Red Deer River near Tolman Ferry, Alberta, Canada, from rocks of what is now known as the Horseshoe Canyon Formation (early Maastrichtian, Upper Cretaceous). Brown described these remains, in combination with other postcranial bones, in 1913 as a new genus that he considered to be like Saurolophus. No skull was known at this time, but two skulls were soon discovered and described.

During this period, the remains of small hollow-crested duckbills were described as their own genera and species. The first of these that figure into the history of Hypacrosaurus was Cheneosaurus tolmanensis, based on a skull and assorted limb bones, vertebrae, and pelvic bones from the Horseshoe Canyon Formation. Not long after, Richard Swann Lull and Nelda Wright identified an American Museum of Natural History skeleton (AMNH 5461) from the Two Medicine Formation of Montana as a specimen of Procheneosaurus. These and other taxa were accepted as valid genera until the 1970s, when Peter Dodson showed that it was more likely that the "cheneosaurs" were the juveniles of other established lambeosaurines. Although he was mostly concerned with the earlier, Dinosaur Park Formation genera Corythosaurus and Lambeosaurus, he suggested that Cheneosaurus would turn out to be composed of juvenile individuals of the contemporaneous Hypacrosaurus altispinus. This idea has become accepted, although not formally tested. The Two Medicine Procheneosaurus, meanwhile, was not quite like the other Procheneosaurus specimens studied by Dodson, and for good reason: it was much more like a species that would not be named until 1994, H. stebingeri.

=== Species ===
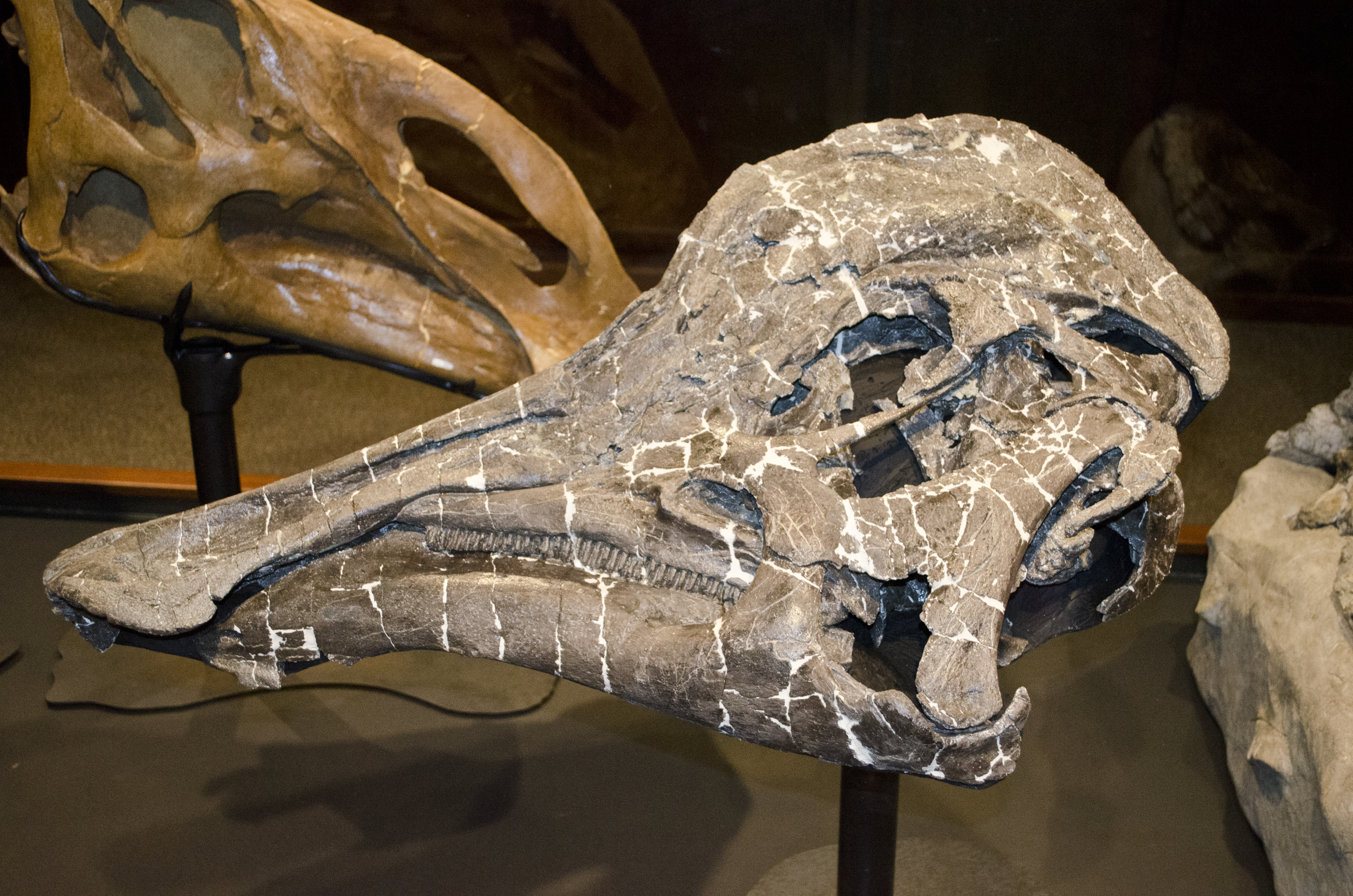
H. stebingeri holotype skull

H. altispinus, the type species, is known from 5 to 10 articulated skulls with some associated skeletal remains, from juvenile to adult individuals found in the Horseshoe Canyon Formation. H. stebingeri is known from an unknown but substantial number of individuals, with an age range of embryos to adults. The hypothesis that H. altispinus and H. stebingeri form a natural group excluding other known hadrosaur species may be incorrect, as noted in Suzuki et al.'s 2004 redescription of Nipponosaurus; their phylogenetic analysis found that Nipponosaurus was more closely related to H. altispinus than H. stebingeri was to H. altispinus. This was rejected by Evans and Reisz (2007), though.

The new species Hypacrosaurus stebingeri was named for a variety of remains, including hatchlings with associated eggs and nests, found near the top of the late Campanian (Upper Cretaceous) Two Medicine Formation in Glacier County, Montana, and across the border in Alberta. These represent "the largest collection of baby skeletal material of any single species of hadrosaur known". However, a 2026 study called past studies of H. stebingeri into question and that that species may be a wastebasket taxon, proposing it may be a species of Corythosaurus instead.

== Description ==
Size comparison between the two species and a human

Hypacrosaurus is most easily distinguished from other hollow-crested duckbills (lambeosaurines) by its tall neural spines and the form of its crest. The neural spines, which project from the top of the vertebrae, are 5 to 7 times the height of the body of their respective vertebrae in the back, which would have given it a tall back in profile. The skull's hollow crest is like that of Corythosaurus, but is more pointed along its top, not as tall, wider side to side, and has a small bony point at the rear. Unlike other lambeosaurines, the passages for the airways do not form an S-curve in the crest (at least not in H. altispinus). The animal is estimated to have been around 9.1 meters (30 feet) long, and to have weighed up to 4.0 tonnes (4.4 tons). As with most duckbills, its skeleton is otherwise not particularly remarkable, although some pelvic details are distinctive. Like other duckbills, it was a bipedal/quadrupedal herbivore. The two known species, H. altispinus and H. stebingeri, are not differentiated in the typical method, of unique characteristics, as H. stebingeri was described as transitional between the earlier Lambeosaurus and later Hypacrosaurus.

== Classification ==
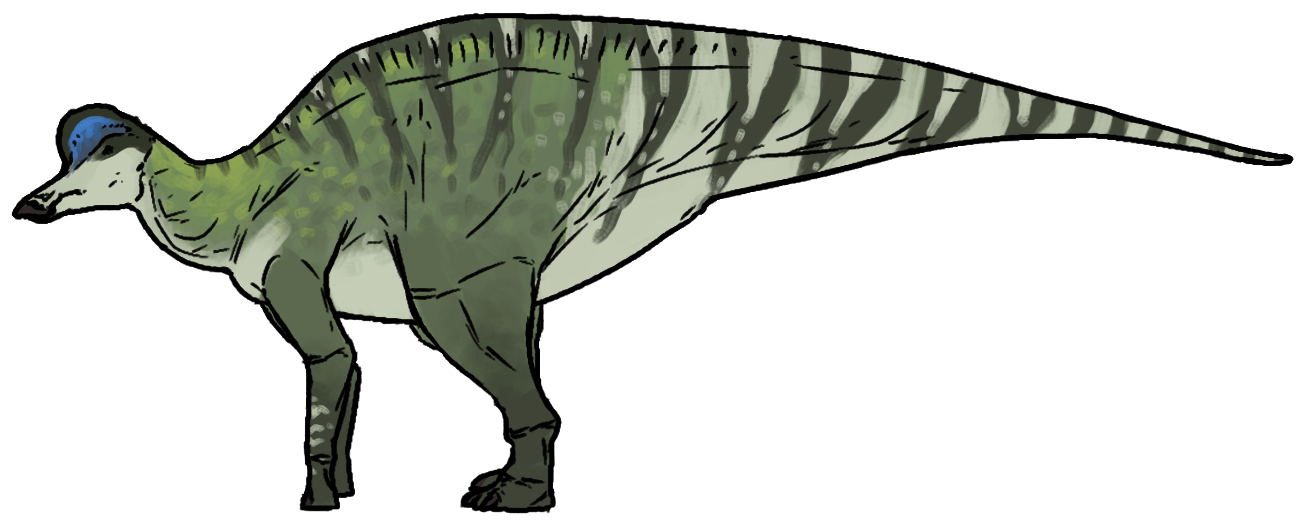
Life restoration of H. altispinus

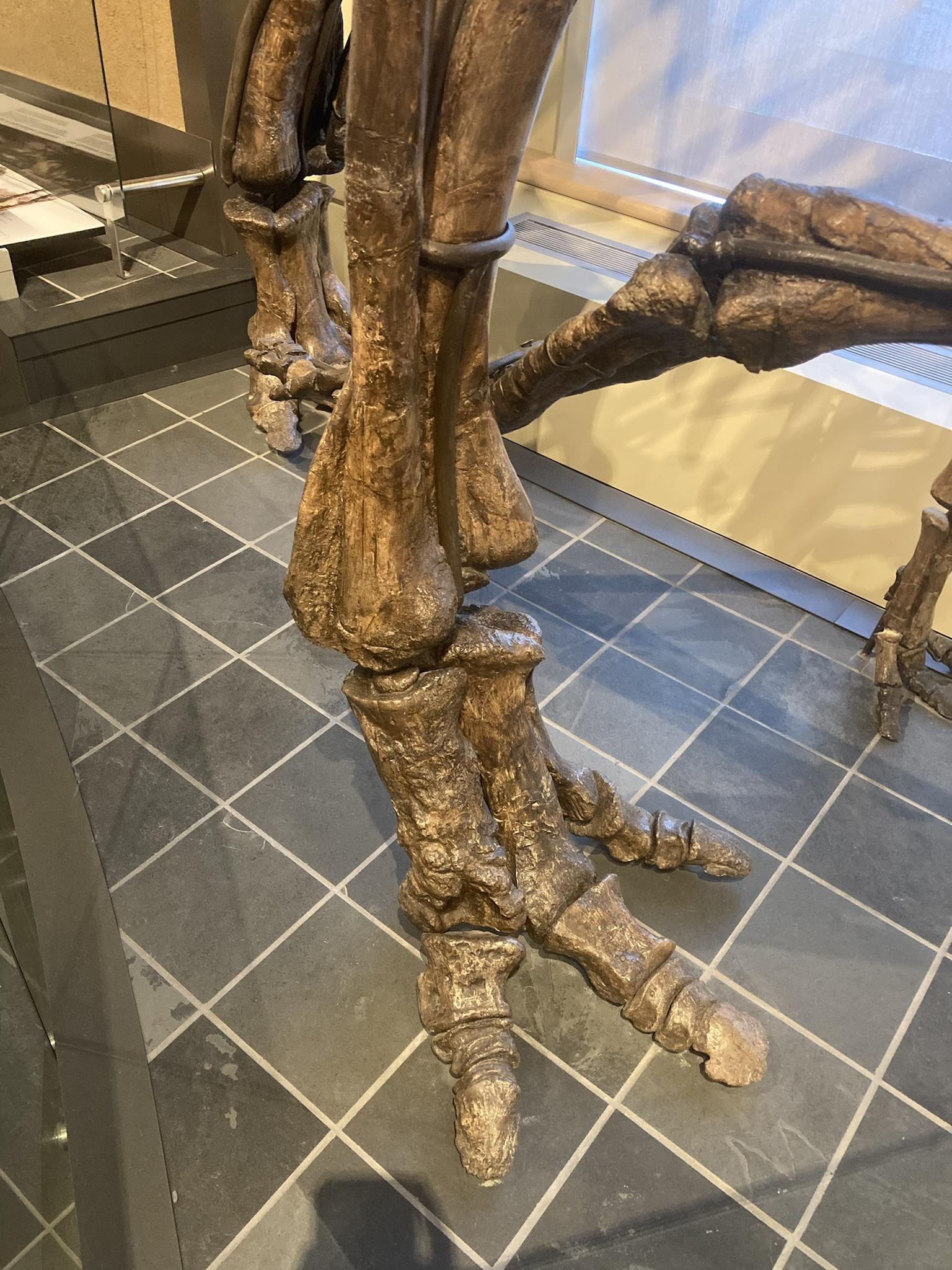
Hindfoot of H. altispinus

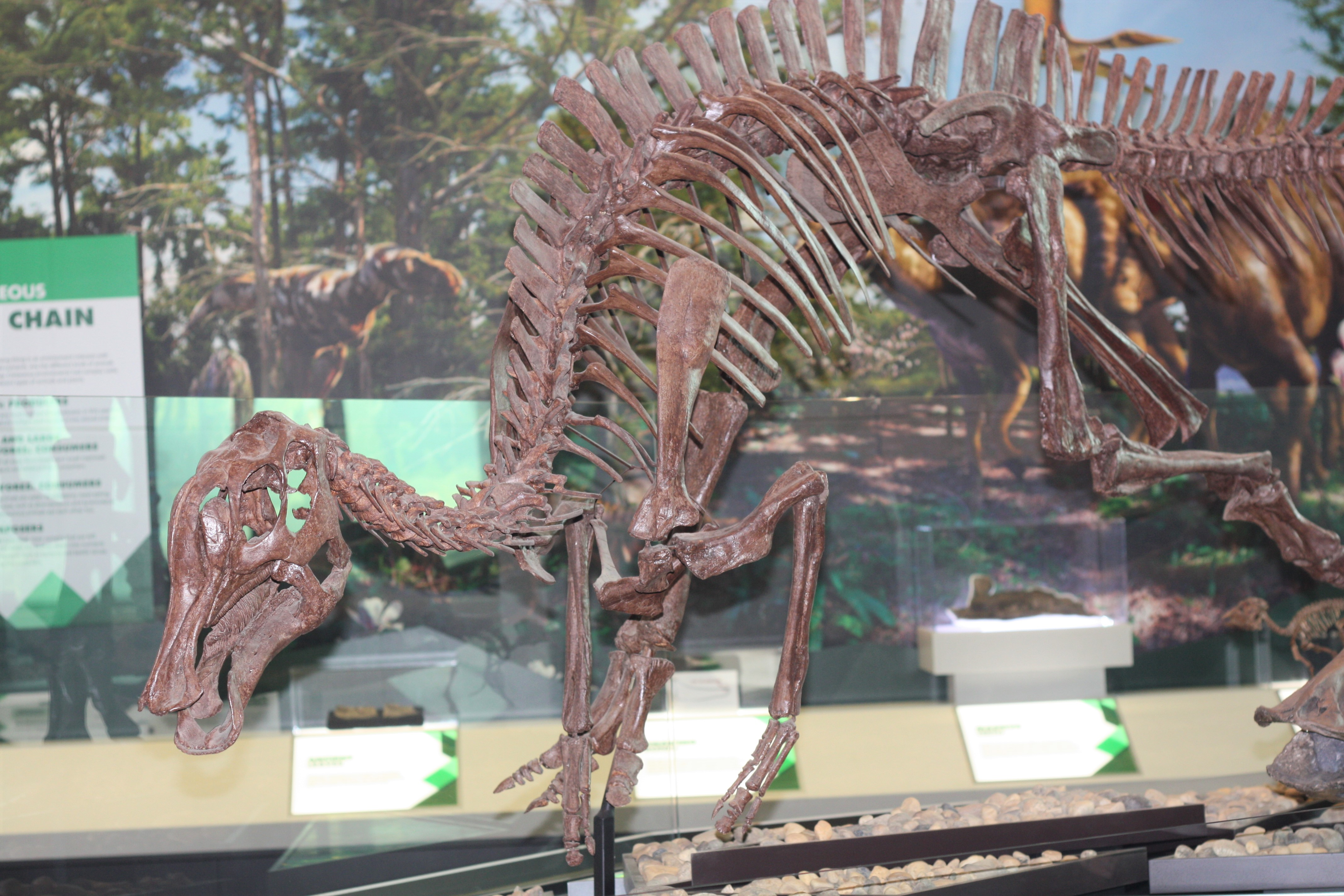
Hypacrosaurus mount at the Philip J. Currie Dinosaur Museum

Hypacrosaurus was a lambeosaurine hadrosaurid, and has been recognized as such since the description of its skull. Within the Lambeosaurinae, it is closest to Lambeosaurus and Corythosaurus, with Jack Horner and Phil Currie (1994) suggesting that H. stebingeri is transitional between Lambeosaurus and H. altispinus, and Michael K. Brett-Surman (1989) suggesting that Hypacrosaurus and Corythosaurus are the same genus. These genera, particularly Corythosaurus and Hypacrosaurus, are regarded as the "helmeted" or "hooded" branch of the lambeosaurines, and the clade they form is sometimes informally designated Lambeosaurini. Although Suzuki et al.'s 2004 redescription of Nipponosaurus found a close relationship between Nipponosaurus and Hypacrosaurus stebingeri, indicating that Hypacrosaurus may be paraphyletic, this was rejected in a later, more comprehensive reanalysis of lambeosaurines, which found the two species of Hypacrosaurus to form a clade without Nipponosaurus, with Corythosaurus and Olorotitan being the closest relatives.

The following cladogram illustrating the relationships of Lambeosaurus and its close relatives was recovered in a 2022 phylogenetic analysis by Xing Hai and colleagues. Unlike other modern analyses, they found the genus Magnapaulia to be within Hypacrosaurus, indicating it could be a potential third species.

- - Xuwulong
  - - Bactrosaurus
    - - Telmatosaurus
      - - - Gryposaurus
          - Edmontosaurus
        - Lambeosaurinae
          - Aralosaurini
            - Canardia
            - Aralosaurus
          - - Tsintaosaurini
              - Pararhabdodon
              - Tsintaosaurus
            - - Jaxartosaurus
              - - Arenysaurini
                  - Blasisaurus
                  - Arenysaurus
                - Corythosauria
                  - Parasaurolophus
                    - Parasaurolophus cyrtocristatus
                    - - "Charonosaurus" jiayinensis
                      - - Parasaurolophus tubicen
                        - Parasaurolophus walkeri
                  - Lambeosaurini
                    - Olorotitan
                    - - Velafrons
                      - - - Amurosaurus
                          - Lambeosaurus
                            - Lambeosaurus clavinitialis
                            - - Lambeosaurus magnicristatus
                              - Lambeosaurus lambei
                        - - Corythosaurus
                            - Corythosaurus intermedius
                            - Corythosaurus casuarius
                          - Hypacrosaurus
                            - Hypacrosaurus altispinus
                            - - "Magnapaulia" laticaudus
                              - Hypacrosaurus stebingeri

== Paleobiology ==
As a hadrosaurid, Hypacrosaurus would have been a bipedal/quadrupedal herbivore, eating a variety of plants. Its skull permitted a grinding motion analogous to chewing, and its teeth were continually replacing and packed into dental batteries that contained hundreds of teeth, only a relative handful of which were in use at any time. Plant material would have been cropped by its broad beak, and held in the jaws by a cheek-like organ. Its feeding range would have extended from the ground to about 4 m (13 ft) above.

=== Crest functions ===
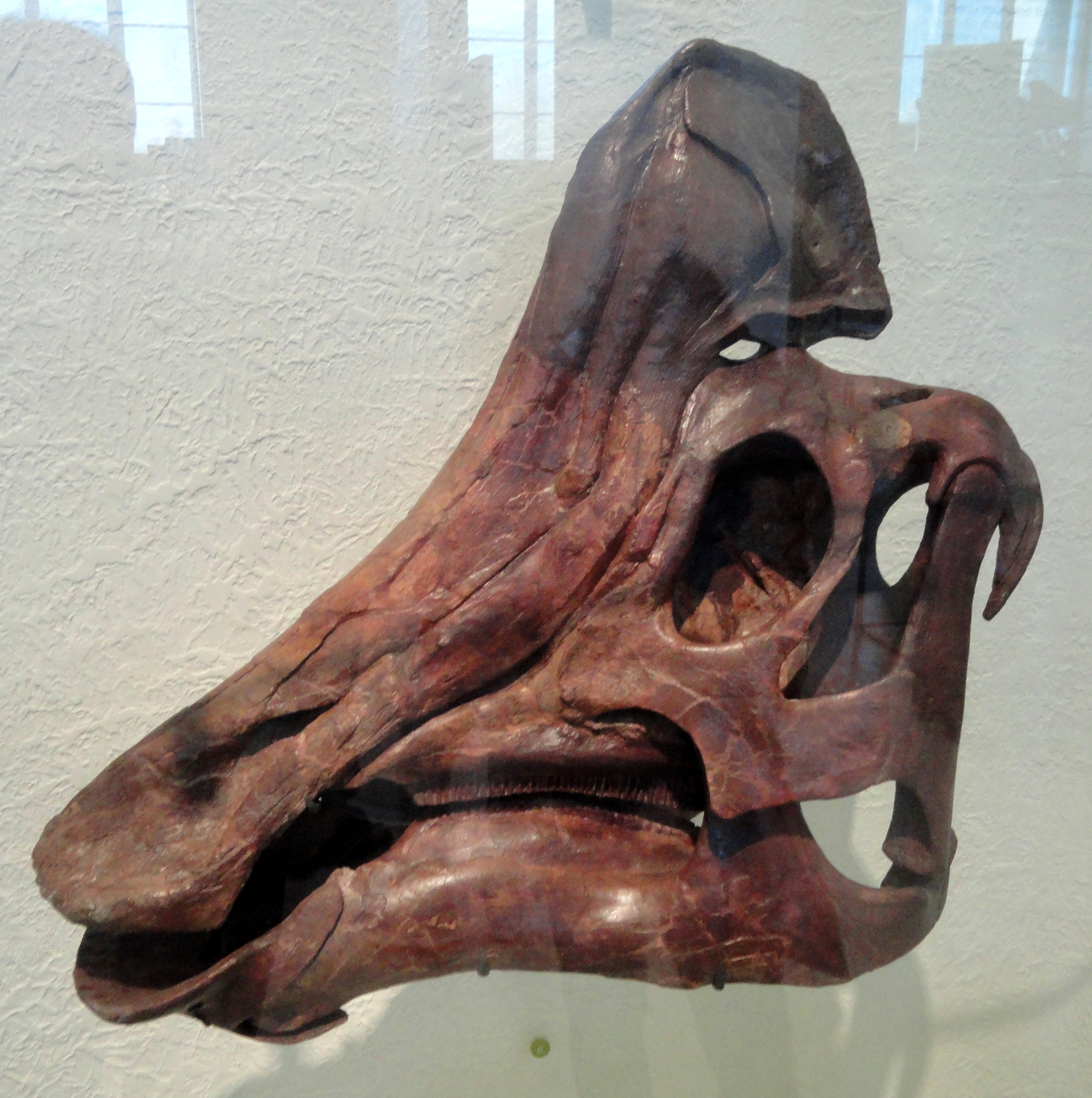
H. altispinus skull, AMNH

The hollow crest of Hypacrosaurus most likely had social functions, such as a visual signal allowing individuals to identify sex or species, and providing a resonating chamber for making noises. The crest and its associated nasal passages have also figured in the debate about dinosaur endothermy, specifically in discussions about nasal turbinates.

Turbinates are thin bones or cartilages that come in two types, with two functions. Nasal olfactory turbinates are found in all living tetrapods and function in smell. Respiratory turbinates function to prevent water loss through evaporation and are found only in birds and mammals, modern endotherms (warm-blooded animals) who could lose a great deal of water while breathing because they breathe more often than comparably sized ectotherms (cold-blooded animals) to support their higher metabolism. Ruben and others in 1996 concluded that respiratory turbinates were probably not present in Nanotyrannus, Ornithomimus or Hypacrosaurus based on CT scanning, thus there was no evidence that those animals were warm-blooded.

=== Thermoregulation ===
Examining the oxygen-isotope ratio from the bones from different parts of an extinct animal's body should indicate which thermoregulation mode an animal used during its lifetime. An endothermic (warm-blooded) animal should maintain a very similar body temperature throughout its entire body (which is called homeothermy) and therefore there should be little variation in the oxygen-isotope ratio when measured in different bones. Alternatively, the oxygen-isotope ratio differs considerably when measured throughout the body of an organism with an ectothermic (cold-blooded) physiology. Oxygen-isotope ratios calculated for Hypacrosaurus suggesting that the ratios varied little, indicating that Hypacrosaurus was a homeotherm, and likely was endothermic. This is in contrast to the Ruben et al. (1996) finding that Hypacrosaurus was not warm-blooded, which was based on the absence of nasal turbinates (see Crest functions subsection, above).

=== Nests and growth ===
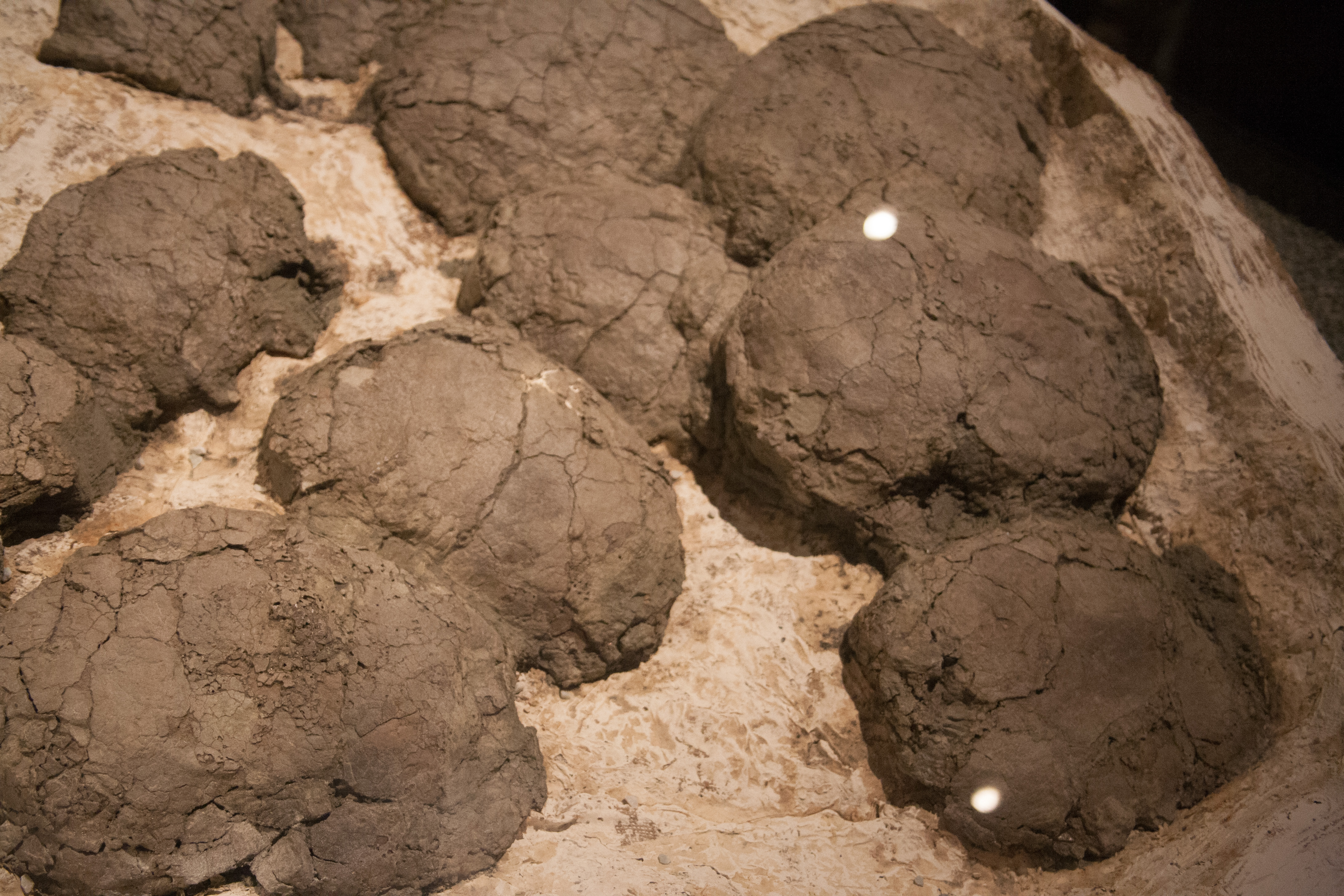
H. stebingeri nest

Hypacrosaurus stebingeri laid roughly spherical eggs of 24 by 18.5 cm (9.4 by 7.3 in), with embryos 60 cm (24 in) long. Hatchlings were around 1.7 m (5.6 ft) long. Studies of lines of growth (i.e. lines of von Ebner) in the teeth of embryonic H. stebingeri suggests plesiomorphically long incubation times, with a minimum incubation time of 171.4 days for H. stebingeri. Comparisons to the related Maiasaura suggest that infant Hypacrosaurus were more precocial than the former, which took 40-75 days to leave the nest. Young and embryonic individuals had deep skulls with only slight expansion in the bones that would one day form the crest. Growth was faster than that of an alligator and comparable to ratite growth, for several years, based on the amount of bone growth seen between lines of arrested growth (analogous to growth rings in trees). Research by Lisa Cooper and colleagues on H. stebingeri indicates that this animal may have reached reproductive maturity at the age of 2 to 3 years, and reached full size at about 10 to 12 years old. The circumference of the thigh bone at postulated reproductive maturity was about 40% that of its circumference at full size. The postulated growth rate of H. stebingeri outpaces those of tyrannosaurids (predators of hypacrosaurs) such as Albertosaurus and Tyrannosaurus; rapidly growing hypacrosaurs would have had a better chance to reach a size large enough to be of defensive value, and beginning reproduction at an early age would also have been advantageous to a prey animal. Secondary cartilage has been found in the skull of a hatchling specimen of H. stebingeri.

=== Cells ===
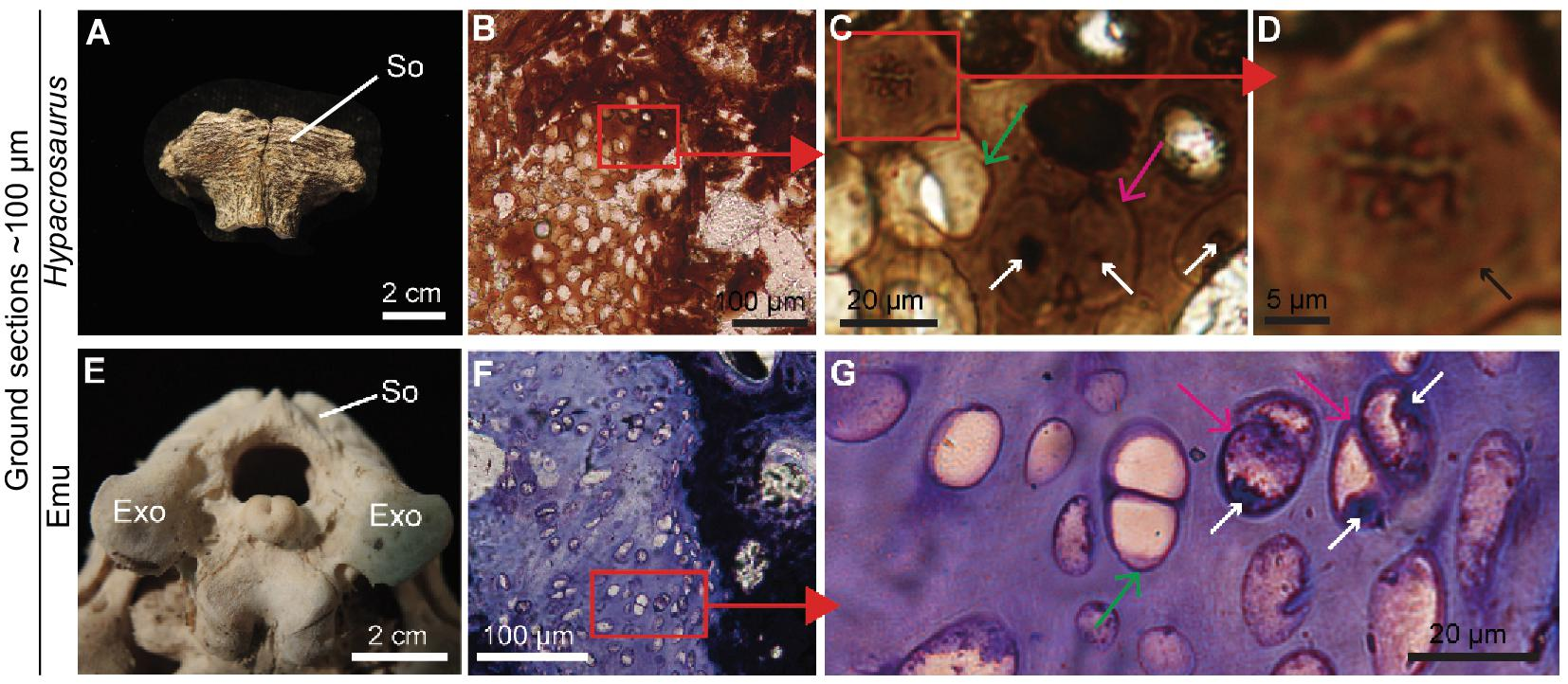
Hypacrosaurus MOR 548 supraoccipital with microscopic magnification showing the preserved chondrocyte-like structures, in comparison to those of an emu

In 2020, Alida M. Bailleul and colleagues reported cartilage traces on a hatchling specimen of H. stebingeri. The team performed histological analyses on skull and limb bones of nestling individuals of the specimen MOR 548, a large nesting ground in the Two Medicine Formation attributed to H. stebingeri, and the results showed calcified cartilage within a supraoccipital bone, and upon microscopic magnification, chondrocyte-like structures were found. Several of these structures were preserved in the final stages of mitosis, with some preserving putative traces of celular nuclei. Bailleul and colleagues isolated some of these cells in order to be tested with DNA staining: stains DAPI and PI. They also exposed emu chondrocytes, and these tied up to DNA fragments. H. stebingeri cells tested positive to possible chemical markers of DNA, in a similar way to the emu cells, suggesting the potential preservation of this molecule. The team concluded that the find was not a product of fossil contamination, and DNA may last much longer than previously assumed.

=== Paleopathology ===
The discovery of tooth marks in the fibula of a Hypacrosaurus specimen inflicted by a bite from the teeth of a tyrannosaurid indicated that this, and other hadrosaurids were either preyed upon or scavenged by large theropod dinosaurs during the Late Cretaceous period.

== Paleoecology ==
=== Taphonomy ===
The large, monospecific assemblage of Hypacrosaurus stebingeri in Montana was interpreted as a group of dinosaurs that was killed by a volcanic ashfall. This assemblage is considered autochthonous, meaning that the remains are thought to have been buried on or near the same spot where the individuals died. The variety of ages in this group supports that this was a biocoenosis—an actual life assemblage of animals. The cause of death in a volcanic ashfall is suffocation by the ash and by the gases released from volcanic eruptions. The preservation of this diverse group of dinosaurs provides researchers with a growth series, which is a sequence of growth stages from juvenile to adult.

=== Environment ===
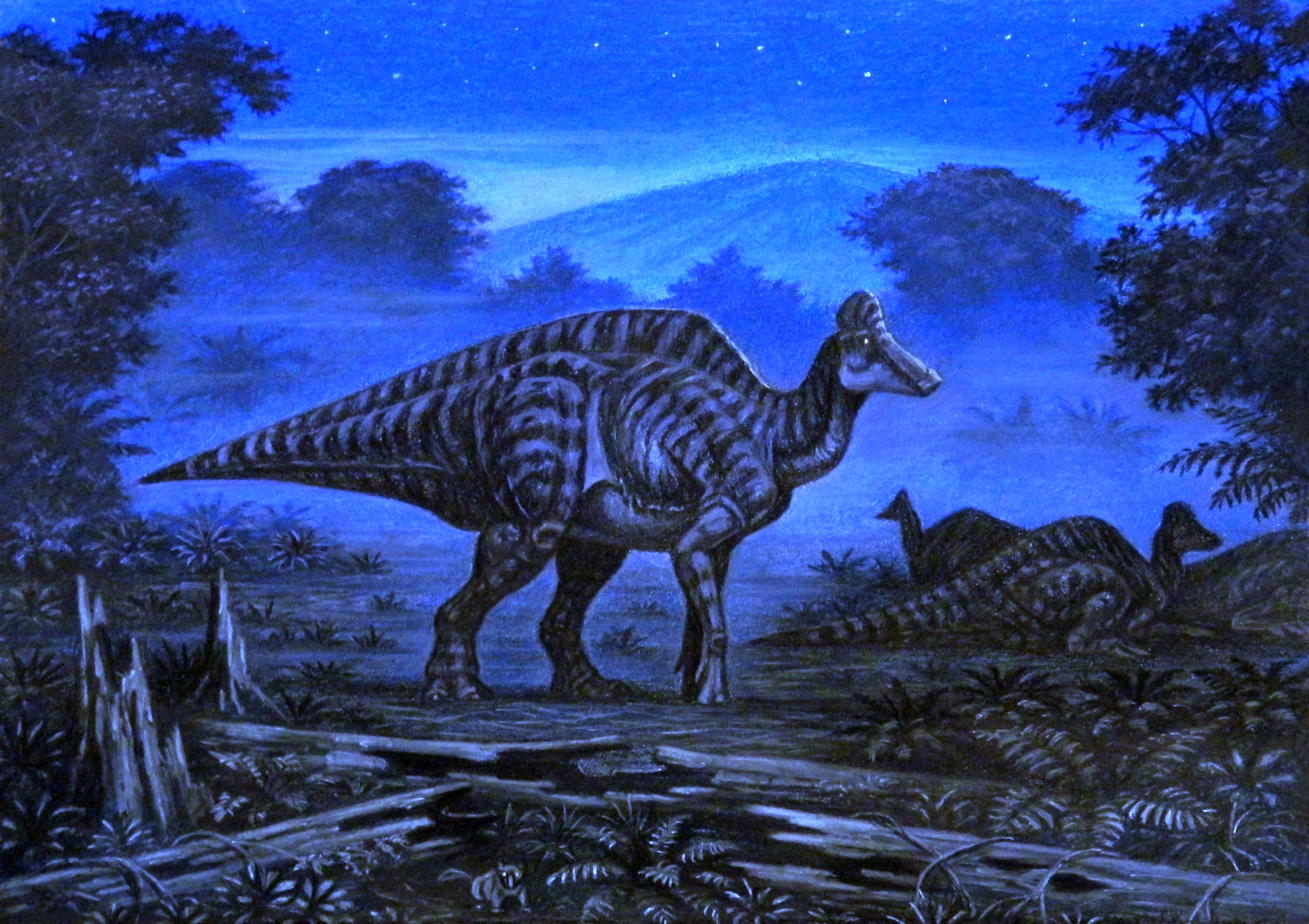
Restoration of H. altispinus in environment

H. altispinus shared the Horseshoe Canyon Formation with fellow hadrosaurids Edmontosaurus and Saurolophus, hypsilophodont Parksosaurus, ankylosaurid Anodontosaurus, nodosaurid Edmontonia, horned dinosaurs Montanoceratops, Anchiceratops, Arrhinoceratops, and Pachyrhinosaurus, pachycephalosaurid Stegoceras, ostrich-mimics Ornithomimus and Struthiomimus, a variety of poorly known small theropods including troodontids and dromaeosaurids, and the tyrannosaurid Albertosaurus. The dinosaurs from this formation are sometimes known as Edmontonian, after a land mammal age, and are distinct from those in the formations above and below. The Horseshoe Canyon Formation is interpreted as having a significant marine influence, due to an encroaching Western Interior Seaway, the shallow sea that covered the midsection of North America through much of the Cretaceous. H. altispinus may have preferred to stay more landward.

The slightly older Two Medicine Formation, home to H. stebingeri, was also populated by another well-known nesting hadrosaur, Maiasaura, as well as the troodontid Troodon, which is also known from nesting traces. The tyrannosaurid Daspletosaurus, caenagnathid Chirostenotes, dromaeosaurids Bambiraptor and Saurornitholestes, armored dinosaurs Edmontonia, Oohkotokia, and Scolosaurus, hypsilophodont Orodromeus, hadrosaur Prosaurolophus, and horned dinosaurs Achelousaurus, Brachyceratops, Einiosaurus, and Rubeosaurus were also present. This formation was more distant from the Western Interior Seaway, higher and drier, with a more terrestrial influence.

== See also ==
- Timeline of hadrosaur research
