= Corral de Enmedio Formation =

Geologic formation in Mexico

- Stratigraphic range: Mesozoic
- Type: Geological formation
- Unit of: Cabollona Group

Location
- Country: Mexico

The Corral de Enmedio Formation is a Mesozoic geologic formation in Mexico. The formation may be from the Kirtlandian land vertebrate age. It has a similar fauna to the Packard Formation.

== Paleofauna ==
The fragmentary remains of indeterminate lepisosteids, trionychids, eusuchians, hadrosaurids, and ceratopsids are known from the Corral de Enmedio Formation.

Color key: Taxon / Reclassified taxon / Taxon falsely reported as present / Dubious taxon or junior synonym / Ichnotaxon / Ootaxon / Morphotaxon	Notes; Uncertain or tentative taxa are in small text; ~~crossed out~~ taxa are discredited.

Vertebrates of the Corral de Enmedio Formation
Genus	Species	Location	Stratigraphic position	Abundance	Notes
Albertosaurus	Indeterminate				
Chamops	C. segnis				
Melvius	Indeterminate				
Trachodon	T. mirabilis				Later found to be indeterminate hadrosaurid remains.

== See also ==
- List of dinosaur-bearing rock formations
  - List of stratigraphic units with few dinosaur genera
