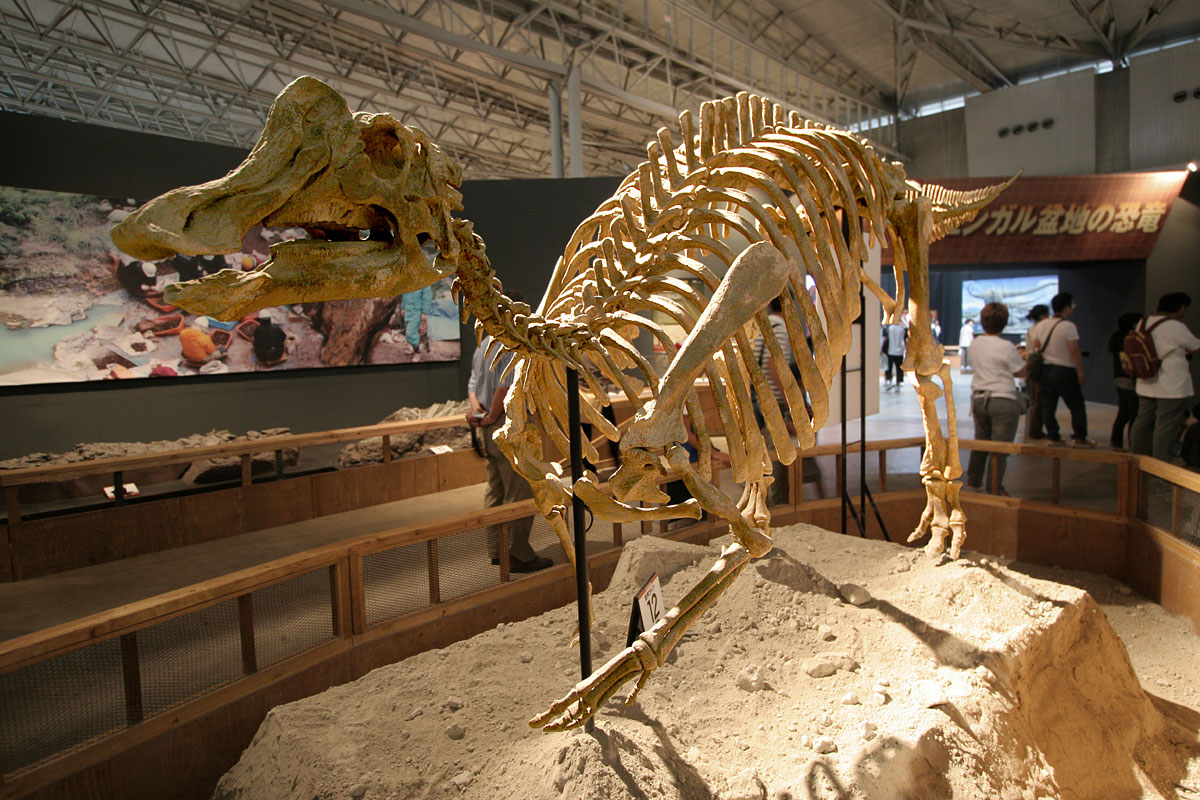
- Restored skeleton

Scientific classification
- Kingdom: Animalia
- Phylum: Chordata
- Class: Reptilia
- Clade: Dinosauria
- Clade: †Ornithischia
- Clade: †Ornithopoda
- Family: †Hadrosauridae
- Subfamily: †Lambeosaurinae
- Genus: †Nipponosaurus; Nagao, 1936

Type species
- †Nipponosaurus sachalinensis Nagao, 1936

= Nipponosaurus =

Nipponosaurus Temporal range: Upper Santonian - Lower Campanian ~80 Ma

Hadrosaurid dinosaur genus from Late Cretaceous Asia

Nipponosaurus (meaning "Japanese lizard") is a lambeosaurine hadrosaur from sediments of the Yezo Group, in Sinegorsk on the island of Sakhalin, which was part of Japan at the time of the species' classification. The type and only species is N. sachalinensis, known only from a single juvenile specimen discovered in 1934 and named in 1936, by Takumi Nagao, with further material of the same individual found in 1937. Since then, the taxon has been largely ignored, and its validity has been doubted, with synonymy with other Asian hadrosaurs or status as a nomen dubium being suggested. Redescriptions from 2004 and 2017, however, have supported recognition as a distinct species. Dating the only specimen has been difficult, but based on associated mollusc taxa, the species likely lived sometime in the upper Santonian or lower Campanian, around 80 million years ago.

== History of study ==
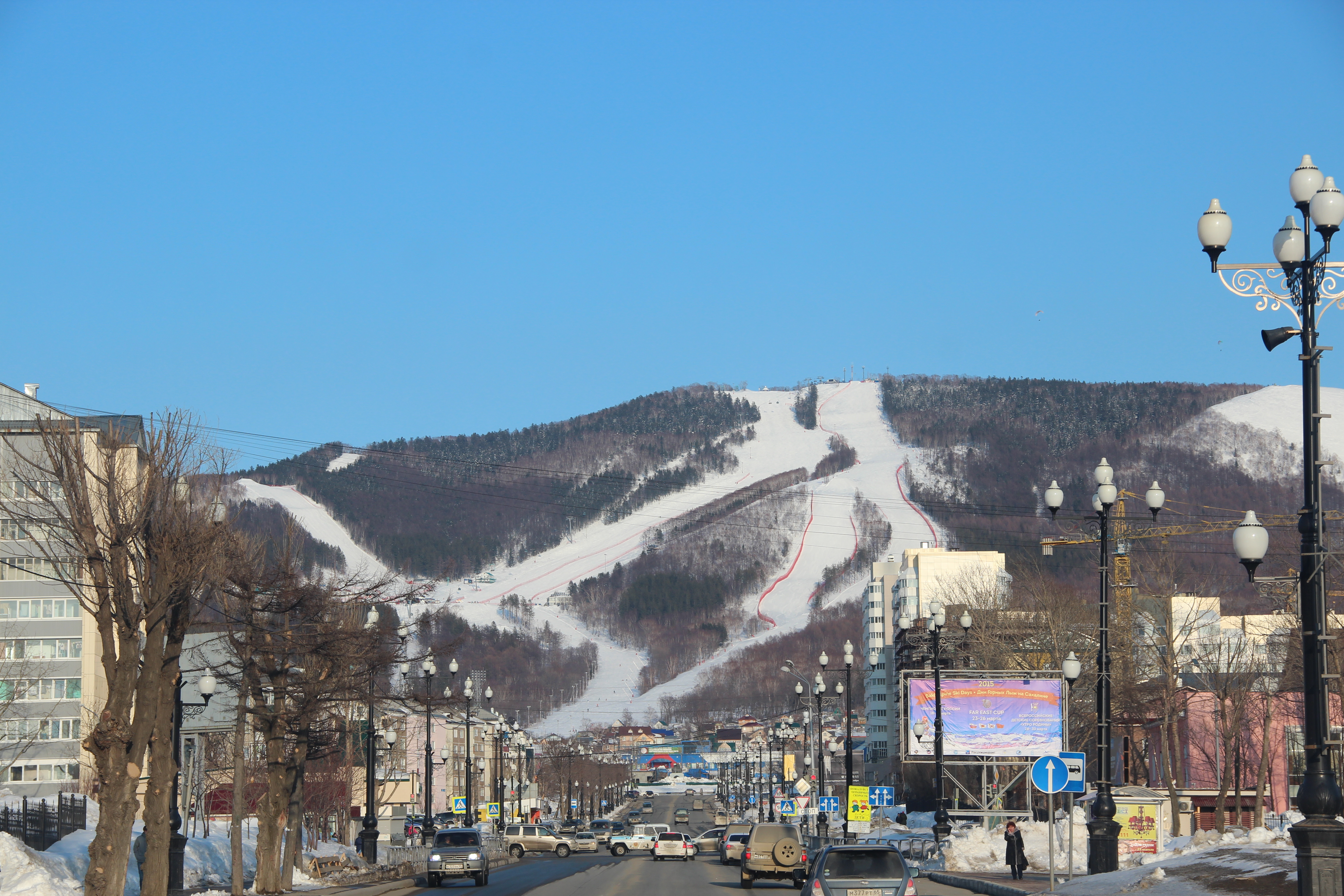
Central Yuzhno-Sakhalinsk, the capital of Sakhalin Island. The holotype specimen was found 28km northwest of the city

The holotype (UHR 6590, University of Hokkaidō Registration) was discovered in November 1934 during the construction of a hospital for the Kawakami colliery of the Mitsui Mining Company on Karafuto Prefecture (now Sinegorsk, Sakhalin, Russia). It was disarticulated when discovered. N. sachalinensis was named and described in 1936 by Professor Takumi Nagao of the Imperial University of Hokkaido. The generic name refers to Nippon, the Japanese name of Japan; it was the first dinosaur named based on a find made on Japanese territory – though South Sakhalin was annexed by the Soviet Union in 1945. The specific name refers to Sakhalin.

Although being relatively complete at the time of discovery, the specimen was missing much of the skull and limbs. A second expedition was organised in the summer of 1937, in which limb material pertaining to the holotype was recovered. The next year, Nagao authored a second article on the species describing these additional remains.

Nipponosaurus was described as a member of the Trachodontidae; however Trachodon is now considered an invalid nomen dubium. The family is now known as the Hadrosauridae. Among its relatives, Nagao thought it was possibly closest to the taxa Cheneosaurus and Tetragonosaurus, even suggesting that his species might later prove to be congeneric with one of them. However, these were later determined to be juvenile forms of Hypacrosaurus, Corythosaurus and Lambeosaurus, and not distinct species.

For the remainder of the 20th century, the taxon was scarcely mentioned. While they were still considered valid species, the relationship with the supposed "cheneosaurs" Cheneosaurus and Procheneosaurus was accepted; after this it was rarely assigned past the Lambeosaurinae. A humerus from a pit near Hashima Island, Japan was assigned to Nipponosaurus, variously referred to as Trachodon, in 1967. No further studies have acknowledged the specimen, and the referral has been ignored, with the species still considered to be represented by a single specimen. In 1977, a review of Asian dinosaur palaeontology mentioned it as a possible close relative of Mandschurosaurus without comment. Later in 1989, a study noted that features of its metacarpals could indicate a basal position within the Hadrosauridae. Near the turn of the century, in 1994, a review of Japanese dinosaurs noted the incomplete nature of many Asian hadrosaurs could mean some of them, including Nipponosaurus, may in fact be representatives of the same species.

More extensive research has been conducted in the 21st century. In 2004, the species was redescribed, with focus on its growth stage. They concluded it was a valid taxon, and that the holotype was immature. More recently, a 2017 study provided further descriptions of the specimen, and conducted a microscopic examination on sections of the left femur, a rib, and an isolated chevron, which re-affirmed the age of the holotype.

== Description ==
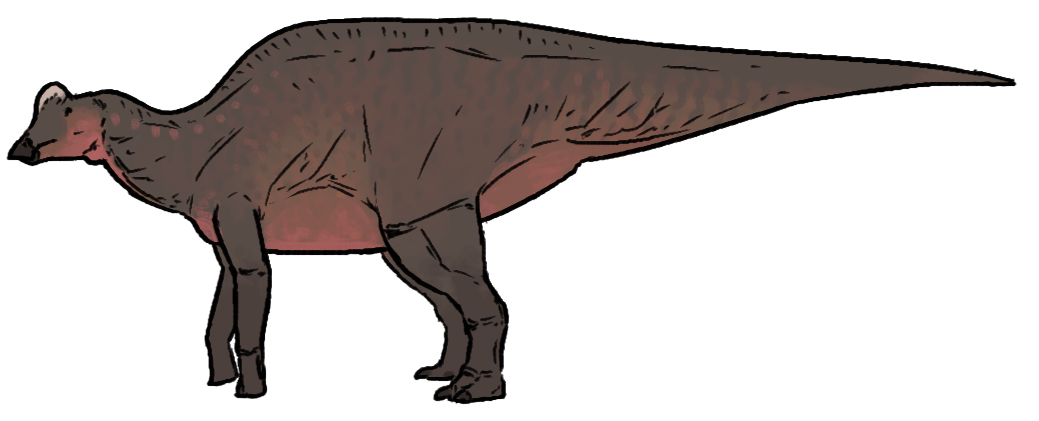
Life restoration

The immature holotype specimen measures roughly 4 metres (13 feet) in length. When it was originally described, it was considered to be an adult, because of its co-ossified sacral vertebra. Future authors doubted this, merely citing its small size. In the 2004 redescription, it was examined more closely and several characteristics were found that identified it as an juvenile individual. Later, in 2017, another team re-evaluated the specimen, and determined through investigating the fossils at a microscopic level (in a process called histology) that this was correct, although they doubted the significance of some of the characters identified in the former study.

Though the quality of bone preservation is generally poor, the holotype skeleton is estimated to be 60% complete. It consists of a left maxilla and dentary, parietal, various isolated skull elements, thirteen cervical vertebrae, six dorsal vertebrae, two sacral vertebrae, a series of 35 caudal vertebrae, a left scapula, lower portions of both humeri, most elements of the lower forelimbs, an ischium, left ilium, and most of the hindlimbs.

== Classification ==
Some authors have deemed the species a nomen dubium, questioning its supposed diagnostic characteristics, especially in light of its presumed immature status. The validity of the taxon has therefore been controversial. The 2004 redescription denied this, proposing three diagnostic characters. In their description of Sahaliyania and Wulagasaurus, Pascal Godefroit and colleagues reported based on direct observation of the type specimen that all of these supposed unique traits were found in other hadrosaurids. The lack of certain portions of the skull key to evaluating its systematic position was also cited as a reason to doubt the validity of the genus, and the problematic nature of the skull had indeed been noted before. Later, a 2017 study once again questioned the validity of the proposed diagnostic characters; however, upon a re-examination of the specimen, three new ones were put forward.

A cladistic analysis in 2004 placed Nipponosaurus sachalinensis very close to the well-known North American Hypacrosaurus altispinus within the Lambeosaurinae. They suggested it might be congeneric with the species, but because of the incomplete nature of the holotype and the questionable monophyly of the genus Hypacrosaurus, they refrained from reassigning it. However, later in 2007, a study providing a redescription of Lambeosaurus magnicristatus re-evaluated a character relating to the size of the distal ischial foot, and found this drew Nipponosaurus away from H. altispinus and into a more basal position within their Corythosaurini (now generally referred to as the Lambeosaurini). They however noted the only character uniting it specifically with this group, an increased number of cervical vertebrae, was a state poorly known in more basal Asian lambeosaurines, and cautioned its position was likely liable to change. The left cladogram was recovered in the 2004 study, and the right cladogram was recovered by the 2007 study:

- - Parasaurolophus
  - Lambeosaurini
    - - Hypacrosaurus? stebingeri
      - - Nipponosaurus
        - Hypacrosaurus altispinus
    - - Corythosaurus
      - Lambeosaurus

- - Parasaurolophini
  - Lambeosaurini
    - Nipponosaurus
    - - Lambeosaurus
      - - Olorotitan
        - Corythosaurus
        - Hypacrosaurus
          - Hypacrosaurus stebingeri
          - Hypacrosaurus altispinus

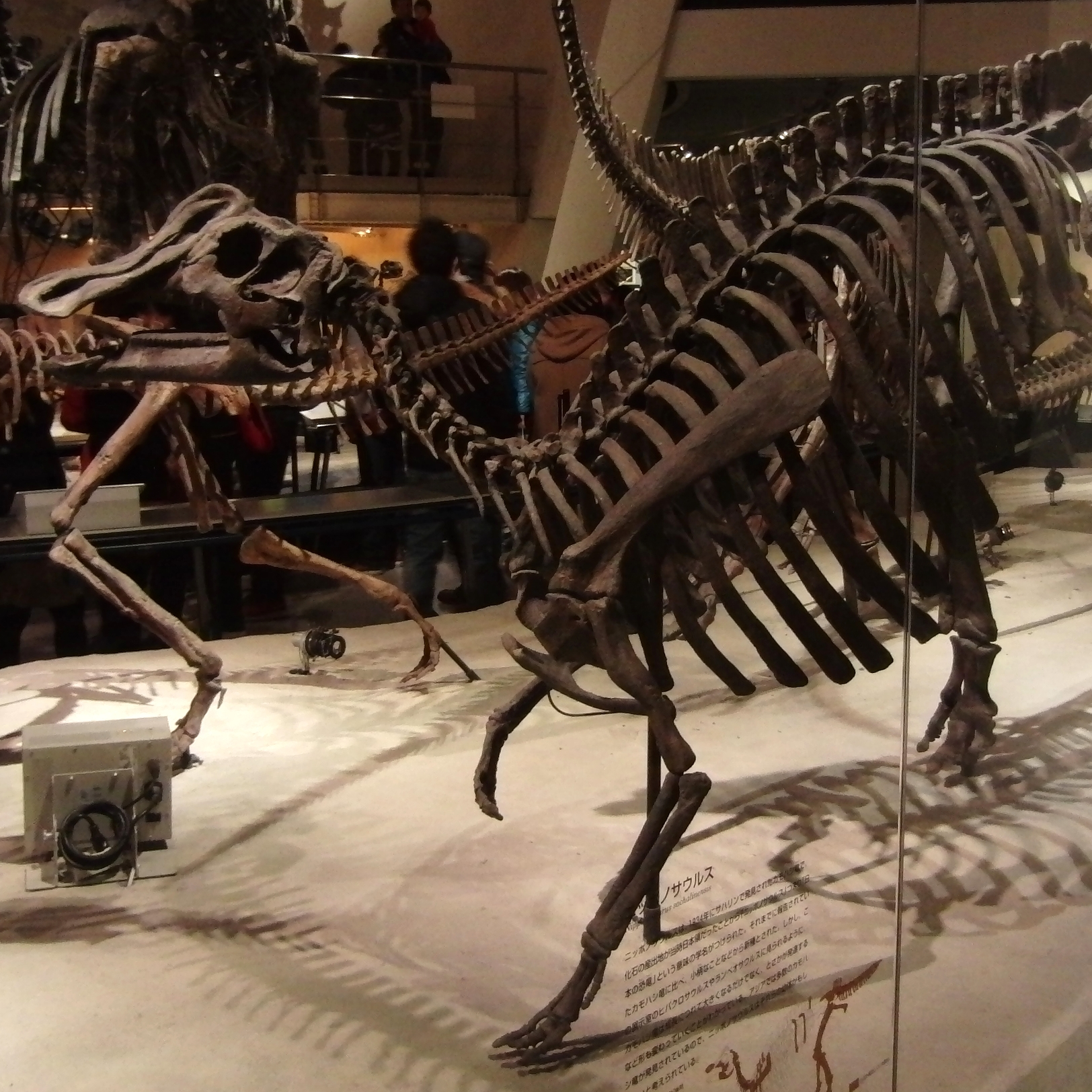
Mount exhibited in Tokyo, Japan at the National Museum of Nature and Science

More recently, another analysis, accounting for characters that vary through ontogeny, instead found it to be closely related to the European taxa Arenysaurus and Blasisaurus, outside of Lambeosaurini, unlike the earlier studies. Its position outside of the clade containing Parasaurolophini and Lambeosaurini was supported by the absence of two synapomorphies of the group in its teeth. Four characters united it with Arenysaurus and Blasisaurus; the end margin of the coronoid process overlapping with the back portion of the dental battery (which was suggested to perhaps reflect a difference in feeding habits from other taxa), a short edentulous slope, and two characters of the jugal. The following cladogram was recovered in their analysis:

- Hadrosauridae
  - Saurolophinae
  - Lambeosaurinae
    - Aralosaurus
    - - Canardia
      - - - Tsintaosaurus
          - Pararhabdodon
        - - Jaxartosaurus
          - - - Arenysaurus
              - Blasisaurus
              - Nipponosaurus
            - - Parasaurolophini
              - Lambeosaurini

== Palaeoecology ==
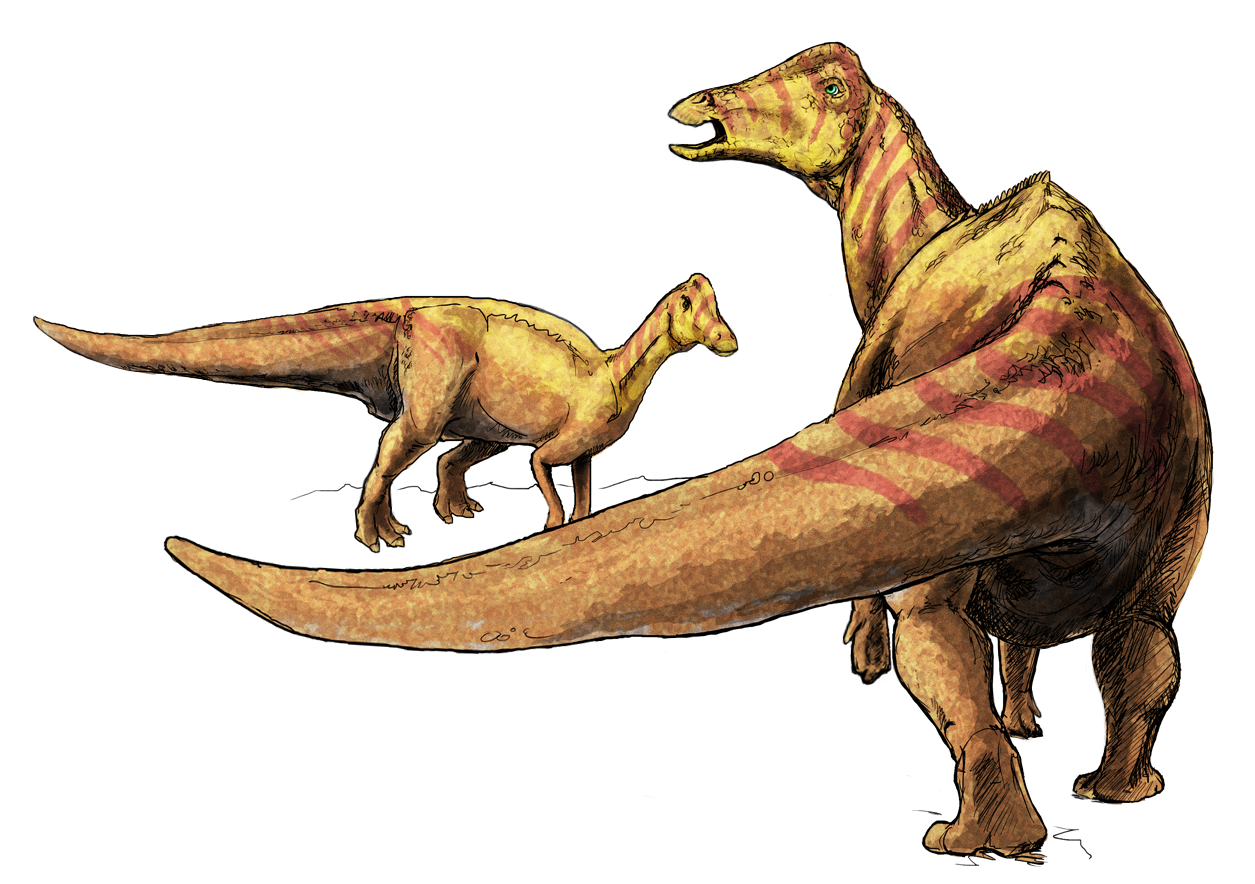
Restoration of a pair

The specimen was collected from Upper Yezo Group, which was known as the Upper Ammonites Bed at the time of the original description. Because the area where it was discovered no longer belongs to Japan, follow up research has become difficult. Additionally, field notes from the time of discovery have been lost. This has made determining the age of the horizon problematic. However, Nagao noted fossil molluscs now called Parapuzosia japonica and Sphenoceramus schmidti were also found at the locality, and these are known to hail from the lower Campanian. An age from the upper Santonian or lower Campanian is therefore likely.

Based on the sediments it was preserved in, the Nipponosaurus specimen is thought to have been buried in a marine setting. However, this would not have been far from the shore, as indicated by the relatively complete nature of the specimen and the presence of fossilised terrestrial plants found alongside it. This indicates the species may have lived primarily on low-lying plains near the coast, a lifestyle consistent with some of its North American relatives.

== See also ==
- Timeline of hadrosaur research
