= Packard Formation =

Geological formation in Mexico

- Stratigraphic range: Mesozoic
- Type: Geological formation
- Unit of: Cabullona Group

Location
- Country: Mexico

The Packard Formation is a Mesozoic geologic formation. The formation may be from the Kirtlandian land vertebrate age. It has a similar fauna to the Corral de Enmedio Formation.

== Paleofauna ==
The fragmentary remains of indeterminate lepisosteids, trionychids, eusuchians, hadrosaurids, and ceratopsids are known from the Packard Formation.

Color key: Taxon / Reclassified taxon / Taxon falsely reported as present / Dubious taxon or junior synonym / Ichnotaxon / Ootaxon / Morphotaxon	Notes; Uncertain or tentative taxa are in small text; ~~crossed out~~ taxa are discredited.

Vertebrates of the Packard Formation
Genus	Species	Location	Stratigraphic position	Abundance	Notes	Images
Albertosaurus	Indeterminate					Albertosaurus
Chamops	C. segnis					Albertosaurus
Melvius	Indeterminate					Albertosaurus
Tototlmimus	T. packardensis	Cabullona Group				Albertosaurus

== See also ==
- List of dinosaur-bearing rock formations
  - List of stratigraphic units with few dinosaur genera
