= McRae Group =

Geologic formation in New Mexico, USA

- Stratigraphic range: Maastrichtian (Lancian); ~70–66 Ma
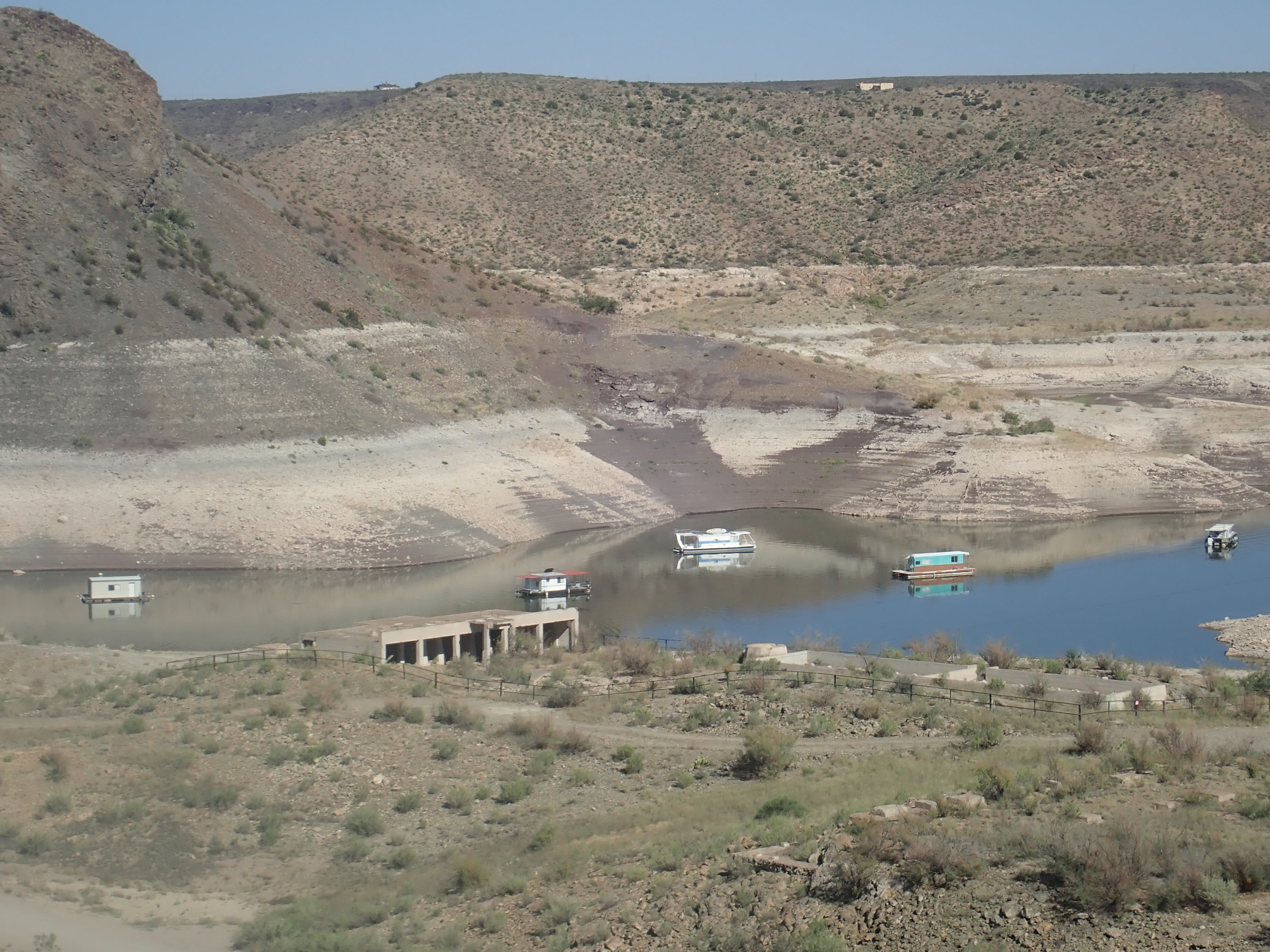
- McRae Group near its type location, Elephant Butte Reservoir, New Mexico, USA. The light bands are "bathtub rings" from stands of the reservoir.
- Type: Geological formation
- Sub-units: Hall Lake Formation, Jose Creek Formation, Double Canyon Formation
- Underlies: Love Ranch Formation
- Overlies: Mesaverde Group
- Thickness: 3,000 ft (910 m)

Lithology
- Primary: Sandstone, shale, conglomerate
- Other: Tuff

Location
- Coordinates: 33.197°N 107.167°W
- Approximate paleocoordinates: 40.4°N 85.7°W
- Region: New Mexico
- Country: United States

Type section
- Named for: Fort McRae
- Named by: Kelley & Silver
- Year defined: 1952
- McRae Group (the United States) McRae Group (New Mexico)

The McRae Group is a geological group exposed in southern New Mexico whose strata, including layers of the Hall Lake Formation and Jose Creek Formation, date to the Late Cretaceous. Dinosaur remains are among the fossils that have been recovered from this unit.

== Description ==
The group consists of a basal conglomerate interbedded with shale and siltstone and a sequence of alternating sandstone and shale. The lower conglomerates contain volcanic debris, while the upper beds contain sparse nonvolcanic rock fragments. The shales are reddish brown to purplish while the sandstones are light gray. The sandstones are medium bedded to massive and sometimes form hogbacks. The total thickness is in excess of 3,000 feet (910 m). The group is present around Elephant Butte Reservoir, in the Caballo Mountains, and under much of the Jornada del Muerto. It overlies the Mesaverde Group, from which it derives much of its sediments. It is overlain by the Love Ranch Formation.

The group is divided into the lower Jose Creek Formation, the middle Hall Lake Formation, and the upper Double Canyon Formation. The Jose Creek Formation is interpreted as mudflow or alluvial fan deposits emplaced in a humid tropical to semitropical environment. It includes distinctive breccia conglomerate beds.

Fossil evidence firmly establishes that most of the McRae Group is late Cretaceous in age. However, it is possible that some of the uppermost beds extend into the Paleocene.

== Fossil content ==
The group contains a floral assemblage that includes Geinitzia cf. formosa, Canna magnifolia, Phyllites cf. ratonensis, Salix, Cinnamomum, Sabalites montana, Araucarites longifolia, Ficus planicostata, and Sequoia.

=== Vertebrate paleofauna ===
W.T. Lee found a ceratopsian skeleton in the area in 1905. Additional vertebrate fossil fragments have been found at twelve locations, generally along the contact between the Jose Creek and Hall Lake members, that include ceratopsian frill and jaw fragments, ankylosaur armor fragments, a sauropod femur, and the holotype specimen of Tyrannosaurus mcraeensis (found by a yachtsman in 1983.) Turtle fossils have also been unearthed here.

- Tyrannosaurus mcraeensis
- Triceratops sp.
- Sierraceratops turneri
- Alamosaurus sp.

== History of investigation ==
The group was first named as the McRae Formation by V.C. Kelley and Caswell Silver in 1952 for Fort McRae. They designated the type location as the base of Elephant Butte and the eastern shore of Elephant Butte Reservoir. H.P. Bushnell divided the formation into members in 1955.

Kenneth Segerstrom and his coinvestigators argued in 1979 that the beds of the Cub Mountain Formation properly belong to the McRae Formation. Spencer G. Lucas and his coinvestigators disagreed on the basis of fossil evidence, placing the former formation in the Eocene.

In 2019, Lucas and his coinvestigators proposed promoting the McRae Formation to group rank and adding the Double Canyon Formation as its uppermost member. The Double Canyon Formation is over 425 meters (1,394 ft) of mudstone with some sandstone and conglomerate found between Elaphant Butte Reservoir and the Fra Cristobal Mountains to the northeast.

== See also ==
- List of dinosaur-bearing rock formations
- Kirtland Formation
