= Hall Lake Formation =

Geologic formation in New Mexico, USA

- Stratigraphic range: Late Cretaceous, Campanian–Maastrichtian; ~83.5–66.0 Ma
- Type: Geological formation
- Unit of: McRae Group
- Underlies: Jose Creek Member
- Overlies: "Quaternary-Tertiary basalt flows and alluvium"

Lithology
- Primary: Mudstone, "shale", sandstone

Location
- Coordinates: 33.2°N 107.1°W
- Approximate paleocoordinates: 40.5°N 81.1°W
- Region: New Mexico
- Country: United States
- Hall Lake Formation (the United States) Hall Lake Formation (New Mexico)

The Hall Lake Formation, formerly called the Hall Lake Member, is a geological formation in Sierra County, New Mexico preserving Lancian fauna, most notably dinosaurs. It is regarded as a member of the McRae Group, including the Elephant Butte and Staton-LaPoint locales.

== Description ==
While most estimates place it firmly within the Lancian fauna, specifically using taxa such as Compsemys as index fossils to recover a Campanian-Maastrichtian age, Lozinsky et al. (1984) note the presence of basalt flows and alluvium dating to the Quaternary-Tertiary.

It overlooks the Jose Creek Member and is composed of purple and maroon shales. When they meet, it is marked by a basal conglomerate or a color distinction where conglomerate is absent. Various Cenozoic units overly the formation. Where some choose to classify these layers as a member of the McRae Formation, others classify it as a distinct formation in a group of formations.

== Fossil content ==
=== Dinosaurs ===
==== Saurischians ====
Color key: Taxon / Reclassified taxon / Taxon falsely reported as present / Dubious taxon or junior synonym / Ichnotaxon / Ootaxon / Morphotaxon

Notes
Uncertain or tentative taxa are in small text
~~crossed out~~ taxa are discredited.

Genus	Species	Locality	Material	Notes	Images
Tyrannosauridae	indet.	Staton-LaPoint	TKM001, dorsal vertebral centrum	Lozinsky et al. (1984) call it indeterminate	
Tyrannosaurus	T. mcraeensis	Elephant Butte (upper)	NMMNH P-3698, a partial skull, lower jaw bones, teeth, and chevrons		
Alamosaurus	sp.	upper	TKM007, a damaged humerus	Tentative referral	
Sauropoda				Possibly from the Jose Creek Member	
Theropoda				Possibly from the Jose Creek Member	

==== Ornithischians ====
Color key: Taxon / Reclassified taxon / Taxon falsely reported as present / Dubious taxon or junior synonym / Ichnotaxon / Ootaxon / Morphotaxon

Notes
Uncertain or tentative taxa are in small text
~~crossed out~~ taxa are discredited.

Taxon	Locality	Material	Notes	Images
Triceratops sp.	2 miles south of Elephant Butte	USNM 243, dorsal vertebral centrum	This genus, Torosaurus or a novel taxon	
Sierraceratops turneri	Elephant Butte (lower)	Partial skeleton with skull		
Ceratopsidae	Elephant Butte (upper)	TKM002, a coranoid; TKM020, crest fragment	A new genus similar to Torosaurus is said to exist above the base of the formation	
Ceratopsidae	Elephant Butte (lower)	TKM002, a coranoid; TKM020, crest fragment	Indeterminate, in abundance	
Torosaurus sp.	Elephant Butte (upper)?			
Hadrosauridae	cannot be determined		Indeterminate and of unknown origins due to faulting or Quaternary cover	
Ankylosauria		TKM011, pyramidal bone fragment	Possibly from the Jose Creek Member, near identical from UNM-FKK-001P of the Kirtland Formation	

=== Reptiles ===
Taxon	Locality	Material	Notes
Testudinata	Elephant Butte (upper)		
Crocodylia	Elephant Butte (upper)		
Compsemys			Index fossils suggesting a Lancian age
Bothremydidae			Index fossils suggesting a Lancian age

=== Plants ===
Genus	Species	Locality	Material	Notes
Araucarites	A. sp.			
Cinnamomum	C. sp.			
Exnelumbites	E. morphotype 2		Leaves	A member of Nelumbonaceae
Ficus	F. sp.			
Phyllites	P. sp.			
Sabal	S. sp.			
Sabalites	S. sp.			
Salix	S. sp.			
Sequoia	S. sp.			
Tracheophyta	Indeterminate	2 miles south of Elephant Butte		
Viburnum	V. sp.			
