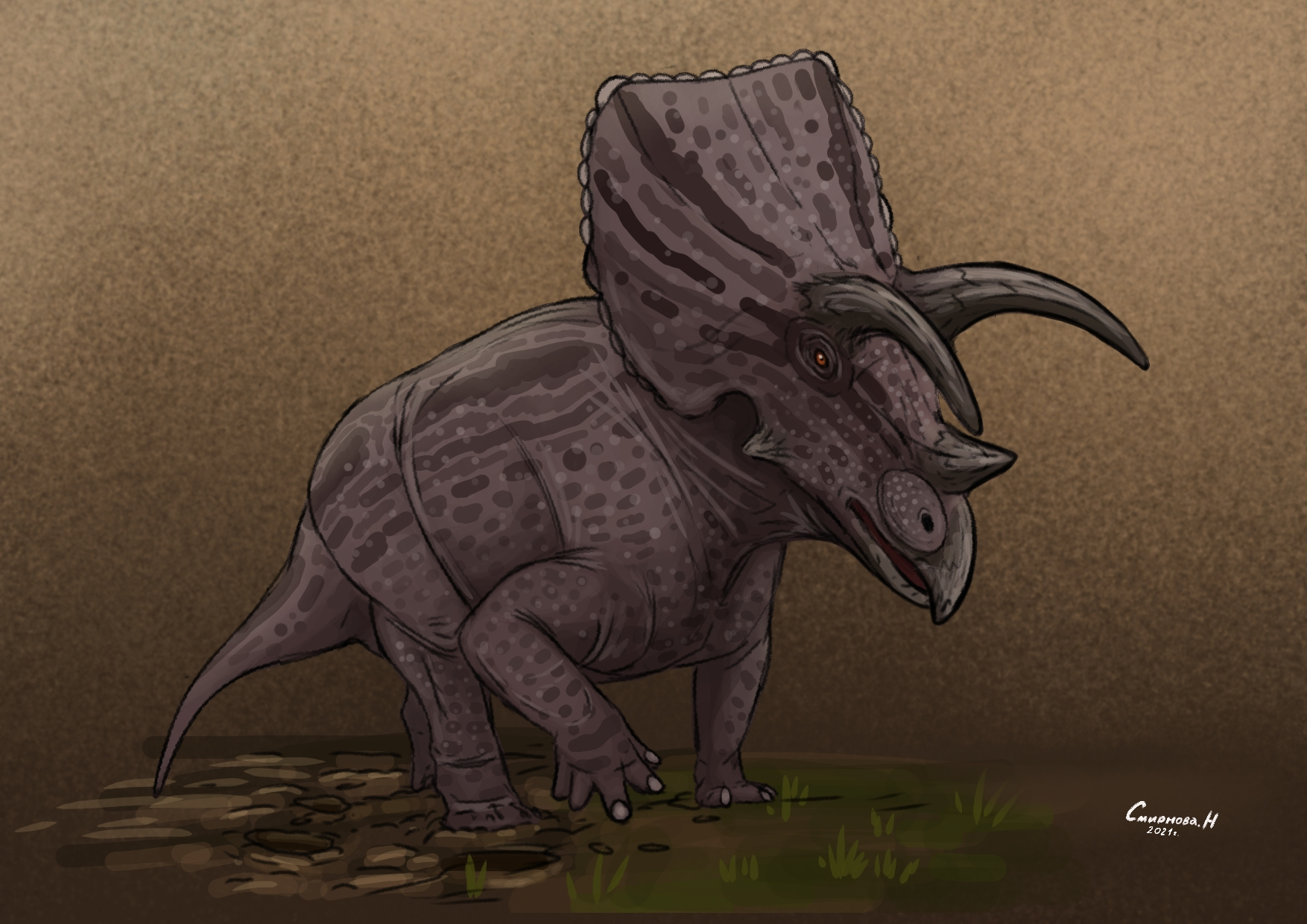
- Life restoration

Scientific classification
- Kingdom: Animalia
- Phylum: Chordata
- Class: Reptilia
- Clade: Dinosauria
- Clade: †Ornithischia
- Clade: †Ceratopsia
- Family: †Ceratopsidae
- Subfamily: †Chasmosaurinae
- Genus: †Sierraceratops; Dalman et al., 2022
- Species: †S. turneri

Binomial name
- †Sierraceratops turneri Dalman et al., 2022

= Sierraceratops =

Sierraceratops Temporal range: Late Cretaceous, ~Campanian–Maastrichtian

Genus of ceratopsian dinosaur

Sierraceratops (meaning "Sierra horned face") is a genus of chasmosaurine ceratopsian dinosaur from the Late Cretaceous Hall Lake Formation of New Mexico, United States. The genus contains a single species, Sierraceratops turneri, known from a partial skeleton discovered in 1997.

== Discovery ==
In 1997, geologist Gregory H. Mack discovered fossils of a large horned dinosaur on the Armendaris ranch of Ted Turner, founder of CNN, near Truth or Consequences in Sierra County, New Mexico. They had been exposed on the surface by erosion. A team of the New Mexico Museum of Natural History and Science subsequently uncovered more bones with the cooperation of the ranch manager, Tom Wadell. In 1998, the discovery was reported in the scientific literature and referred to Torosaurus latus. More fossils were collected in 2014, 2015, and 2016. They were first prepared by volunteers and later by Sebastian Dalman.

In 2021, the type species Sierraceratops turneri was named and described by Sebastian G. Dalman, Spencer G. Lucas, Steven E. Jasinski, and Nicholas R. Longrich; the final article version was published in 2022. The generic name combines a reference to Sierra County with the Greek keras, "horn", and ops, "face", a common suffix in ceratopsian names. The specific name honours Turner.

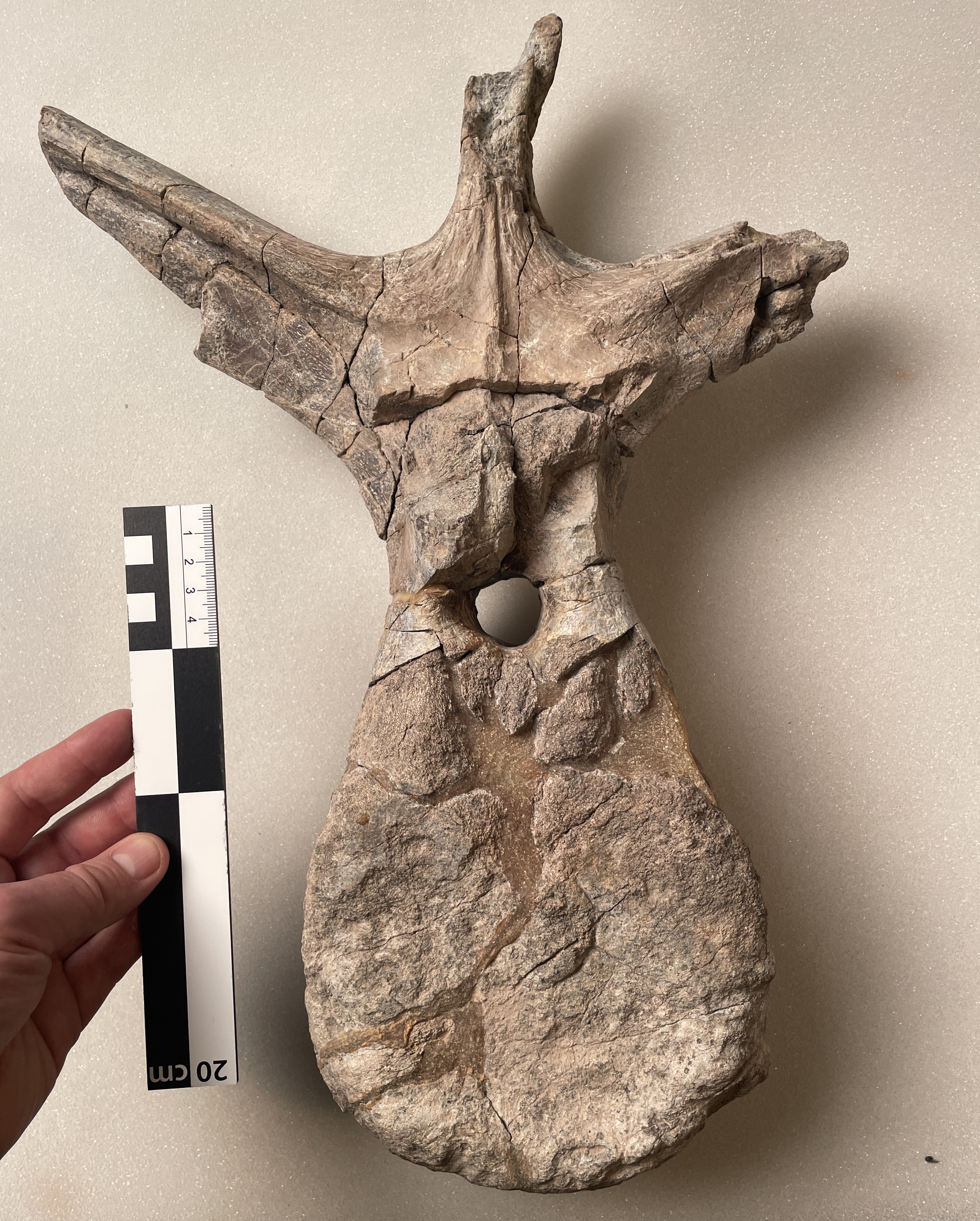
A holotype dorsal vertebra of Sierraceratops

The holotype, NMMNH P-76870, was found in a layer of the Hall Lake Formation, dating from the Campanian-Maastrichtian, about seventy-two million years old. It consists of a partial skeleton with skull. It preserves a left premaxilla, a jugal bone with epijugal, a right postorbital horn core, a quadrate, a quadratojugal, the interparietal bar, a squamosal, a pterygoid, a rear left dentary, two neck vertebrae, two back vertebrae, sacral vertebrae, two ribs, a shoulder blade connected to a coracoid, an ulna, a hand claw and an ilium. About 16% of the skeleton has been preserved. It was disarticulated but the various elements were found in close association in a natural position. The fossils are part of the collection of the New Mexico Museum of Natural History & Science.

== Description ==
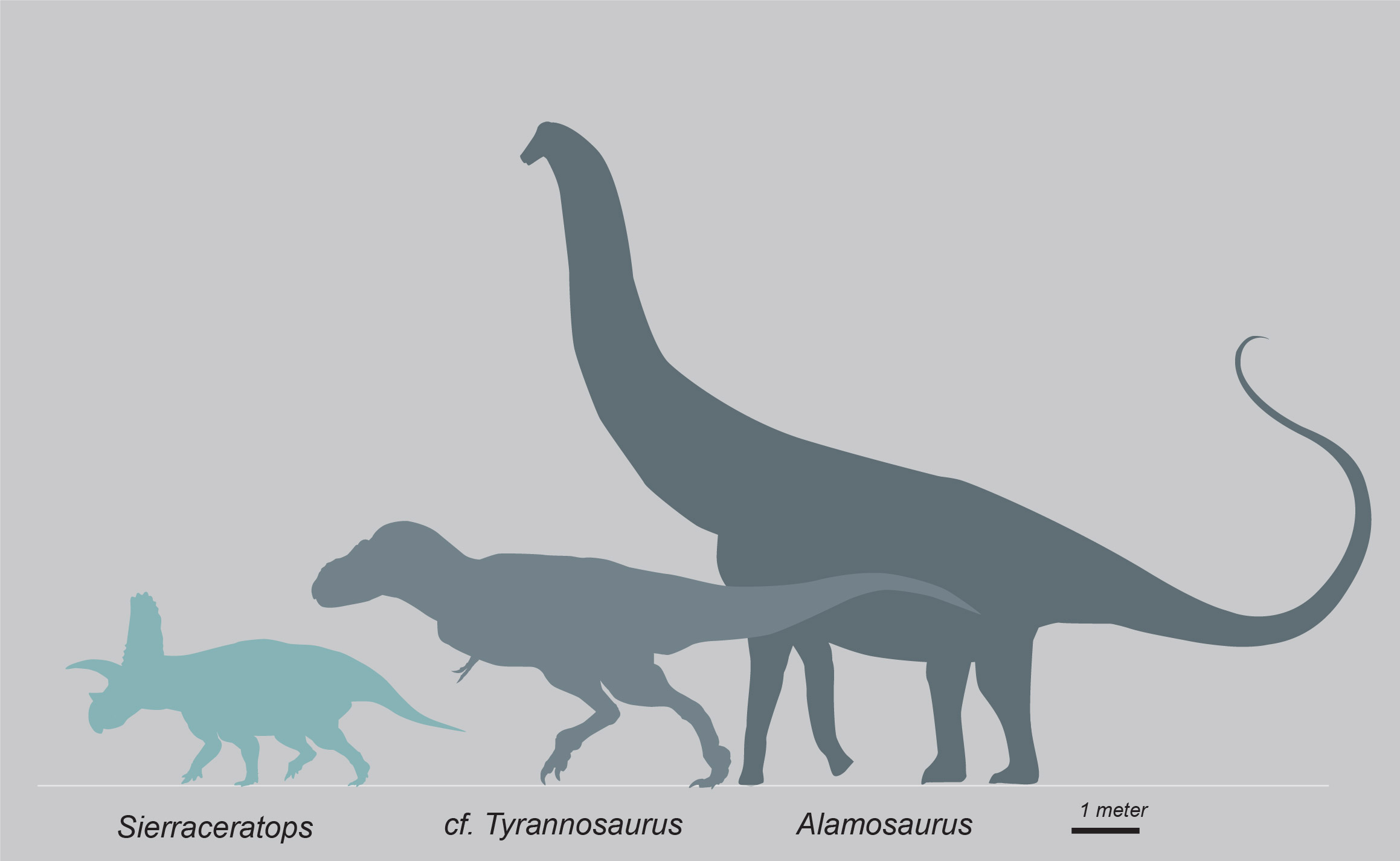
Sierraceratops compared to other Hall Lake Formation fauna

Sierraceratops was a medium-sized horned dinosaur. Compared to other chasmosaurs, it has short but massive brow horns that are relatively short and robust and a long cheek horn on the jugal. The frill was relatively long and had large holes, the parietal fenestrae, separated by an oval-shaped midline bar.

== Classification ==
Sierraceratops was originally referred to the genus Torosaurus, based in part on the assumption that the fossils dated to the Late Maastrichtian. Closer study later revealed that the animal was distinct from Torosaurus; Torosaurus has a flat midline bar of the parietal, while that of Sierraceratops is oval. Furthermore, radiometric dates suggest that the animal is significantly older than Torosaurus, dating to the latest Campanian or early Maastrichtian, rather than the late Maastrichtian.

Phylogenetic analysis by Dalman et al. (2022) recovered Sierraceratops as a sister species to Bravoceratops and Coahuilaceratops, part of a group endemic to the southwestern United States and Mexico. This further proves that there was a high level of endemism in southern Laramidia during the latest Cretaceous.

- Chasmosaurinae
  - Mercuriceratops
  - - Judiceratops
    - - - Chasmosaurus
        - - Agujaceratops mariscalensis
          - Mojoceratops
      - - Agujaceratops mavericus
        - - - Pentaceratops aquilonius
            - Williams Fork chasmosaur
            - - Pentaceratops sternbergii
              - Utahceratops
              - Navajoceratops
              - Terminocavus
          - - - Kosmoceratops
              - Spiclypeus
            - - - NMMNH-50000
                - Almond Formation chasmosaur
              - - Anchiceratops
                - - - Arrhinoceratops
                    - Triceratopsini
                  - - Bravoceratops
                    - Coahuilaceratops
                    - Sierraceratops
