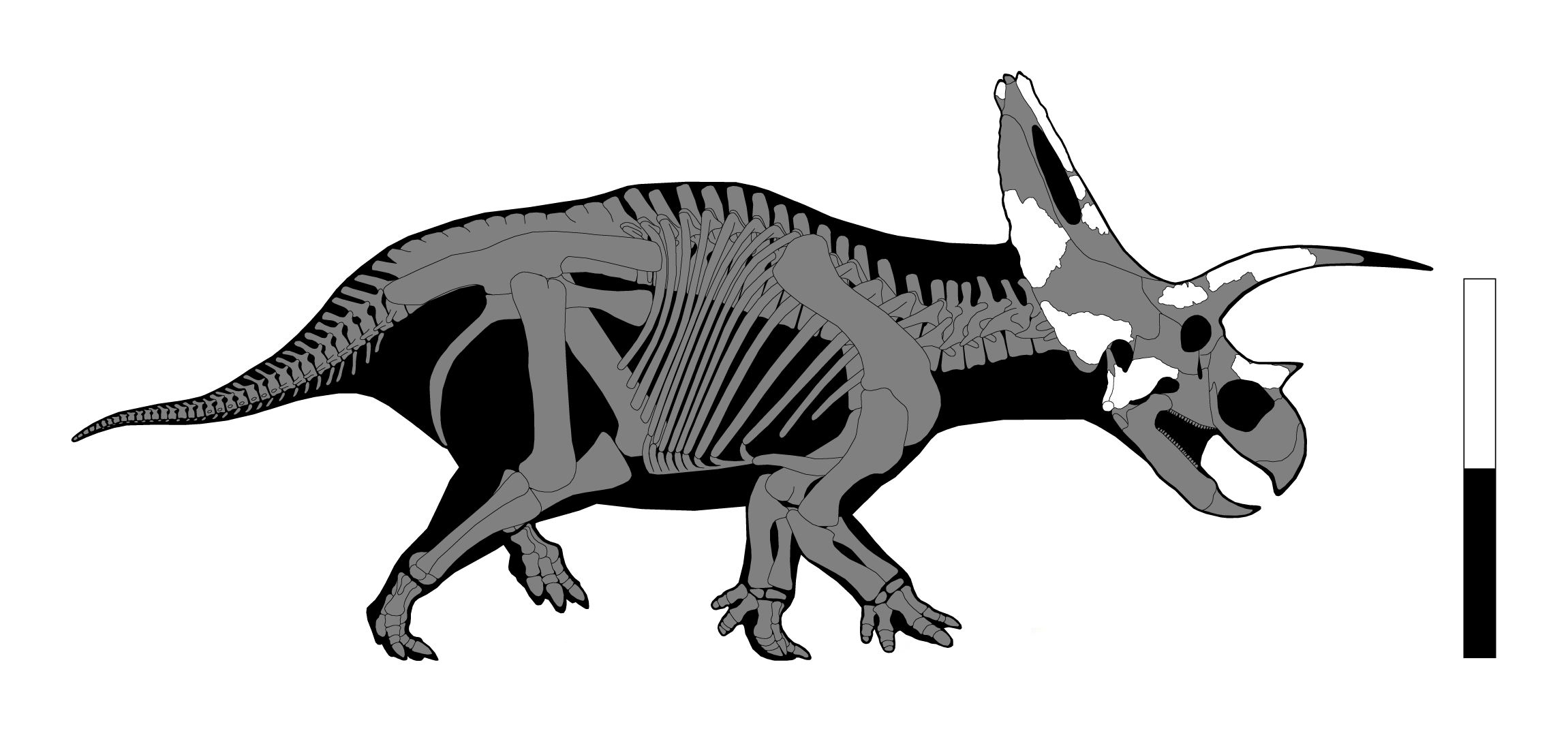
- Hypothetical restoration of the skeleton with the holotype material in white

Scientific classification
- Kingdom: Animalia
- Phylum: Chordata
- Class: Reptilia
- Clade: Dinosauria
- Clade: †Ornithischia
- Clade: †Ceratopsia
- Family: †Ceratopsidae
- Subfamily: †Chasmosaurinae
- Genus: †Bravoceratops; Wick & Lehman, 2013

Type species
- †Bravoceratops polyphemus Wick & Lehman, 2013

= Bravoceratops =

Bravoceratops Temporal range: Late Cretaceous, 70 Ma

Extinct genus of dinosaurs

Bravoceratops is a genus of large chasmosaurine ceratopsid dinosaur that lived approximately 70 million years ago, and is known from the Late Cretaceous Javelina Formation in what is now Texas, United States.

== Discovery and naming ==
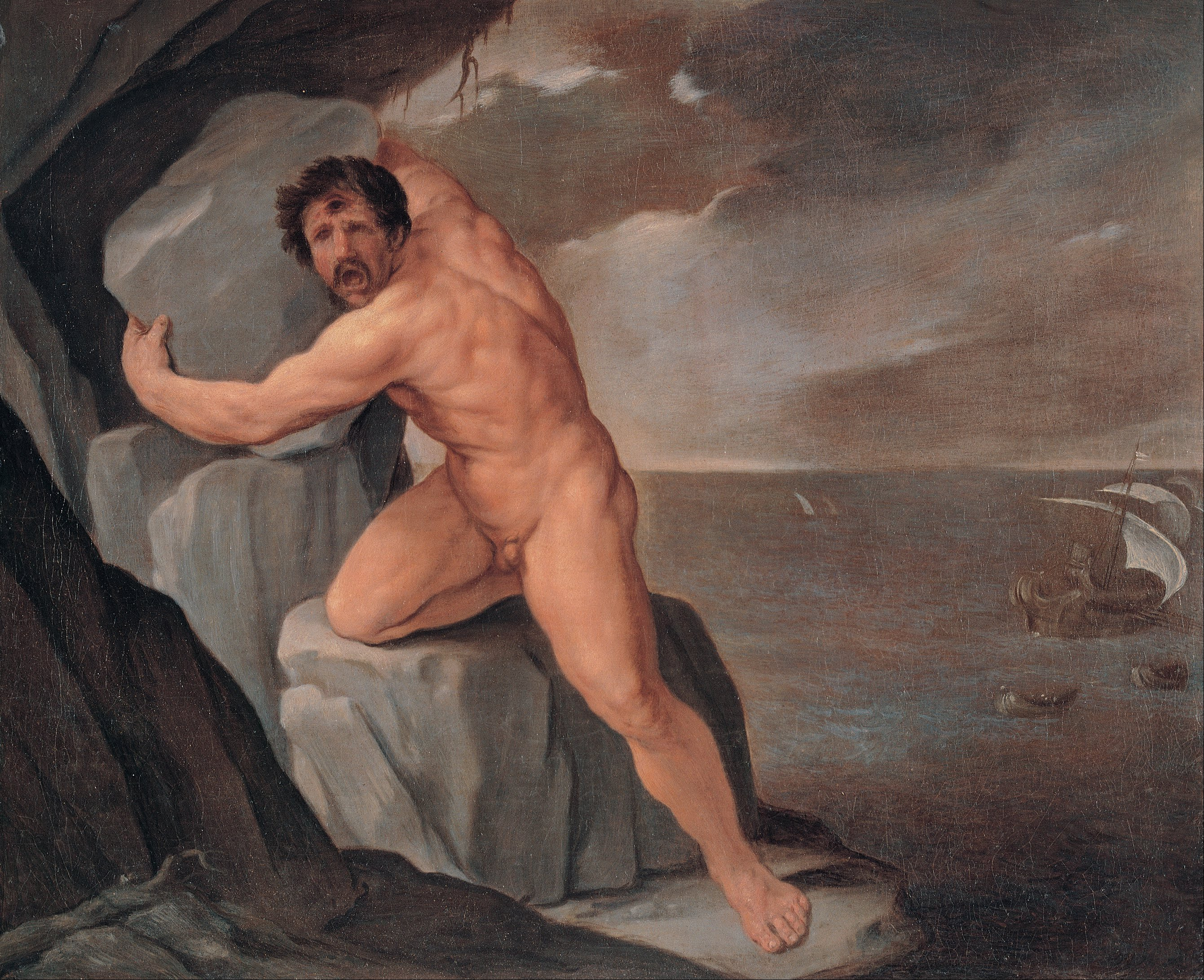
Polyphemus, mythological namesake of the species

Bravoceratops is only known from the holotype specimen TxVP 46015-1; it is housed in the Texas Vertebrate Paleontology Collections, Austin, Texas. The skull consists of a number of fragments, altogether including: the braincase, parts of each brow horn, the rear end of the left postorbital, assorted parts of the nasal area and horn, the jugals, quadrates and quadratojugals from each side, a section of the parietal and epiparietals, multiple parts of the dentary, and some of the right squamosal. It was recovered from the lowermost rocks of the Javelina Formation, in Big Bend National Park; ceratopsid fossils are uncommon in this formation, giving the discovery of Bravoceratops importance in clarifying the groups' diversity. The specimen was found in sandy conglomerate sediment at the Hippiewalk geologic locality. Signs of erosion are presented in the larger bone fragments, which were found disorganized over an area of ten square metres; the site is thought to have been a lag deposit of a river, only most durable extremities able to survive preservation. The animal would have lived during the late Campanian or early Maastrichtian stage of the Cretaceous period, approximately 70 million years ago.

The genus name means "wild horn-face", and is derived from the Mexican name for the Rio Grande, "Rio Bravo del Norte" (wild river of the north), and the Greek words "keras" (κέρας) meaning "horn" and "ops" (ὤψ) referring to the "face". The specific name polyphemus, refers to the giant cyclops Polyphemus confronted by Odysseus in the Greek epic poem, The Odyssey. This is in reference to the presumption that it had a single central horn on the surface of the frill, recalling the placement of a Cyclops' eye. The genus was described and named by Steven L. Wick and Thomas M. Lehman in 2013 and the type species is Bravoceratops polyphemus.

== Description ==
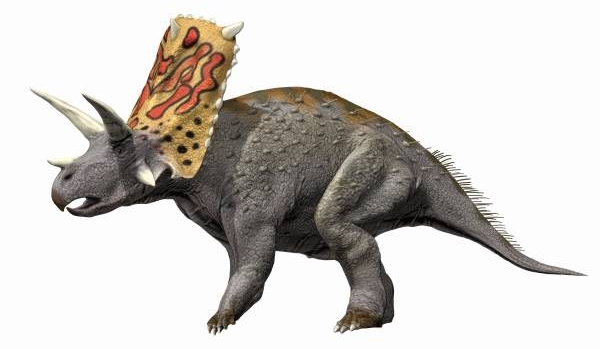
Life reconstruction showing the originally suggested midline horn at the top of the frill, which may be inaccurate

Two autapomorphies (unique derived traits) were originally proposed. Firstly, the median parietal bar (which runs down the middle of the frill between its large holes) at mid-length splays out to the rear like a fan and its rear edge is not notched or embayed. Secondly, the upper surface of the bar is, at the midline, hollowed out by a symmetrical depression. It is this hollow in the form of an inverted tear that occasioned the specific name as it resembled the single eye of a cyclops, thus the allusion with Polyphemus. The authors assumed it formed the base of an epiparietal, or small horn, unpreserved in the fossil. In 2020, paleontologists Denver W. Fowler and Elizabeth A. Freedman Fowler suggested that the parietal median bar of the specimen had been reconstructed upside down, and that the genus therefore did not have any distinguishing features among chasmosaurines, making it a nomen dubium, or invalid genus. However, a number of authors considered the genus valid (see classification below) and it was included as part of a southwest clade of chasmosaurines by Dalman et al., (2021).

Unlike Fowler and Freedman-Folwer, Sebastian G. Dalman and colleagues, in a 2021 paper naming the related genus Sierraceratops, treated Bravoceratops as valid, noting both distinct traits and those unique to it and Sierraceratops. A flange in front of its quadrate near the jugal bones is present, large as in Sierraceratops while small or not present in other chasmosaurs. The epijugal, a small horn on the jugals, is longer than tall and sharp on its tip, as in Sierraceratops and unlike other derived chasmosaurines. The two brow horns are compressed, being taller than wide rather than conical, a trait shared with Sierraceratops and the distantly related Judiceratops. The cross section of the lower bar of its parietal bar has a D-shape shared with Sierraceratops and similar but not identical to that of Coahuilaceratops, but unlike other chasmosaurines. Bravoceratops is distinguishable from Coahuilaceratops in lacking enormous brow horns; it is distinguishable from Sierraceratops in having larger brow horns and a smaller epijugal horn.

== Classification ==
Bravoceratops is assigned to the Chasmosaurinae. It is an "intermediate" form of chasmosaurine; it, along with genera like Pentaceratops and Anchiceratops, was distinctly more derived ("advanced") than forms like Chasmosaurus but less so than taxa like Triceratops. Its position in a phylogenetic analysis performed by Wick and Lehman (2013), who first named the taxon. It was found that Bravoceratops may be the sister taxon of Coahuilaceratops (a relationship later supported by Dalman et al., 2021). The first analysis, with unmodified characters from a previous study, found the pair to be relatively basal . The second, with two added characters, instead found Bravoceratops to be a relatively derived taxon. Both positions were considered to be somewhat unintuitive; several of its derived characters would be odd for a taxon in the basal position, but the genus also possessed primitive characters would require evolutionary reversals if the more derived position was correct. Regardless, the more derived placement was considered to be somewhat more likely. The first tree is reproduced on the left, and the second on the right:

- - Chasmosaurus
  - - Mojoceratops
    - - Agujaceratops
      - - - Utahceratops
          - Pentaceratops
        - - - Coahuilaceratops
            - Bravoceratops
          - - - Vagaceratops
              - Kosmoceratops
            - - Anchiceratops
              - - Arrhinoceratops
                - Triceratopsini

- - Chasmosaurus
  - - Mojoceratops
    - - Agujaceratops
      - - - Utahceratops
          - Pentaceratops
        - - - Vagaceratops
            - Kosmoceratops
          - - Anchiceratops
            - - Arrhinoceratops
              - Triceratopsini
                - - Coahuilaceratops
                  - Bravoceratops
                - More derived Triceratopsini

Future studies found trees showing the derived position, with Bravoceratops found related to Arrhinoceratops and Triceratopsini. However, the fragmentary nature of Bravoceratops caused it to generally be removed from phylogenetic analyses, as it was a wildcard taxon (meaning it was unstable and caused poorer results). Fowler and Freedman Fowler (2020) recovered Bravoceratops in the more basal position, and, similar to Wick and Lehman (2013), found it close to Pentaceratops, and once again sister to Coahuilaceratops. However, they also decided to remove it from their analysis due to their conclusion the taxon was invalid. However, Dalman et al. (2021) supported the validity of the genus, arguing that Bravoceratops shared a number morphological traits with other chasmosaurines from the same time and region. As a result, Bravoceratops was determined to be part of a clade endemic to the Southwestern United States, including Coahuilaceratops from Mexico and Sierraceratops from New Mexico.

== See also ==
- Timeline of ceratopsian research
