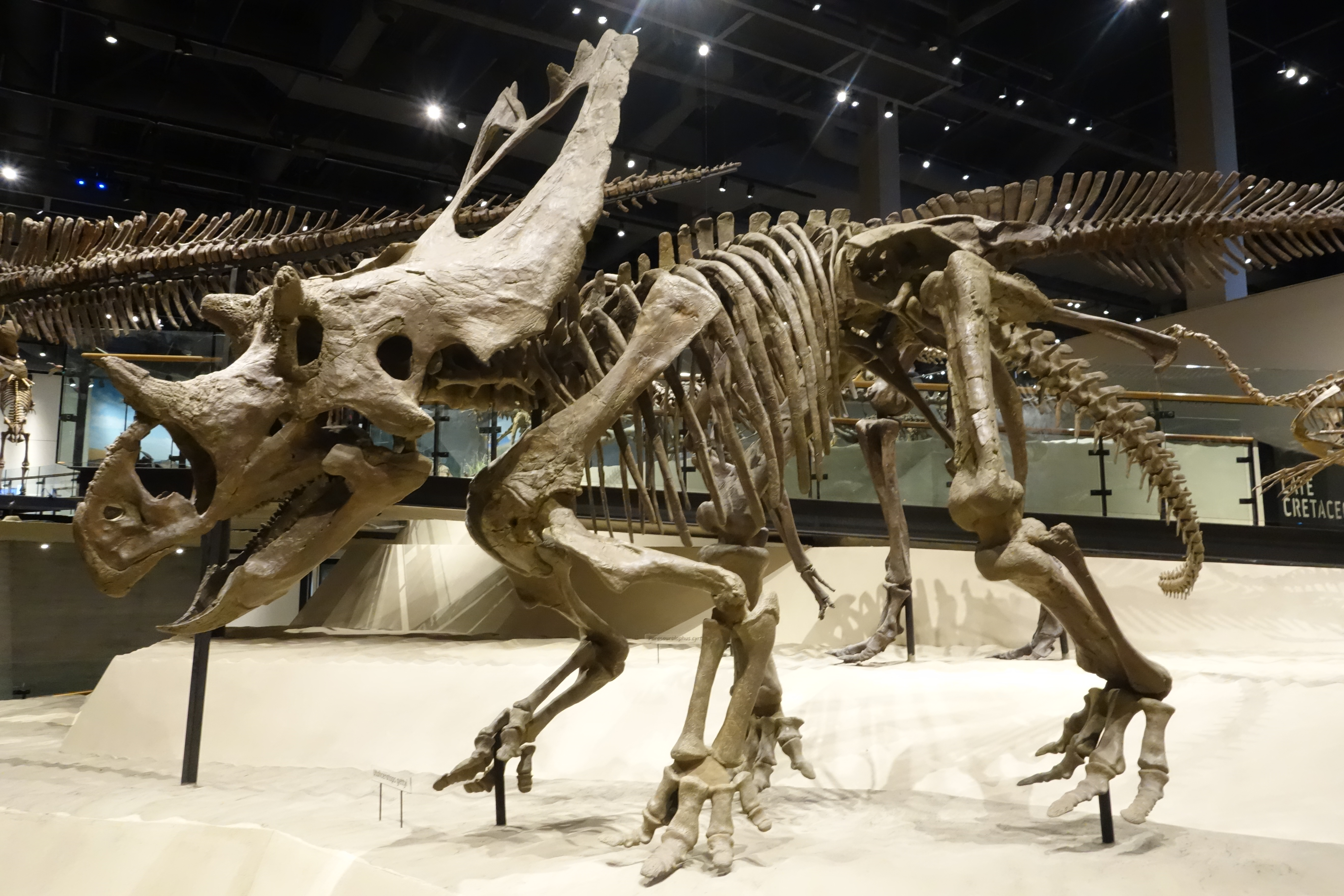
- Reconstructed skeleton, Natural History Museum of Utah

Scientific classification
- Kingdom: Animalia
- Phylum: Chordata
- Class: Reptilia
- Clade: Dinosauria
- Clade: †Ornithischia
- Clade: †Ceratopsia
- Family: †Ceratopsidae
- Subfamily: †Chasmosaurinae
- Genus: †Utahceratops; Sampson et al., 2010
- Species: †U. gettyi

Binomial name
- †Utahceratops gettyi Sampson et al., 2010

= Utahceratops =

Utahceratops Temporal range: Late Cretaceous, 76.4–75.5 Ma

Extinct genus of dinosaurs

Utahceratops is an extinct genus of ceratopsian dinosaur that lived approximately 76.4~75.5 million years ago during the Late Cretaceous period in what is now Utah. Utahceratops was a large-sized, robustly-built, ground-dwelling, quadrupedal herbivore, that could grow up to an estimated 4.5–5 m (15–16 ft) long.

== Discovery ==
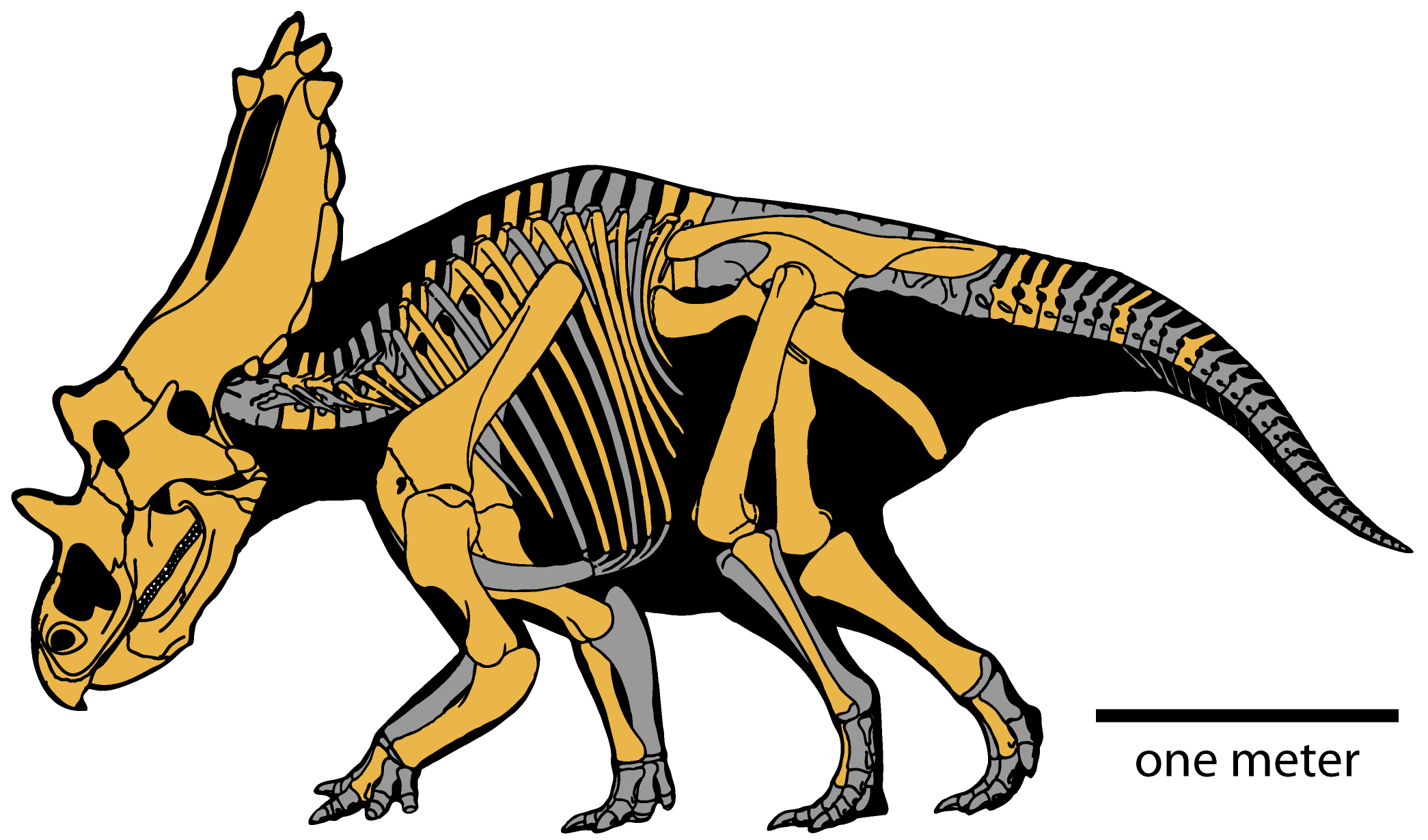
Reconstructed skeleton with known elements in yellow

The genus name Utahceratops, means "horned face from Utah", and is derived from the state of Utah and Greek words "keras" (κέρας) meaning "horn" and "ops" (ὤψ) referring to the "face". The specific name gettyi, is derived from the name of Mike Getty, who discovered the holotype and has played a pivotal role in the recovery of fossils from the Grand Staircase–Escalante National Monument (GSENM). It was first named by Scott D. Sampson, Mark A. Loewen, Andrew A. Farke, Eric M. Roberts, Catherine A. Forster, Joshua A. Smith and Alan L. Titus in 2010, and the type species is Utahceratops gettyi.

== Description ==
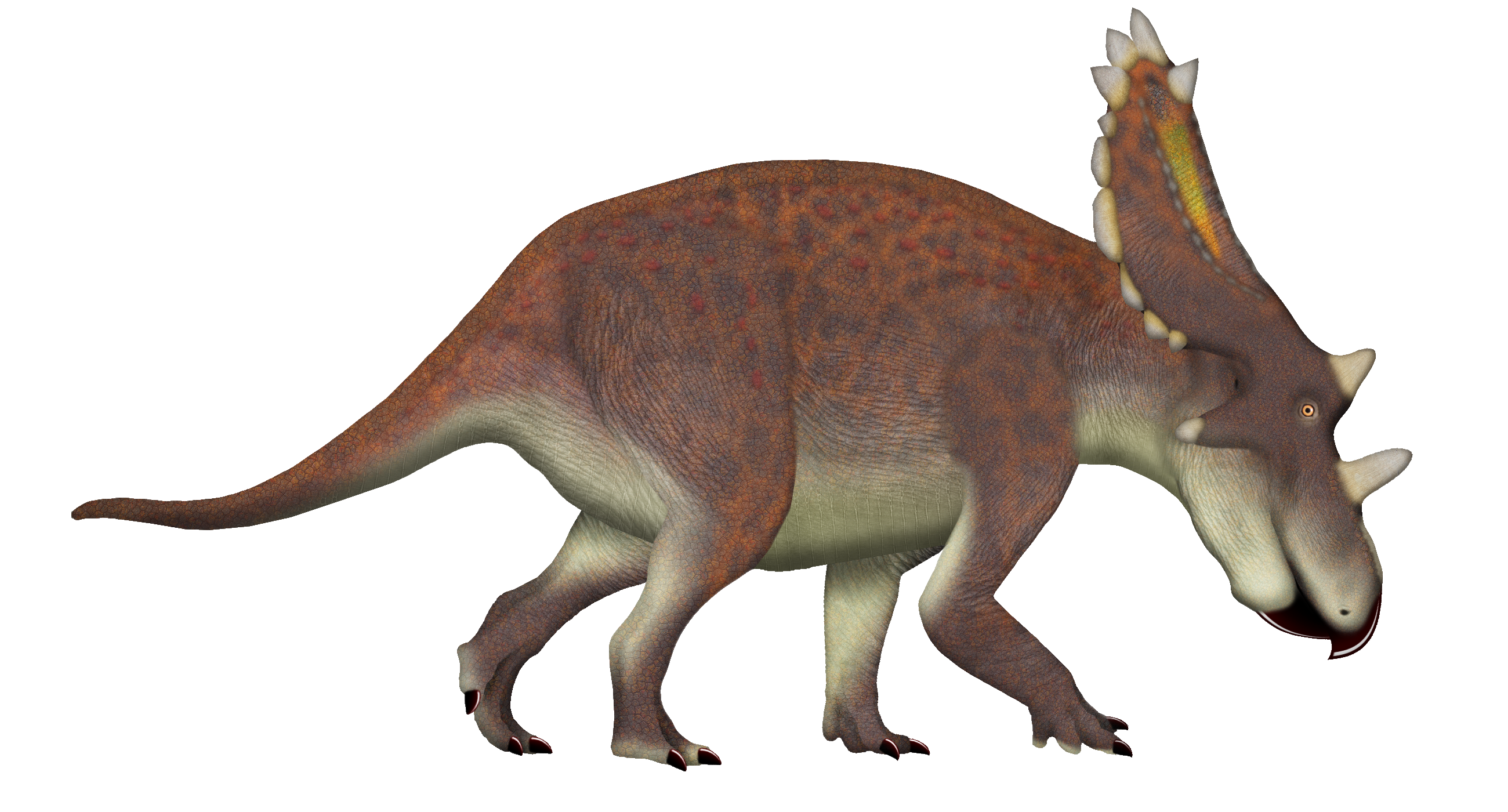
Restoration

The holotype specimen UMNH VP 16784, consists of only a partial skull. This genus is known from six specimens, including two partial skulls, which when taken together preserve about 96% of the skull and 70% of the postcranial skeleton. Utahceratops are estimated to have measured 4.5–5 metres (14.8–16.4 ft) in length and 2 tonnes (2.2 tons) in weight.

According to Sampson et al. (2010), Utahceratops can be distinguished based on the following characteristics: the nasal horncore is caudally positioned, almost entirely behind external naris; the supraorbital horncores are short, robust, dorsolaterally directed, and oblate in shape with a blunt tip; the episquamosals on the mid-portion of the lateral frill margin are low and extremely elongate (some >10 cm long); and the median portion of transverse bar of the parietal bone is rostrally curved.

== Classification ==
Size comparison

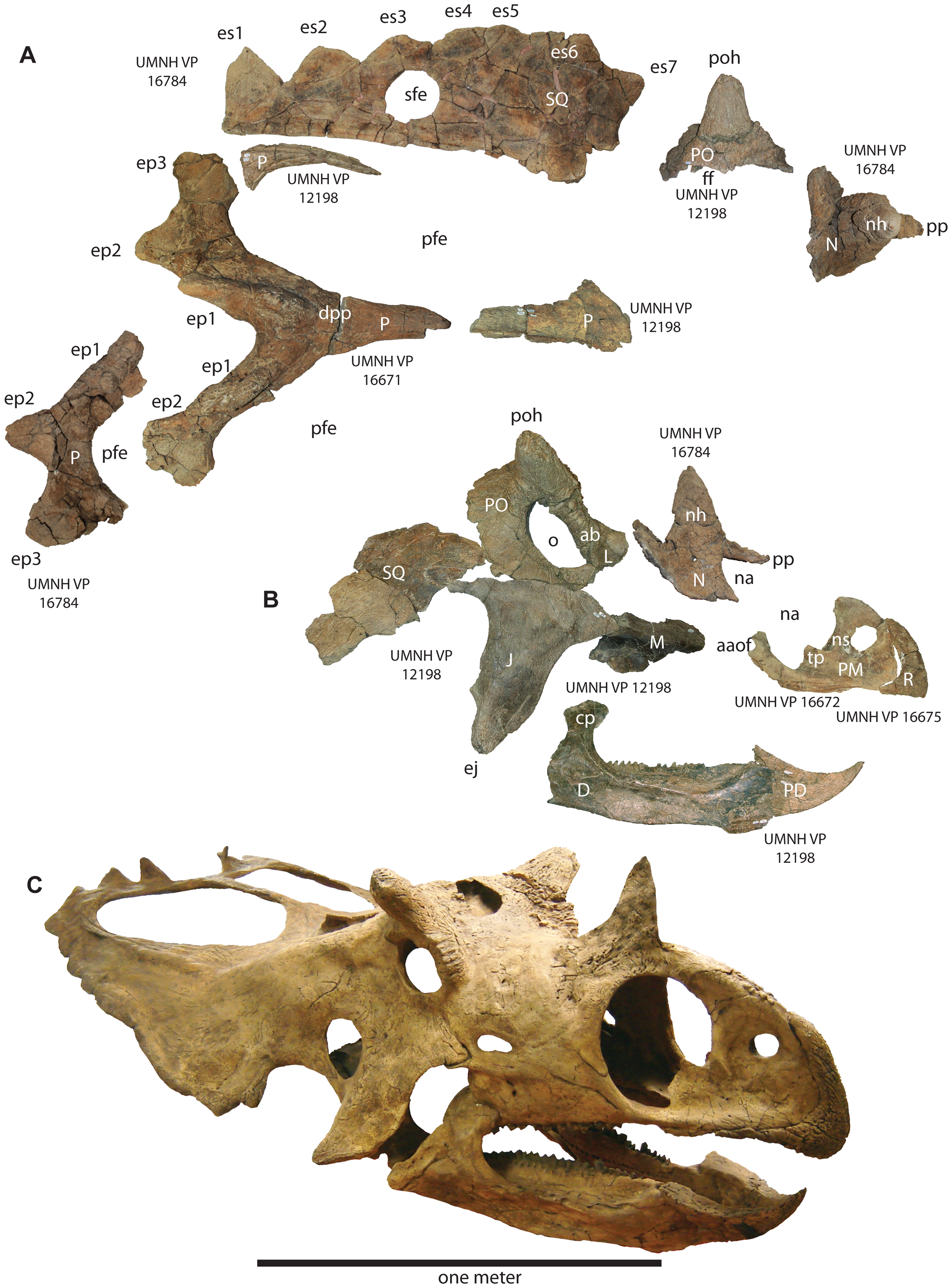
Selected craniofacial elements

Utahceratops has been classified as a basal chasmosaurine ceratopsian. It has been found to be in a clade of basal chasmosaurines with Pentaceratops.

The below cladogram follows Longrich (2014), who named a new species of Pentaceratops, and included nearly all chasmosaurine species.

- Chasmosaurinae
  - Mercuriceratops
  - - Judiceratops
    - - - Chasmosaurus
          - Chasmosaurus sp. CMN 2280
          - - Chasmosaurus belli
            - Chasmosaurus irvinensis
        - Mojoceratops
      - - Agujaceratops
        - - - Pentaceratops aquilonius
            - Williams Fork chasmosaur
            - - Pentaceratops sternbergii
              - Utahceratops
          - - Kosmoceratops
              - Kosmoceratops richardsoni
              - Kosmoceratops sp. CMN 8301
            - - - Anchiceratops
                - Almond Formation chasmosaur
              - - - Bravoceratops
                  - Coahuilaceratops
                - - Arrhinoceratops
                  - Triceratopsini
                    - Titanoceratops
                    - - Torosaurus
                      - Triceratops
                        - T. utahensis
                        - - T. horridus
                          - T. prorsus

== Paleoecology ==
=== Habitat ===
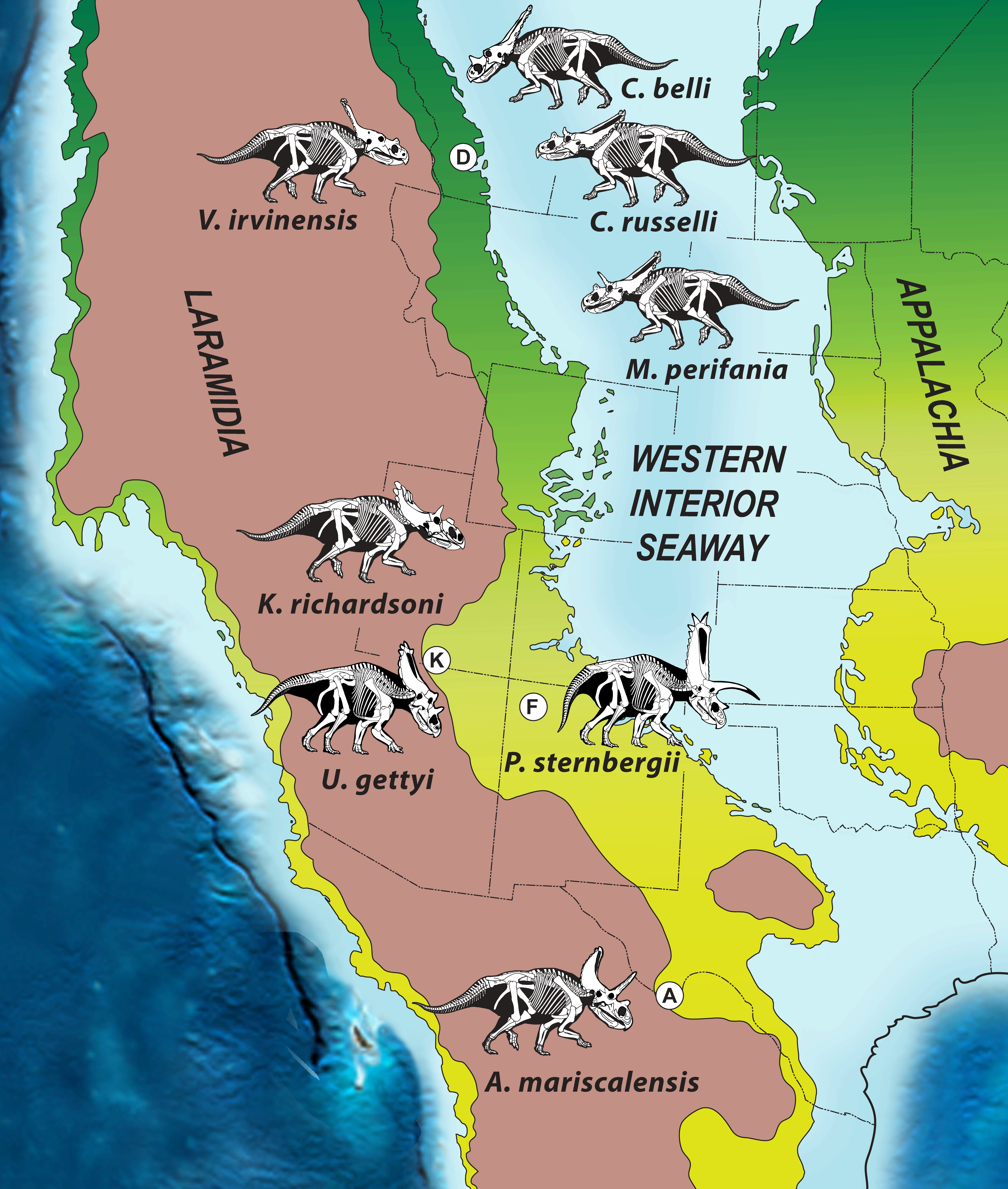
North America about 75 mya, location the discovery of Utahceratops shown

The only known specimen of Utahceratops was recovered at the Kaiparowits Formation, in Utah. Argon-argon radiometric dating indicates that the Kaiparowits Formation was deposited between 76.6 and 74.5 million years ago, during the Campanian stage of the Late Cretaceous period. During the Late Cretaceous period, the site of the Kaiparowits Formation was located near the western shore of the Western Interior Seaway, a large inland sea that split North America into two landmasses, Laramidia to the west and Appalachia to the east. The plateau where dinosaurs lived was an ancient floodplain dominated by large channels and abundant wetland peat swamps, ponds and lakes, and was bordered by highlands. The climate was wet and humid, and supported an abundant and diverse range of organisms. This formation contains one of the best and most continuous records of Late Cretaceous terrestrial life in the world.

=== Paleofauna ===
Restoration of a Teratophoneus group chasing Utahceratops

Utahceratops shared its paleoenvironment with other dinosaurs, such as dromaeosaurid theropods, the troodontid Talos sampsoni, tyrannosaurids like Teratophoneus, armored ankylosaurids, the duckbilled hadrosaurs Parasaurolophus cyrtocristatus and Gryposaurus monumentensis, the ceratopsians Nasutoceratops titusi and Kosmoceratops richardsoni and the oviraptorosaurian Hagryphus giganteus. Some fossil evidence suggests the presence of the tyrannosaurid Albertosaurus and the ornithomimid Ornithomimus velox, but the existing assessment of the material is not conclusive. Paleofauna present in the Kaiparowits Formation included chondrichthyans (sharks and rays), frogs, salamanders, turtles, lizards and crocodilians. A variety of early mammals were present including multituberculates, marsupials, and insectivorans.

== See also ==
- Timeline of ceratopsian research
