= Lancian =

North American faunal stage

The Lancian was a North American faunal stage of the Late Cretaceous. It was the final stage of the Cretaceous period in North America, lasting from approximately 70.6 to 66 million years ago.

== Geology ==
Terrestrial sedimentary strata from the Judithian to the Lancian are generally regressive throughout the entire sequence, so the preserved changes in fossil communities represent not only phylogenetic changes but ecological zones from the submontane habitats to near-sea level coastal habitats.

== Paleobiogeography ==
By the Lancian, the crested hadrosaurs are no longer the dominant inhabitant of any province of western North America; the only remaining species was Hypacrosaurus. Lehman records three surviving chasmosaurs, Triceratops, Torosaurus and Nedoceratops, with the possibility of the recently discovered Ojoceratops, Regaliceratops and Bravoceratops. It has recently been suggested that Triceratops and Torosaurus may be synonymous, though this is still up for debate. Saurolophine dinosaurs like Edmontosaurus, Kritosaurus, Saurolophus as well as the recently discovered Augustynolophus were some of the known surviving hadrosaurs. All lacked the elaborate ornamentation of their predecessors, the lambeosaurs. The ankylosaurs had been reduced to down to a handful of species, with ankylosaurs like Anodontosaurus and Ankylosaurus, as well as nodosaurs like Denversaurus, Edmontonia and Glyptodontopelta being the only known survivors. In the south the transition to the Lancian is even more dramatic, which Lehman describes as "the abrupt reemergence of a fauna with a superficially "Jurassic" aspect." These faunas are dominated by Alamosaurus and feature abundant Quetzalcoatlus, Bravoceratops and Ojoceratops in Texas.

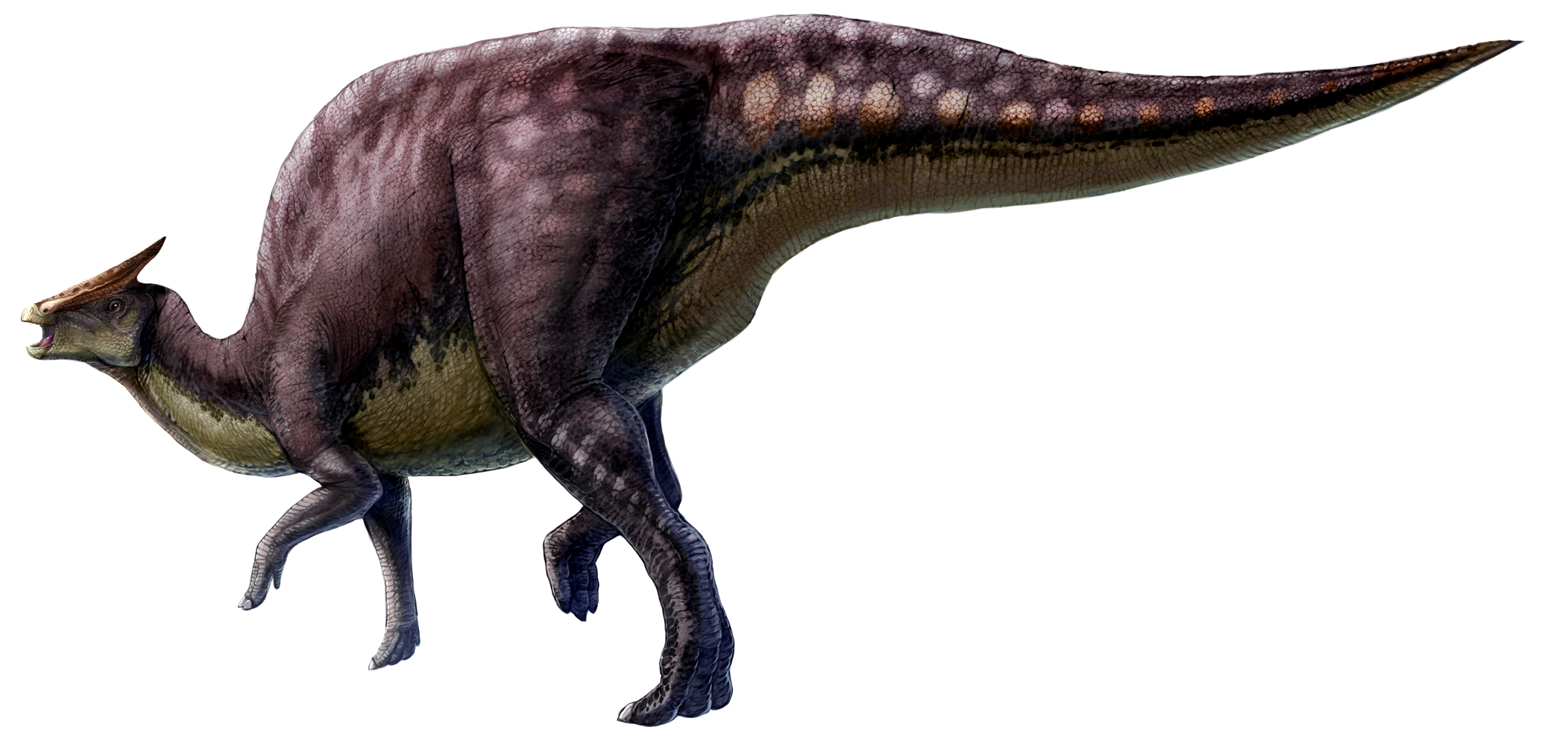
Saurolophus.

The extreme changes occurring in the make-up of herbivore communities during the faunal turnover suggests that a change in the ecosystems' flora was "the most immediate cause...though perhaps not the ultimate one." The rapid expansion of land and drying of inland climate accompanying a drop in sea level could explain some of the environmental changes occurring Late Cretaceous western North America. The wetland habitat enjoyed by many dinosaurs would have shrunk and fragmented. Since many species had very limited geographic ranges its plausible that some of the fragments would be smaller than the area needed to support the species. However, there's no direct evidence for the shrinking of wetland environments. Lehman contends that the actual area of coastal lowlands within 150m of the shoreline must have actually increased significantly. Further, dinosaurs that inhabited inland or arid environments were among the most prevalent in the Lancian. The Alamosaurus-Quetzalcoatlus association probably represents semi-arid inland plains. In previous research Jack Horner speculated that a rise in sea level during the Bearpaw Transgression created selective pressure as coastal lowlands were swallowed up the sea, resulting in anagenesis. If the geographic range of some dinosaur species were truly as limited as the fossil record suggests, then a rapid rise in sea level could cause intense pressure even if the event was local. Additionally, a rapid drop in sea level could allow for "rapid colonization by a few dinosaur generalists."

The appearance or reappearance of basal neoceratopsians could be explained by immigration from Asia. Dinosaurs like Nodocephalosaurus resembled Asian forms, and some like Saurolophus co-occurred in Asia as well as North America. Potential Asian immigrants were especially common in upland environments. The appearance of Alamosaurus may have represented an immigration event from South America. Some taxa may have co-occurred on both continents, including Kritosaurus and Avisaurus. Alamosaurus appears and achieves dominance in its environment very abruptly. Some scientists speculated that Alamosaurus was an immigrant from Asia. Inhabitants of upland environment are more likely to be endemic than coastal species, and tend to have less of an ability to cross bodies of water. Further, early Cretaceous titanosaurs were already known, so North American potential ancestors for Alamosaurus already existed. Quetzalcoatlus also had precursors in North America and its apparent range expansion may represent the expansion of its preferred habitat rather than an immigration event. Early Cretaceous deposits in North America reveal that basal neoceratopsians were already present on the continent before their apparent reemergence in the Lancian, so an immigration event from Asia is unnecessary to explain their appearance. The major potential immigrants represent archaic forms that probably wouldn't have directly competed with the disappearing forms anyway. Lehman described the evidence for immigration as a driving force in Lancian dinosaur faunal turnovers as "not particularly compelling."

The faunal turnover may be explained by the descent of more primitive forms existing in upland refugia characterized by conifer-dominated flora into areas that were formerly coastal lowlands as the seas retreated and conditions became more arid.

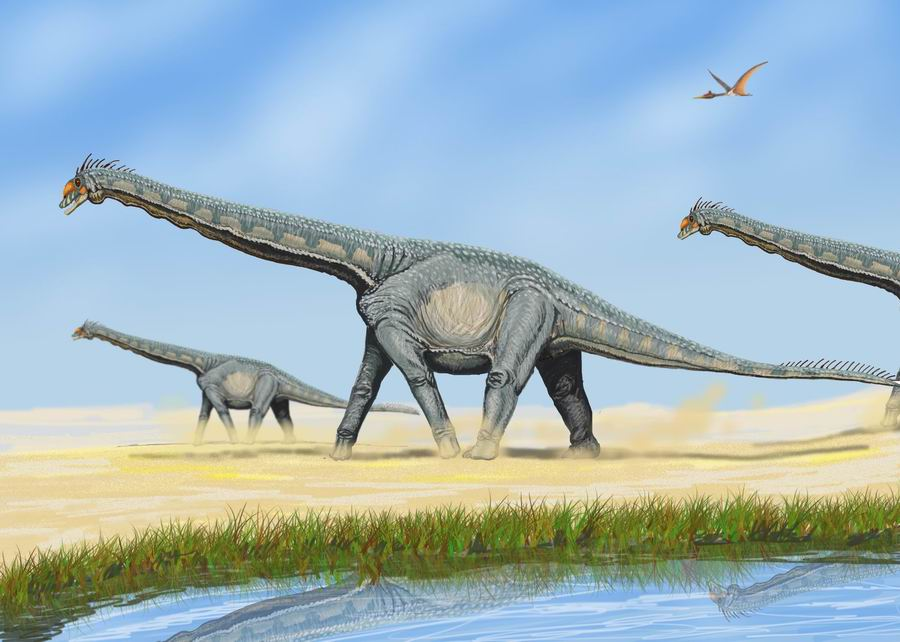
Alamosaurus.

The decline of mammal diversity in Western North America from the Miocene to the present primarily affected large herbivores and occurred over roughly the same length of time as the Late Cretaceous changes, and so may be parallel. They have many commonalities, including the replacement of diverse with single species environments (caribou in the north, bison to the south). The most spectacular and specialized forms became extinct. The mammalian turnover was preceded by an episode of immigration, and was associated with the rapid expansion of terrestrial habitat due to melting glaciers. In the mammalian turnover, the newly emerging dominant fauna were clearly Old World immigrants, the cervids and bovids.

In the southern biome, by Lancian time sauropods had replaced both hadrosaurs and ceratopsians. In the north, both were still present although hadrosaurs were demoted to a "subordinate" role in dinosaur ecosystems. Edmontosaurus was the dominant northern hadrosaurid. At the end of the Cretaceous, most ecosystems were dominated by a single herbivore. The northern biome was dominated by Triceratops and the southern biome by Alamosaurus. This faunal turnover coincides with the Laramide orogeny and the uplift of the central Rockies. Strata exhibit changes in lithology and the direction of paleocurrents, and a severe drop in relative sea level. At the very least, Lehman argues, the altitudinal life zones would shift, and a change in the distribution of vegetation utilized by herbivorous dinosaurs would have probably resulted. By the end of the Judithian, North America had 7.7 million km^{2} of land area, but by the end of the Lancian it had reached 17.9 million km^{2}, nearly the modern value of 22.5 million km^{2}.
