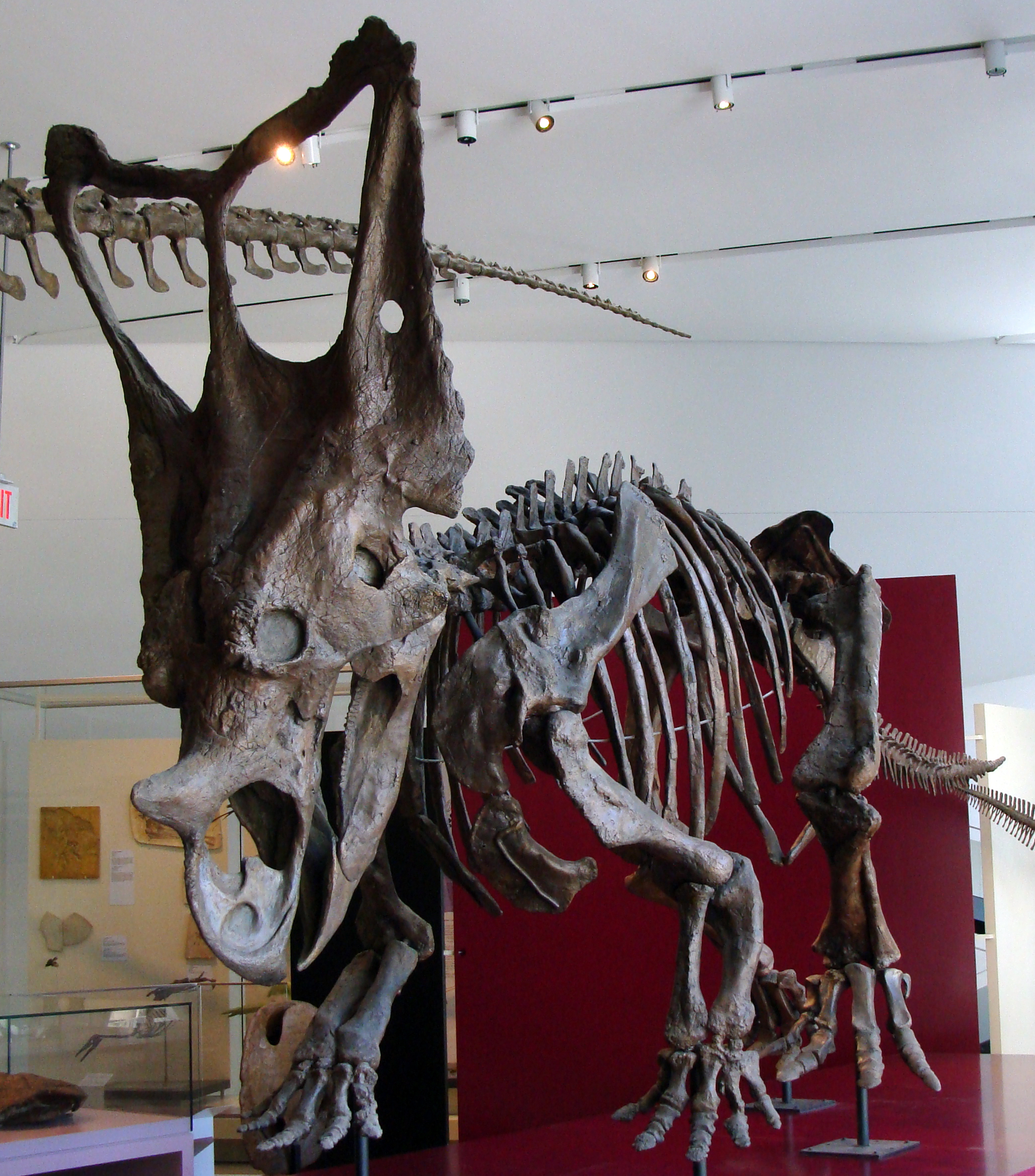
- C. belli skeleton, Royal Ontario Museum specimen 843

Scientific classification
- Kingdom: Animalia
- Phylum: Chordata
- Class: Reptilia
- Clade: Dinosauria
- Clade: †Ornithischia
- Clade: †Ceratopsia
- Family: †Ceratopsidae
- Subfamily: †Chasmosaurinae
- Genus: †Chasmosaurus; Lambe, 1914

Type species
- †Chasmosaurus belli Lambe, 1902

Species
- †C. belli (Lambe, 1902); †C. irvinensis? Holmes et al., 2001

Synonyms
- Eoceratops Lambe, 1915; Mojoceratops Longrich, 2010; Vagaceratops? Sampson et al., 2010

= Chasmosaurus =

Chasmosaurus Temporal range: Late Cretaceous (Campanian), 77–74 Ma

Extinct genus of dinosaurs

Chasmosaurus (/ˌkæzmoʊˈsɔːrəs/ KAZ-moh-SOR-əs) is a genus of ceratopsid dinosaur from the Late Cretaceous Period in North America. Its given name means 'opening lizard', referring to the large openings (fenestrae) in its frill (Greek chasma, meaning 'opening', 'hollow', or 'gulf'; and sauros, meaning 'lizard'). With a length of 4.3–4.8 metres (14.1–15.7 ft) and a weight of 1.5–2 tonnes (1.7–2.2 short tons)—or anywhere from 2,200 to nearly 5,000 lbs—Chasmosaurus was of a slightly smaller to "average" size, especially when compared to larger ceratopsids (such as Triceratops, which were about the size of an African bush elephant).

It was initially to be called Protorosaurus, but this name had been previously published for another animal. All of the excavated specimens of Chasmosaurus were collected at the Dinosaur Park Formation, Dinosaur Provincial Park, Alberta, Canada. For many years, Chasmosaurus russelli was considered a second species. However, in 2026 its type specimen was given the separate genus Cryptarcus, with other prior "C. russelli" specimens being of uncertain taxonomy.

== Discovery and species ==
=== Chasmosaurus belli ===
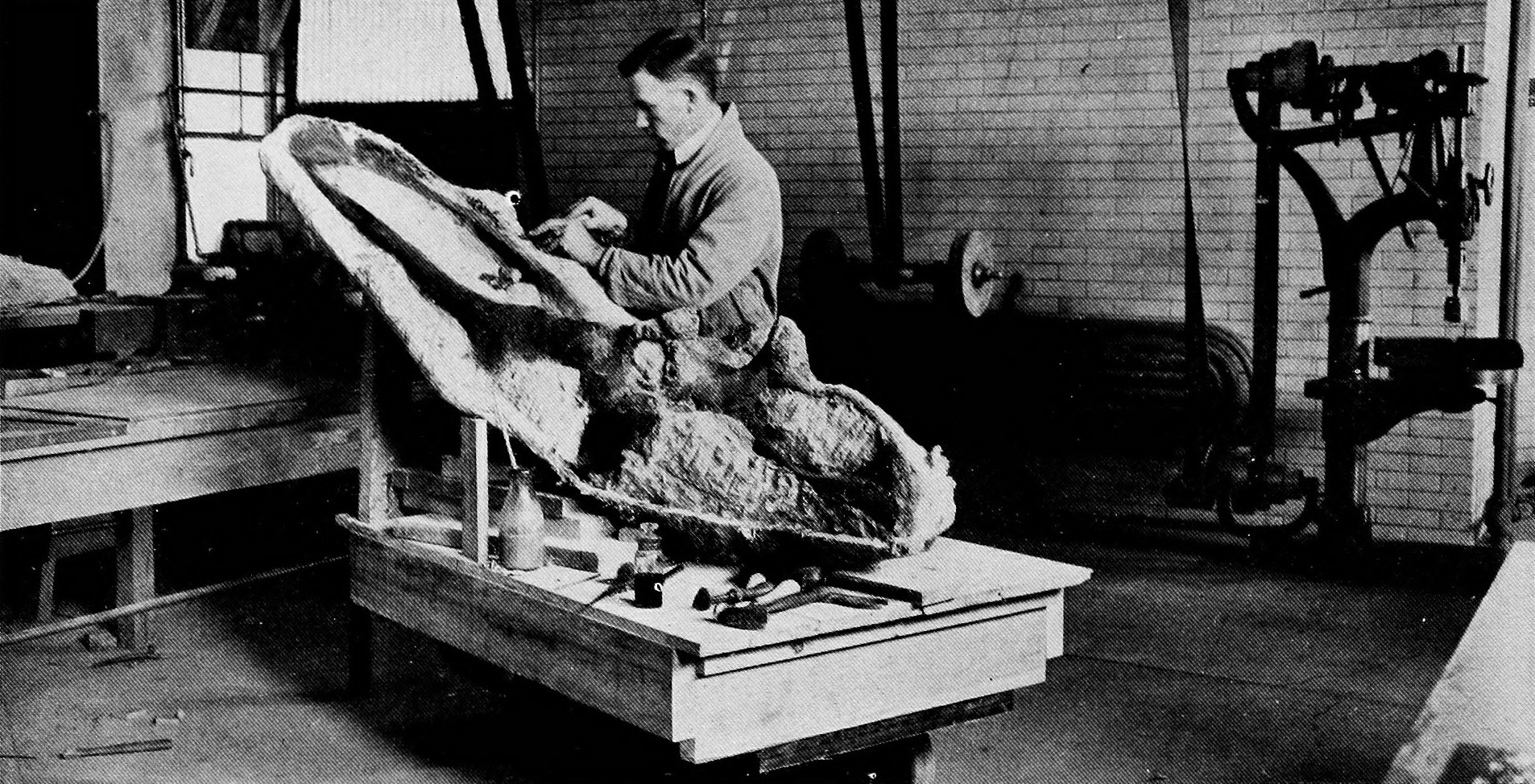
George F. Sternberg preparing a C. belli skull in 1914

In 1898, at Berry Creek, Alberta, Lawrence Morris Lambe of the Geological Survey of Canada made the first discovery of Chasmosaurus remains; holotype NMC 491, a parietal bone that was part of a neck frill. Although recognizing that his find represented a new species, Lambe thought this could be placed in a previously known short-frilled ceratopsian genus: Monoclonius. He erected the new species Monoclonius belli to describe his findings. The specific name honoured collector Walter Bell.

However, in 1913, Charles Hazelius Sternberg and his sons found several complete "M. belli" skulls in the middle Dinosaur Park Formation of Alberta, Canada. Based on these finds, Lambe (1914) erected Protorosaurus ("before Torosaurus"), but that name was preoccupied by the Permian reptile Protorosaurus, so he subsequently created the replacement name Chasmosaurus in February 1914. The name Chasmosaurus is derived from Greek χάσμα, khasma, "opening" or "divide" and refers to the very large parietal fenestrae in the skull frill. Lambe now also assigned a paratype, specimen NMC 2245 found by the Sternbergs in 1913 and consisting of a largely complete skeleton, including skin impressions. Apart from the holotype and paratype several additional specimens of C. belli are known. These include AMNH 5422, ROM 843 (earlier ROM 5499) and NHMUK R4948, all (partial) skeletons with skull.

=== Putative additional species ===
Since that date, more remains, including skulls, have been found that have been referred to Chasmosaurus, and several additional species have been named within the genus. Today several of these are considered to only reflect a morphological variation among the known sample of Chasmosaurus belli skulls.

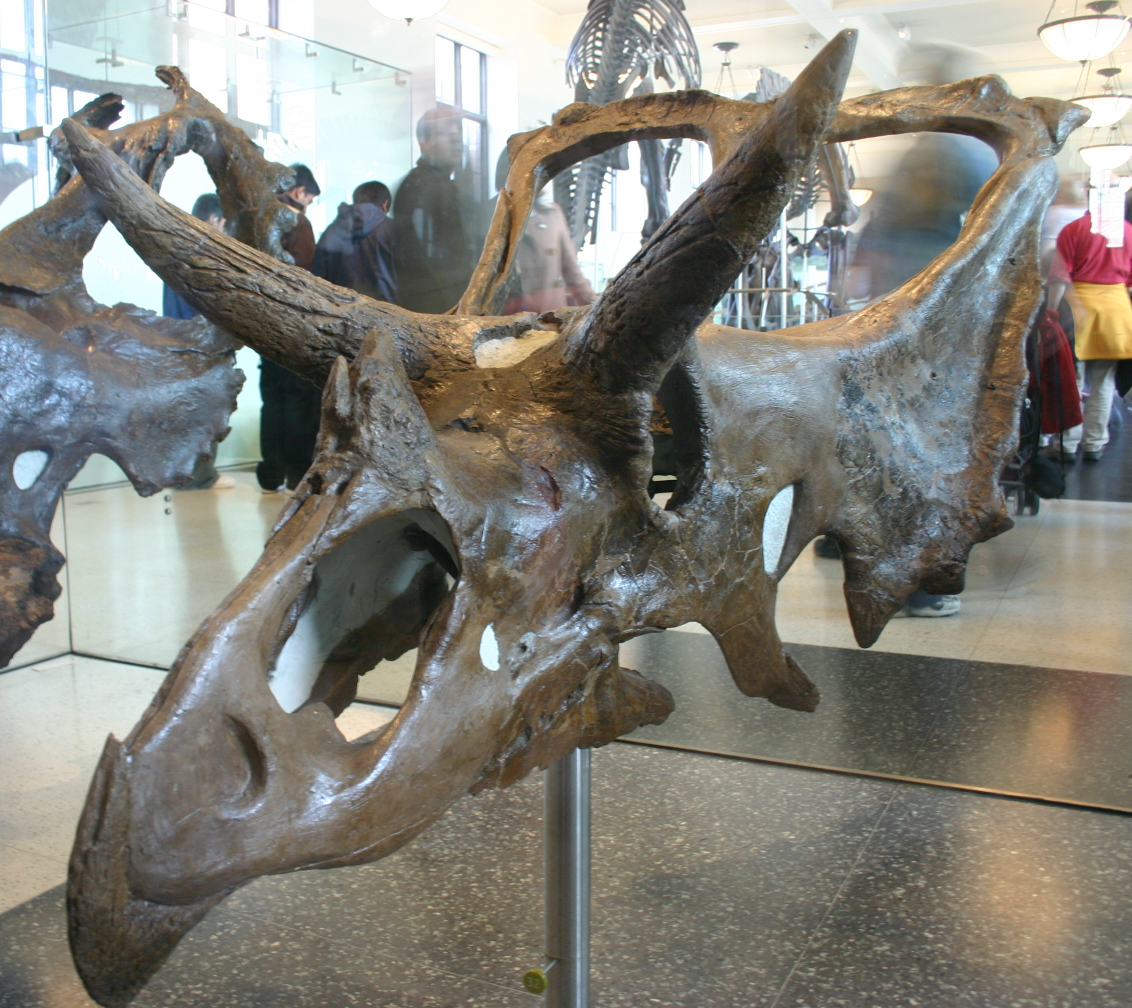
Holotype of C. kaiseni

In addition to Monoclonius belli, later Chasmosaurus, Lambe's 1902 study named Monoclonius canadensis. This species would later be given the distinct genus Eoceratops by Lambe in 1915. In 1990, Thomas Lehmen would refer to this the genus Chasmosaurus, forming the binomial Chasmosaurus canadensis. It was supposedly distinguished by its longer postorbital horns than other species Similarly, in 1933 Barnum Brown named Chasmosaurus kaiseni, honouring Peter Kaisen and based on skull AMNH 5401, also distinguished by its very long brow horns. A 2016 analysis of Chasmosaurus specimens by James Campbell and colleagues found that postorbital horn size was too variable to be considered a distinguishing trait, and due to lacking the back of the parietal bone (forming the back of the frill), both species were considered indeterminate beyond the genus Chasmosaurus.

Richard Swann Lull named an unusual, short-muzzled skull, specimen ROM 839 (earlier ROM 5436) collected in 1926, as Chasmosaurus brevirostris in 1933, with the name referring to its short snout. This was seen as a junior synonym of C. belli by Lehman, whereas Campbell and colleagues considered it an indeterminate specimen only referrable to the genus Chasmosaurus.

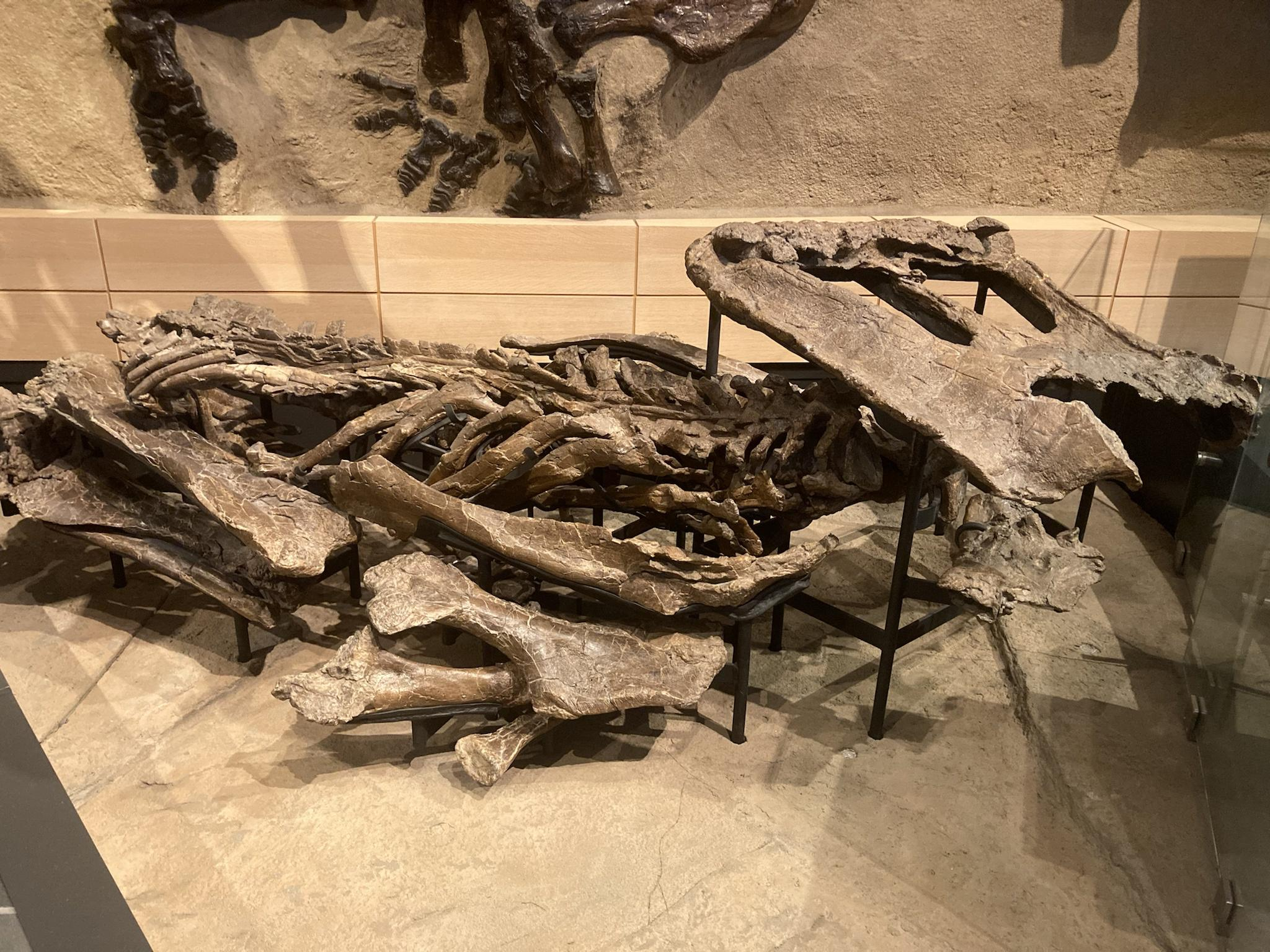
Holotype of C. irvinensis at Canadian Museum of Nature

The species Chasmosaurus irvinensis was named in 2001, stemming from the uppermost beds of the Dinosaur Park Formation. It is distinguished by its unembayed parietal bar and the downwardly curled ornamentation along the back of its frill. This species was given its own genus, Vagaceratops, in 2010. However, a 2019 study by Campbell and colleagues returned Vagaceratops back to Chasmosaurus due to observing that some putative specimens of C. belli show transitional anatomy towards that of C. irvinesis. These transitional specimens were removed from C. belli, and merely considered indeterminate Chasmosaurus. These include the specimens YPM 2016 and AMNH 5402. A 2020 study by Denver Fowler and Elizabeth Freedman Fowler agreed with the evolutionary link between Chasmosaurus and Vagaceratops, but considered the latter an even closer relative and possible ancestor of Kosmoceratops. Consequently, they suggested it should be maintained as a distinct genus from Chasmosaurus, as its placement would probably remain unstable until chasmosaurine relationships are better understood. They also noted that CMN 2245, another former C. belli specimen, represents an additional seemingly transitional specimen between C. belli and Vagaceratops.

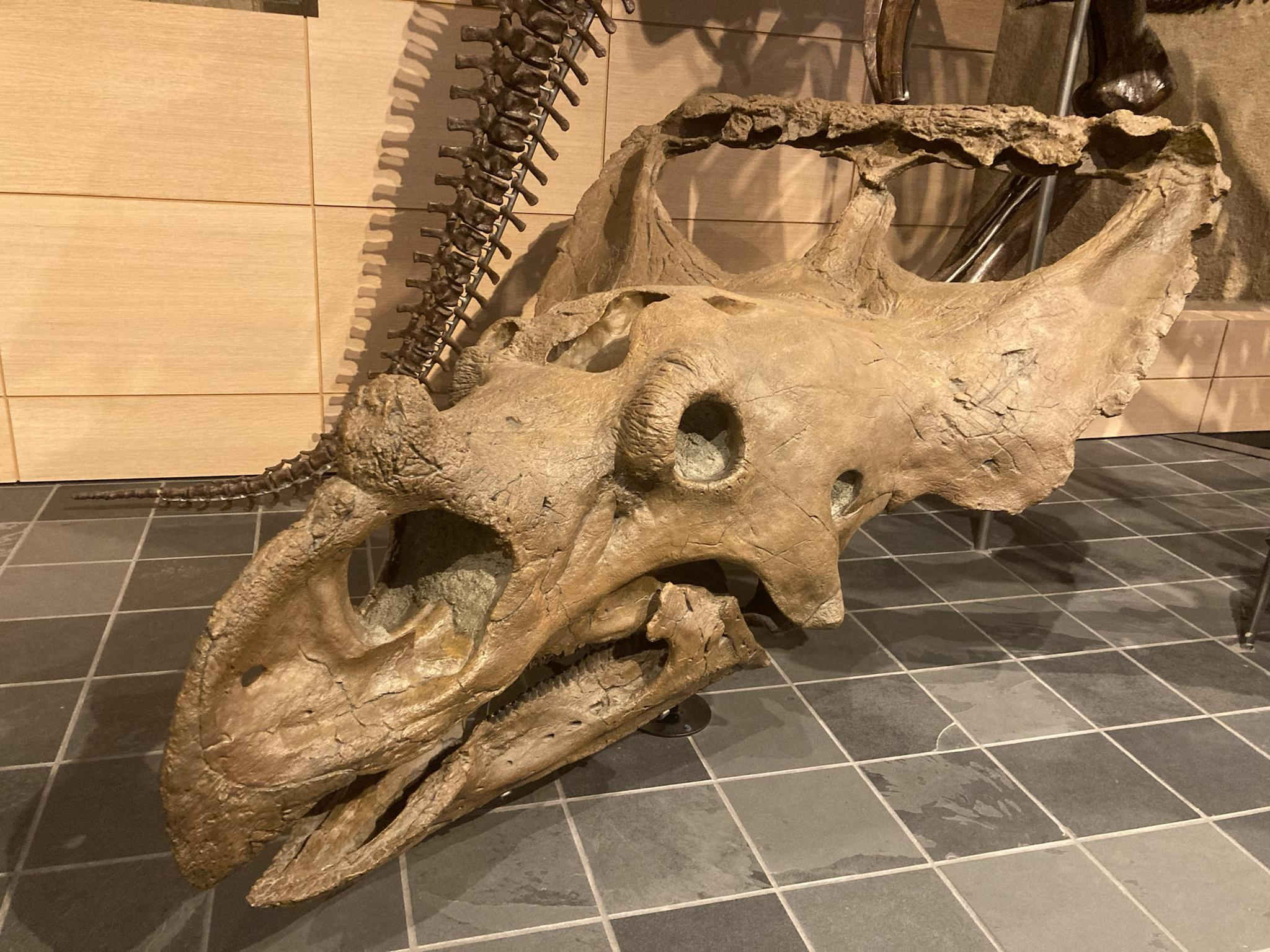
Skull replica of Chasmosaurus irvinensis, sometimes considered its own genus Vagaceratops

In 2010, Nicholas Longrich named the new genus and species Mojoceratops perifania based on fossils previously considered to belong to Chasmosaurus. The species Mojoceratops perifania was based on holotype specimen TMP 1983.25.1 consisting of a partial skull including the parietal and from the paratypes TMP 1999.55.292, an isolated lateral ramus of a right parietal, and NMC 8803, central bar and lateral rami of parietals. Specimens AMNH 5656, NMC 34832 and TMP 1979.11.147, and (tentatively) AMNH 5401 and NMC 1254 were also referred to the genus. All specimens assigned to Mojoceratops were collected from the Dinosaur Park Formation (late Campanian, 76.5–75 ma) of the Belly River Group of Alberta and Saskatchewan, western Canada. The generic name is derived from mojo and the specific name means "conspicuous pride" in Greek, both referring to the skull frill. Longrich noted that both C. canadensis and C. kaiseni seemed likely represent specimens of Mojoceratops, but considered definitive assignment impossible due to the poor preservation of the C. canadensis holotype and lack of the parietal bar in C. kaiseni.

Following the original assignment of the holotype and other skulls to Mojoceratops, several teams of researchers published work questioning the validity of this new genus. In 2011, Maidment & Barrett failed to confirm the presence of any supposedly unique features, and argued that Mojoceratops perifania was a synonym of Chasmosaurus russelli. Campbell and colleagues, in their 2016 analysis of Chasmosaurus specimens, agreed and added that some supposedly unique features, such as grooves on the parietal bone, were actually also present in the holotype of C. russelli and, to various degrees, in other Chasmosaurus specimens. This variability, they argued, strongly suggested that Mojoceratops was simply a mature growth stage of C. russelli. Recently, the referral of Eoceratops, C. kaiseni, and Mojoceratops to C. russelli was considered doubtful as the holotype of C. russelli is actually from the upper Dinosaur Park Formation, according to recent fieldwork.

=== Former species ===
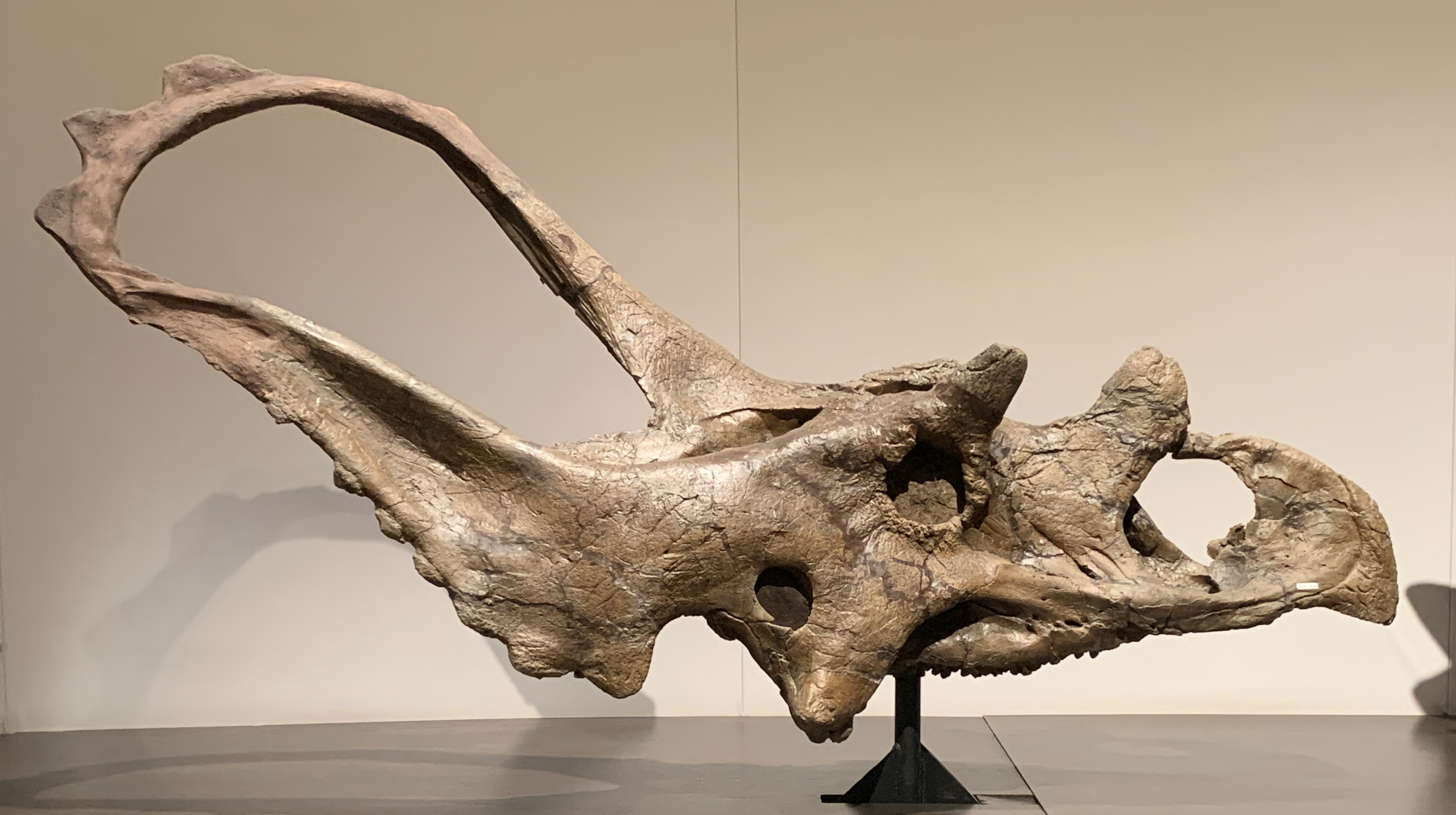
Skull historically referred to "C. russelli" (TMP 1981.019.0175) at the Royal Tyrrell Museum of Palaeontology

Charles Mortram Sternberg added Chasmosaurus russelli in 1940, based on specimen NMC 8800 from southwestern Alberta (lower Dinosaur Park Formation). The specific name honours Loris Shano Russell. Many specimens, primarily from the lower sections of the Dinosaur Park Formation, were referred to C. russelli over time, with the species considered distinguishable from C. belli by the deeper median embayment of its parietal. However, it was later noted C. russelli holotype had unusual characters more reminiscent of ceratopsids such as Utahceratops, indicating it may be unrelated to the rest of the species. Further study of the specimen published in 2026 supported this, and it was moved to the distinct genus Cryptarcus. Other former specimens of "russelli" remain of uncertain classification pending further study.

Thomas Lehman described Chasmosaurus mariscalensis in 1989 from Texas, which has now been renamed Agujaceratops.

In 1987, Gregory S. Paul renamed Pentaceratops sternbergii into Chasmosaurus sternbergi, but this has found no acceptance. In 2000, George Olshevsky renamed Monoclonius recurvicornis Cope 1889 into Chasmosaurus recurvicornis as its fossil material is likely chasmosaurine; this species is currently considered to be taxonomically invalid.

== Description ==
Size comparison of several members of Ceratopsidae with a human, Chasmosaurus in green

Chasmosaurus was a medium-size ceratopsid. In 2010 G.S. Paul estimated the length of C. belli at 4.8 metres, its weight at two tonnes.

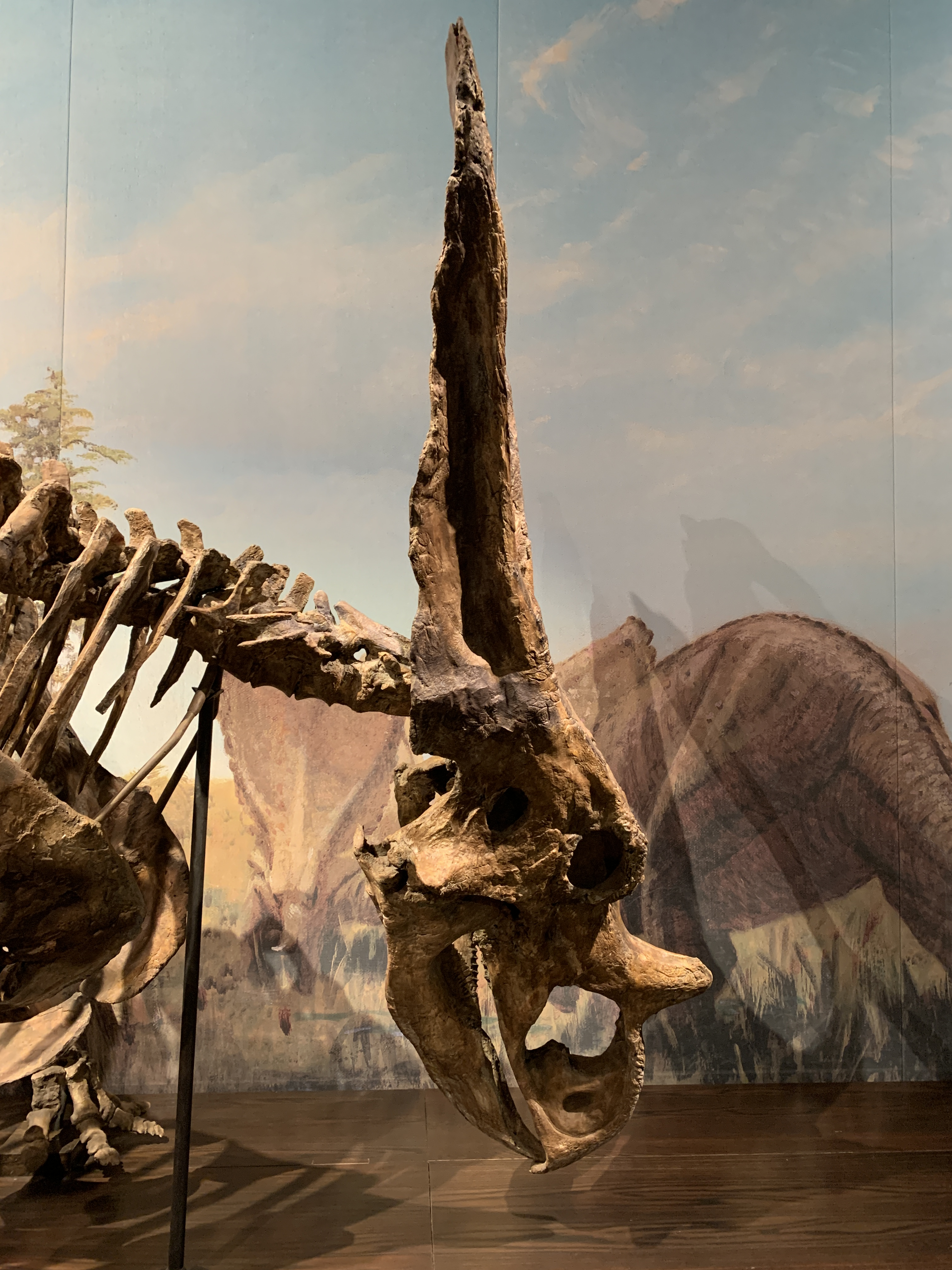
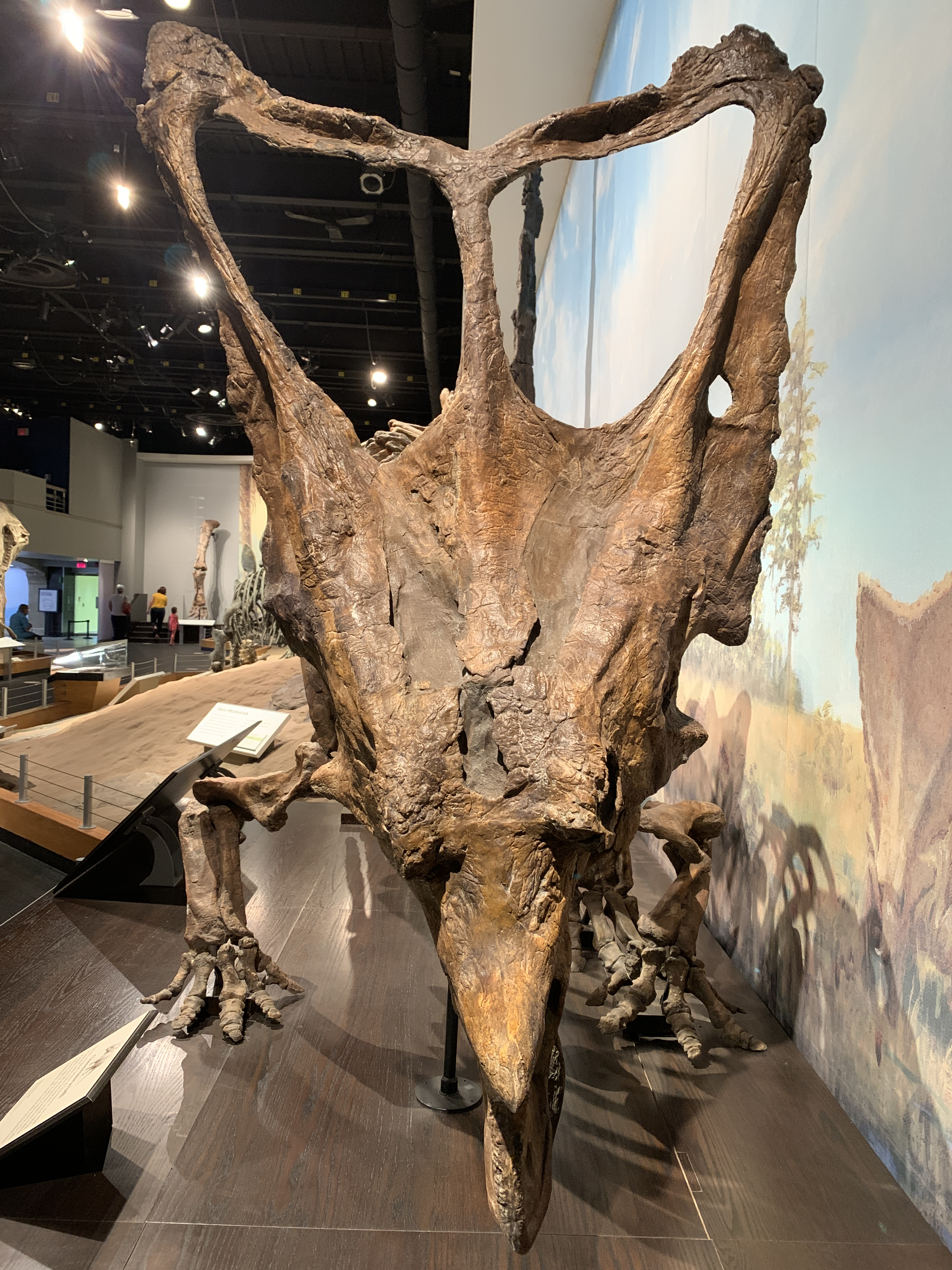
Side and front view of the skull of Chasmosaurus belli, at the Royal Tyrell Museum

Differences between the horns and frills of various specimens have been noted, though their taxonomy is unresolved. Like many ceratopsians, Chasmosaurus had three main facial horns - one on the nose and two on the brow. These are generally short or nearly absent entirely, but in some specimens are noticeably longer. The frill of Chasmosaurus is very elongated and broader at the rear than at the front. It is hardly elevated from the plane of the snout. The rear of the frill is V-shaped and its sides are straight. How deep the V-shaped embayment is varies, and may distinguish species. In some Chasmosaurus there is no embayment at all, whereas in others it is considerably deep. The sides were adorned by six to ten ornamental bumps known as epioccipitals, which attached to the squamosal bone. Three further epioccipitals adorned the back of the frill, formed by the parietal bones. The frill, formed in the center by the parietals, was pierced by two very large openings, after which the genus was named: the parietal fenestrae. These were not oval in shape, as with most relatives, but triangular, with one point orientated towards the frill corner.

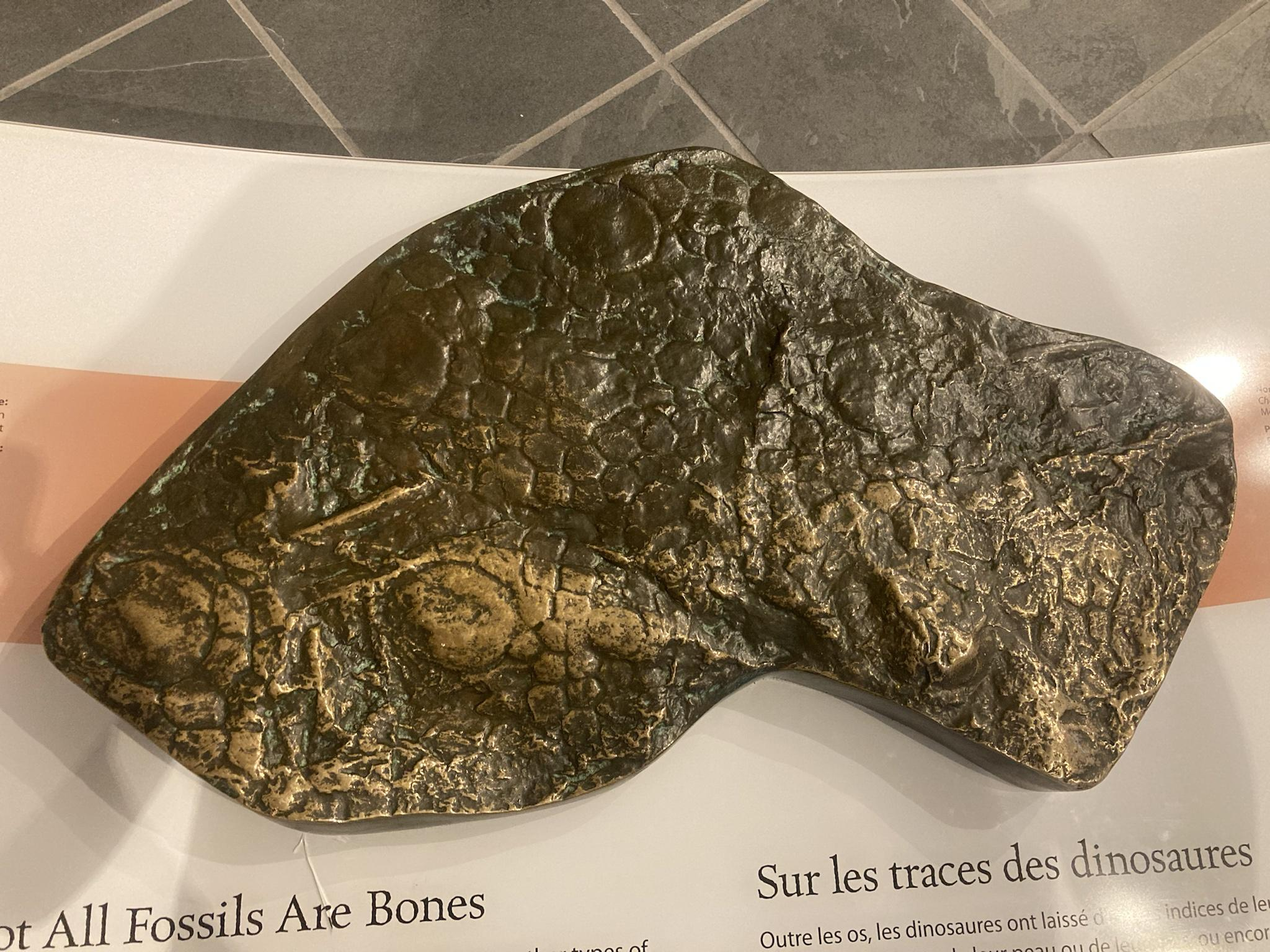
Replica of skin impressions

The postcranium of C. belli is best preserved in the specimen known as NHMUK 4948. The first three cervical vertebrae are fused into a unit known as a syncervical, as in other neoceratopsians. There are five other cervicals preserved in this specimen, for a total of eight, which likely represents a complete neck. Cervicals four to eight are amphiplatian, wider than long, and roughly equal in length. The dorsal vertebrae are also amphiplatian. C. belli possessed a synsacrum, a compound unit composed of sacral, dorsal, and sometimes caudal vertebrae, depending on the specimen.

The Chasmosaurus specimen NMC 2245 recovered by C.M. Sternberg was accompanied by skin impressions. The area conserved, from the right hip region, measured about one by 0.5 metres. The skin appears to have had large scales in evenly spaced horizontal rows among smaller scales. The larger scales had a diameter of up to fifty-five millimetres and were distanced from each other by five to ten centimetres. They were hexagonal or pentagonal, thus with five or six sides. Each of these sides touched somewhat smaller scales, forming a rosette. Small, non-overlapping convex scales of about one centimetre in diameter surrounded the whole. The larger scales were wrinkled due to straight grooves orientated perpendicular to their edges. From top to bottom, the large scale rows gradually declined in size. Unfortunately, nothing can as yet be learned about the coloration of Chasmosaurus from the known fossil skin impression samples.

== Classification ==
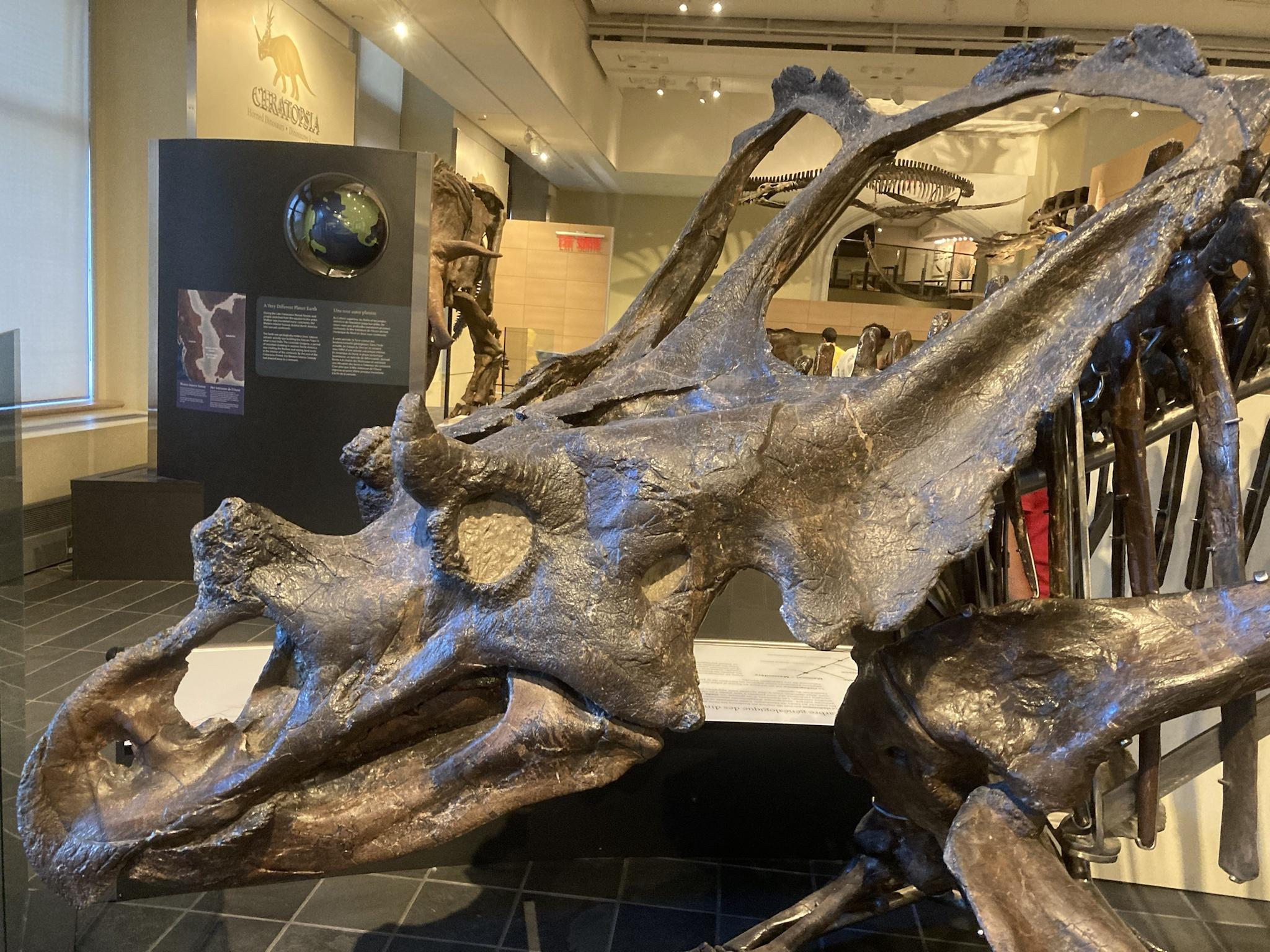
Skull of Chasmosaurus belli, Canadian Museum of Nature

Chasmosaurus was in 1915 by Lambe within the Ceratopsia assigned to the Chasmosaurinae. The Chasmosaurinae usually have long frills, like Chasmosaurus itself, whereas their sister-group the Centrosaurinae typically have shorter frills. Most cladistic analyses show that Chasmosaurus has a basal position in the Chasmosaurinae.

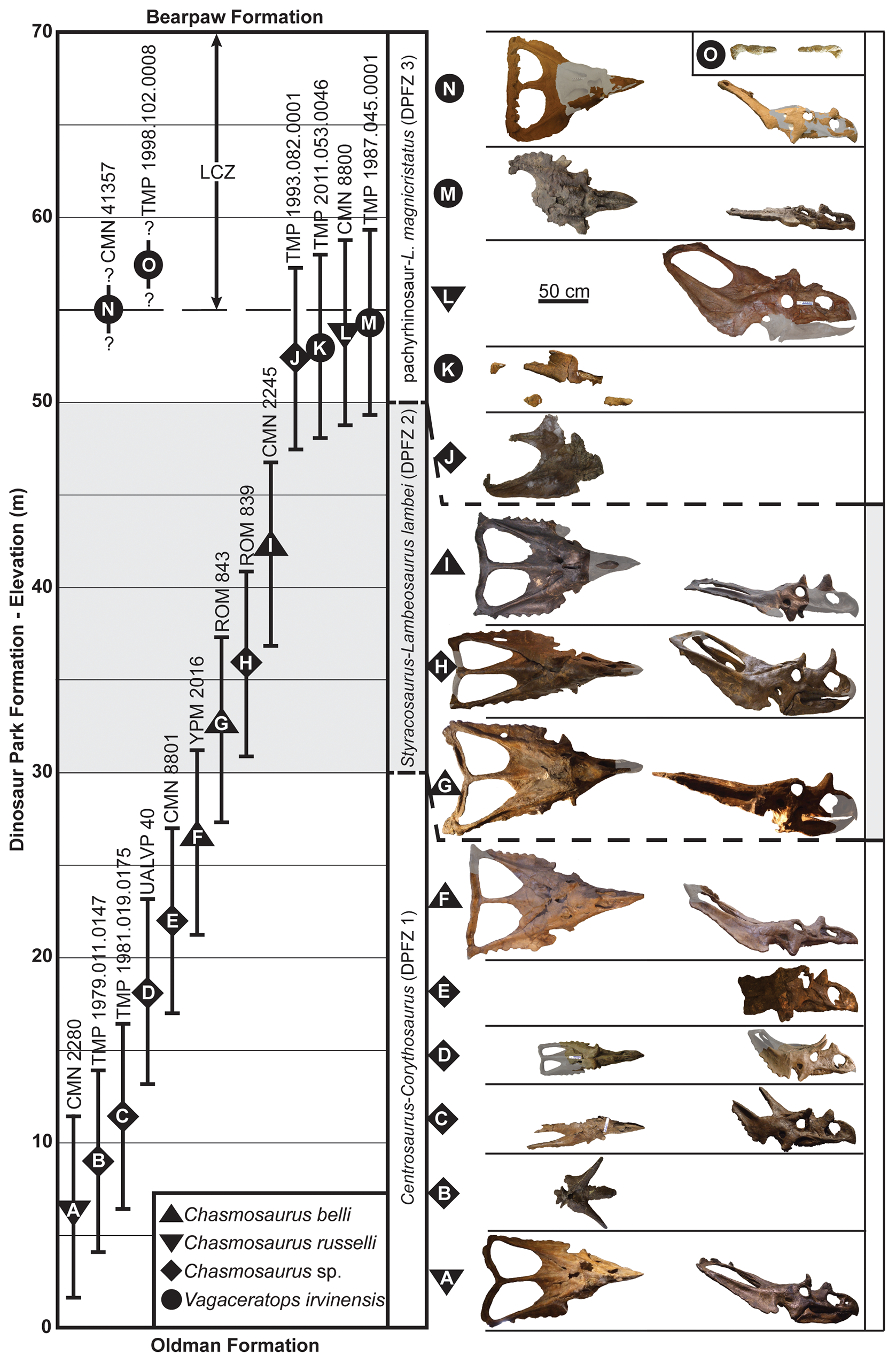
Stratigraphic positions of chasmosaurine specimens from the Dinosaur Park Formation prior to reclassification of "C. russelli" as Cryptarcus

The following cladogram shows the phylogeny of Chasmosaurus according to a study by Scott Sampson e.a. in 2010.

- Ceratopsidae
  - Centrosaurinae
  - Chasmosaurinae
    - Chasmosaurus
    - - Mojoceratops
      - - Agujaceratops
        - - - Utahceratops
            - Pentaceratops
          - - Coahuilaceratops
            - - - Kosmoceratops
                - Vagaceratops
              - - Anchiceratops
                - - Arrhinoceratops
                  - - Ojoceratops
                    - Eotriceratops
                    - - Torosaurus
                      - - Nedoceratops
                        - Triceratops

== Paleobiology ==
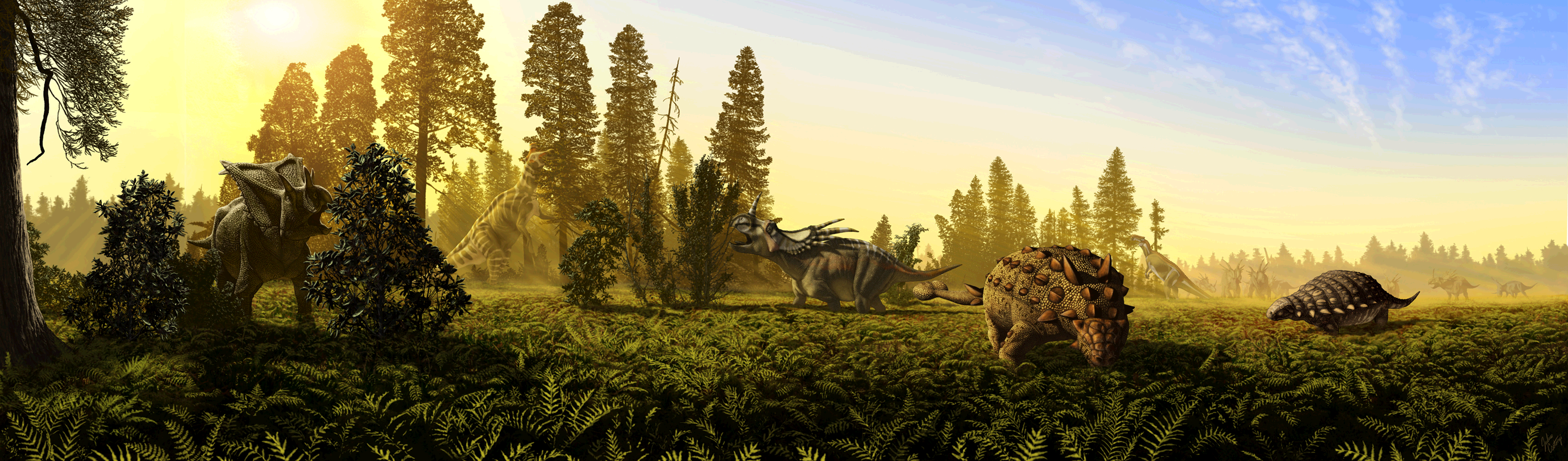
Depiction of the mega-herbivores in the Dinosaur Park Formation, C. belli on the left

Chasmosaurus shared its habitat, the east coast of Laramidia, with successive species of Centrosaurus. A certain niche partitioning is suggested by the fact that Chasmosaurus had a longer snout and jaws and might have been more selective about the plants it ate.

The function of the frill and horns is problematic. The horns are rather short and the frill had such large fenestrae that it could not have offered much functional defense. Paul suggested that the beak was the main defensive weapon. It is possible that the frill was simply used to appear imposing or conceivably for thermoregulation. The frill may also have been brightly colored, to draw attention to its size or as part of a mating display. However, it is difficult to prove any sexual dimorphism. In 1933, Lull suggested that C. kaiseni, which bore long brow horns, was in fact the male of C. belli of which the females would have short ones. In 1927 C.M. Sternberg concluded that of the two skeletons he had mounted in the Canadian Museum of Nature, the smaller one, NMC 2245, was the male and the larger, NMC 2280, the female. However, today the two are referred to different species.

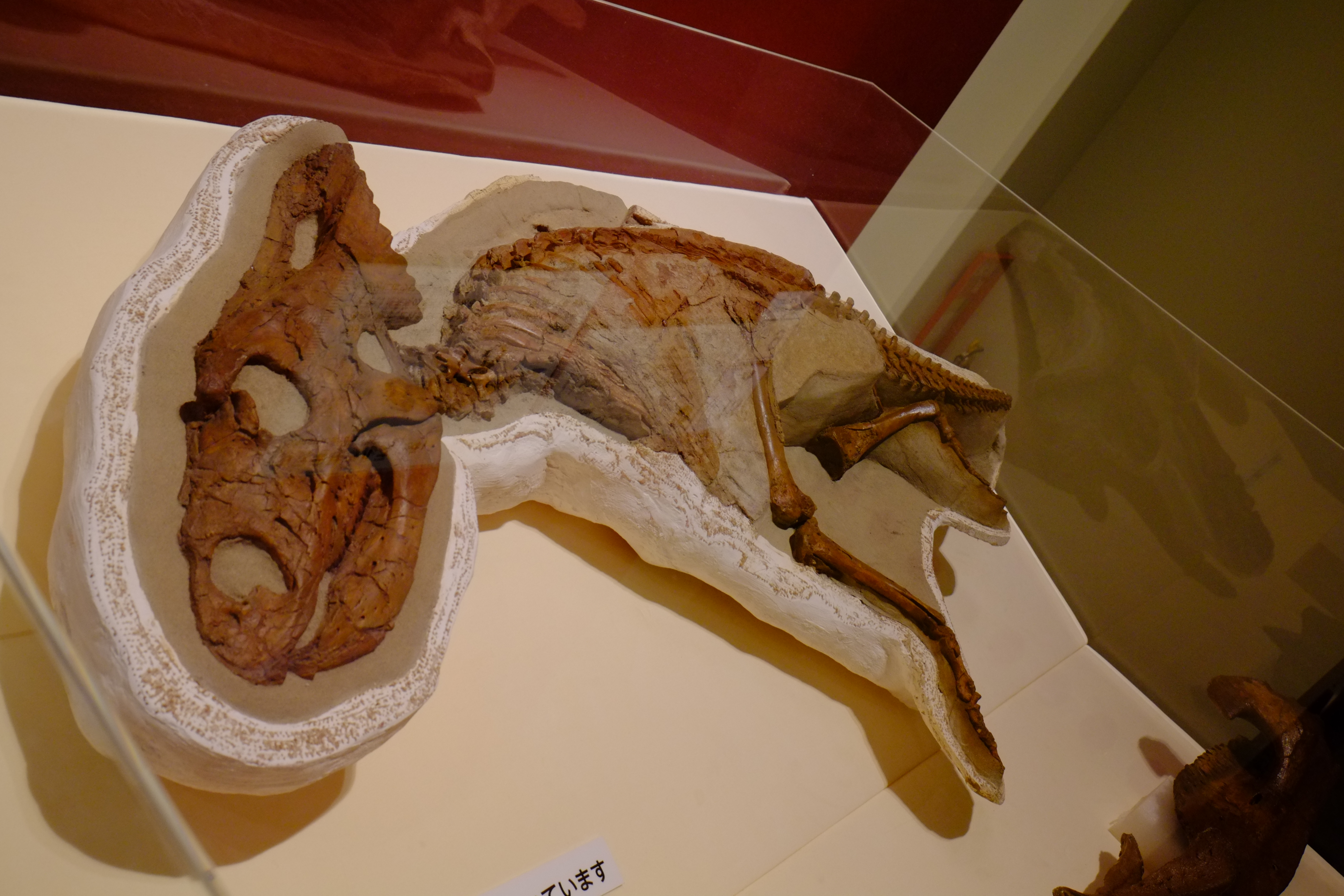
Juvenile UALVP 52613

A juvenile Chasmosaurus belli found in Alberta, Canada by Phil Currie et al., reveals that Chasmosaurus may have cared for its young, like its relative, Triceratops, is hypothesized to have done. The juvenile measured five feet long and was estimated to be three years of age and had similar limb proportions to the adult Chasmosaurus. This indicates that Chasmosaurus was not fast moving, and that juveniles did not need to be fast moving either to keep pace with adults. The fossil was complete save for its missing front limbs, which had fallen into a sinkhole before the specimen was uncovered. Skin impressions were also uncovered beneath the skeleton and evidence from the matrix that it was buried in indicated that the juvenile ceratopsian drowned during a possible river crossing. Further study of the specimen revealed that juvenile chasmosaurs had a frill that was narrower in the back than that of adults, as well as being proportionately shorter in relation to the skull.

== See also ==
- Timeline of ceratopsian research
