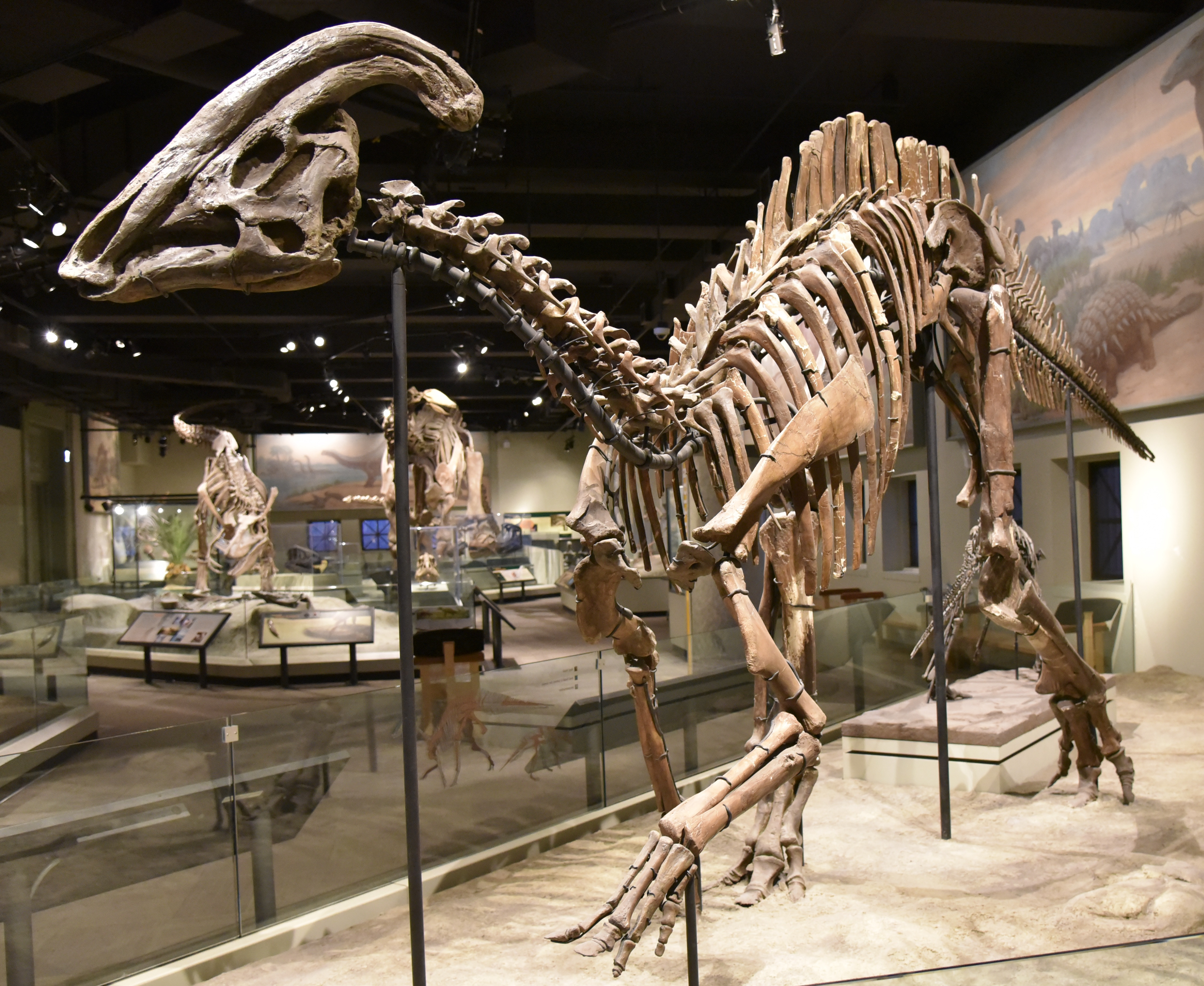
- P. cyrtocristatus skeletal mount at the Field Museum of Natural History.

Scientific classification
- Kingdom: Animalia
- Phylum: Chordata
- Class: Reptilia
- Clade: Dinosauria
- Clade: †Ornithischia
- Clade: †Ornithopoda
- Family: †Hadrosauridae
- Subfamily: †Lambeosaurinae
- Tribe: †Parasaurolophini
- Genus: †Parasaurolophus; Parks, 1922

Type species
- †Parasaurolophus walkeri Parks, 1922

Other species
- †P. tubicen Wiman, 1931; †P. cyrtocristatus Ostrom, 1961; †P. jiayinensis? (Godefroit, Zan & Jin, 2000) Paul, 2010

Synonyms
- Charonosaurus? Godefroit, Zan & Jin, 2000; Paralophosaurus Martin, 2014 (lapsus calami)

= Parasaurolophus =

Parasaurolophus Temporal range: Late Cretaceous (Campanian), 76.5–73 Ma Possible record during the Maastrichtian

Hadrosaurid ornithopod dinosaur genus from Late Cretaceous Period

Parasaurolophus (/ˌpærəsɔːˈrɒləfəs, -ˌsɔːrəˈloʊfəs/; meaning "beside crested lizard" in reference to Saurolophus) is a genus of hadrosaurid "duck-billed" dinosaur that lived in what is now western North America and possibly Asia during the Late Cretaceous period, about 76.5–73 million years ago. It was a large herbivore that could reach over 9 metres (30 ft) long and weigh over 5 metric tons (5.5 short tons), and were able to move as a biped and a quadruped. Three species are universally recognized: P. walkeri (the type species), P. tubicen, and the short-crested P. cyrtocristatus. Additionally, a fourth species, P. jiayinensis, has been proposed, although it is more commonly placed in the separate genus Charonosaurus. Remains are known from Alberta, New Mexico, and Utah, as well as possibly Heilongjiang if Charonosaurus is in fact part of the genus. The genus was first described in 1922 by William Parks from a skull and partial skeleton found in Alberta.

Parasaurolophus is a hadrosaurid, part of a diverse family of large Late Cretaceous ornithopods that are known for their range of bizarre head adornments, which were likely used for communication and increased hearing. This genus is known for its large, elaborate cranial crest, which forms a long curved tube projecting upwards and back from the skull in its largest form. Charonosaurus from China, which may have been its closest relative, had a similar skull and a potentially similar crest. Visual recognition of both species and sex, acoustic resonance, and thermoregulation have been proposed as functional explanations for the crest. It is one of the rarer hadrosaurids, known from only a handful of good specimens.

== Discovery and naming ==
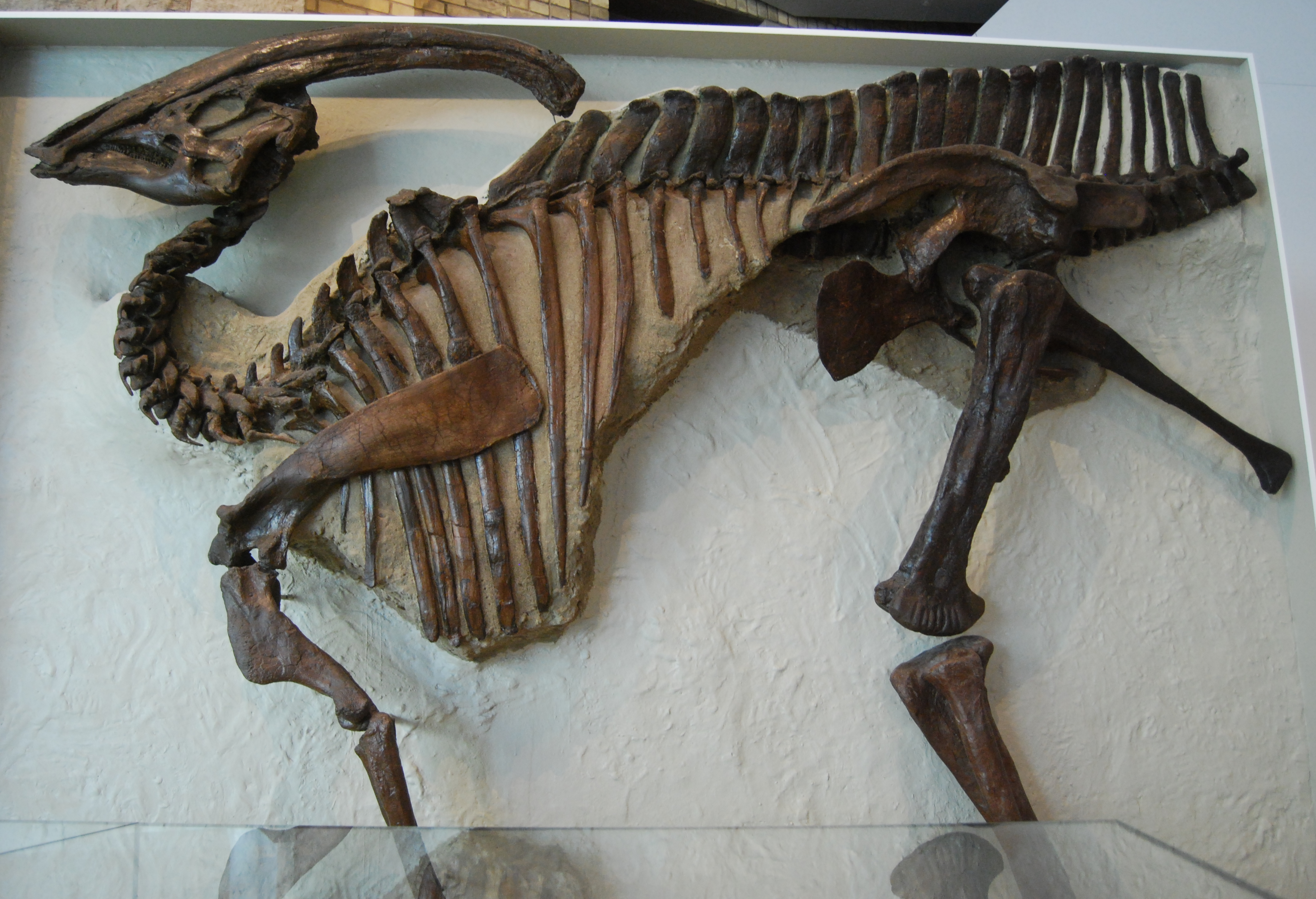
Holotype specimen of P. walkeri, showing the pathologic v-shaped notch

Meaning "near crested lizard", the name Parasaurolophus is derived from the Greek words para/παρα ("beside" or "near"), saurus/σαυρος ("lizard"), and lophos/λοφος ("crest"). It is based on ROM 768, a skull and partial skeleton missing most of the tail and the back legs below the knees, which was found by a field party from the University of Toronto in 1920 near Sand Creek along the Red Deer River in Alberta. These rocks are now known as the Campanian age Late Cretaceous period Dinosaur Park Formation. William Parks named the specimen P. walkeri in honor of Sir Byron Edmund Walker, the chairman of the Board of Trustees of the Royal Ontario Museum. Parasaurolophus remains are rare in Alberta, with only one other partial skull that is possibly from the Dinosaur Park Formation and three Dinosaur Park specimens lacking their skulls that possibly belong to the genus. In some faunal lists, there is a mention of possible P. walkeri material in the Hell Creek Formation of Montana, a rock unit of the late Maastrichtian age. This occurrence is not noted by Sullivan and Williamson in their 1999 review of the genus and has not been further elaborated upon elsewhere.

In 1921, Charles H. Sternberg recovered a partial skull (PMU.R1250) from what is now known as the slightly younger Kirtland Formation in San Juan County, New Mexico. This specimen was sent to Uppsala, where Carl Wiman described it as a second species, P. tubicen, in 1931. The specific epithet is derived from the Latin word tǔbǐcěn, meaning "trumpeter". A second, nearly complete P. tubicen skull (NMMNH P-25100) was found in New Mexico in 1995. Using computed tomography of this skull, Robert Sullivan and Thomas Williamson gave the genus a monographic treatment in 1999 that covered aspects of its anatomy and taxonomy, as well as the functions of its crest. Williamson later published an independent review of the remains that disagreed with the taxonomic conclusions.

John Ostrom described another good specimen (FMNH P27393) from New Mexico as P. cyrtocristatus in 1961. It includes a partial skull with a short, rounded crest and much of the postcranial skeleton except for the feet, neck, and parts of the tail. Its specific name is derived from the Latin words curtus, meaning "shortened" and cristatus, meaning "crested". The specimen was found in either the top of the Fruitland Formation or, more likely, the base of the overlying Kirtland Formation. The range of this species was described in 1979, when David B. Weishampel and James A. Jensen described a partial skull with a similar crest (BYU 2467) from the Campanian age Kaiparowits Formation of Garfield County, Utah. Since then, another skull has been found in Utah with the short, rounded P. cyrtocristatus crest morphology.

=== Species ===
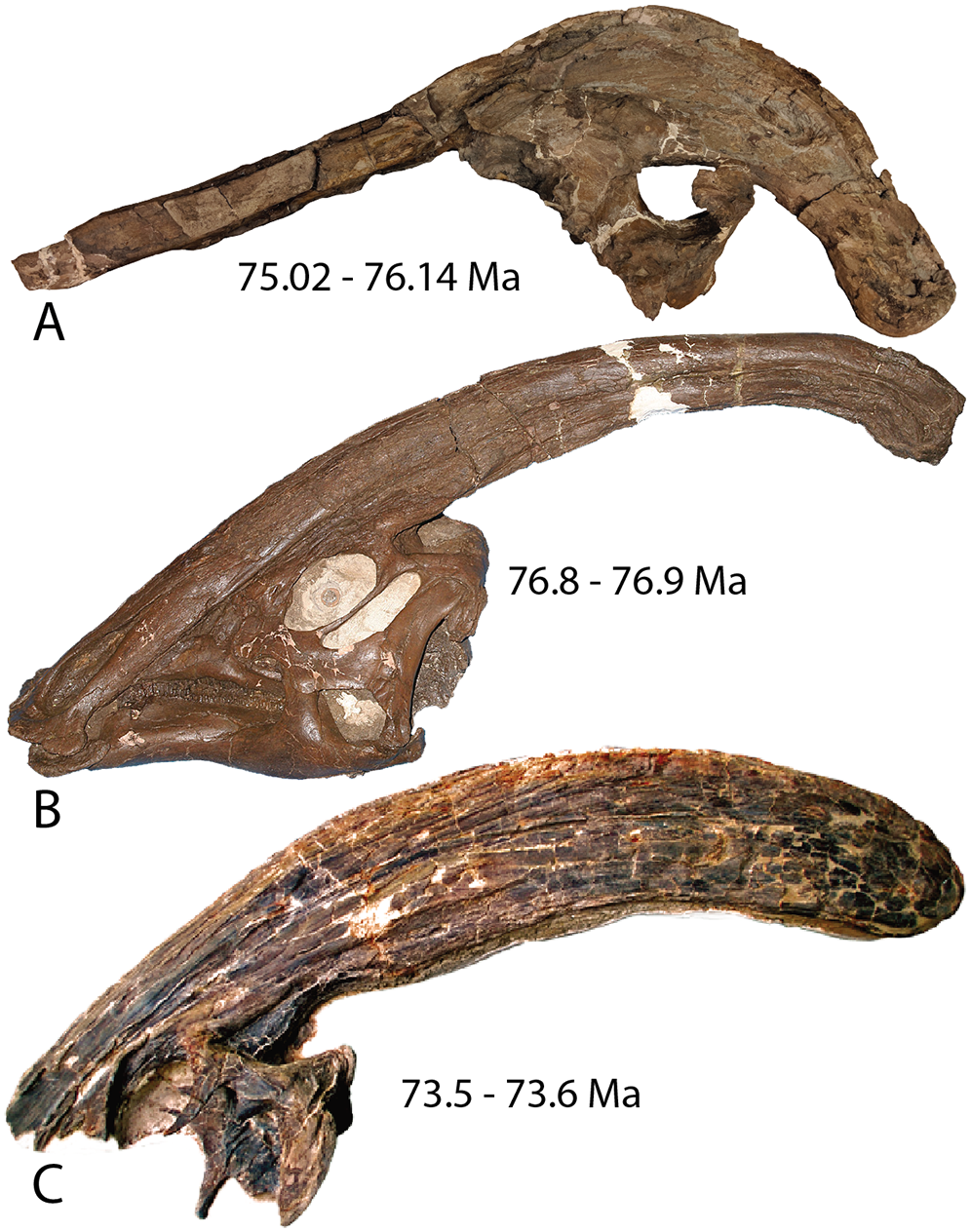
Holotype skulls of the three species arranged by age

Parasaurolophus is known from three certain species: P. walkeri, P. tubicen, and P. cyrtocristatus. All of them can be clearly distinguished from each other and have many differences. The first named species, therefore the type, is P. walkeri. One certain specimen from the Dinosaur Park Formation is referred to it, but many more are almost certainly referable. Like stated above, it is different from the other two species, with it having a simpler internal structure than P. tubicen, along with a straighter crest and different internal structuring than P. cyrtocristatus.

The next named species is P. tubicen, which is the largest of the Parasaurolophus species. It lived in New Mexico, where three specimens are known, and can be differentiated from its other species. It possesses a long and straight crest, with a very complex interior compared to the other species. All known specimens of P. tubicen come from the De-Na-Zin Member of the Kirtland Formation.

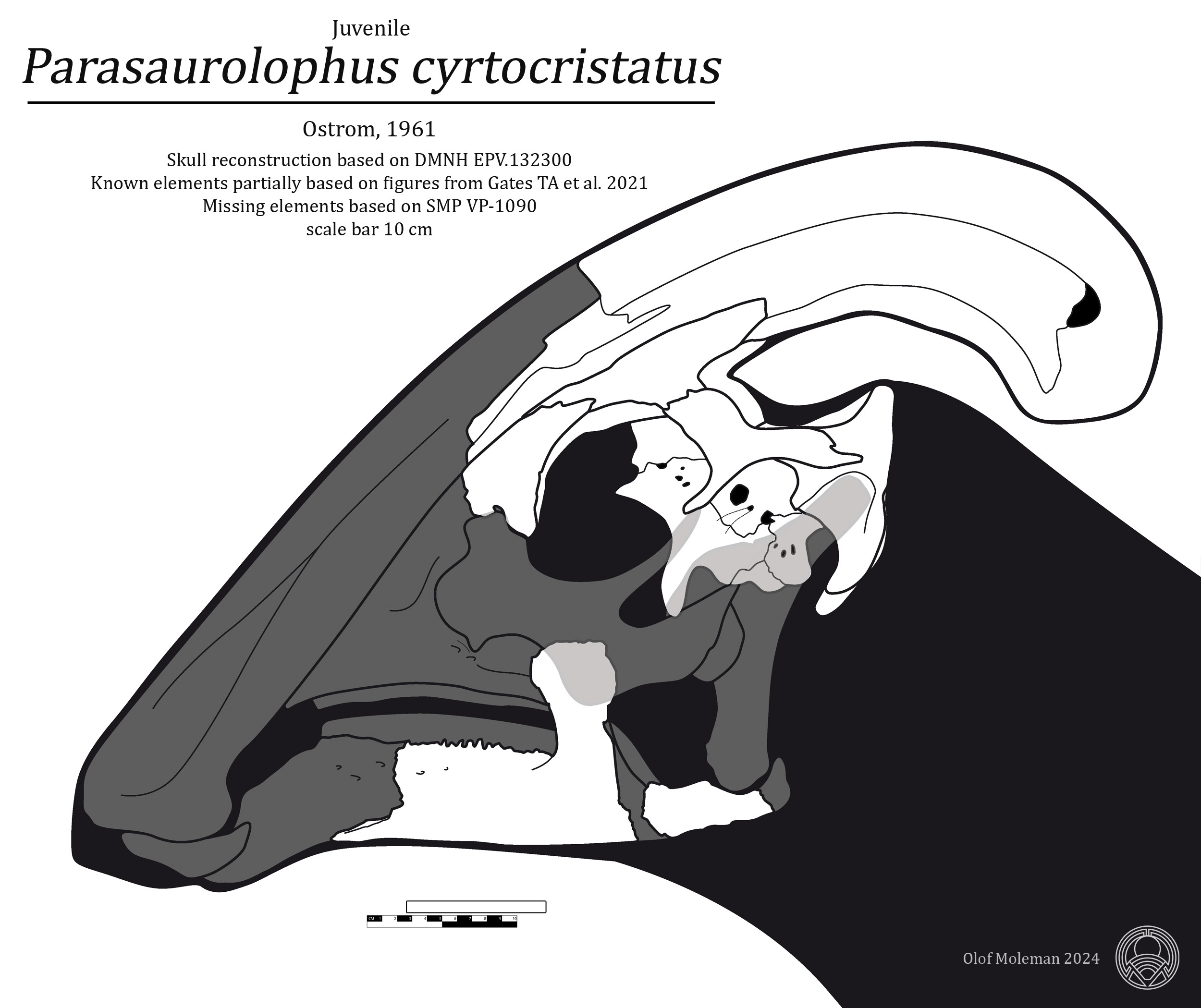
Skull diagram of juvenile P. cyrtocristatus

In 1961, the third species, P. cyrtocristatus was named by John Ostrom. Its three known specimens have been found in the Fruitland and Kaiparowits formations of Utah and New Mexico. The second specimen, the first known from the Kaiparowits Formation, was originally unassigned to a specific taxon. Of the Parasaurolophus species, P. cyrtocristatus is the smallest and has the most curved crest. Because of its possession of the two above features, it has often been speculated that it was a female of P. walkeri or P. tubicen, which were all thought to be males, although P. tubicen lived approximately a million years later. As noted by Thomas Williamson, the type material of P. cyrtocristatus is about 72% the size of P. tubicen, close to the size at which other lambeosaurines are interpreted to begin showing definitive sexual dimorphism in their crests (~70% of adult size). Even though many scientists have supported the possible fact of P. cyrtocristatus being a female, many other studies have found that it is not because of the differences in age, distribution, and the large differences in the crest and its internal structure.

A study published in PLoS ONE in 2014 found that one more species could be referred to Parasaurolophus. This study, led by Xing, found Charonosaurus jiayensis was actually nested deeply inside Parasaurolophus, which created the new species P. jiayensis. If this species is indeed inside Parasaurolophus, then the genus therefore lasted until the K-Pg extinction and is known from two continents.

== Description ==
Size comparison of P. cyrtocristatus (left, fuchsia) and P. walkeri (right, blue)

Like most dinosaurs, the skeleton of Parasaurolophus is incompletely known. The length of the type specimen of P. walkeri is estimated at 9.45 metres (31.0 ft), and allometry-based body mass estimates indicate that a 9 metres (30 ft) long individual would have weighed more than 5 metric tons (5.5 short tons). Gregory S. Paul estimated that an average adult individual of the type species would measure 7.5 metres (25 ft) long and weigh 2.6 metric tons (2.9 short tons). The skull of the P. walkeri type specimen is about 1.6 metres (5.2 ft) long, including the crest. Its single known arm was relatively short for a hadrosaurid, with a short but wide shoulder blade. The thighbone measures 103 cm (41 in) long in P. walkeri and is robust for its length when compared to other hadrosaurids. The upper arm and pelvic bones were also heavily built.

Like other hadrosaurids, it was able to walk on either two legs or four. It probably preferred to forage for food on four legs, but ran on two. The neural spines of the vertebrae were tall, as was common in lambeosaurines. At their tallest over the hips, they increased the height of the back. Skin impressions are known for P. walkeri, showing uniform tubercle-like scales, but no larger structures.

=== Skull ===
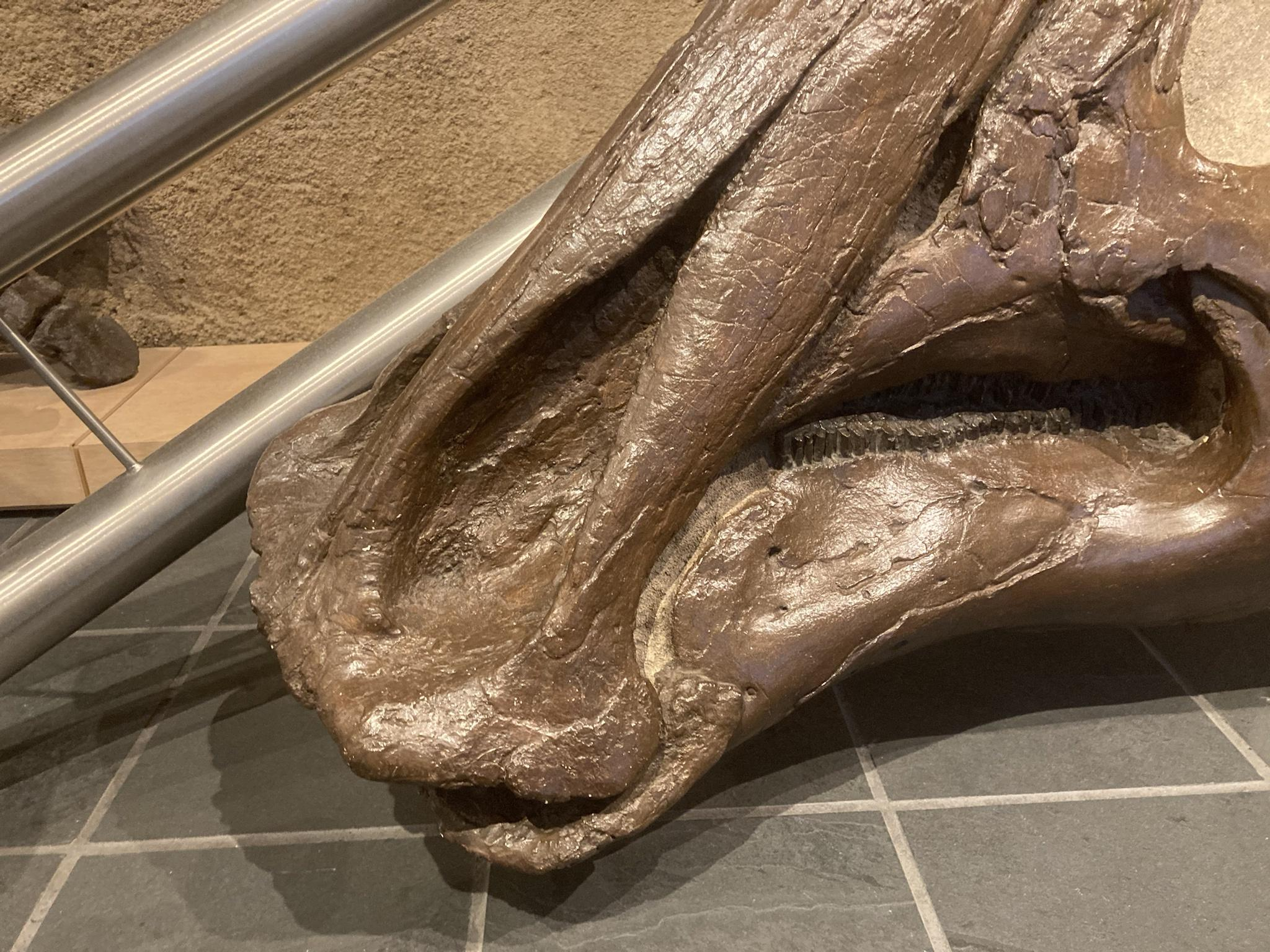
Closeup of P. walkeri beak and teeth

The most noticeable feature was the cranial crest that protruded from the rear of the head and was made up of the premaxilla and nasal bones. The crest was hollow, with distinct tubes leading from each nostril to the end of the crest before reversing direction and heading back down the crest and into the skull. The tubes were simplest in P. walkeri, and more complex in P. tubicen, where some tubes were blind and others met and separated. While P. walkeri and P. tubicen had long crests with slight curvature, P. cyrtocristatus had a short crest with a more circular profile.

== Classification ==
As its name implies, Parasaurolophus was initially thought to be closely related to Saurolophus because of its superficially similar crest. However, it was soon reassessed as a member of the lambeosaurine subfamily of hadrosaurids—Saurolophus is a hadrosaurine. It is usually interpreted as a separate offshoot of the lambeosaurines, distinct from the helmet-crested Corythosaurus, Hypacrosaurus, and Lambeosaurus. Its closest known relative appears to be Charonosaurus, a lambeosaurine with a similar skull (but no complete crest yet) from the Amur region of northeastern China. The two may form the clade called Parasaurolophini. P. cyrtocristatus, with its short, rounded crest, may be the most basal of the three known Parasaurolophus species or it may represent subadult or female specimens of P. tubicen.

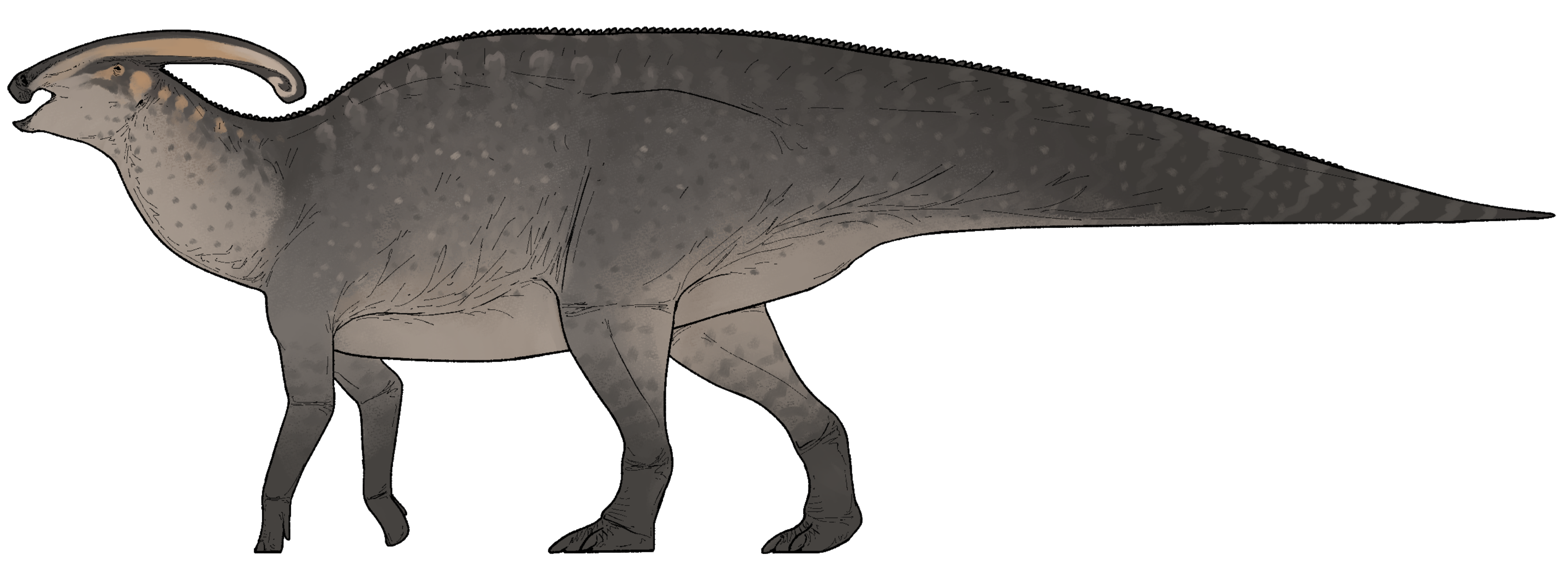
Restoration of P. walkeri

The following cladogram is after the 2007 redescription of Lambeosaurus magnicristatus (Evans and Reisz, 2007):

- Hadrosauridae
  - Hadrosaurinae
  - Lambeosaurinae
    - Aralosaurus
    - unnamed
      - Tsintaosaurus
      - unnamed
        - Jaxartosaurus
        - unnamed
          - Amurosaurus
          - unnamed
            - unnamed
              - Charonosaurus
              - Parasaurolophus
                - P. cyrtocristatus
                - unnamed
                  - P. tubicen
                  - P. walkeri
            - unnamed
              - Nipponosaurus
              - unnamed
                - unnamed
                  - Lambeosaurus lambei
                  - L. magnicristatus
                - unnamed
                  - Corythosaurus
                  - Olorotitan
                  - unnamed
                    - Hypacrosaurus altispinus
                    - H. stebingeri

== Paleobiology ==
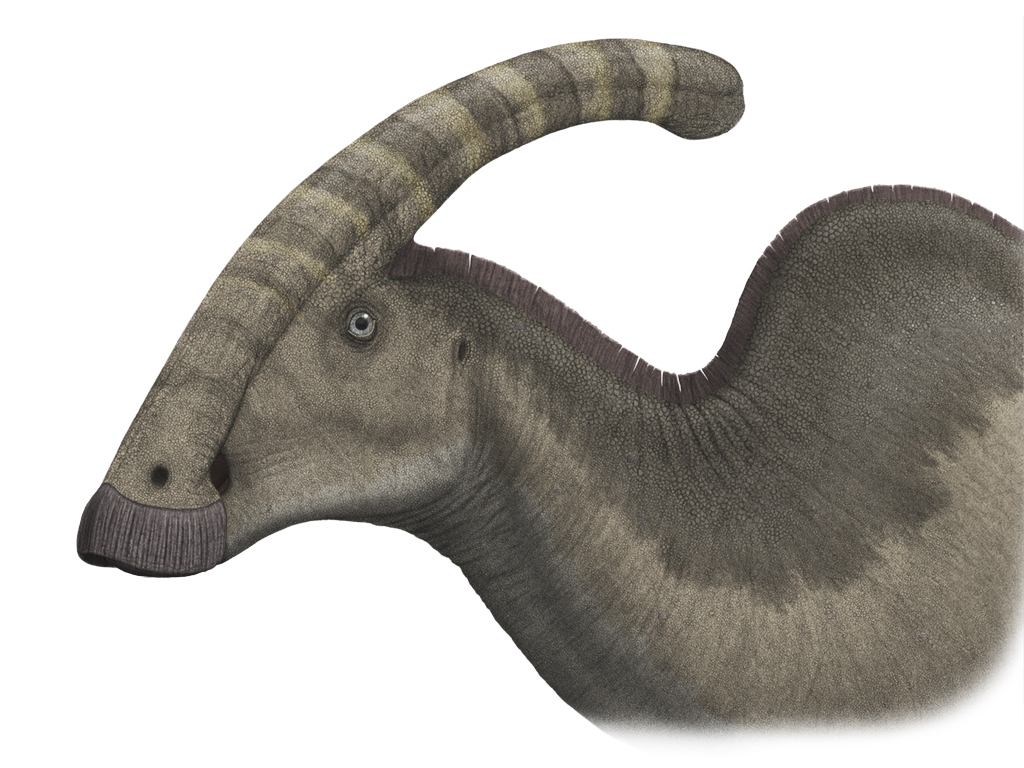
P. walkeri head with scalation detail

=== Diet and feeding ===
As a hadrosaurid, Parasaurolophus was a large bipedal and quadrupedal herbivore, eating plants with a sophisticated skull that permitted a grinding motion analogous to chewing. Its teeth were continually being replaced and were packed into dental batteries containing hundreds of teeth, but only a relative handful of which were in use at any time. It used its beak to crop plant material, which was held in the jaws by a cheek-like organ. Vegetation could have been taken from the ground up to a height of around 4 m (13 ft). As noted by Robert Bakker, lambeosaurines have narrower beaks than hadrosaurines, implying that Parasaurolophus and its relatives could feed more selectively than their broad-beaked, crestless counterparts. Parasaurolophus had a diet consisting of leaves, twigs, and pine needles which would imply that it was a browser.

=== Growth ===
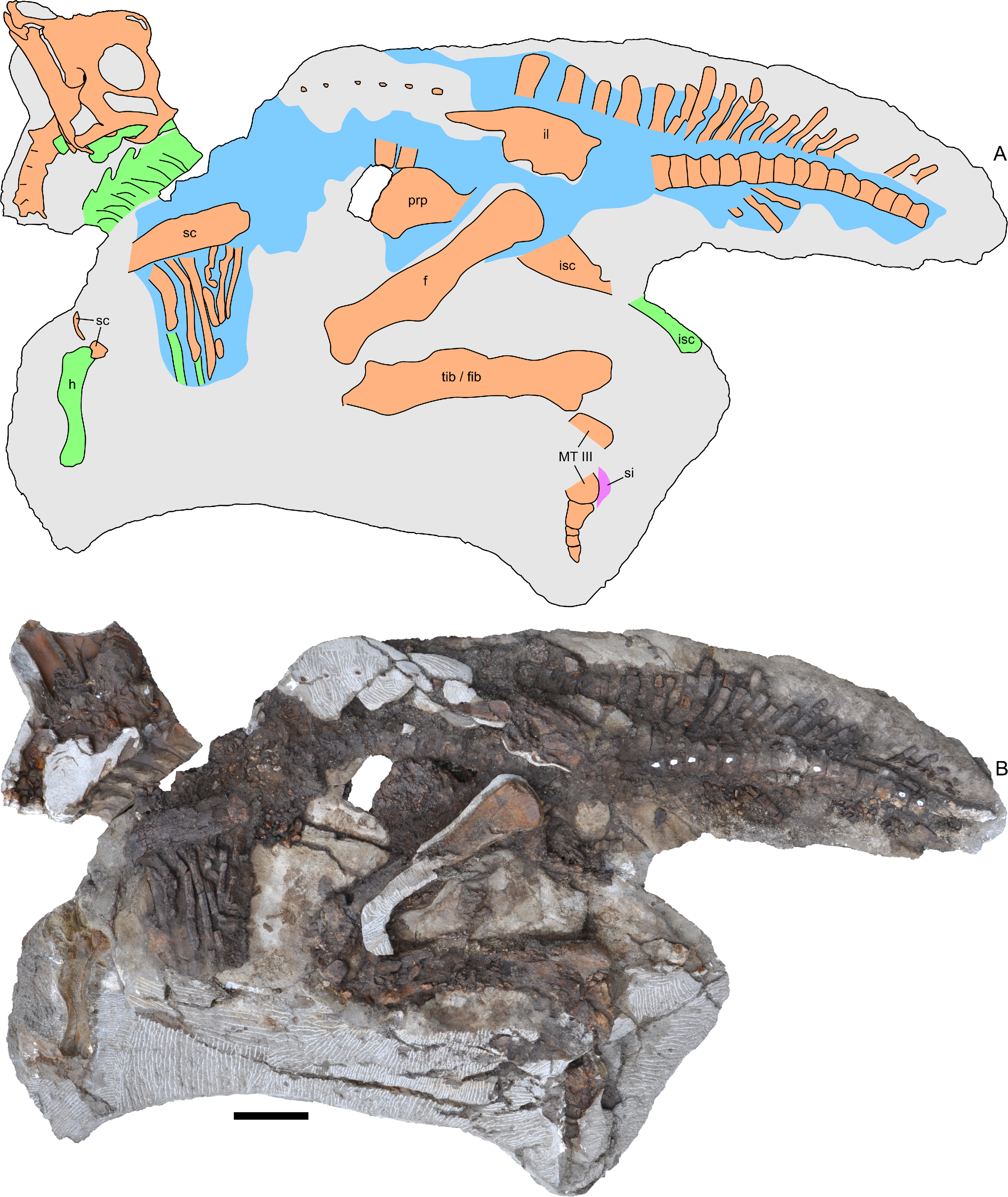
Juvenile skeleton RAM 14000 (nicknamed Joe)

Parasaurolophus is known from many adult specimens, and a juvenile described in 2013, numbered RAM 14000 and nicknamed Joe, after a volunteer at the Raymond M. Alf Museum of Paleontology (RAM). The juvenile was discovered in the Kaiparowits Formation in 2009. Excavated by the joint expedition by museum and The Webb Schools, the juvenile has been identified as around only one year old when it died. Referred to Parasaurolophus sp., the juvenile is the most complete, as well as youngest Parasaurolophus ever found, and measures 2.5 m (8.2 ft). This individual fits neatly into the currently known Parasaurolophus growth stages, and lived approximately 75 million years ago. Even though no complete skull of the intermediate age between RAM 14000 and adult Parasaurolophus has been found yet, a partial braincase of about the right size is known. At 25% of the total adult size, the juvenile show that crest growth of Parasaurolophus began sooner than in related genera, such as Corythosaurus. It has been suggested that Parasaurolophus adults bore such large crests, especially when compared to the related Corythosaurus, because of this difference in age between when their crests started developing. The crest of the juvenile is not long and tubular like the adults, but low and hemispherical.

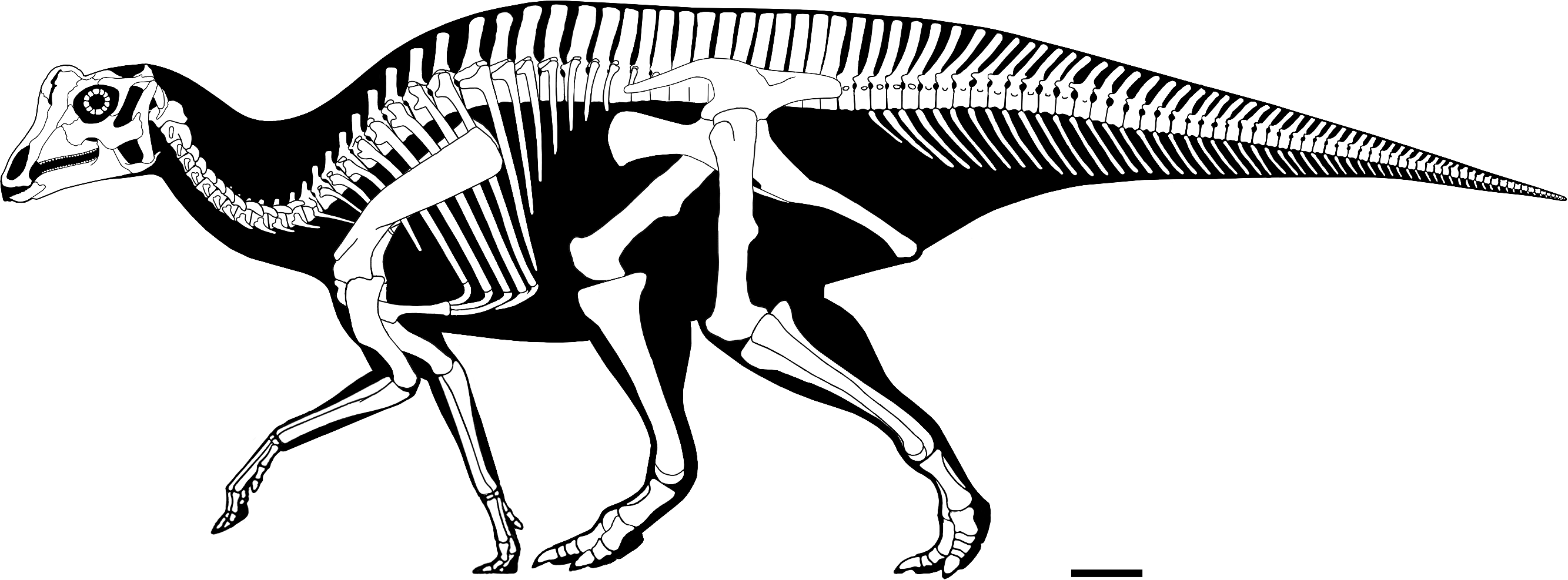
Reconstruction of a juvenile skeleton, based on RAM 14000

The skull of RAM 14000 is almost complete, with the left side only lacking a piece of the maxilla. However, the skull was split down the middle by erosion, possibly when it was resting on the bottom of a river bed. The two sides are displaced slightly, with some bones of the right being moved off the main block, also by erosion. After reconstruction, the skull viewed from the side resembles other juvenile lambeosaurines found, being roughly a trapezoid in shape.

A partial cranial endocast for RAM 14000 was reconstructed from CT scan data, the first ever for a Parasaurolophus of any ontogenetic stage. The endocast was reconstructed in two sections, one on the portion of the braincase articulated with the left half of the skull and the remainder on the disarticulated portion of the braincase. Their relative position was then approximated based on cranial landmarks and comparison with other hadrosaurids. Because of weathering, many of the smaller neural canals and foramina could not be identified for certain.

=== Cranial crest ===
Diagram showing internal features of the crest

Many hypotheses have been advanced as to what functions the cranial crest of Parasaurolophus performed, but most have been discredited. It is now believed that it may have had several functions: visual display for identifying species and sex, sound amplification for communication, and thermoregulation. It is not clear which was most significant at what times in the evolution of the crest and its internal nasal passages.

==== Differences in crests ====
As for other lambeosaurines, it is believed that the cranial crest of Parasaurolophus changed with age and was a sexually dimorphic characteristic in adults. James Hopson, one of the first researchers to describe lambeosaurine crests in terms of such distinctions, suggested that P. cyrtocristatus, with its small crest, was the female form of P. tubicen. Thomas Williamson suggested it was the juvenile form. Neither hypothesis became widely accepted. As only six good skulls, one juvenile braincase, and one recently discovered juvenile skull are known, additional material will help clear up these potential relationships. Williamson noted that in any case, juvenile Parasaurolophus probably had small, rounded crests like P. cyrtocristatus, that probably grew faster as individuals approached sexual maturity. Recent restudy of a juvenile braincase previously assigned to Lambeosaurus, now assigned to Parasaurolophus, provides evidence that a small tubular crest was present in juveniles. This specimen preserves a small upward flaring of the frontal bones that was similar to but smaller than what is seen in adult specimens; in adults, the frontals formed a platform that supported the base of the crest. This specimen also indicates that the growth of the crest in Parasaurolophus and the facial profile of juvenile individuals differed from the Corythosaurus-Hypacrosaurus-Lambeosaurus model, in part because the crest of Parasaurolophus lacks the thin bony 'coxcomb' that makes up the upper portion of the crest of the other three lambeosaurines.

==== Rejected function hypotheses ====
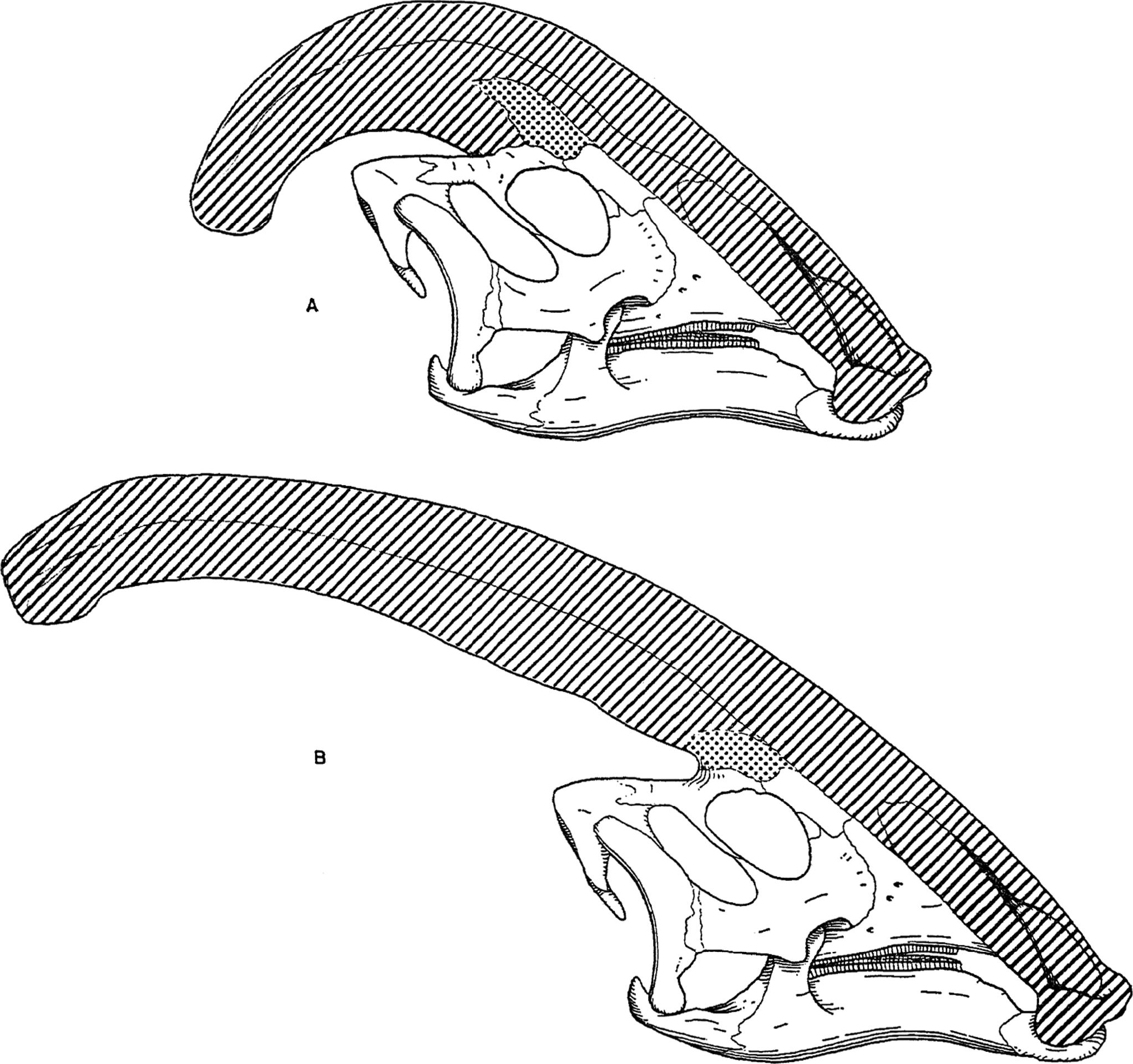
Comparison drawing between the crests of P. cyrtocristatus (above) and P. walkeri (below)

Many early suggestions focused on adaptations for an aquatic lifestyle, following the hypothesis that hadrosaurids were amphibious, a common line of thought until the 1960s. Thus, Alfred Sherwood Romer proposed it served as a snorkel, Martin Wilfarth that it was an attachment for a mobile proboscis used as a breathing tube or for food gathering, Charles M. Sternberg that it served as an airtrap to keep water out of the lungs, and Ned Colbert that it served as an air reservoir for prolonged stays underwater.

Other proposals were more mechanical in nature. William Parks, in 1922, suggested that the crest was joined to the vertebrae above the shoulders by ligaments or muscles, and helped with moving and supporting the head. This is unlikely, because in all modern archosaurs, the nuchal ligament attaches to the neck or base of the skull. Othenio Abel proposed it was used as a weapon in combat among members of the same species, and Andrew Milner suggested that it could be used as a foliage deflector, like the helmet crest (called a 'casque') of the cassowary. Still, other proposals made housing specialized organs the major function. Halszka Osmólska suggested that it housed salt glands, and John Ostrom suggested that it housed expanded areas for olfactory tissue and much improved sense of smell of the lambeosaurines, which had no obvious defensive capabilities.

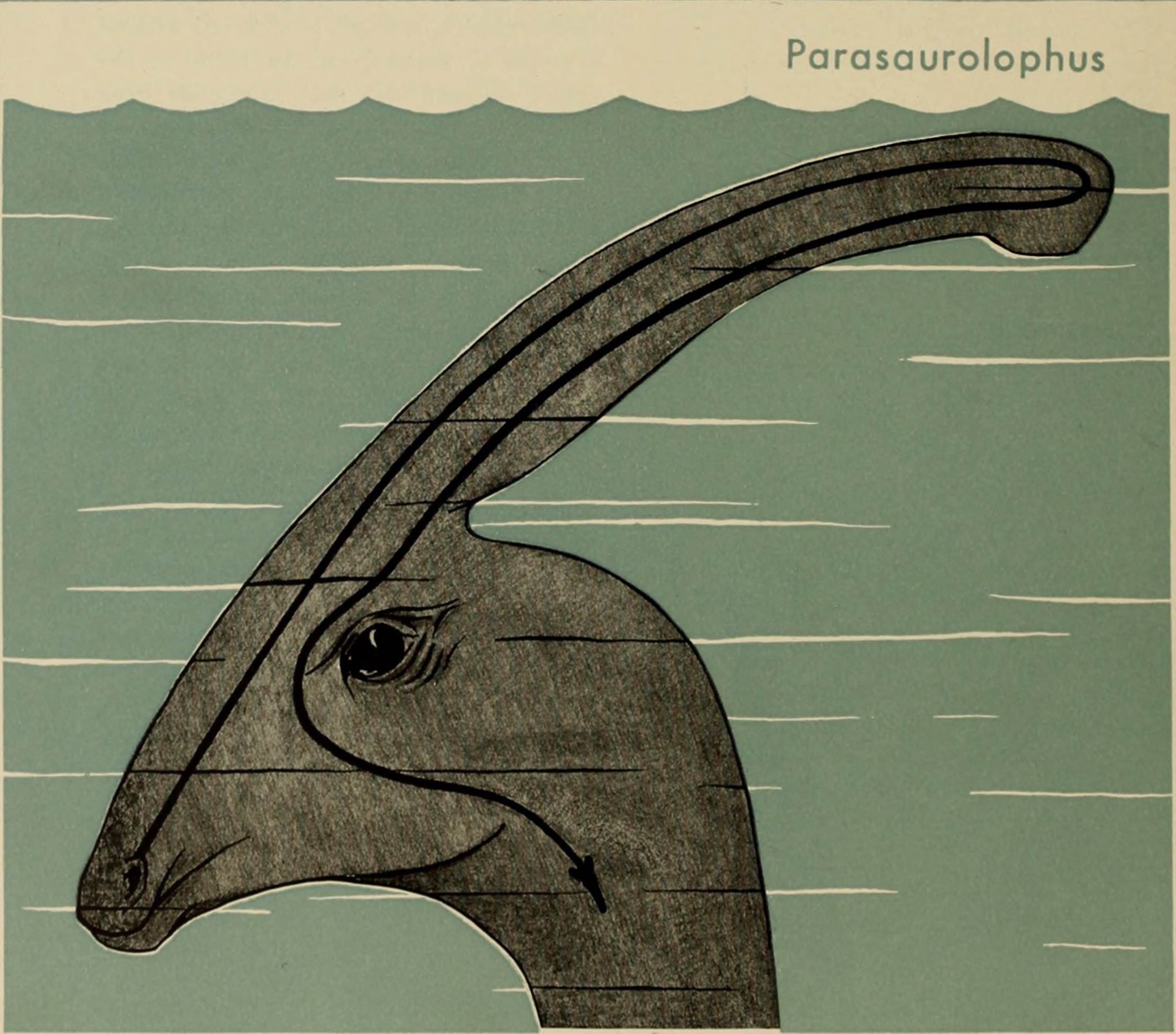
Outdated 1945 restoration showing the crest used as an air reservoir

Most of these hypotheses have been discredited or rejected. For example, there is no hole at the end of the crest for a snorkeling function. There are no muscle scars for a proboscis and it is dubious that an animal with a beak would need one. As a proposed airlock, it would not have kept out water. The proposed air reservoir would have been insufficient for an animal the size of Parasaurolophus. Other hadrosaurids had large heads without needing large hollow crests to serve as attachment points for supporting ligaments. Also, none of the proposals explain why the crest has such a shape, why other lambeosaurines should have crests that look much different but perform a similar function, how crestless or solid-crested hadrosaurids got along without such capabilities, or why some hadrosaurids had solid crests. These considerations particularly impact hypotheses based on increasing the capabilities of systems already present in the animal, such as the salt gland and olfaction hypotheses, and indicate that these were not primary functions of the crest. Additionally, work on the nasal cavity of lambeosaurines shows that olfactory nerves and corresponding sensory tissue were largely outside the portion of the nasal passages in the crest, so the expansion of the crest had little to do with the sense of smell.

==== Temperature regulation hypothesis ====
The large surface area and vascularization of the crest also suggests a thermoregulatory function. The first to propose the cranial crests of lambeosaurines related to temperature regulation was Wheeler (1978). He proposed that there was a nerve connection between the crest and the brain, so that the latter could be cooled by the former. The next people to publish a related idea were Teresa Maryańska and Osmólska, who realized that like modern lizards, dinosaurs could have possessed salt glands, and cooled off by osmo-regulation. In 2006 Evans published an argument about the functions of lambeosaurine crests, and supported why this could be a causing factor for the evolution of the crest.

==== Behavioral hypotheses ====
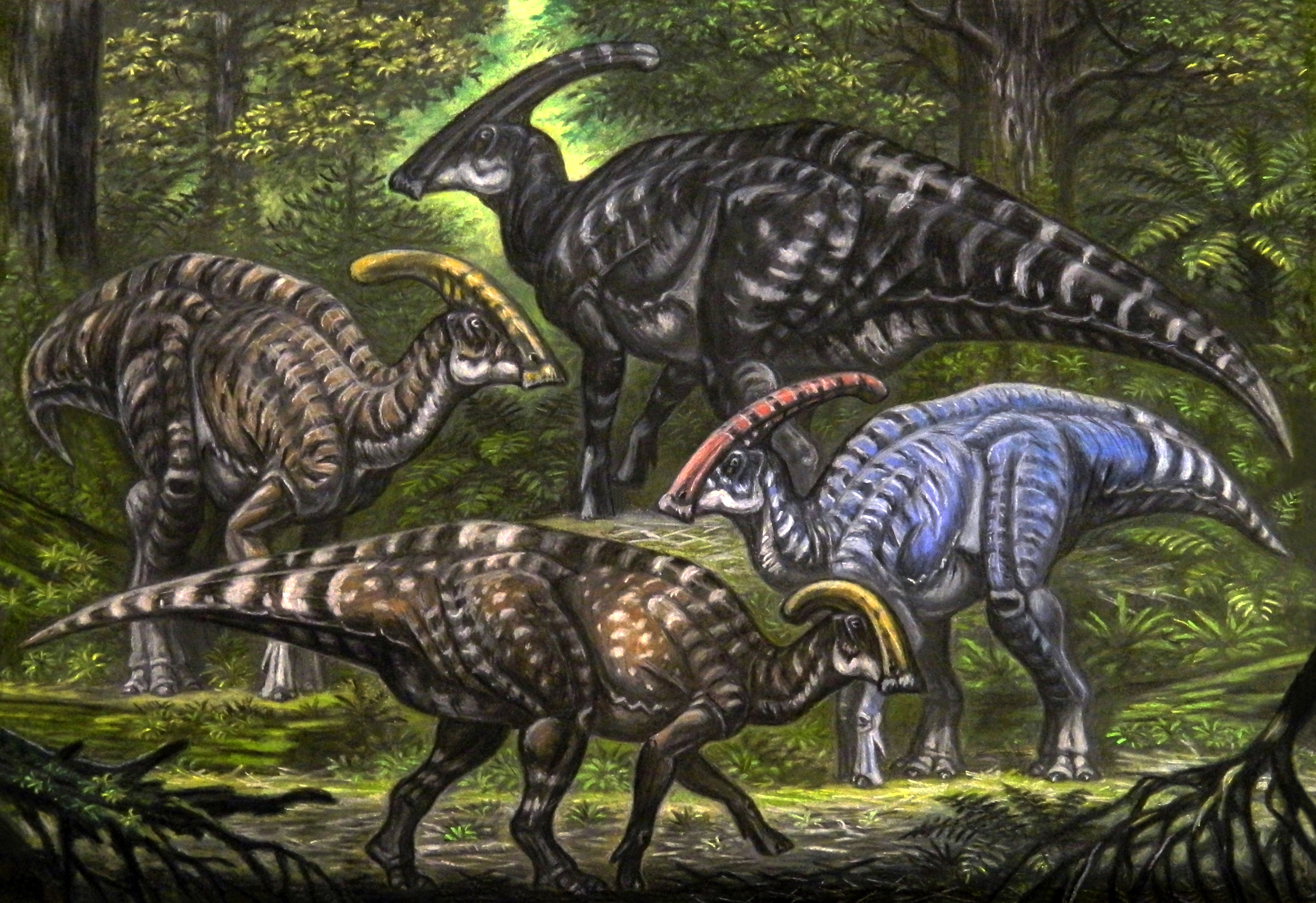
Restoration of Charonosaurus, P. tubicen, P. walkeri, and P. cyrtocristatus

Parasaurolophus is often hypothesized to have used its crest as a resonating chamber to produce low frequency sounds to alert other members of a group or its species. This function was originally suggested by Wiman in 1931 when he described P. tubicen. He noted that the crest's internal structures are similar to those of a swan and theorized that an animal could use its elongated nasal passages to create noise. However, the nasal tubes of Hypacrosaurus, Corythosaurus, and Lambeosaurus are much more variable and complicated than the airway of Parasaurolophus. A large amount of material and data supports the hypothesis that the large, tubular crest of Parasaurolophus was a resonating chamber. Weishampel in 1981 suggested that Parasaurolophus made noises ranging between the frequencies 55 and 720 Hz, although there was some difference in the range of individual species because of the crest size, shape, and nasal passage length, most obvious in P. cyrtocristatus (interpreted as a possible female). Hopson found that there is anatomical evidence that hadrosaurids had a strong hearing. There is at least one example, in the related Corythosaurus, of a slender stapes (reptilian ear bone) in place, which combined with a large space for an eardrum implies a sensitive middle ear. Furthermore, the hadrosaurid lagena is elongate like a crocodilian's, indicating that the auditory portion of the inner ear was well-developed. Based on the similarity of hadrosaurid inner ears to those of crocodiles, he also proposed that adult hadrosaurids were sensitive to high frequencies, such as their offspring might produce. According to Weishampel, this is consistent with parents and offspring communicating.

Computer modeling of a well-preserved specimen of P. tubicen, with more complex air passages than those of P. walkeri, has allowed the reconstruction of the possible sound its crest produced. The main path resonates at around 30 Hz, but the complicated sinus anatomy causes peaks and valleys in the sound. The other main behavioral theory is that the crest was used for intra-species recognition. This means that the crest could have been used for species recognition, as a warning signal, and for other, non-sexual uses. These could have been some of the reasons crests evolved in Parasaurolophus and other hadrosaurids. Instead, social and physiological functions have become more supported as function(s) of the crest, focusing on visual and auditory identification and communication. As a large object, the crest has clear value as a visual signal and sets this animal apart from its contemporaries. The large size of hadrosaurid eye sockets and the presence of scleral rings in the eyes imply acute vision, evidence that sight was important to these animals. If, as is commonly illustrated, a skin frill extended from the crest to the neck or back, the proposed visual display would have been even showier. As is suggested by other lambeosaurine skulls, the crest of Parasaurolophus likely permitted both species identification (such as separating it from Corythosaurus or Lambeosaurus) and sexual identification by shape and size.

==== Soft tissue frill ====
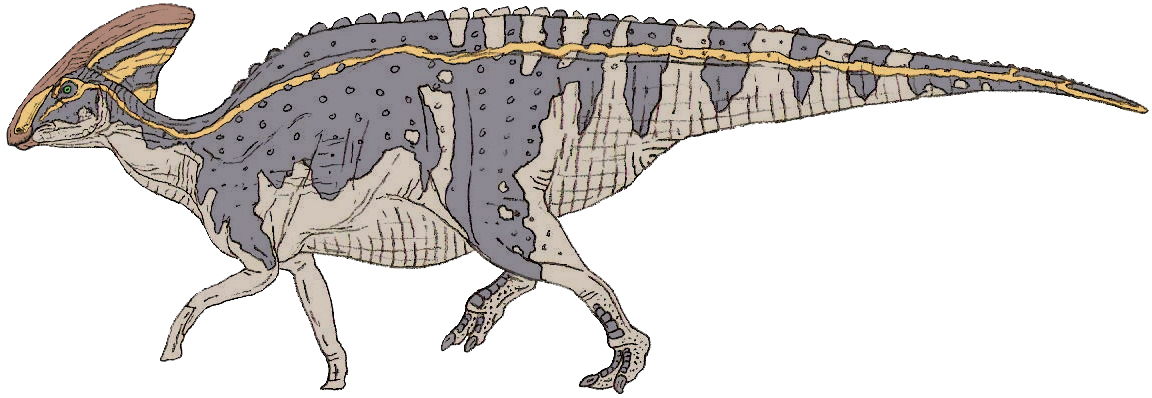
Restoration of P. walkeri with hypothetical skin frill

Barnum Brown (1912) noted the presence of fine striations near the back of the crest that he hypothesized could be associated with the presence of a frill of skin, comparable to the one found in the modern basilisk lizard. His hypothesis was seemingly supported by skin preserved above the neck and back of Corythosaurus and Edmontosaurus. Subsequently, reconstructions of Parasaurolophus with a substantial frill of skin between the crest and neck appeared in influential paleoart including murals by Charles R. Knight and in the Walt Disney animated film, Fantasia. This led to the frill being depicted in many other sources, though the advent of the now-debunked "snorkel" hypothesis, and conflation of the frill hypothesis with the idea that the crest serves as an anchor point for neck ligaments, along with lack of strong evidence for its presence, has seen it fall out of favor in most modern depictions.

=== Paleopathology ===
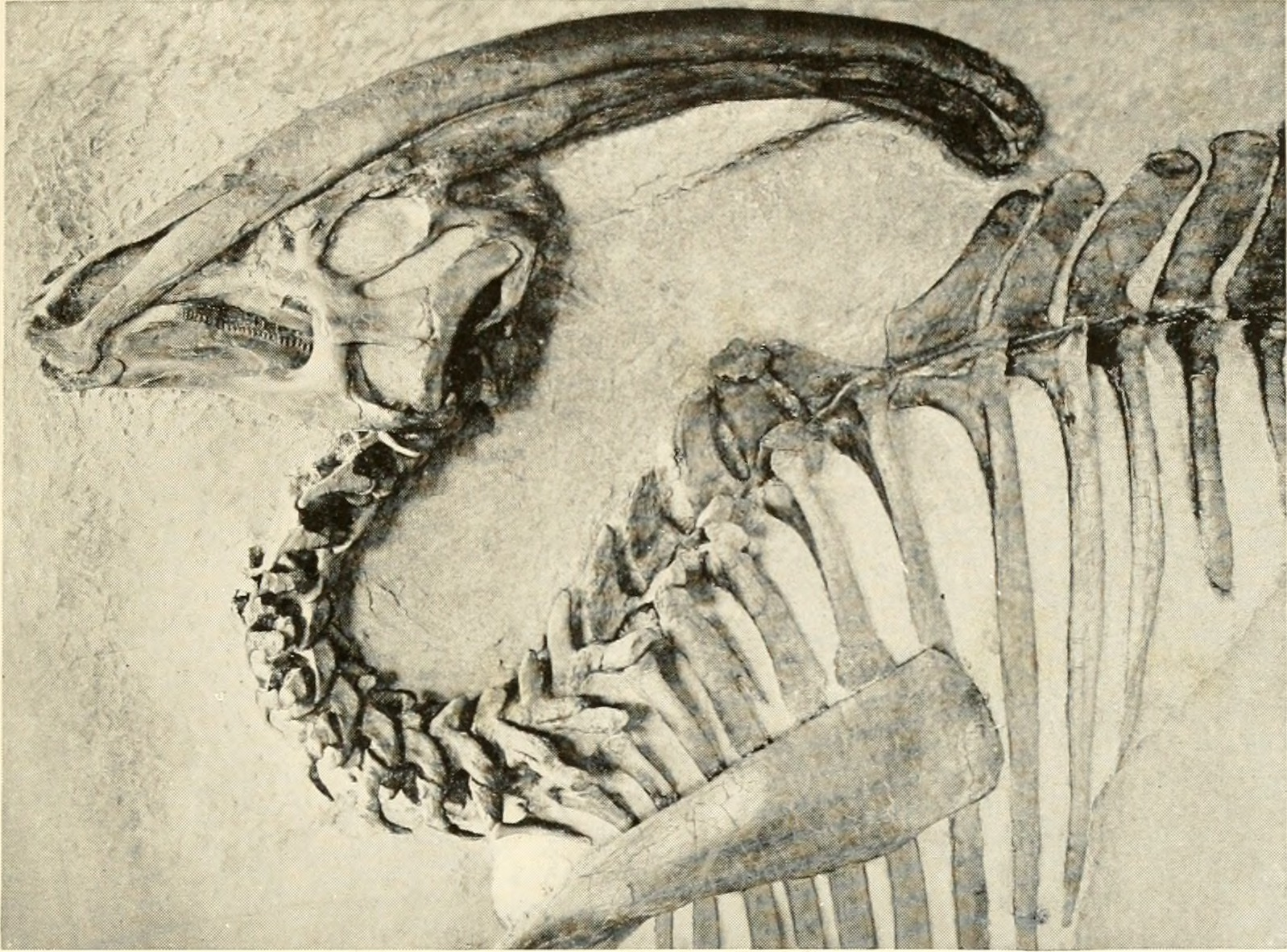
P. walkeri with notch in the vertebrae

P. walkeri is known from one specimen which might contain a pathology. The skeleton shows a v-shaped gap or notch in the vertebrae at the base of the neck. Originally thought to be pathologic, Parks published a second interpretation of this, as a ligament attachment to support the head. The crest would attach to the gap via muscles or ligaments, and be used to support the head while bearing a frill, like predicted to exist in some hadrosaurids. One other possibility is that, during preparation, the specimen was damaged, creating the possible pathology. The notch, however, is still considered more likely to be a pathology, even though some illustrations of Parasaurolophus restore the skin flap.

Another possible pathology was noticed by Parks, and from around the notch. In the fourth, fifth, and sixth vertebrae, directly anterior to the notch, the neural spines were damaged. The fourth had an obvious fracture, with the other two possessing a swelling at the base of the break.

Analysis of the pathology undertaken by Bertozzo et al., published in December 2020, suggests the pathology to the shoulder and thoracic ribs in the holotype of P. walkeri was plausibly the result of the dinosaur being hit by a falling tree, perhaps during a severe storm. Based on the regrowth of bone, it is suggested that the hadrosaur survived for at least one to four months to perhaps years after being injured. None of the pathologies on the holotype individual are believed to have caused or contributed to its death.

== Paleoecology ==
=== Alberta ===
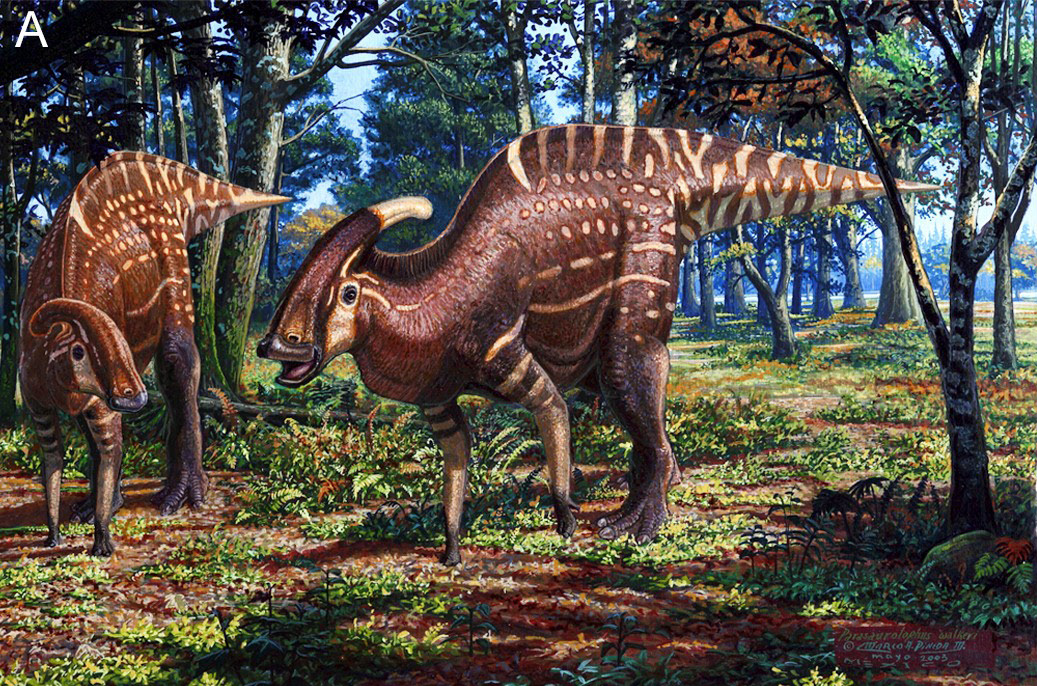
P. walkeri in Dinosaur Park Formation environment

Parasaurolophus walkeri, from the Dinosaur Park Formation, was a member of a diverse and well-documented fauna of prehistoric animals, including well-known dinosaurs such as the horned Centrosaurus, Chasmosaurus, and Styracosaurus; ornithomimids Struthiomimus; fellow duckbills Gryposaurus and Corythosaurus; tyrannosaurids Gorgosaurus and Daspletosaurus; and armored Edmontonia, Euoplocephalus and Dyoplosaurus. It was a rare constituent of this fauna. The Dinosaur Park Formation is interpreted as a low-relief setting of rivers and floodplains that became more swampy and influenced by marine conditions over time as the Western Interior Seaway transgressed westward. The climate was warmer than present-day Alberta, without frost, but with wetter and drier seasons. Conifers were apparently the dominant canopy plants, with an understory of ferns, tree ferns, and angiosperms.

Some of the less common hadrosaurs in the Dinosaur Park Formation of Dinosaur Provincial Park, such as Parasaurolophus, may represent the remains of individuals who died while migrating through the region. They might also have had a more upland habitat where they may have nested or fed. The presence of Parasaurolophus and Kritosaurus in northern latitude fossil sites may represent faunal exchange between otherwise distinct northern and southern biomes in Late Cretaceous North America. Both taxa are uncommon outside of the southern biome, where, along with Pentaceratops, they are predominate members of the fauna.

=== New Mexico ===
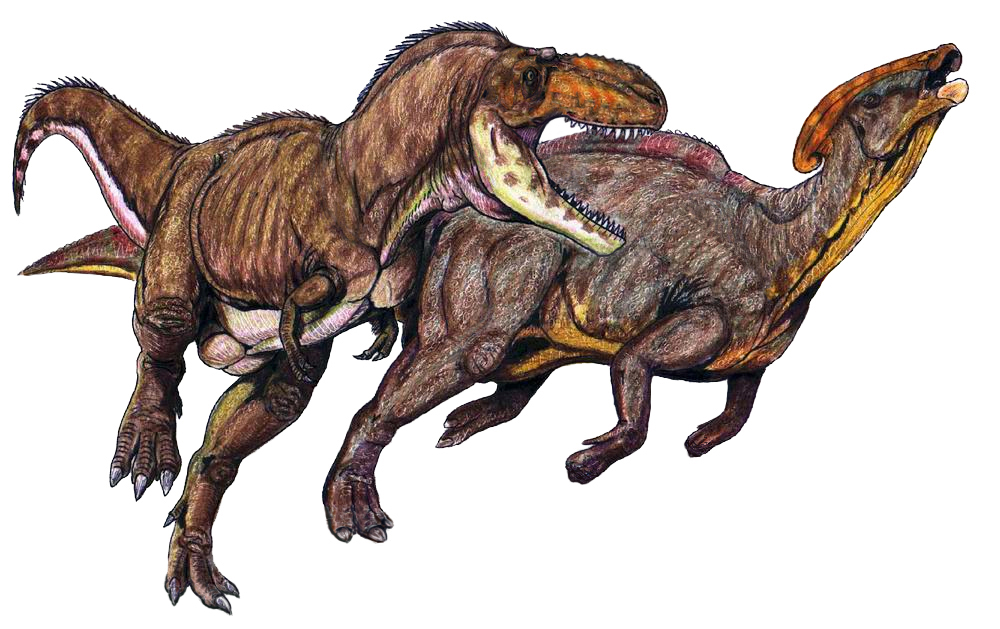
Teratophoneus attacking a P. cyrtocristatus

In the Fruitland Formation of New Mexico, P. cyrtocristatus shared its habitat with other ornithischians and theropods. Specifically, its contemporaries were the ceratopsian Pentaceratops sternbergii; the pachycephalosaur Stegoceras novomexicanum; and some unidentified fossils belonging to Tyrannosauridae, ?Ornithomimus, ?Troodontidae, ?Saurornitholestes langstoni, ?Struthiomimus, Ornithopoda, ?Chasmosaurus, ?Corythosaurus, Hadrosaurinae, Hadrosauridae, and Ceratopsidae. When Parasaurolophus existed, the Fruitland Formation was swampy, positioned in the lowlands, and close to the shore of the Cretaceous Interior Seaway. The lowermost part of the Fruitland Formation is just younger than 75.56 ± 0.41 mya, with the uppermost boundary dating to 74.55 ± 0.22 mya.

Existing slightly later than the species from the Fruitland Formation, P. tubicen is also found in New Mexico, in the Kirtland Formation. Numerous vertebrate groups are from this formation, including fishes, crurotarsans, ornithischians, saurischians, pterosaurs, and turtles. The fishes are represented by the two species Melvius chauliodous and Myledalphus bipartitus. The crurotarsans include Brachychampsa montana and Denazinosuchus kirtlandicus. Ornithischians from the formation are represented by the hadrosaurids Anasazisaurus horneri, Naashoibitosaurus ostromi, Kritosaurus navajovius, and P. tubicen; the ankylosaurids Ahshislepelta minor and Nodocephalosaurus kirtlandensis; the ceratopsians Pentaceratops sternbergii and Titanoceratops ouranos; and the pachycephalosaurs Stegoceras novomexicanum and Sphaerotholus goodwini. Saurischians include the tyrannosaurid Bistahieversor sealeyi; the ornithomimid Ornithomimus sp.; and the troodontid "Saurornitholestes" robustus. One pterosaur is known, named Navajodactylus boerei. Turtles are fairly plentiful, and are known from Denazinemys nodosa, Basilemys nobilis, Neurankylus baueri, Plastomenus robustus and Thescelus hemispherica. Unidentified taxa are known, including the crurotarsan ?Leidyosuchus, and the theropods ?Struthiomimus, Troodontidae and Tyrannosauridae. The beginning of the Kirtland Formation dates to 74.55 ± 0.22 mya, with the formation ending at around 73.05 ± 0.25 mya.

=== Utah ===
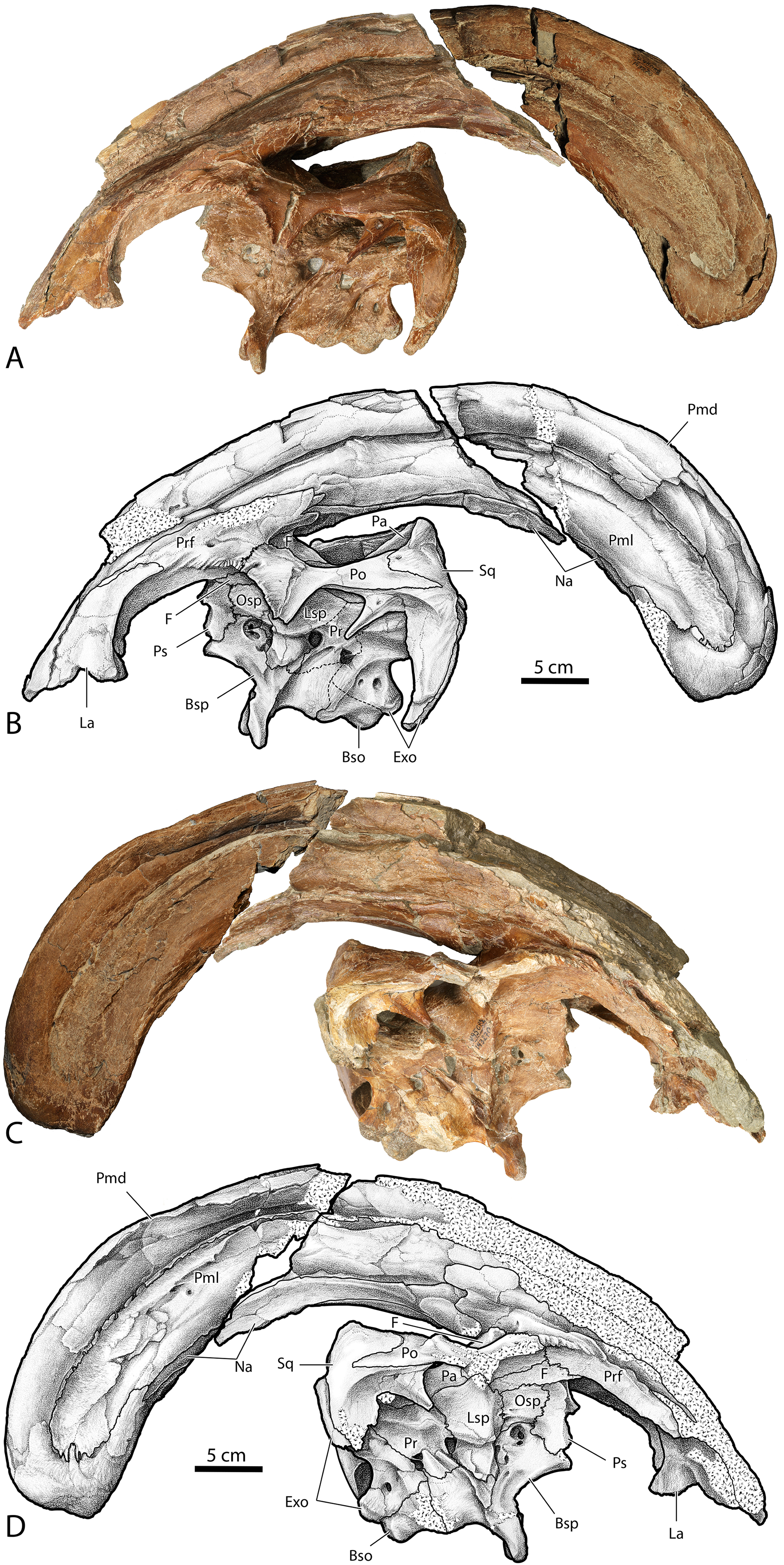
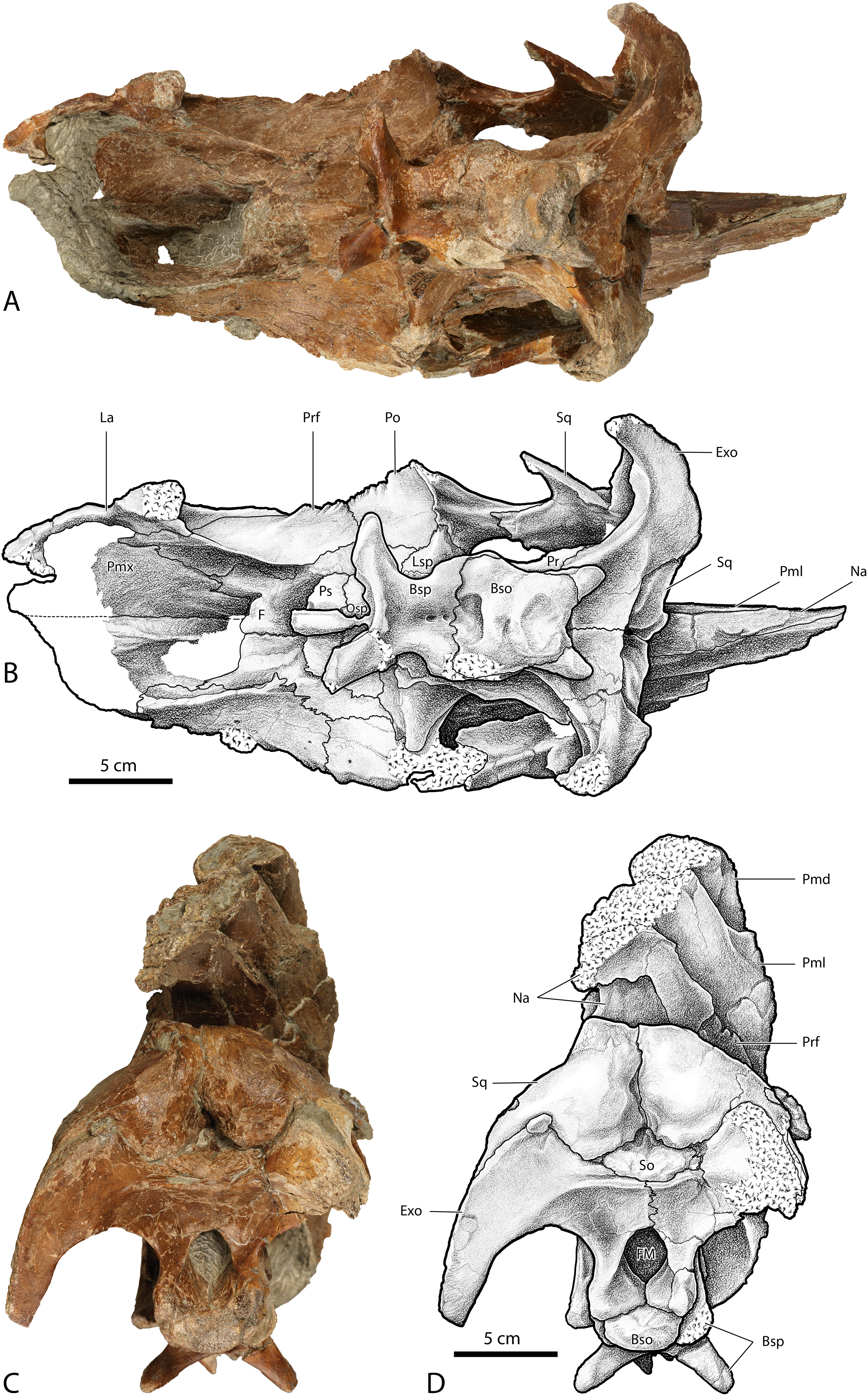
Skull from the Kaiparowits Formation tentatively assigned to P. cyrtocristatus

Argon-argon radiometric dating indicates that the Kaiparowits Formation was deposited between 76.6 and 74.5 million years ago, during the Campanian age of the Late Cretaceous period. During the Late Cretaceous period, the site of the Kaiparowits Formation was located near the western shore of the Western Interior Seaway, a large inland sea that split North America into two landmasses, Laramidia to the west and Appalachia to the east. The plateau where dinosaurs lived was an ancient floodplain dominated by large channels and abundant wetland peat swamps, ponds and lakes, and was bordered by highlands. The climate was wet and humid, and supported an abundant and diverse range of organisms. This formation contains one of the best and most continuous records of Late Cretaceous terrestrial life in the world.

Parasaurolophus shared its paleoenvironment with other dinosaurs, such as dromaeosaurid theropods, the troodontid Talos sampsoni, ornithomimids like Ornithomimus velox, tyrannosaurids like Teratophoneus, armored ankylosaurids, the duckbilled hadrosaur Gryposaurus monumentensis, the ceratopsians Utahceratops gettyi, Nasutoceratops titusi and Kosmoceratops richardsoni and the oviraptorosaurian Hagryphus giganteus. Paleofauna present in the Kaiparowits Formation included chondrichthyans (sharks and rays), frogs, salamanders, turtles, lizards and crocodilians like the apex predator Deinosuchus. A variety of early mammals were present including multituberculates, marsupials, and insectivorans.

== See also ==
- Timeline of hadrosaur research
