= Fruitland Formation =

Geological formation in New Mexico and Colorado

- Stratigraphic range: Campanian; ~76.3–75 Ma
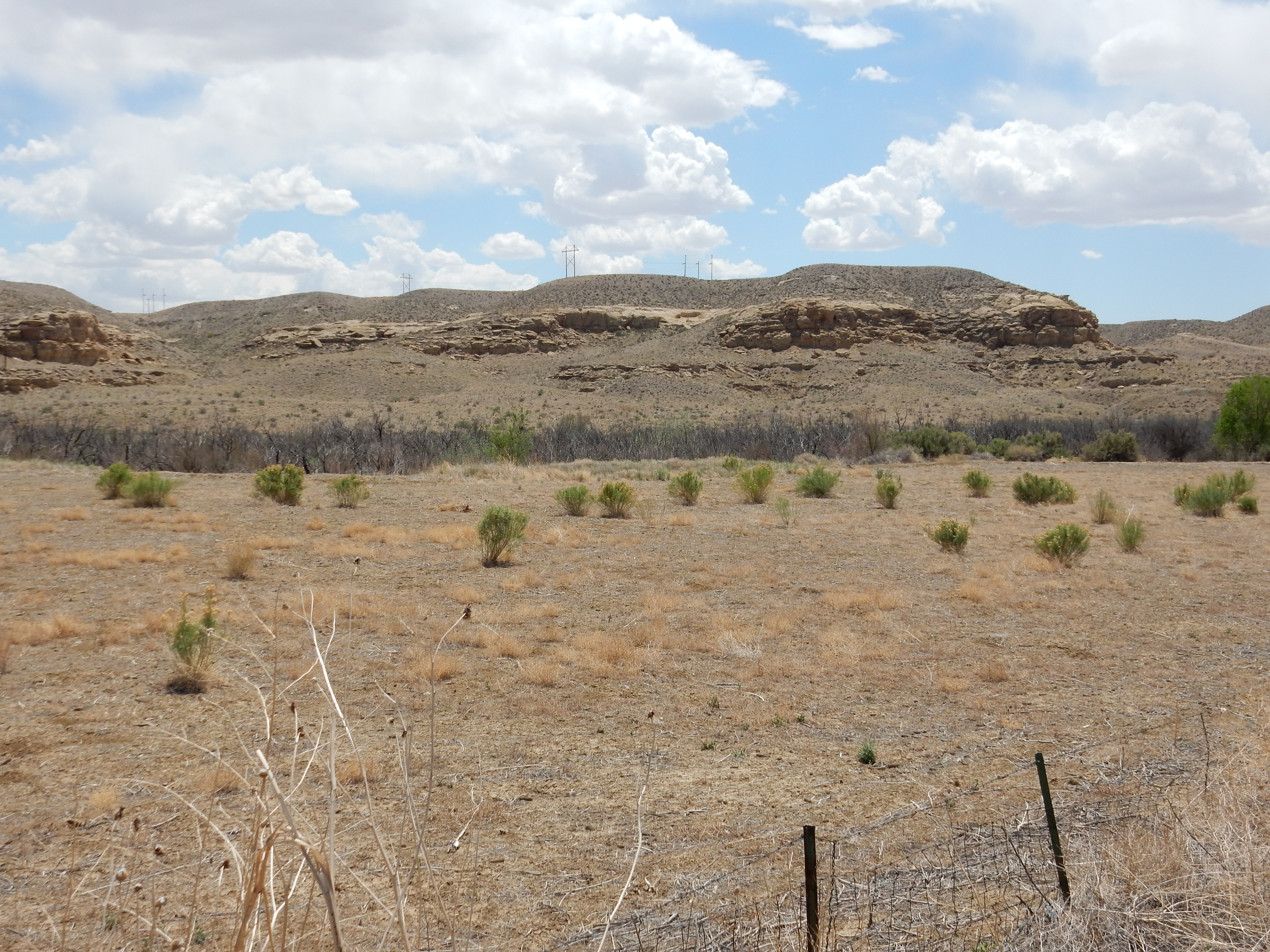
- Fruitland Formation at its type location north of Fruitland, New Mexico
- Type: Geological formation
- Sub-units: Fossil Forest Member; Ne-nah-ne-zad Member
- Underlies: Kirtland Formation
- Overlies: Pictured Cliffs Sandstone

Lithology
- Primary: Sandstone
- Other: Shale, coal

Location
- Coordinates: 36.752°N 108.442°W
- Approximate paleocoordinates: 43.5°N 79.6°W
- Region: New Mexico, Colorado
- Country: United States
- Fruitland Formation (the United States) Fruitland Formation (New Mexico)

The Fruitland Formation is a geologic formation found in the San Juan Basin in the states of New Mexico and Colorado, in the United States of America. It contains fossils dating it to the Campanian age of the late Cretaceous.

The Fruitland Formation shares its name with Fruitland, New Mexico. That city is on what was the western shore of the Western Interior Seaway.

== Description ==
The Fruitland Formation is a sedimentary geological formation containing layers of sandstone, shale, and coal. It was laid down in marshy delta conditions, with poor drainage and frequent flooding, under a warm, humid and seasonal climate.

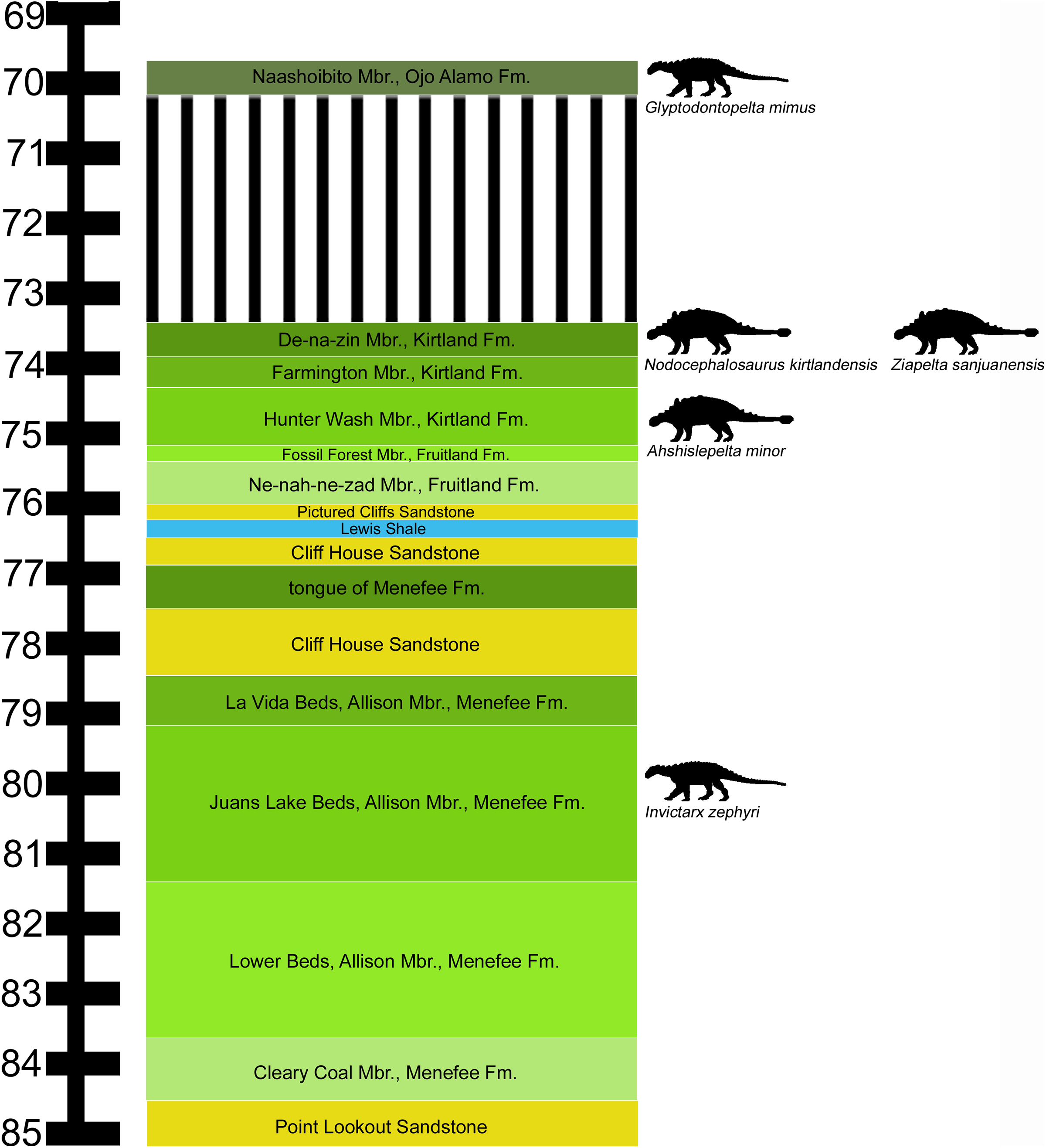
San Juan Basin Upper Cretaceous stratigraphy

The Fruitland is underlain by the Pictured Cliffs Sandstone, and overlain by the more recent Kirtland Formation. The sequence of rocks represents the final filling of the Cretaceous seaway. The underlying Pictured Cliffs is a marginal marine sandstone, deposited in an environment similar to offshore barrier islands of the southeast United States. As the seaway retreated, the Pictured Cliffs was covered by the Fruitland Formation, which was deposited in near-shore swampy lowlands. The formation is dated to the late Campanian (part of the Cretaceous period), and was deposited over a period of about a million years. Radiometric dating from 23 meters above the base of the formation has yielded an age of 76.03 ± 0.41 Ma ago. An ash bed lying above the upper boundary with the Kirtland Formation has been dated to 75.02 ± 0.13 Ma ago. The underlying Pictured Cliffs Sandstone would be dated 76.94 - 76.27 Ma, based on the presence of the ammonite Baculites scotti, therefore placing the base of the Fruitland Formation at ~76.3 Ma.

The formation is subdivided into the upper Fossil Forrest Member (deposited between about 75.5-75 million years ago) and the lower Ne-nah-ne-zad Member (deposited from 76.3-75.5 million years ago). The Fossil Forrest member is considered to be part of the Hunter Wash, fauna shared with the overlying lower Kirtland Formation.

== Paleofauna ==
=== Ornithischians ===
Ornithischians of the Fruitland Formation
Genus	Species	Member	Abundance	Notes	Images
Hadrosauridae indet.	Intermediate	Fossil Forest	One print	Giant hadrosaur track, indicating an individual larger than Shantungosaurus, the largest known hadrosaur.	Parasaurolophus Pentaceratops Stegoceras Titanoceratops
Parasaurolophus	P. cyrtocristatus	Fossil Forest	A partial skull associated with a mostly complete postcranial skeleton, and a partial skull and fragmentary ribs of a juvenile individual.	A lambeosaurine hadrosaurid also known from the Kaiparowits Formation.	Parasaurolophus Pentaceratops Stegoceras Titanoceratops
Pentaceratops	P. sternbergii	Fossil Forest	[Two] nearly complete skulls and a nearly complete frill.	A chasmosaurine ceratopsid also known from the Kirtland Formation.	Parasaurolophus Pentaceratops Stegoceras Titanoceratops
Stegoceras	S. novomexicanum	Fossil Forest	Partial remains of [three] frontals and nearly complete frontoparietal.	A basal pachycephalosaurid also known from the lower Kirtland Formation.	Parasaurolophus Pentaceratops Stegoceras Titanoceratops
Titanoceratops	T. ouranos		A partial skull, syncervical vertebrae, cervical vertebrae, dorsal vertebrae, sacral vertebrae, caudal vertebrae, ribs, humeri, radius, femora, tibiae, fibula, ilia, ischia, and ossified tendons.	Possibly represents a junior synonym of Pentaceratops, holotype may possibly have come from the Kirtland Formation.	Parasaurolophus Pentaceratops Stegoceras Titanoceratops

=== Saurischians ===
Some remains (OMNH 10131) of Bistahieversor may actually have originated in the upper Fruitland Formation.

Saurischians of the Fruitland Formation
Genus	Species	Member	Abundance	Notes	Images
Bistahieversor	B. sealeyi	Fossil Forest	A rostral ramus of a lacrimal, and a partial skull and postcranial skeleton of an adult individual.	A eutyrannosaur tyrannosauroid also known from the Kirtland Formation.	Bistahieversor Ornithomimus
Dromaeosauridae	Indeterminate	Fossil Forest	Numerous isolated teeth.	Indeterminate dromaeosaurid remains.	Bistahieversor Ornithomimus
Ornithomimidae	Indeterminate	Fossil Forest	Distal end of metatarsals, distal end of a phalanx, and foot-bone fragments.	Indeterminate ornithomimid ornithomimosaur remains.	Bistahieversor Ornithomimus
cf. Ornithomimus	cf. O edmontonicus	Fossil Forest	A manual ungual.	Material possibly referable to Ornithomimus.	Bistahieversor Ornithomimus
?Troodontidae	Indeterminate	Fossil Forest	Isolated teeth.	Formerly identified as Paronychodon sp., referral to Troodontidae doubtful.	Bistahieversor Ornithomimus

Color key: Taxon / Reclassified taxon / Taxon falsely reported as present / Dubious taxon or junior synonym / Ichnotaxon / Ootaxon / Morphotaxon

Notes
Uncertain or tentative taxa are in small text
~~crossed out~~ taxa are discredited.

== Economic geology ==
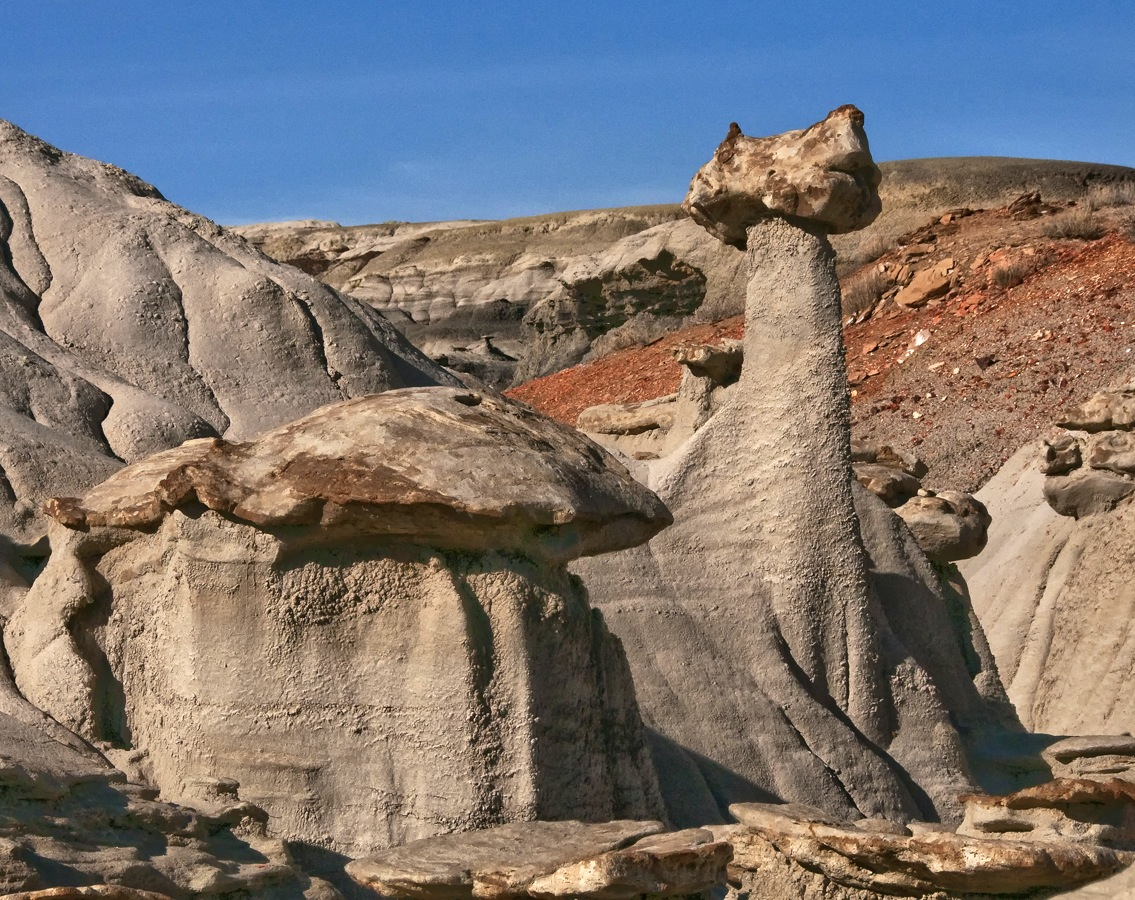
Fruitland Formation at the Bisti Wilderness

The Fruitland Formation contains beds of bituminous coal that are mined in places along the outcrop. Original reserves of coal in the formation have been estimated at 200 billion tons.

Since the 1980s, the coal beds of the Fruitland Formation have yielded large quantities of coalbed methane. The productive area for coalbed methane straddles the Colorado-New Mexico state line, and is one of the most productive areas for coalbed methane in the United States. The methane released from the Fruitland Formation, through oil and gas production and a bit of natural seepage, contributes to the Four Corners Methane Hot Spot.

== See also ==
- List of stratigraphic units with dinosaur body fossils
- List of fossiliferous stratigraphic units in Colorado
- List of fossiliferous stratigraphic units in New Mexico
