= Pictured Cliffs Formation =

Geologic formation in New Mexico and Colorado

- Stratigraphic range: Campanian
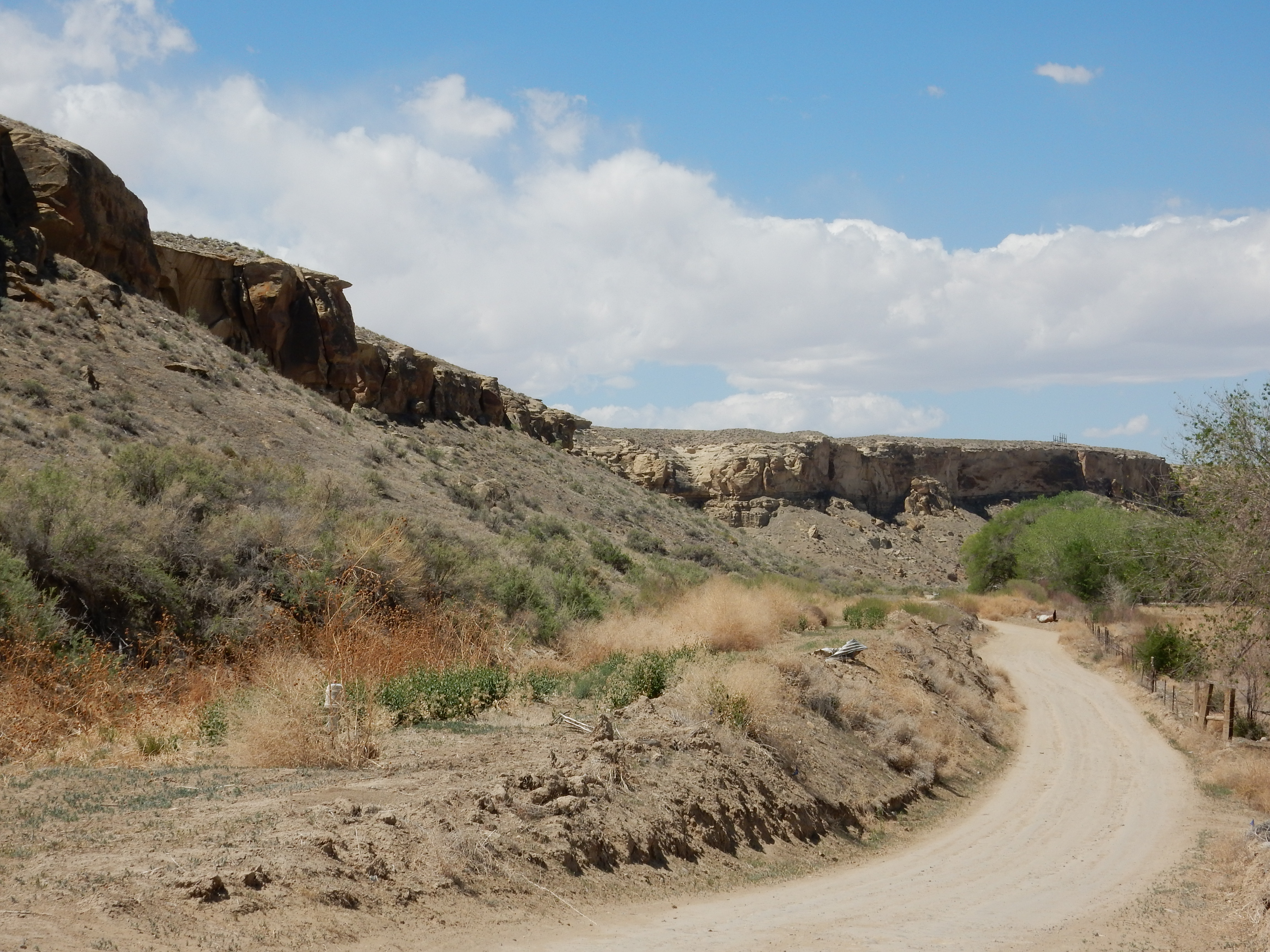
- Pictured Cliffs Formation at its type location near Fruitland, New Mexico
- Type: Geological formation
- Underlies: Fruitland Formation
- Overlies: Lewis Shale
- Thickness: 60 feet (18 m)

Lithology
- Primary: Sandstone

Location
- Coordinates: 36.7373°N 108.4277°W
- Region: New Mexico
- Country: United States

Type section
- Named for: Pictured Cliffs of the San Juan River
- Named by: W.H. Holmes
- Year defined: 1877
- Pictured Cliffs Formation (the United States) Pictured Cliffs Formation (New Mexico)

The Pictured Cliffs Formation is a Campanian geologic formation in the San Juan Basin of New Mexico. Dinosaur remains are among the fossils that have been recovered from the formation, although none have yet been referred to a specific genus.

== Description ==
The formation consists of yellowish-gray to grayish-orange cliff-forming sandstone. The upper beds are massive and crossbedded, consisting of well-sorted, fine-grained, friable sandstone. The lower beds are alternating thin beds of sandstone and light- to dark-gray silty shale. The upper part of the shale beds contains up to 6.5 feet (2.0 m) of discontinuous ironstone beds. The total thickness is about 60 feet (18 m). The formation is transitional with both the underlying Lewis Shale and the overlying Fruitland Formation.

The formation is interpreted as a marine littoral formation deposited during the final regression of the Western Interior Seaway from the San Juan Basin, with recognizable delta-front and barrier island facies. The regression was interrupted by at least three brief transgressions that produced tongues of the upper Pictured Cliff Sandstone in the northern San Juan Basin.

== Fossils ==
The formation contains fossil marine invertebrates and trace fossil Ophiomorpha major, typical of a nearshore marine environment.

== Economic geology ==
The formation serves as a reservoir rock for natural gas. Production by 1988 amounted to 87.7 × 10^{9} cubic meters with remaining reserves estimated at that time as 127.4 × 10^{9} cubic meters. The gas likely originated both in the underlying Lewis Shale and the coal beds of the overlying Fruitland Formation.

== History of investigation ==
The formation was first described as the Pictured Cliffs group or Pictured Cliffs sandstone by W.H. Holmes in 1877.

== See also ==
- List of dinosaur-bearing rock formations
  - List of stratigraphic units with indeterminate dinosaur fossils
