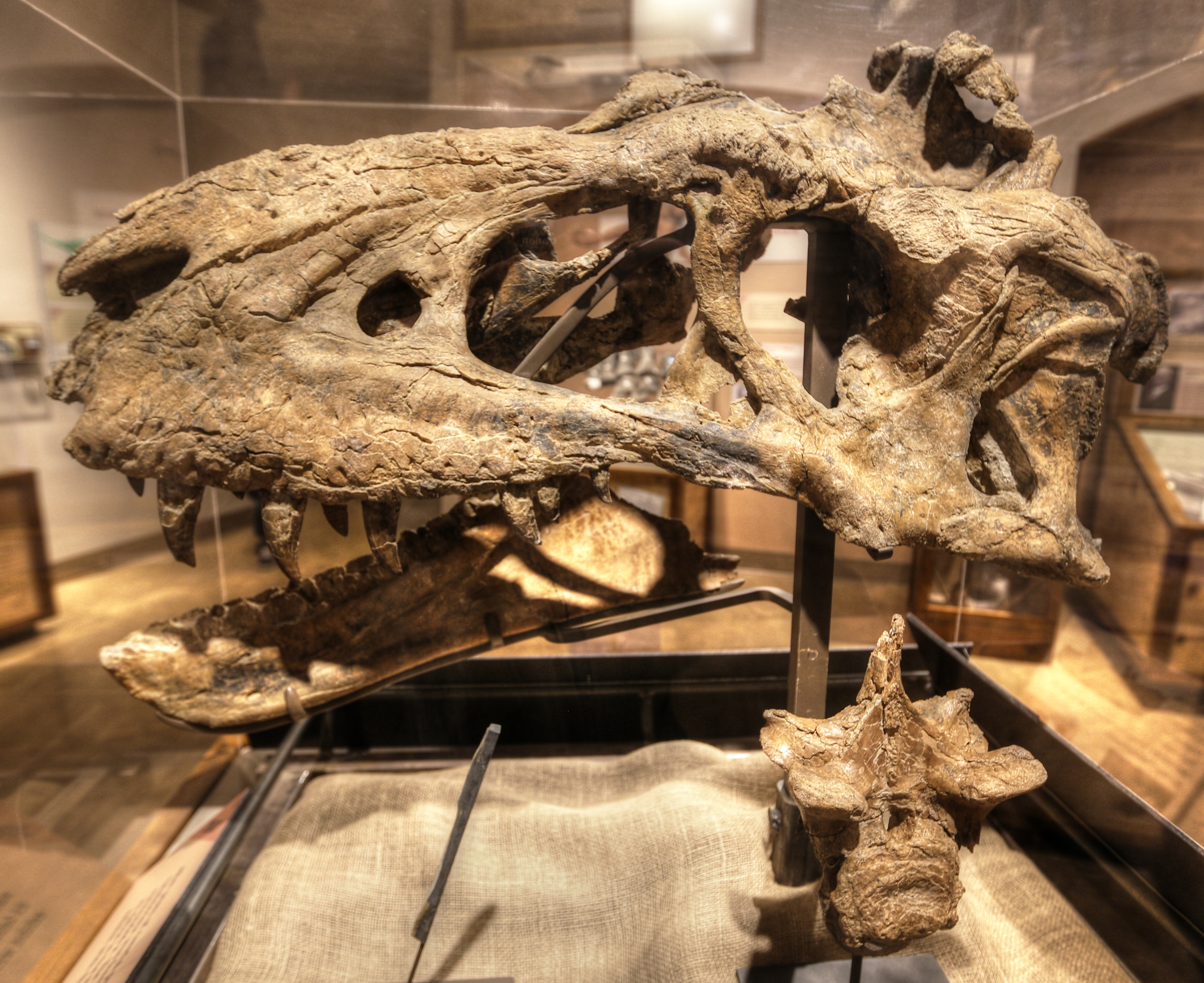
- Skull and vertebra at the New Mexico Museum of Natural History and Science

Scientific classification
- Kingdom: Animalia
- Phylum: Chordata
- Class: Reptilia
- Clade: Dinosauria
- Clade: Saurischia
- Clade: Theropoda
- Superfamily: †Tyrannosauroidea
- Clade: †Eutyrannosauria
- Genus: †Bistahieversor; Carr & Williamson, 2010
- Species: †B. sealeyi

Binomial name
- †Bistahieversor sealeyi Carr & Williamson, 2010

= Bistahieversor =

Bistahieversor Temporal range: Late Cretaceous, 75.5–74.5 Ma

Extinct genus of dinosaurs

Bistahieversor (meaning "Bistahi destroyer"), also known as the "Bisti Beast", is a genus of eutyrannosaurian theropod dinosaur, closely related to tyrannosaurids if not one. The genus contains only a single known species, B. sealeyi, described in 2010, from the Late Cretaceous of New Mexico. The holotype and a juvenile were found in the Hunter Wash Member of the Kirtland Formation, while other specimens came from the underlying Fossil Forest member of the Fruitland Formation. This dates Bistahieversor approximately 75.5 to 74.5 million years ago during the Campanian age, found in sediments spanning a million years.

== Discovery and naming ==
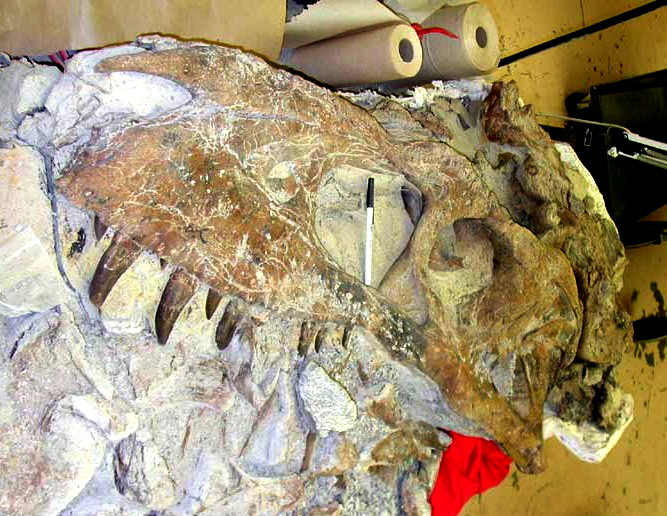
Holotype skull during preparation

The first remains now attributed to Bistahieversor, a partial skull and skeleton, were described in 1990 as a specimen of Aublysodon. Additional remains, consisting of the incomplete skull and skeleton of a juvenile, were described in 1992. Another complete skull and partial skeleton were found in the Bisti/De-Na-Zin Wilderness Area of New Mexico in 1998, known colloquially as the "Bisti Beast".

In a 2000 paper, Thomas Carr and Thomas Williamson re-examined these four specimens and suggested that they did not belong to Aublysodon, but rather to one or more new species of Daspletosaurus. However, it was not until 2010 that Carr and Williamson published a thorough re-description of the specimens and found that they belonged to a new genus and species of more generalized tyrannosauroid. They named it Bistahieversor sealeyi. The name Bistahieversor comes from the Navajo Bistahí, or "place of the adobe formations" in reference to the Bisti/De-Na-Zin Wilderness Area where it was found. Eversor, the latter part of the name, means "destroyer" in Latin.

== Description ==
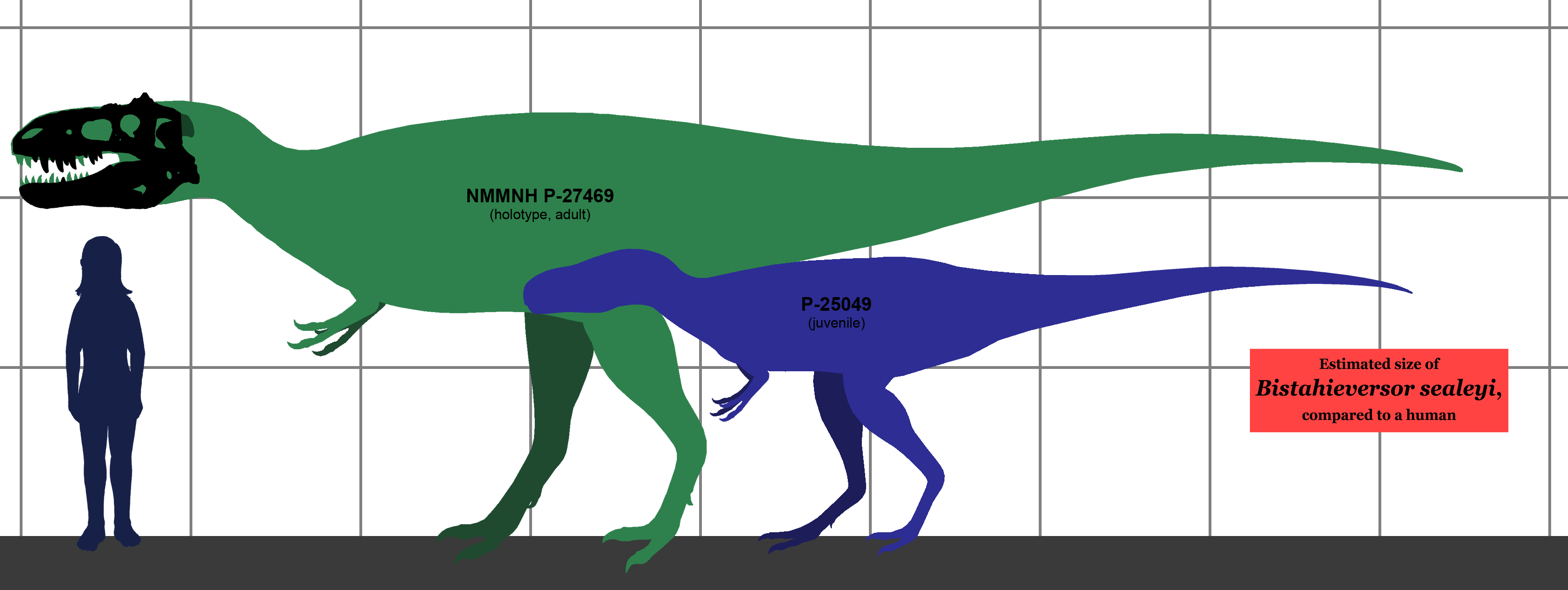
Size comparison with a juvenile

Material from both juveniles and adults has been found in the Kirtland and Fruitland formations of New Mexico. Adult Bistahieversor are estimated to have been around 9 meters (30 ft) long and weigh at least a ton. The snout is deep, indicating that the feature is not unique to more derived tyrannosaurs, such as Tyrannosaurus. Geographical barriers, such as the newly forming Rocky Mountains, may have isolated the more southerly Bistahieversor from more derived northern tyrannosaurs. In 2010, Gregory S. Paul estimated a length of 8 meters (26 ft) and a weight of 2.5 metric tons (2.75 short tons). In 2016, Molina-Pérez and Larramendi gave a length of 9 meters (29.5 ft) and a weight of 3.3 metric tons (3.6 short tons).

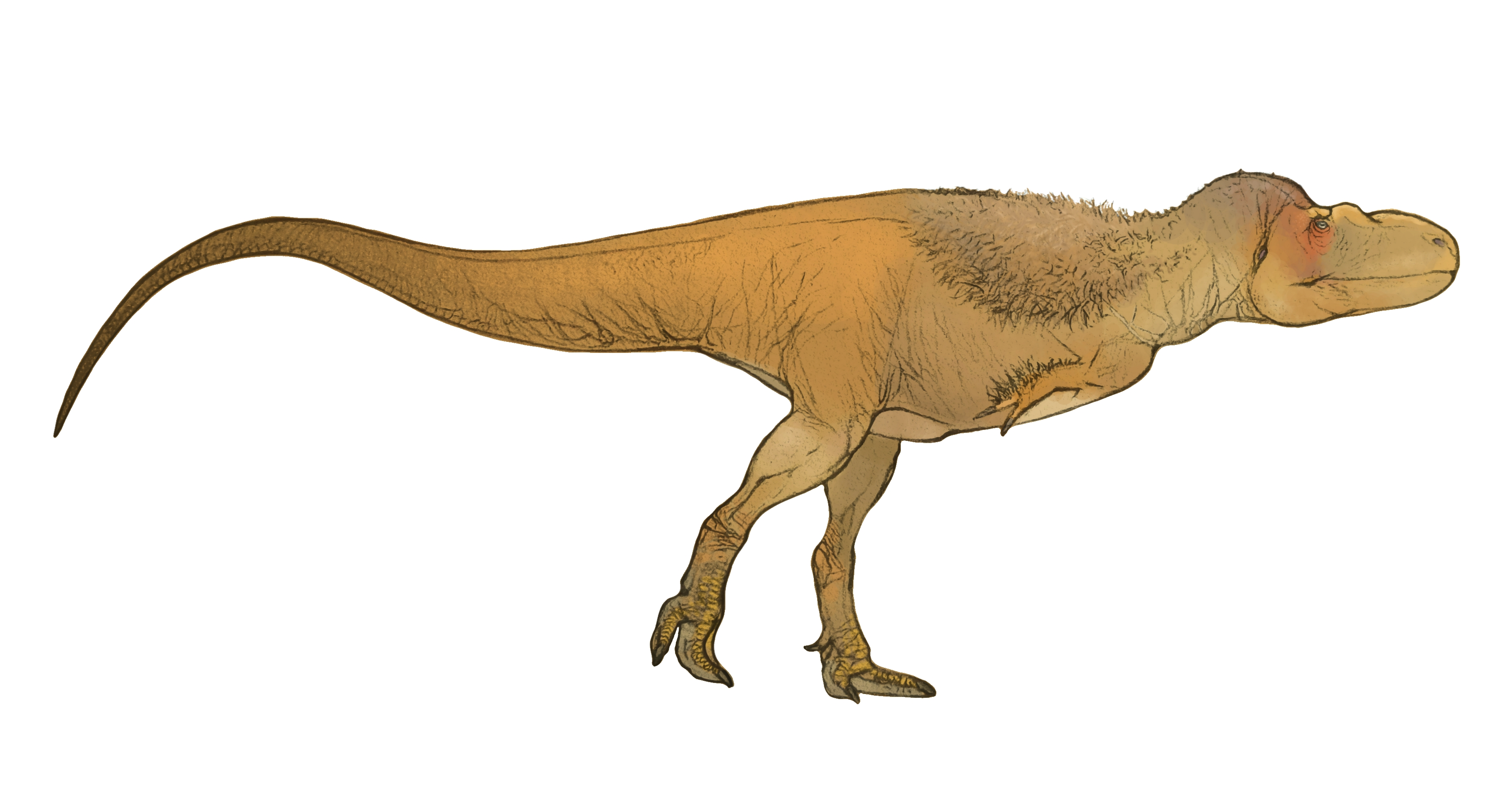
Life restoration

Bistahieversor differs from other tyrannosaurs in the possession of 64 teeth, an extra opening above the eye, and a keel along the lower jaw, among many other unique traits. The opening above the eye is thought to have accommodated an air sac that would have lightened the skull's weight. Bistahieversor also had a complex joint at its "forehead" that would have stabilized the skull to prevent movement at the joint.

== Classification ==
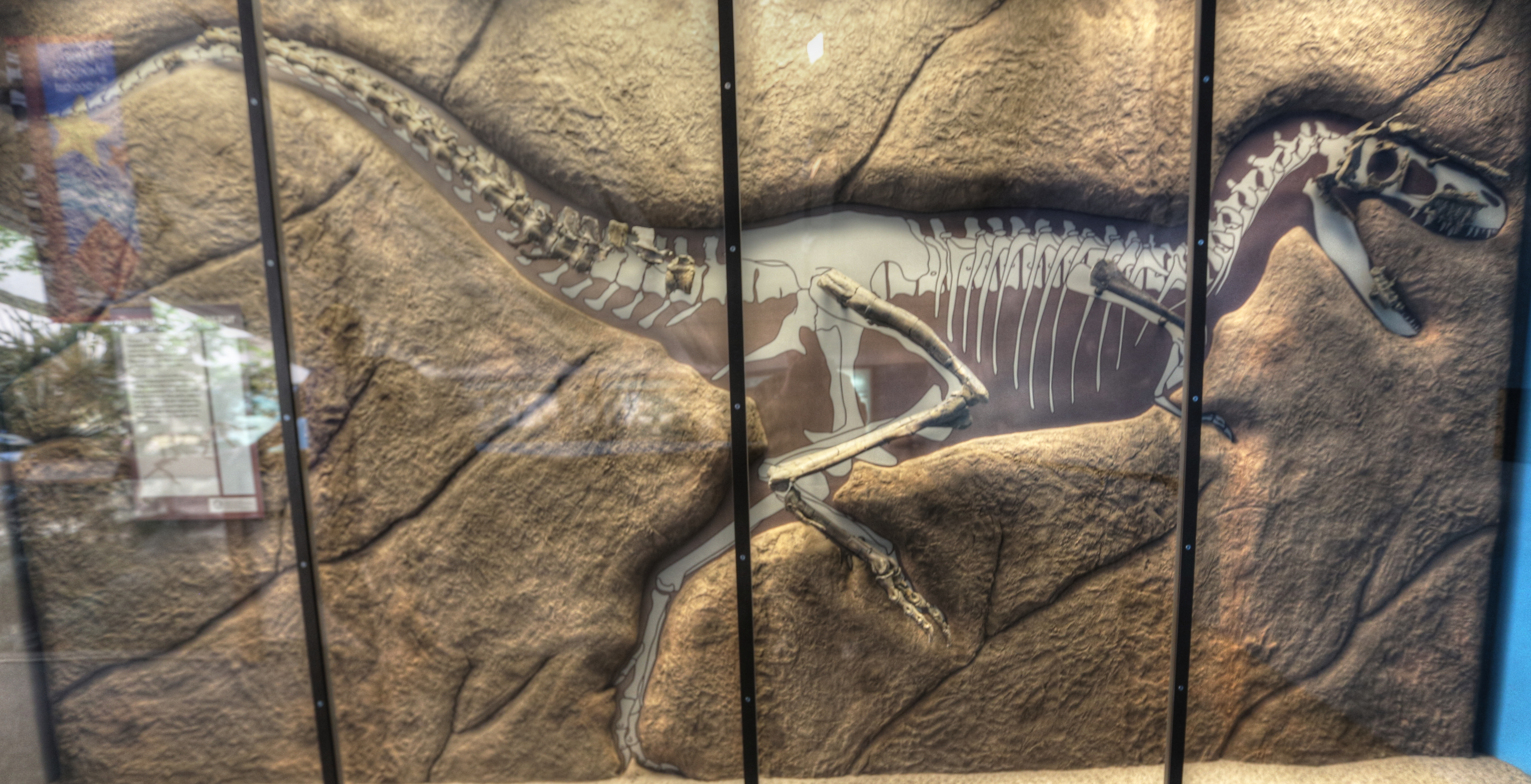
Wall-mounted juvenile

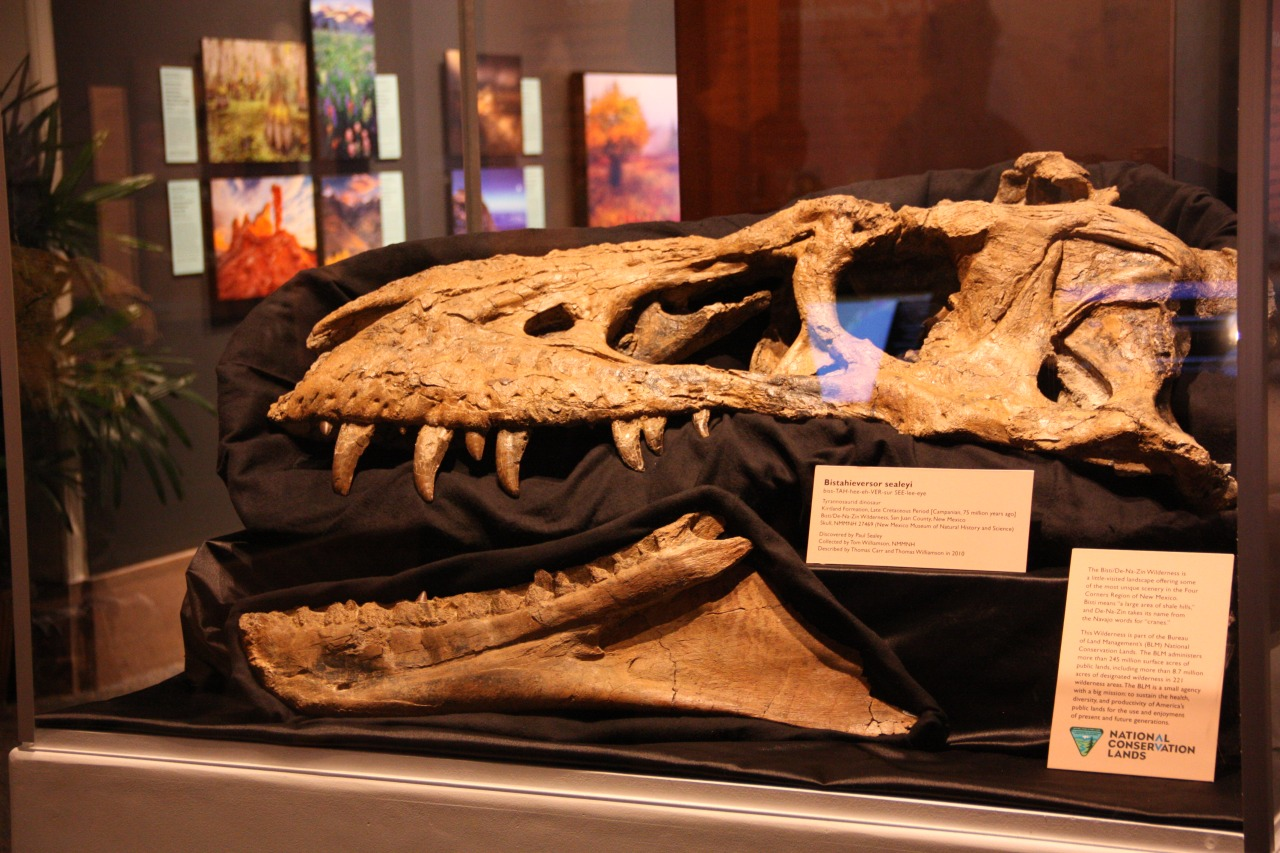
Holotype skull exhibited at the Smithsonian Museum

Bistahieversor is a genus of derived tyrannosaur often classified in the subfamily Tyrannosaurinae. Different datasets have recovered varying placements for it within Eutyrannosauria.

In 2020, Voris et al. recovered Bistahieversor as a basal member of Eutyrannosauria, rather than a tyrannosaurine, diverging later than Dryptosaurus and Appalachiosaurus. These results are displayed in the cladogram below:

- Eutyrannosauria
  - - Dryptosaurus aquilunguis
    - - Appalachiosaurus montgomeriensis
      - - Bistahieversor sealeyi
        - - Tyrannosauridae
            - Albertosaurinae
              - Gorgosaurus libratus
              - Albertosaurus sarcophagus
            - Tyrannosaurinae
              - Alioramini
                - Qianzhousaurus sinensis
                - - Alioramus remotus
                  - Alioramus altai
              - - - Teratophoneus curriei
                  - Dynamoterror dynastes
                  - Lythronax argestes
                - - Nanuqsaurus hoglundi
                  - - - Daspletosaurini
                        - Thanatotheristes degrootorum
                        - - Daspletosaurus torosus
                          - Daspletosaurus horneri
                      - - Zhuchengtyrannus magnus
                        - - Tarbosaurus bataar
                          - Tyrannosaurus rex

In 2024, Rivera-Sylva & Longrich described new remains likely belonging to a novel species of Labocania. Their new data allowed for the reanalysis of Bistahieversor as a member of the tyrannosaurine clade Teratophoneini, in addition to Labocania, Dynamoterror, Teratophoneus, and two unnamed specimens from the Aguja and Two Medicine formations. Their results are displayed in the cladogram below:

- - Alioramini
  - Tyrannosauridae
    - Nanotyrannus
    - - Albertosaurinae
      - Tyrannosaurinae
        - Asiatyrannus
        - - Daspletosaurini
          - - Lythronax
            - - - Nanuqsaurus
                - Tyrannosaurini
                  - Tyrannosaurus spp.
                  - - Tarbosaurus
                    - Zhuchengtyrannus
              - Teratophoneini
                - Dynamoterror
                - Teratophoneus
                - - Aguja Fm. tyrannosaurine
                  - Bistahieversor
                  - Two Medicine Fm. tyrannosaurine
                  - - Labocania anomala
                    - Labocania aguillonae

In their 2025 paper regarding the validity of Nanotyrannus, Zanno and Napoli consistently recovered Bistahieversor as a basal representative of Albertosaurinae alongside Jinbeisaurus.

== Paleobiology ==
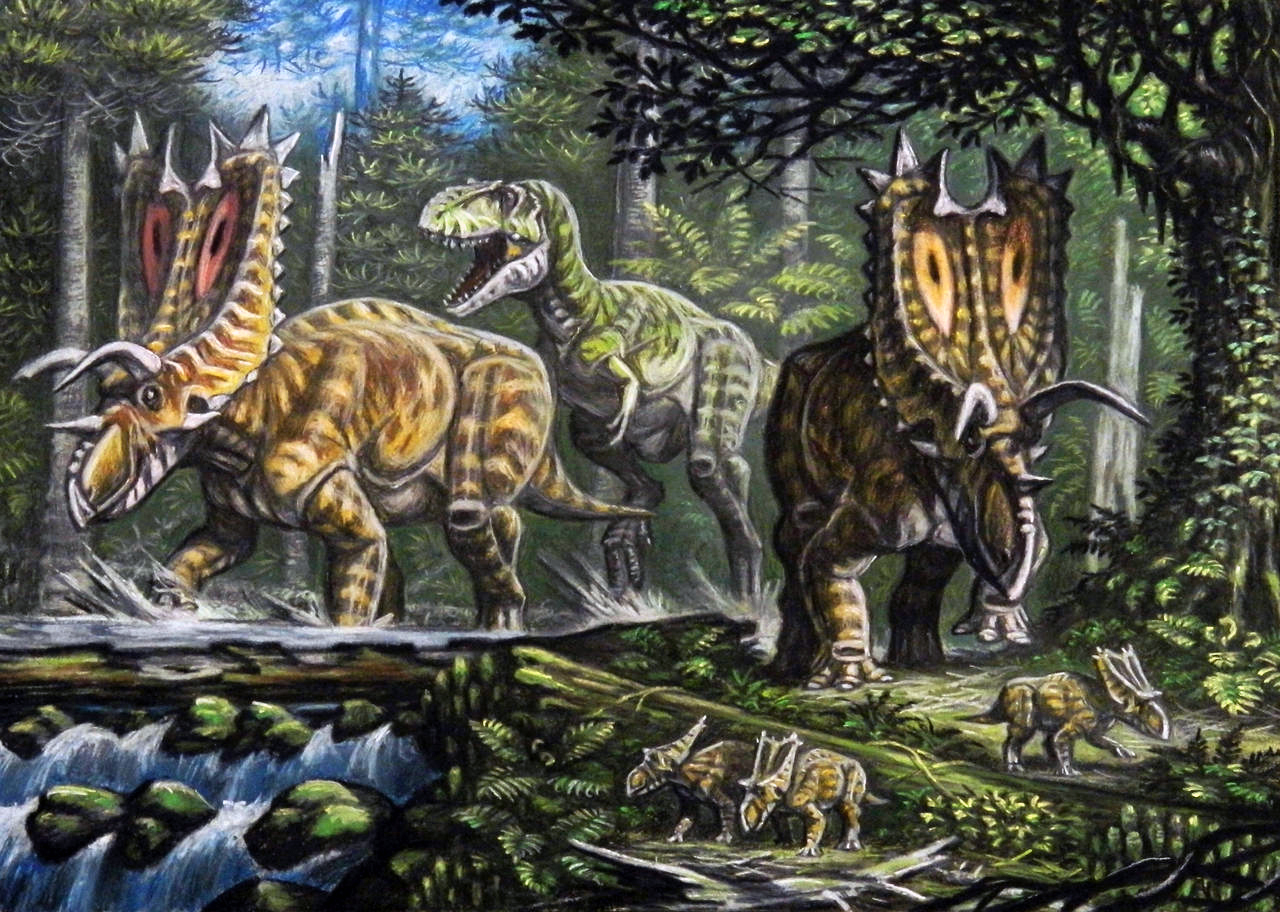
Restoration of Bistahieversor hunting Pentaceratops

A 2020 study of the endocranial morphology of Bistahieversor shed some light on its hunting behaviors. Its large olfactory bulbs indicate a very heightened sense of smell, while the elongated semi-circular canals implied increased agility and sophisticated gaze stabilization while the head was moving. Bistahieversor also possessed binocular vision, allowing it to see much better than more primitive predatory dinosaurs. The study noted that, while Bistahieversor had small optic lobes, this was not a strong indicator of whether or not this dinosaur possessed poor vision.

== See also ==
- 2010 in paleontology
- Timeline of tyrannosaur research
