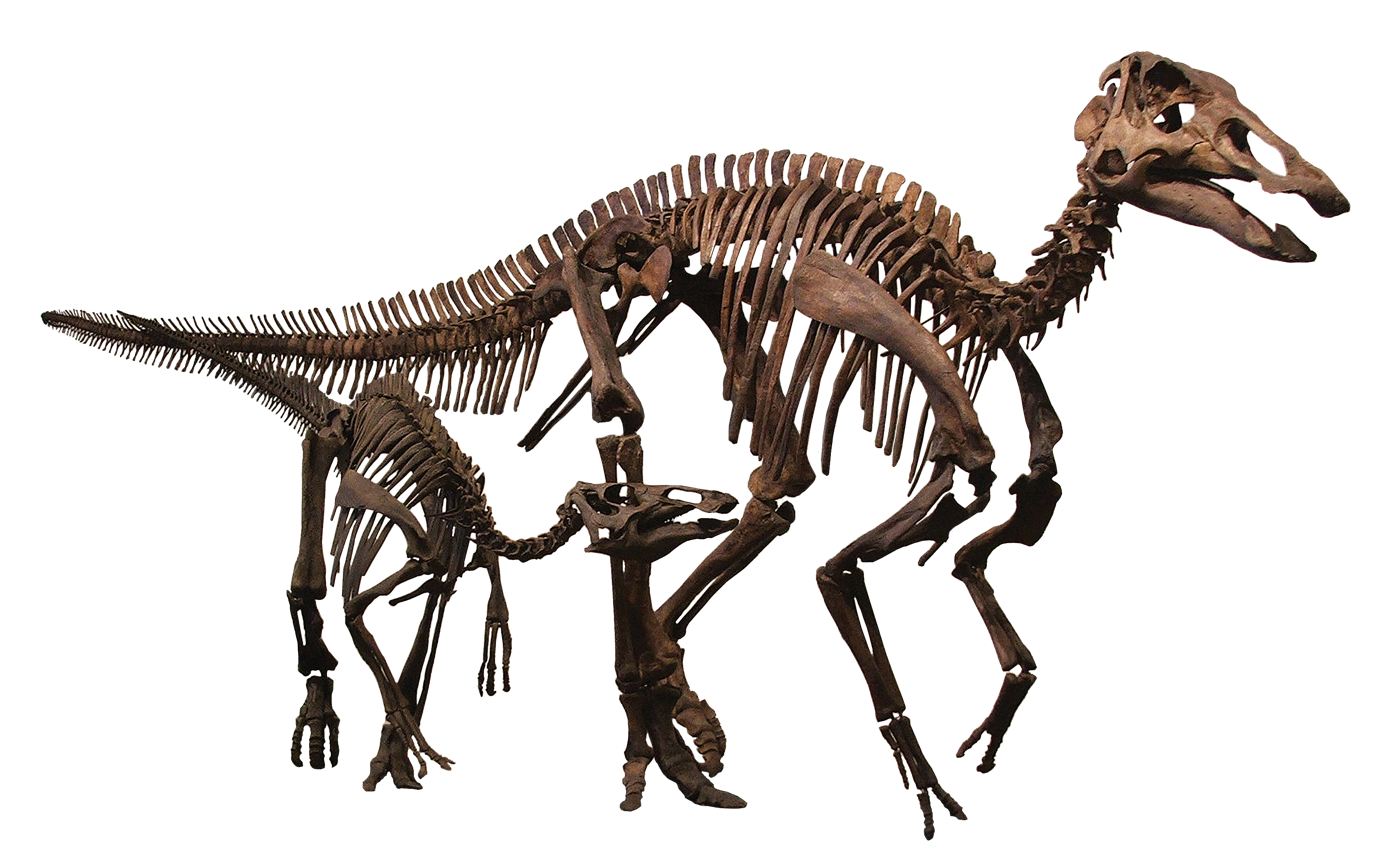
- Mounted cast of a fossil E. annectens skeleton, Rocky Mountain Dinosaur Resource Center

Scientific classification
- Kingdom: Animalia
- Phylum: Chordata
- Class: Reptilia
- Clade: Dinosauria
- Clade: †Ornithischia
- Clade: †Ornithopoda
- Family: †Hadrosauridae
- Subfamily: †Saurolophinae
- Tribe: †Edmontosaurini
- Genus: †Edmontosaurus; Lambe, 1917

Type species
- †Edmontosaurus regalis Lambe, 1917

Other species
- †E. annectens (Marsh, 1892)

Synonyms
- Anatosaurus Lull & Wright, 1942; Anatotitan Chapman & Brett-Surman, 1990; Claosaurus annectens Marsh, 1892; Ugrunaaluk? Mori et al., 2015

= Edmontosaurus =

Edmontosaurus Temporal range: Late Cretaceous (Campanian to end Maastrichtian), 73–66 Ma

Hadrosaurid dinosaur genus from Late Cretaceous US and Canada

Edmontosaurus (/ɛdˌmɒntəˈsɔːrəs/ ed-MON-tə-SOR-əs) (meaning "lizard from Edmonton"), often colloquially and historically known as Anatosaurus or Anatotitan (meaning "duck lizard" and "giant duck"), is a genus of hadrosaurid (duck-billed) dinosaur. It contains two known species: Edmontosaurus regalis and Edmontosaurus annectens. Fossils of E. regalis have been found in rocks of western North America that date from the late Campanian age of the Cretaceous period 73 million years ago, while those of E. annectens were found in the same geographic region from rocks dated to the end of the Maastrichtian age, 66 million years ago. Edmontosaurus lived alongside dinosaurs like Triceratops, Tyrannosaurus, Ankylosaurus, and Pachycephalosaurus shortly before the Cretaceous–Paleogene extinction event.

Edmontosaurus included two of the largest hadrosaurid species, with E. annectens measuring up to 12 metres (39 ft) in length and weighing around 5.6 metric tons (6.2 short tons) in average asymptotic body mass. The exceptionally large specimens of E. annectens measured around 15 metres (49 ft) long and weighed around 15.9 metric tons (17.5 short tons). Several well-preserved specimens are known that include numerous bones, as well as extensive skin impressions and possible gut contents. Edmontosaurus is classified as a genus of saurolophine (or hadrosaurine) hadrosaurid, a member of the group of hadrosaurids that lacked large, hollow crests and instead had smaller, solid crests or fleshy combs.

The first fossils named Edmontosaurus were discovered in southern Alberta (named after Edmonton, the capital city), in the Horseshoe Canyon Formation (formerly called the lower Edmonton Formation). The type species, E. regalis, was named by Lawrence Lambe in 1917, although several other species that are now classified in Edmontosaurus were named earlier. The best known of these is E. annectens, named by Othniel Charles Marsh in 1892. This species was originally known as a species of Claosaurus, known for many years as a species of Trachodon, and later known as Anatosaurus annectens. Anatosaurus, Anatotitan, and probably Ugrunaaluk are now generally regarded as synonyms of Edmontosaurus.

Edmontosaurus was widely distributed across western North America, ranging from Colorado to the northern slopes of Alaska. The distribution of Edmontosaurus fossils suggests that it preferred coasts and coastal plains. It was a herbivore that could move on both two legs and four. Because it is known from several bone beds, Edmontosaurus is thought to have lived in groups and may have been migratory as well. The wealth of fossils has allowed researchers to study its paleobiology in detail, including its brain, how it may have fed, and its injuries and pathologies, such as evidence for tyrannosaur attacks on a few specimens.

In an Edmontosaurus fossil, Tuinstra et al. (2025) made the first clear detection of actual original dinosaur organic material, showing the presence of ancient hydroxyproline (a building block of collagen) in the fossil, and refuting the hypothesis that organic matter present in fossils must be due to contamination.

== Discovery and history ==
=== Claosaurus annectens ===
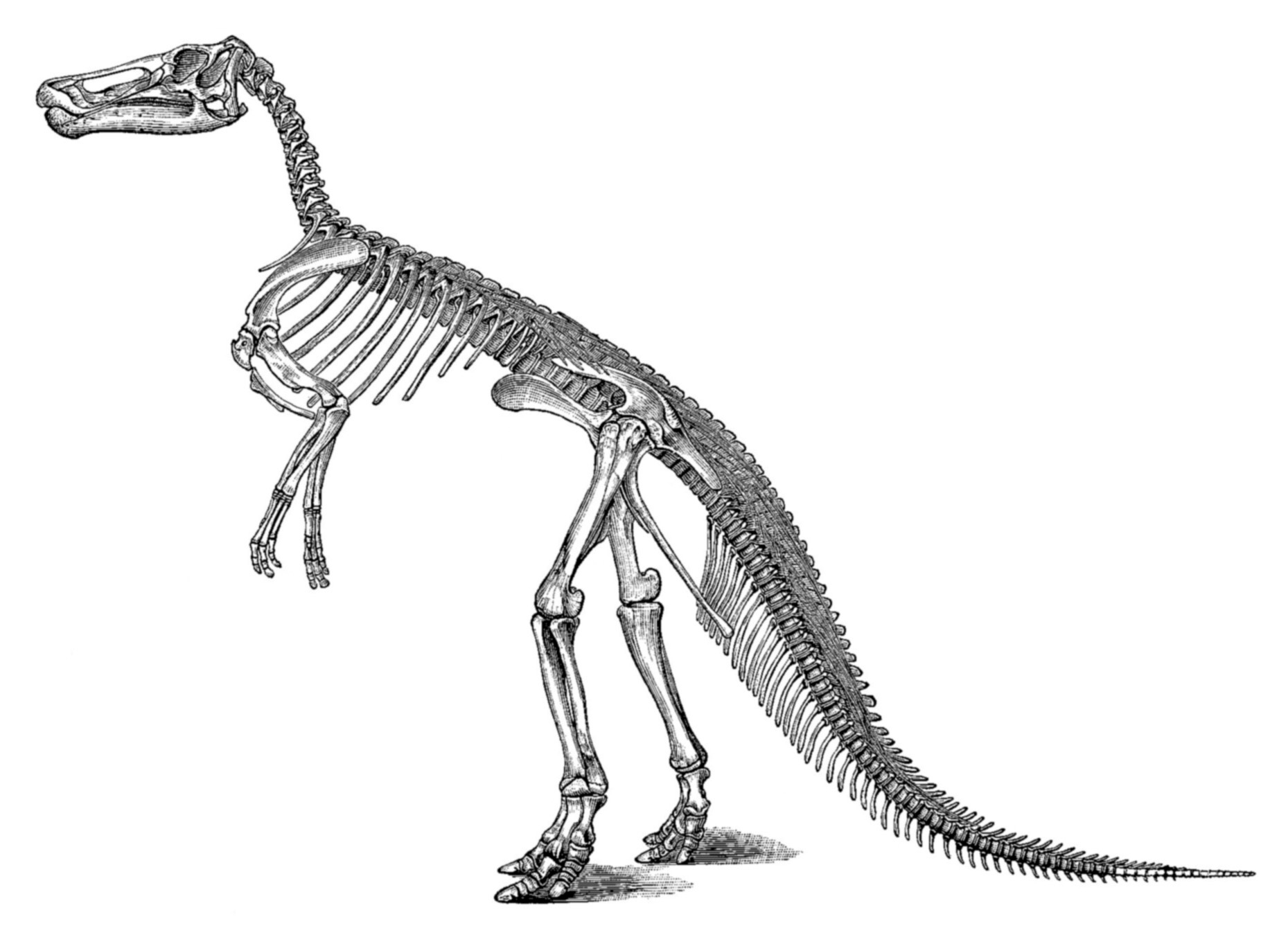
Skeletal restoration of the E. annectens (then Claosaurus) holotype, by Othniel Charles Marsh

Edmontosaurus has had a very long and complicated history in paleontology, having spent decades with various species classified in other genera. Its taxonomic history intertwines at various points with the genera Agathaumas, Anatosaurus, Anatotitan, Claosaurus, Hadrosaurus, Thespesius, and Trachodon, with references predating the 1980s typically using Anatosaurus, Claosaurus, Thespesius, or Trachodon for edmontosaur fossils (excluding those assigned to E. regalis) depending on the author and the date. Although Edmontosaurus was only named in 1917, its oldest well-supported species (E. annectens) was named in 1892 as a species of Claosaurus.

The first well-supported species of Edmontosaurus was named in 1892 as Claosaurus annectens by Othniel Charles Marsh. This species is based on USNM 2414, which is a partial skull-roof and skeleton, with a second skull and skeleton, YPM 2182, designated as the paratype. Both were collected in 1891 by John Bell Hatcher from the late Maastrichtian-age Upper Cretaceous Lance Formation of Niobrara County (then part of Converse County), Wyoming. This species has some historical footnotes attached, as it is among the first dinosaurs to receive a skeletal restoration and is the first hadrosaurid so restored. YPM 2182 and UNSM 2414 are, respectively, the first and second essentially complete mounted dinosaur skeletons in the United States. YPM 2182 was put on display in 1901 and USNM 2414 was put on display in 1904.

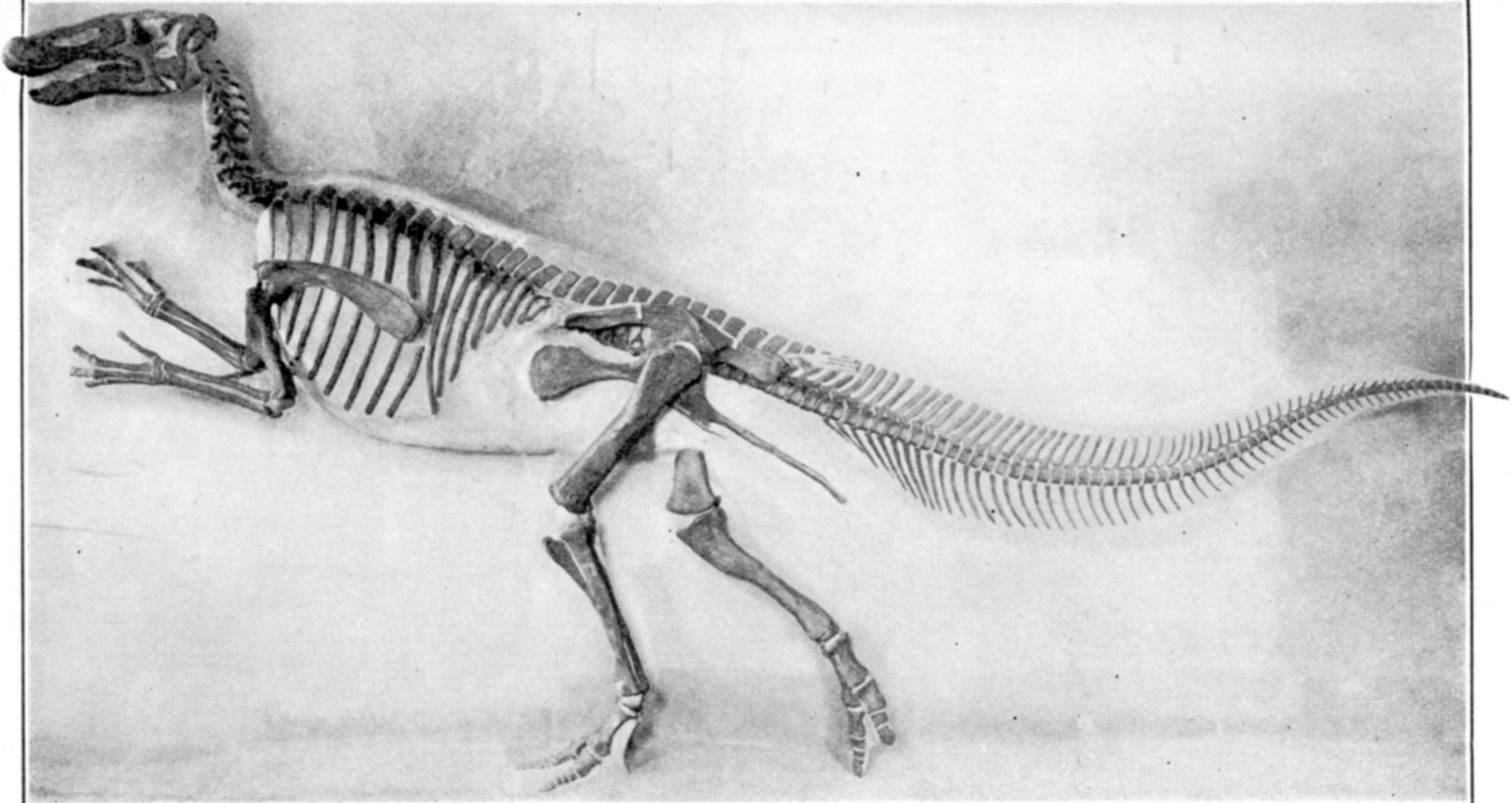
E. annectens paratype YPM 2182 at the Yale University Museum, the first nearly complete dinosaur skeleton mounted in the United States.

Because of the incomplete understanding of hadrosaurids at the time, following Marsh's death in 1897, Claosaurus annectens was variously classified as a species of Claosaurus, Thespesius or Trachodon. Opinions varied greatly, as textbooks and encyclopedias drew a distinction between the "Iguanodon-like" Claosaurus annectens and the "duck-billed" Hadrosaurus (based on remains now known as adult Edmontosaurus annectens), while Hatcher explicitly identified C. annectens as synonymous with the hadrosaurid represented by those same duck-billed skulls. Hatcher's revision, published in 1902, was sweeping, as he considered almost all hadrosaurid genera then known as synonyms of Trachodon. This included Cionodon, Diclonius, Hadrosaurus, Ornithotarsus, Pteropelyx, and Thespesius, as well as Claorhynchus and Polyonax, which are fragmentary genera now thought to be ceratopsians. Hatcher's work led to a brief consensus until post-1910, when new material from Canada and Montana showed a greater diversity of hadrosaurids than previously suspected. Charles W. Gilmore, in 1915, reassessed hadrosaurids and recommended that Thespesius be reintroduced for hadrosaurids from the Lance Formation and rock units of equivalent age and that Trachodon, based on inadequate material, should be restricted to a hadrosaurid from the older Judith River Formation and its equivalents. In regards to Claosaurus annectens, he recommended that it be considered the same as Thespesius occidentalis. His reinstatement of Thespesius for Lance-age hadrosaurids would have other consequences for the taxonomy of Edmontosaurus in the following decades.

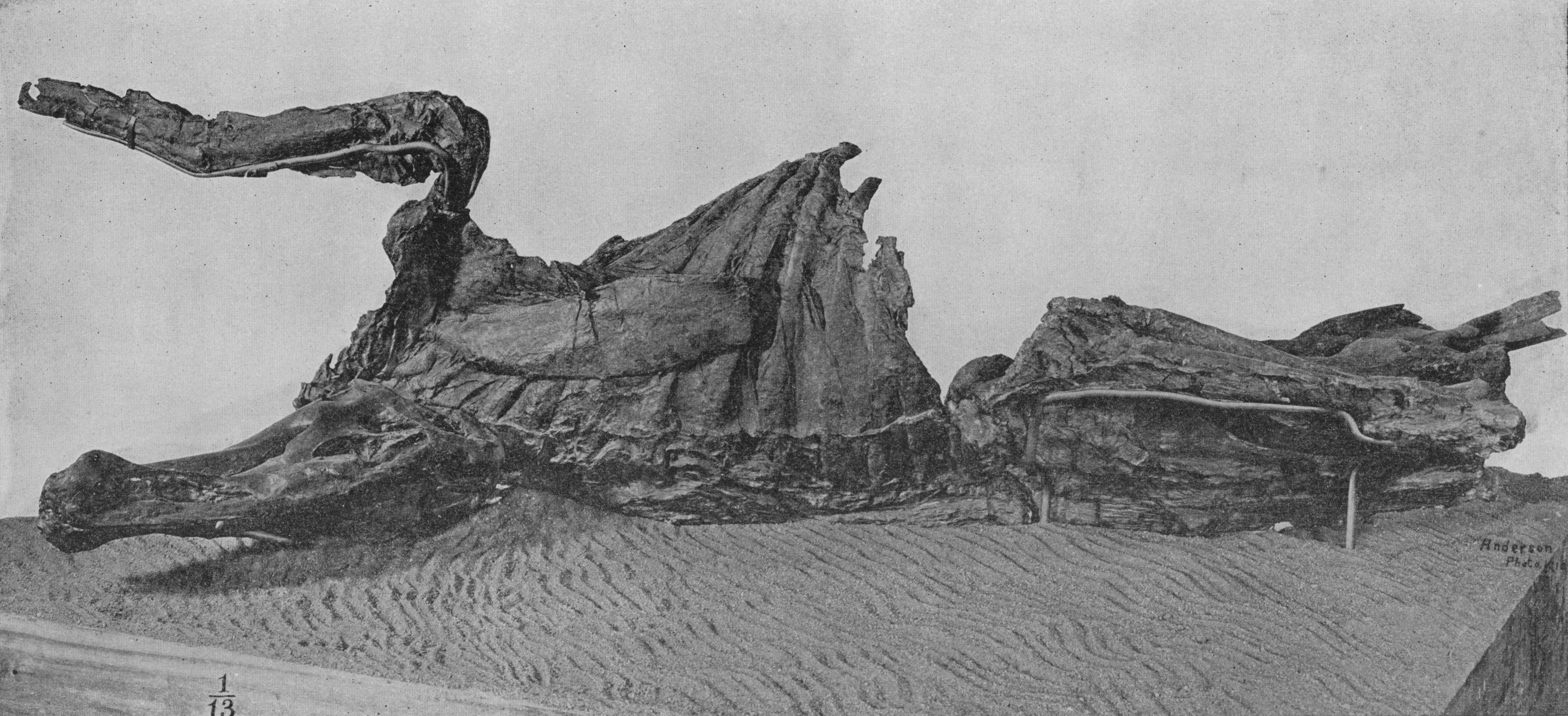
AMNH 5060: an E. annectens with skin impressions

During this time frame (1902–1915), two additional important specimens of C. annectens were recovered. The first, the "mummified" specimen AMNH 5060, was discovered in 1908 by Charles Hazelius Sternberg and his sons in Lance Formation rocks near Lusk, Wyoming. Sternberg was working for the British Museum of Natural History, but Henry Fairfield Osborn of the American Museum of Natural History was able to purchase the specimen for $2,000. The Sternbergs recovered a second similar specimen from the same area in 1910, which was not as well preserved. However, it was also found with skin impressions. They sold the specimen, SM 4036, to the Senckenberg Museum in Germany.

As a side note, Trachodon selwyni, described by Lawrence Lambe in 1902 for a lower jaw from what is now known as the Dinosaur Park Formation of Alberta, was erroneously described by Glut (1997) as having been assigned to Edmontosaurus regalis by Lull and Wright. It was not, instead being designated "of very doubtful validity." More recent reviews of hadrosaurids have concurred.

=== Canadian discoveries ===
Edmontosaurus itself was coined in 1917 by Lawrence Lambe for two partial skeletons found in the Horseshoe Canyon Formation (formerly the lower Edmonton Formation) along the Red Deer River of southern Alberta. These rocks are older than the rocks in which Claosaurus annectens was found. The Edmonton Formation lends Edmontosaurus its name. The type species, E. regalis (meaning 'regal', or, more loosely, 'king-sized'), is based on NMC 2288, which consists of a skull, articulated vertebrae up to the sixth tail vertebra, ribs, partial hips, an upper arm bone, and most of a leg. It was discovered in 1912 by Levi Sternberg. The second specimen, paratype NMC 2289, consists of a skull and skeleton lacking the beak, most of the tail, and part of the feet. It was discovered in 1916 by George F. Sternberg. Lambe found that his new dinosaur compared best to Diclonius mirabilis (specimens now assigned to Edmontosaurus annectens) and drew attention to the size and robustness of Edmontosaurus. Initially, Lambe only described the skulls of the two skeletons, but returned to the genus in 1920 to describe the skeleton of NMC 2289. The postcrania of the type specimen remains undescribed, still in its plaster jackets to this day.

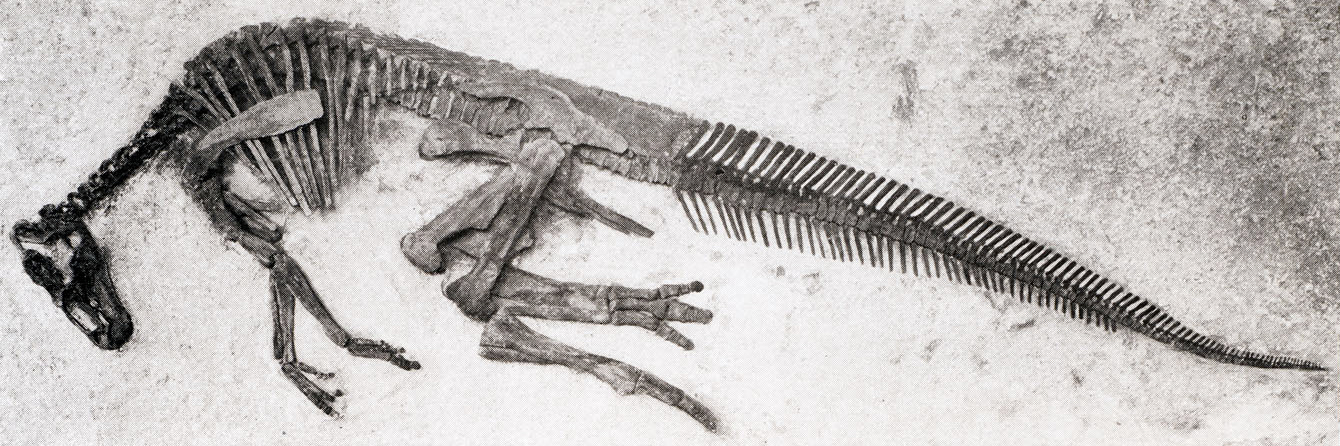
Specimen CMNFV 8399, holotype of E. edmontoni, now thought to be a young E. regalis.

Two more species that would come to be included with Edmontosaurus were named from Canadian remains in the 1920s, but both would initially be assigned to Thespesius. Gilmore named the first, Thespesius edmontoni, in 1924. T. edmontoni also came from the Horseshoe Canyon Formation. It was based on NMC 8399, another nearly complete skeleton lacking most of the tail. NMC 8399 was discovered on the Red Deer River in 1912 by a Sternberg party. Its arms, ossified tendons, and skin impressions were briefly described in 1913 and 1914 by Lambe, who at first thought it was an example of a species he had named Trachodon marginatus, but then changed his mind. The specimen became the first dinosaur skeleton to be mounted for exhibition in a Canadian museum. Gilmore found that his new species compared closely to what he called Thespesius annectens, but left the two apart because of details of the arms and hands. He also noted that his species had more vertebrae than Marsh's in the back and neck, but proposed that Marsh was mistaken in assuming that the annectens specimens were complete in those regions.

In 1926, Charles Mortram Sternberg named Thespesius saskatchewanensis for NMC 8509, which is a skull and partial skeleton from the Wood Mountain plateau of southern Saskatchewan. He had collected this specimen in 1921 from rocks that were assigned to the Lance Formation, now the Frenchman Formation. NMC 8509 included an almost complete skull, numerous vertebrae, partial shoulder and hip girdles, and partial legs, representing the first substantial dinosaur specimen recovered from Saskatchewan. Sternberg opted to assign it to Thespesius because that was the only hadrosaurid genus known from the Lance Formation at the time. At the time, T. saskatchewanensis was unusual because of its small size, estimated at 7 to 7.3 metres (23 to 24 ft) in length.

=== Anatosaurus to the present ===
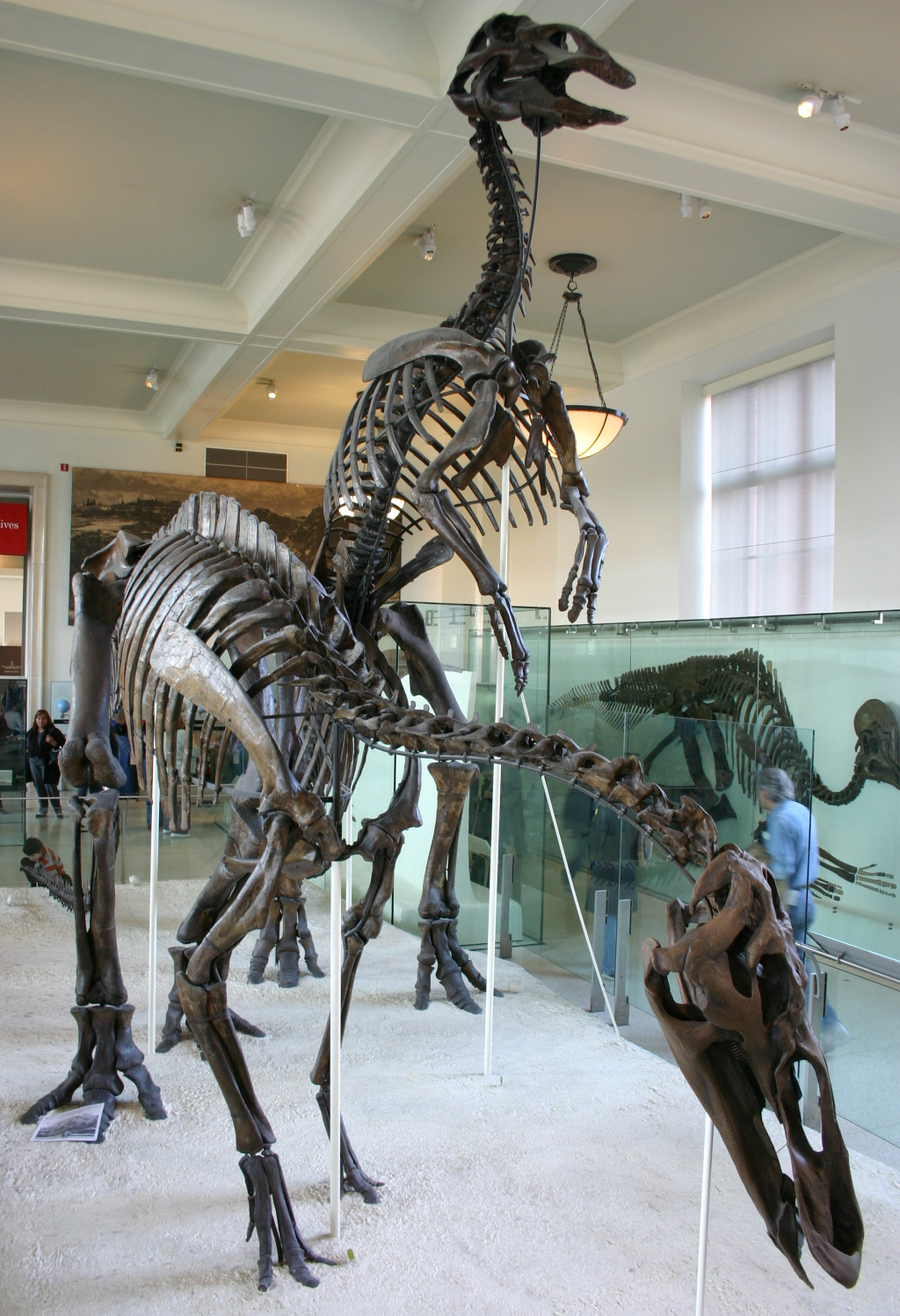
Outdated E. annectens skeleton mounts, formerly referred to Anatosaurus

In 1942, Lull and Wright attempted to resolve the complicated taxonomy of crestless hadrosaurids by naming a new genus, Anatosaurus, to take in several species that did not fit well under their previous genera. Anatosaurus, meaning 'duck lizard', because of its wide, duck-like beak (Latin anas 'duck' + Greek sauros 'lizard'), had as its type species Marsh's old Claosaurus annectens. Also assigned to this genus were Thespesius edmontoni, T. saskatchewanensis, a large lower jaw that Marsh had named Trachodon longiceps in 1890, and a new species named Anatosaurus copei for two skeletons on display at the American Museum of Natural History that had long been known as Diclonius mirabilis (or variations thereof). Thus, the various species became Anatosaurus annectens, A. copei, A. edmontoni, A. longiceps, and A. saskatchewanensis. Anatosaurus would come to be called the "classic duck-billed dinosaur."

This state of affairs persisted for several decades until Michael K. Brett-Surman reexamined the pertinent material for his graduate studies in the 1970s and 1980s. He concluded that the type species of Anatosaurus, A. annectens, was actually a species of Edmontosaurus and that A. copei was different enough to warrant its own genus. Although theses and dissertations are not regarded as official publications by the International Commission on Zoological Nomenclature, which regulates the naming of organisms, his conclusions were known to other paleontologists and were adopted by several popular works of the time. Brett-Surman and Ralph Chapman designated a new genus for A. copei (Anatotitan) in 1990. Of the remaining species, A. saskatchewanensis and A. edmontoni were assigned to Edmontosaurus as well and A. longiceps went to Anatotitan as either a second species or as a synonym of A. copei. Because the type species of Anatosaurus (A. annectens) was sunk into Edmontosaurus, the name Anatosaurus is abandoned as a junior synonym of Edmontosaurus.

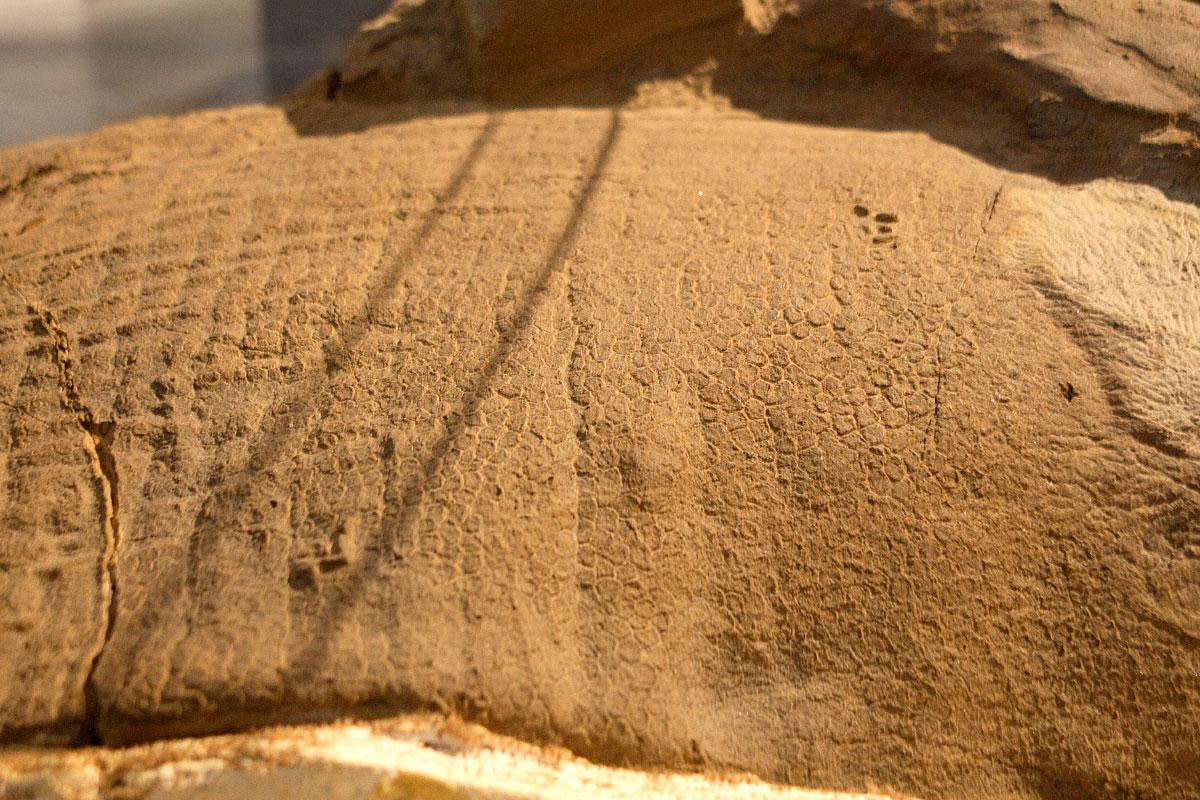
Skin impression of the specimen nicknamed "Dakota", which was found in 1999

The conception of Edmontosaurus that emerged included three valid species: the type species E. regalis, E. annectens (including Anatosaurus edmontoni, amended to edmontonensis), and E. saskatchewanensis. The debate about the proper taxonomy of the A. copei specimens continues to the present day. Returning to Hatcher's argument of 1902, Jack Horner, David B. Weishampel, and Catherine Forster regarded Anatotitan copei as representing specimens of Edmontosaurus annectens with crushed skulls. In 2007, another "mummy" was announced. Nicknamed "Dakota", it was discovered in 1999 by Tyler Lyson and came from the Hell Creek Formation of North Dakota.

In a 2011 study by Nicolás Campione and David Evans, the authors conducted the first ever morphometric analysis to compare the various specimens assigned to Edmontosaurus. They concluded that only two species are valid: E. regalis, from the late Campanian, and E. annectens, from the late Maastrichtian. Their study provided further evidence that Anatotitan copei is a synonym of E. annectens. Specifically, the long, low skull of A. copei is the result of ontogenetic change and represents mature E. annectens individuals.

== Species and distribution ==
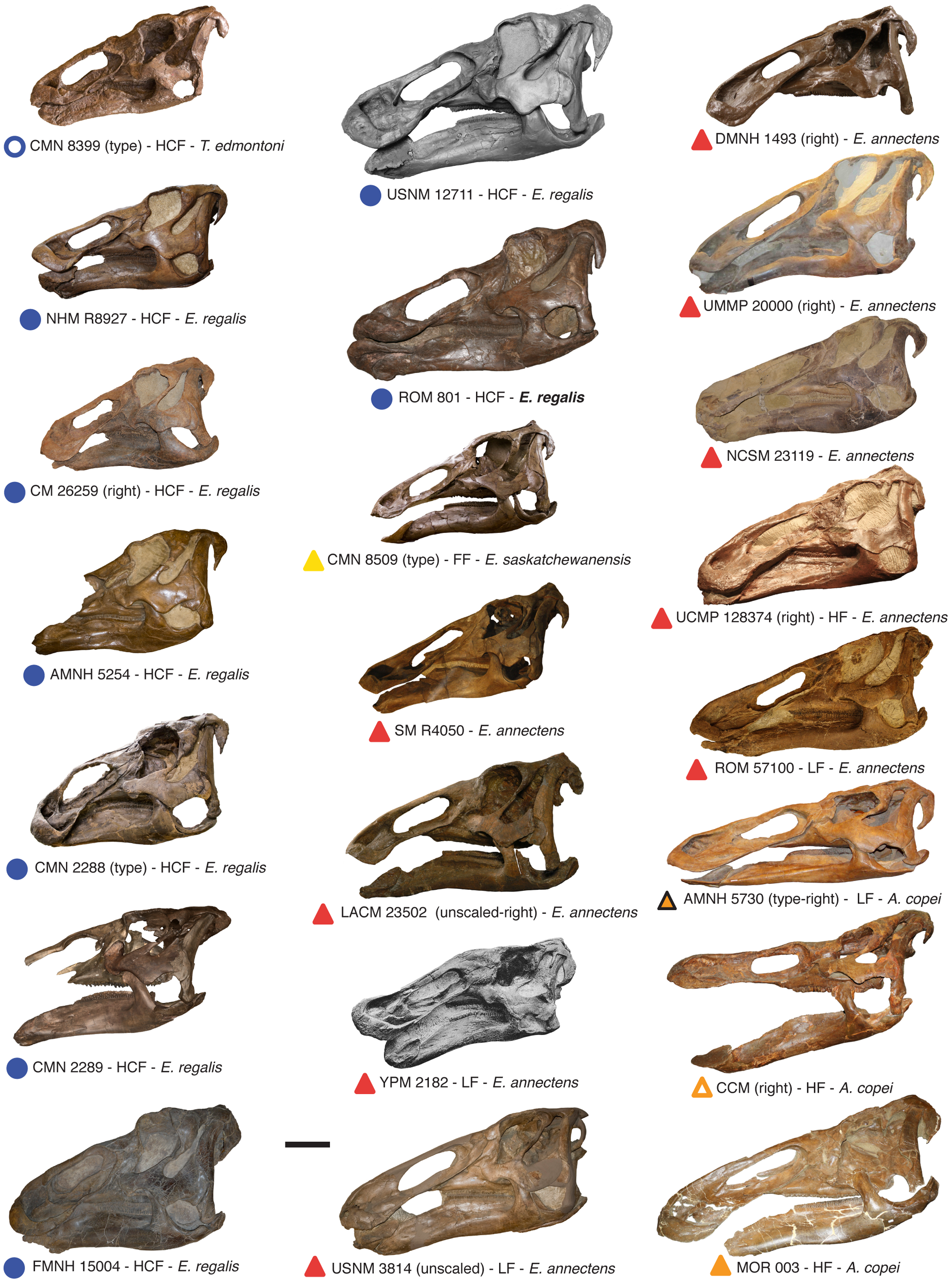
Most known complete Edmontosaurus annectens and Edmontosaurus regalis skulls.

Edmontosaurus is currently regarded as having two valid species: the type species E. regalis and E. annectens. E. regalis is known only from the Horseshoe Canyon Formation of Alberta, dating from the late Campanian age of the late Cretaceous period. At least a dozen individuals are known, including seven skulls with associated postcrania and five to seven other skulls. The species formerly known as Thespesius edmontoni or Anatosaurus edmontoni represents immature individuals of E. regalis.

E. annectens is known from the Frenchman Formation of Saskatchewan, the Hell Creek Formation of Montana, the Lance Formation of South Dakota and Wyoming and the Ferris Formation of Wyoming. It is limited to late Maastrichtian rocks and is represented by at least twenty skulls, some with postcranial remains. One author, Kraig Derstler, has described E. annectens as "perhaps the most perfectly-known dinosaur to date [1994]." Anatosaurus copei and E. saskatchewanensis are now thought to be growth stages of E. annectens, with A. copei as adults and E. saskatchewanensis as juveniles. Trachodon longiceps may be a synonym of E. annectens as well. Anatosaurus edmontoni was mistakenly listed as a synonym of E. annectens in both reviews of Dinosauria, but this does not appear to be the case.

Reconstruction of Edmontosaurus (skin pattern based on NDGS 2000)

E. annectens differed from E. regalis by having a longer, lower, and less robust skull. Although Brett-Surman regarded E. regalis and E. annectens as potentially representing males and females of the same species, all E. regalis specimens come from older formations than E. annectens specimens. Edmontosaurine specimens from the Prince Creek Formation of Alaska formerly assigned to Edmontosaurus sp. were given their own genus and species name, Ugrunaaluk kuukpikensis, in 2015. However, the identification of Ugrunaaluk as a separate genus was questioned by a 2017 study from Hai Xing and colleagues, who regarded it as a nomen dubium that was indistinguishable from other Edmontosaurus. In 2020, Ryuji Takasaki and colleagues agreed that the Prince Creek remains should be classified as Edmontosaurus, though species designation is unclear because the specimens are juveniles. Another study found the Alaskan material to be referable to Edmontosaurus cf. regalis based on craniomandibular anatomy. Edmontosaurus was also reported from the Javelina Formation of Big Bend National Park, western Texas based on TMM 41442-1, but was later referred to Kritosaurus cf. navajovius by Wagner (2001), before being assigned to Kritosaurus sp. by Lehman et al. (2016).

== Description ==
Edmontosaurus has been described in detail from numerous specimens. Traditionally, E. regalis has been regarded as the largest species, though this was challenged by the hypothesis that the larger hadrosaurid Anatotitan copei is a synonym of Edmontosaurus annectens, as put forward by Jack Horner and colleagues in 2004, and supported in studies by Campione and Evans in 2011.

=== Size ===
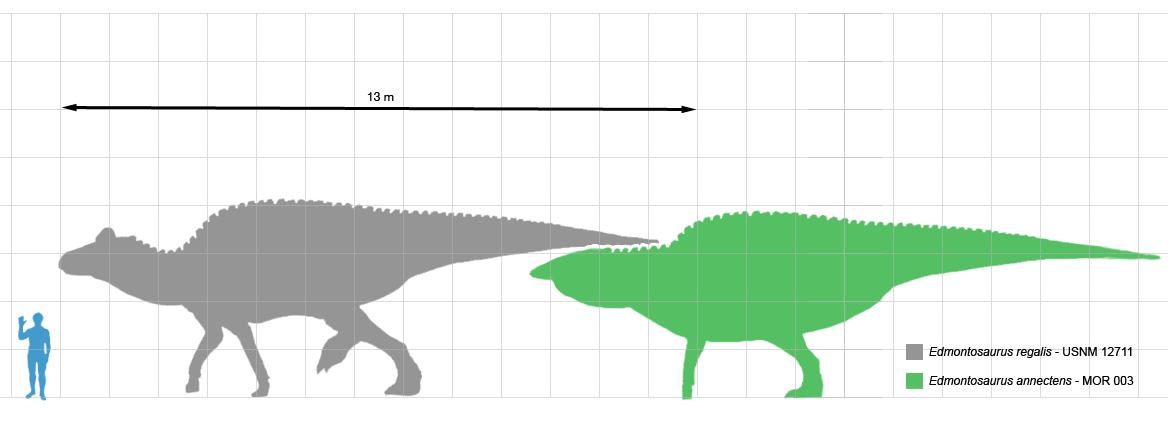
Scale diagram comparing large adult specimens of E. regalis (gray) and E. annectens (green) to a human

Edmontosaurus was among the largest hadrosaurids ever to exist. Like other hadrosaurids, it was a bulky animal with a long, laterally flattened tail and an expanded, duck-like beak. The arms were not as heavily built as the legs, but were long enough to be used for standing or for quadrupedal movement. Depending on the species, previous estimates suggested that a fully grown adult could have been 9–12 metres (30–39 ft) long and some of the larger specimens reached the range of 12–13 metres (39–43 ft) with a body mass on the order of 4 metric tons (4.4 short tons).

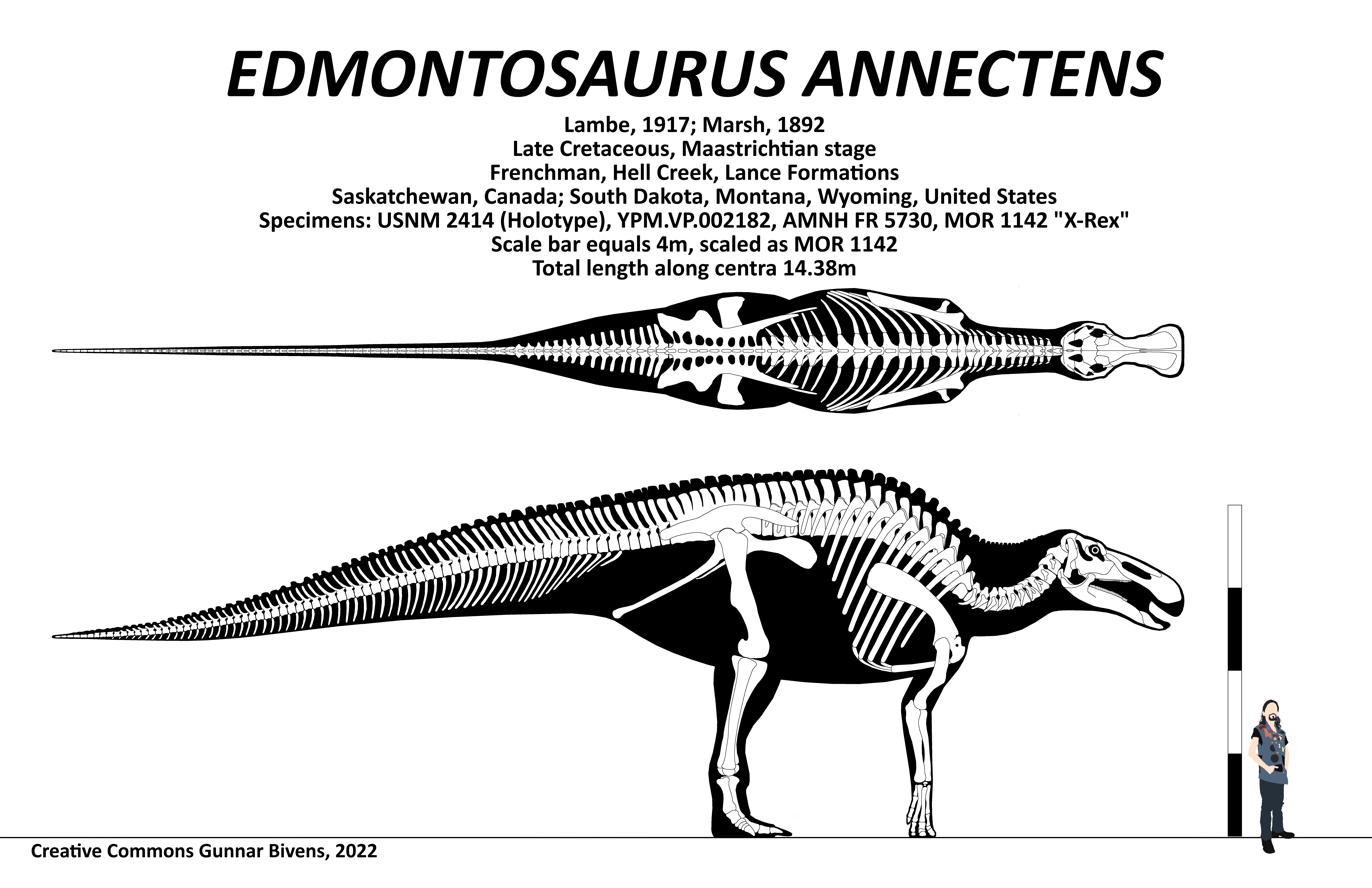
Multiview skeletal restoration of E. annectens.

E. annectens is often seen as smaller. Two mounted skeletons, USNM 2414 and YPM 2182, measure 8.00 metres (26.25 ft) long and 8.92 metres (29.3 ft) long, respectively. However, these are probably subadult individuals. There is also at least one report of a much larger potential E. annectens specimen that is almost 12 metres (39 ft) long. Two specimens still under study in the collection of the Museum of the Rockies - a 7.5 m (25 ft) tail labelled as MOR 1142 and another labelled as MOR 1609 - indicate that Edmontosaurus annectens could have grown to much larger sizes and reach nearly 15 metres (49 ft) in length, and weighed up to 15.87 metric tons (17.49 short tons), but such large individuals were likely very rare.

A 2022 study on the osteohistology and growth of E. annectens suggested that previous estimates might have underestimated or overestimated the size of this dinosaur and proposed that a fully grown adult E. annectens would have measured up to 11–12 metres (36–39 ft) in length and approximately 5.6 metric tons (6.2 short tons) in average asymptotic body mass, while the largest individuals measured more than 6 metric tons (6.6 short tons) and even up to 6.6–7 metric tons (7.3–7.7 short tons) when based on the comparison between various specimens of different sizes from the Ruth Mason Dinosaur Quarry and other specimens from different localities. According to this analysis, E. regalis may have been heavier, but not enough samples exist to provide a valid estimate and examination on its osteohistology and growth, so the results for E. regalis aren't statistically significant.

=== Skull ===
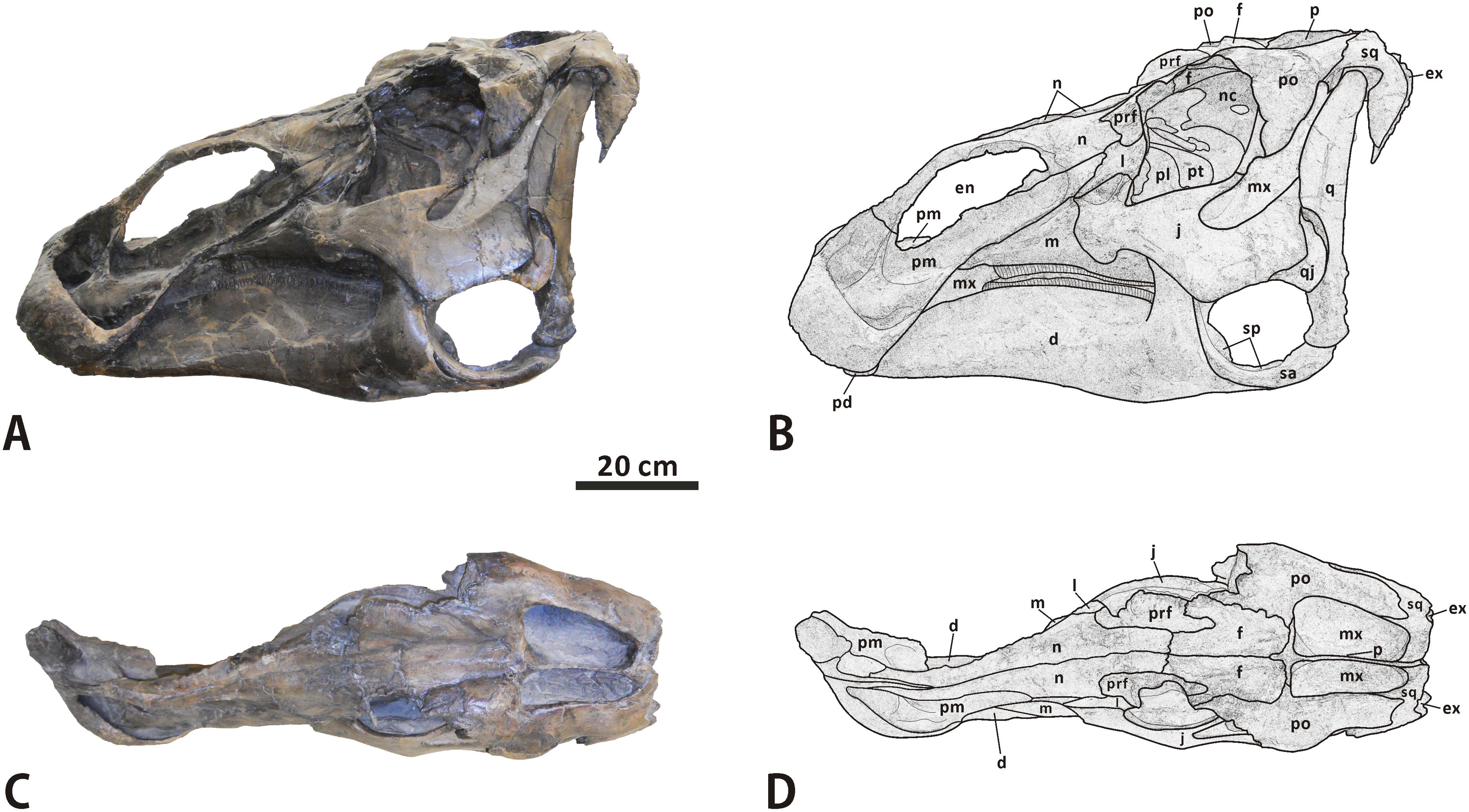
Labelled skull of E. regalis (specimen CMN 2288)

The skull of a fully grown Edmontosaurus could be over a metre long. One skull of E. annectens (formerly Anatotitan) measures 3.87 feet (1.18 m) long. The skull was roughly triangular in profile, with no bony cranial crest. Viewed from above, the front and rear of the skull were expanded, with the broad front forming a duck-bill or spoon-bill shape. The beak was toothless, and both the upper and lower beaks were extended by keratinous material. Substantial remains of the keratinous upper beak are known from the "mummy" kept at the Senckenberg Museum. In this specimen, the preserved nonbony part of the beak extended for at least 8 centimetres (3.1 in) beyond the bone, projecting down vertically. The nasal openings of Edmontosaurus were elongate and housed in deep depressions surrounded by distinct bony rims above, behind, and below.

In at least one case (the Senckenberg specimen), rarely preserved scleral rings were preserved in the eye sockets. Another rarely seen bone, the stapes (the reptilian ear bone), has also been seen in a specimen of Edmontosaurus. It has been suggested that Edmontosaurus may have had binocular vision based on the 3D scan of a nearly complete skull of E. regalis (CMN 2289).

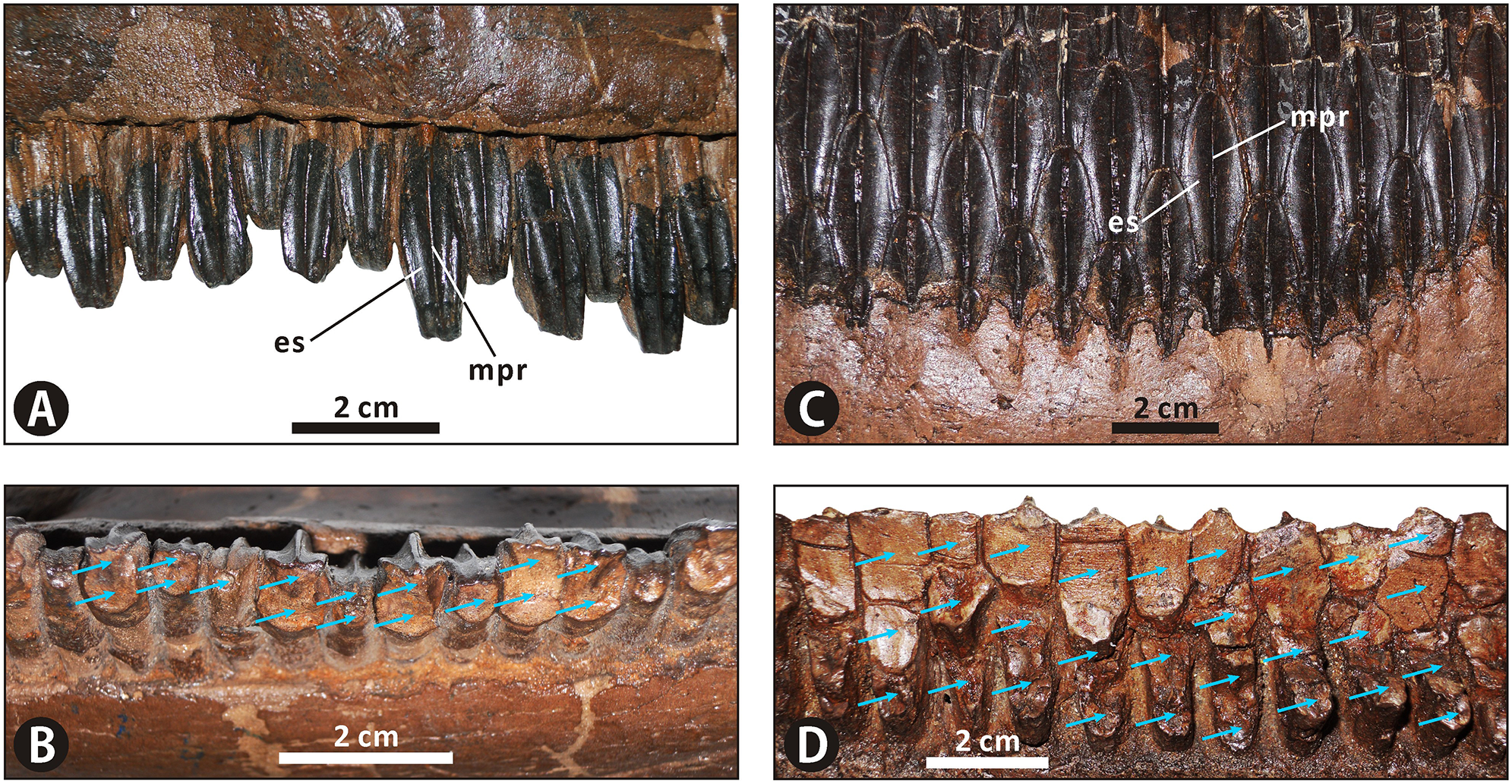
Dentition close-ups of E. regalis (specimen CMN 2289)

Teeth were present only in the maxillae (upper cheeks) and dentaries (main bone of the lower jaw). The teeth were continually replaced, taking about half a year to form. They were composed of six types of tissues, rivaling the complexity of mammal teeth. They grew in columns, with an observed maximum of six in each, and the number of columns varied based on the animal's size. Known column counts for the two species are: 51 to 53 columns per maxilla and 48 to 49 per dentary (teeth of the upper jaw being slightly narrower than those in the lower jaw) for E. regalis; and 52 columns per maxilla and 44 per dentary for E. annectens (an E. saskatchewanensis specimen).

=== Postcranial skeleton ===
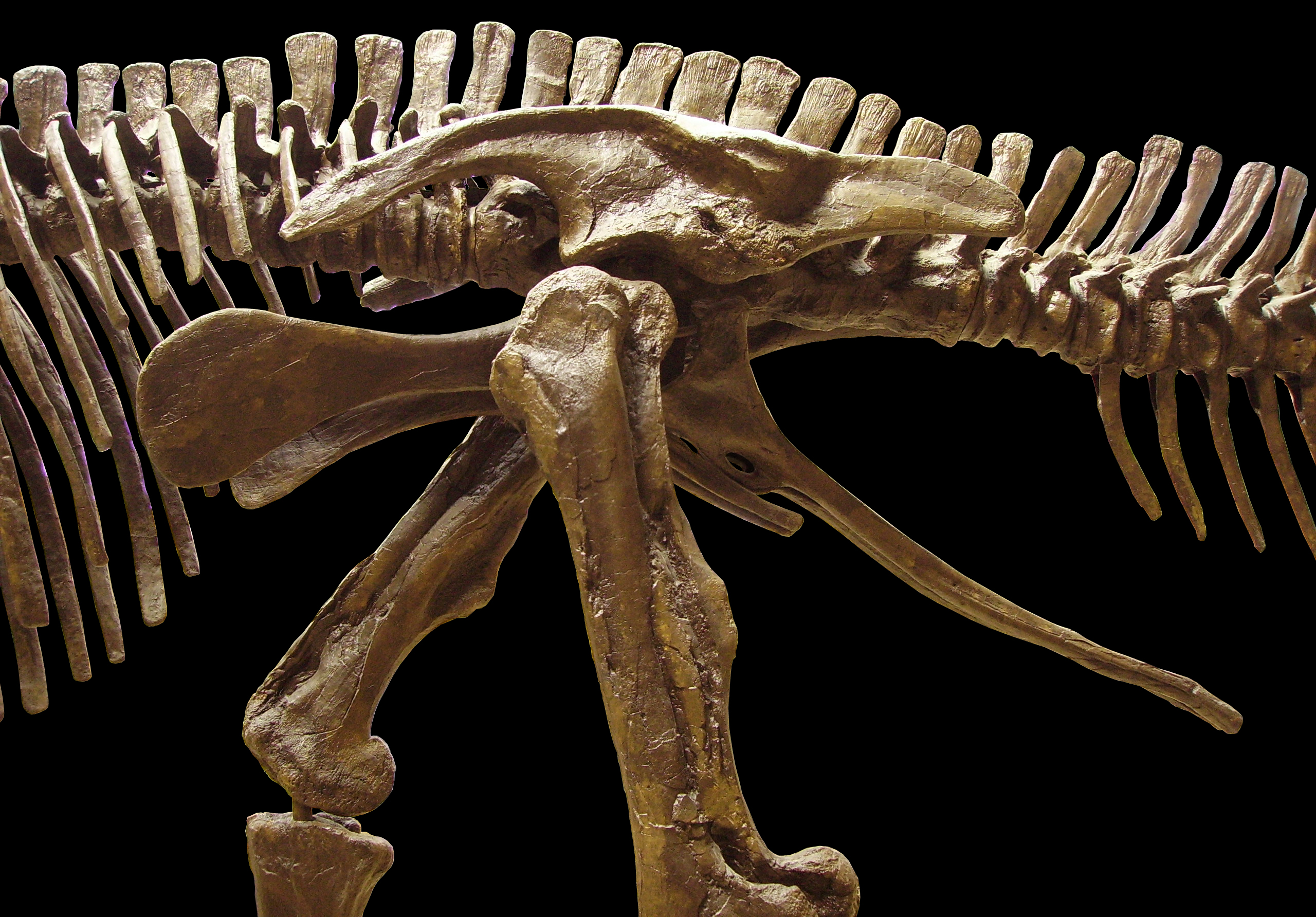
Hip bones of E. annectens

The number of vertebrae differs between specimens. E. regalis had thirteen neck vertebrae, eighteen back vertebrae, nine hip vertebrae, and an unknown number of tail vertebrae. A specimen once identified as belonging to Anatosaurus edmontoni (now considered to be the same as E. regalis) is reported as having an additional back vertebra and 85 tail vertebrae, with an undisclosed amount of restoration. Other hadrosaurids are only reported as having 50 to 70 tail vertebrae, so this appears to have been an overestimate. The anterior back was curved toward the ground, with the neck flexed upward and the rest of the back and tail held horizontally. Most of the back and tail were lined by ossified tendons arranged in a latticework along the neural spines of the vertebrae. This condition has been described as making the back and at least part of the tail "ramrod" straight. The ossified tendons are interpreted as having strengthened the vertebral column against gravitational stress, incurred through being a large animal with a horizontal vertebral column otherwise supported mostly by the hind legs and hips.

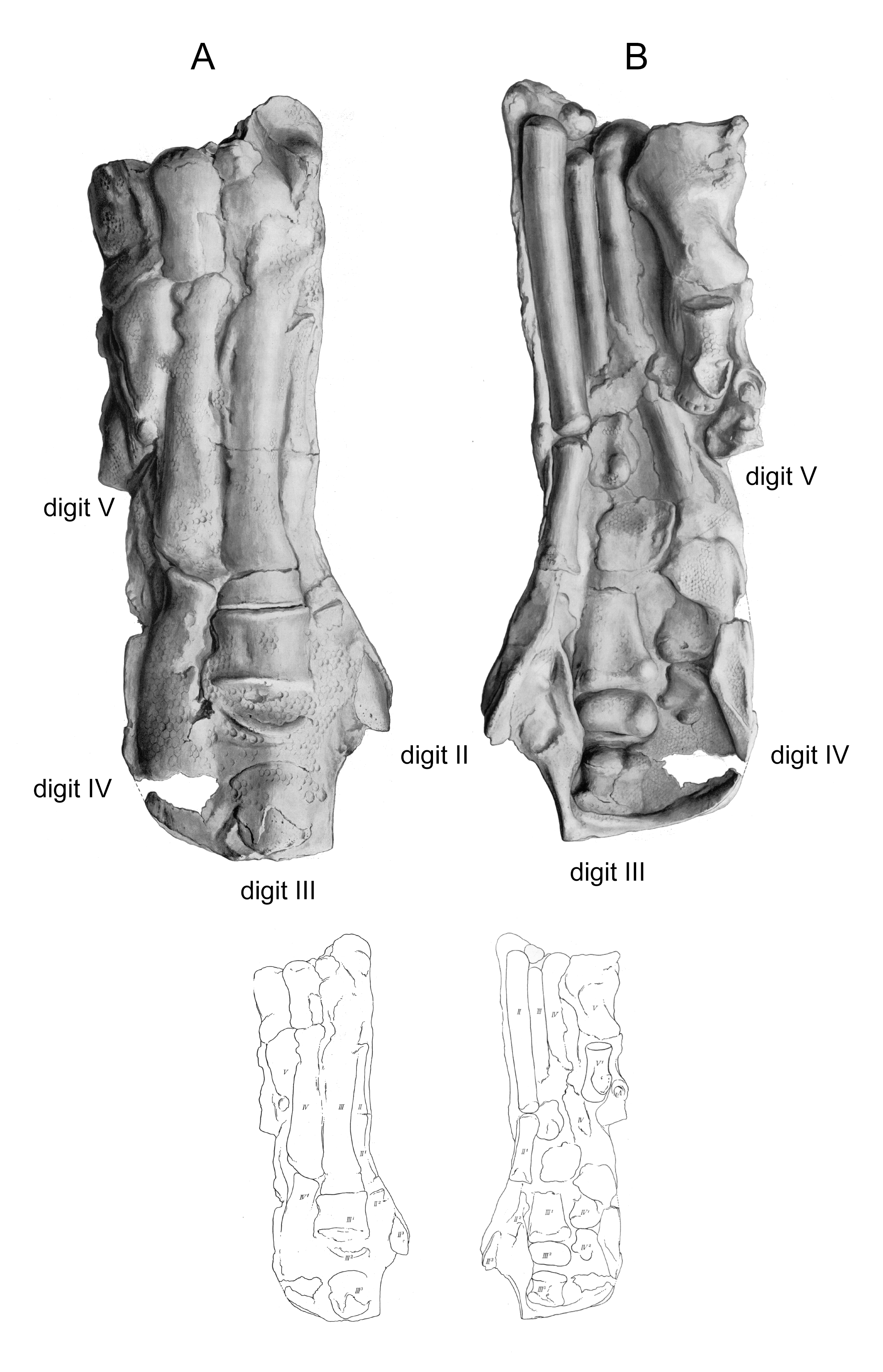
Labelled manus of AMNH 5060

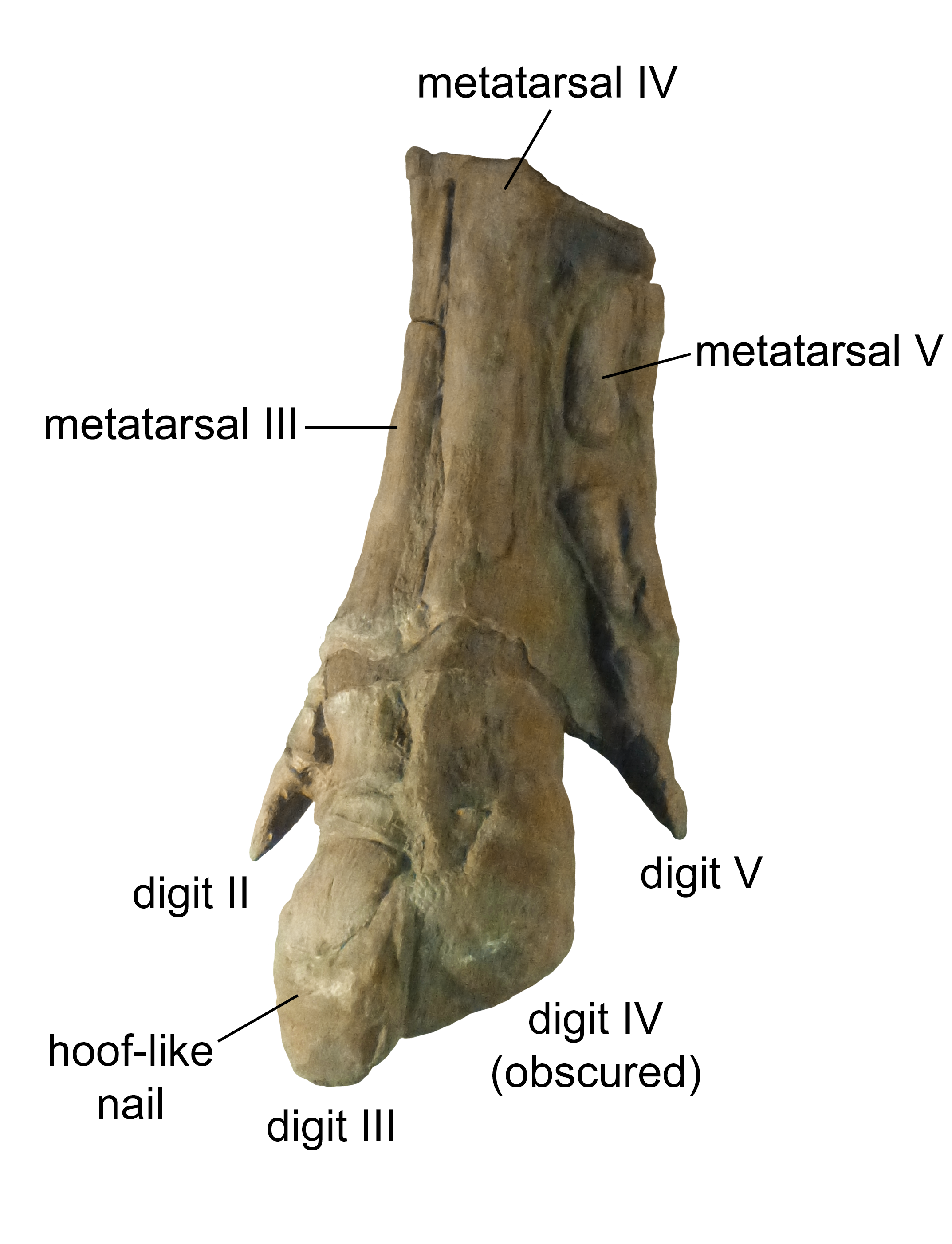
Labelled manus of SMF R 4036

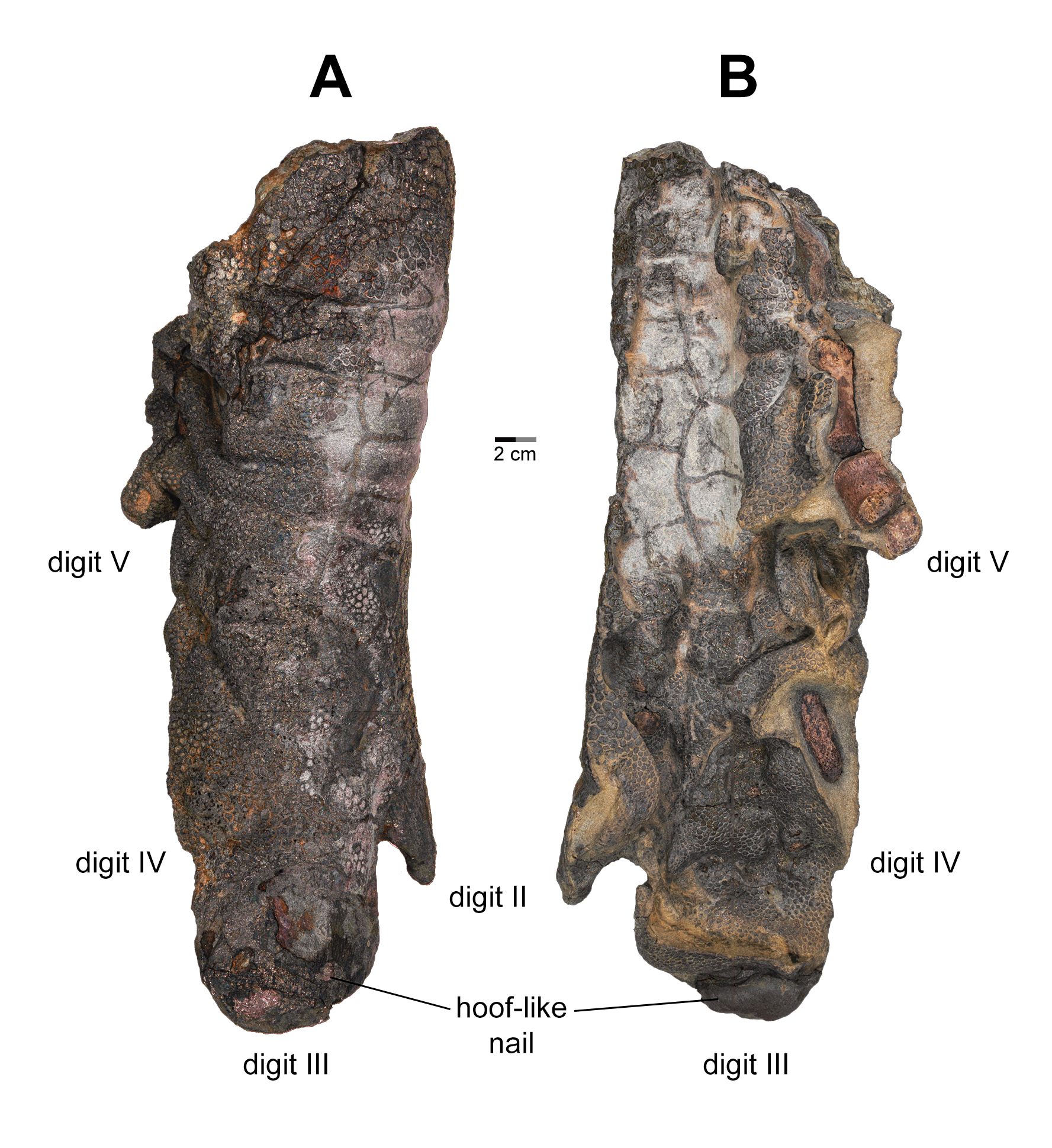
Labelled manus of NDGS 2000

The shoulder blades were long flat blade-like bones, held roughly parallel to the vertebral column. The hips were composed of three elements each: an elongate ilium above the articulation with the leg, an ischium below and behind with a long thin rod, and a pubis in front that flared into a plate-like structure. The structure of the hip hindered the animal from standing with its back erect, because in such a position the thigh bone would have pushed against the joint of the ilium and pubis, instead of pushing only against the solid ilium. The nine fused hip vertebrae provided support for the hip.

The fore legs were shorter and less heavily built than the hind legs. The upper arm had a large deltopectoral crest for muscle attachment, while the ulna and radius were slim. The upper arm and forearm were similar in length. The wrist was simple, with only two small bones. Each hand had four fingers, with no thumb (first finger). The index (second), third, and fourth fingers were approximately the same length and were united in life within a fleshy covering. Although the second and third finger had hoof-like unguals, these bones were also within the skin and not apparent from the outside. The little finger diverged from the other three and was much shorter. The thigh bone was robust and straight, with a prominent flange about halfway down the posterior side. This ridge was for the attachment of powerful muscles attached to the hips and tail that pulled the thighs (and thus the hind legs) backward and helped maintain the use of the tail as a balancing organ. Each foot had three toes, with no big toe or little toe. The toes had hoof-like tips.

=== Soft tissue ===
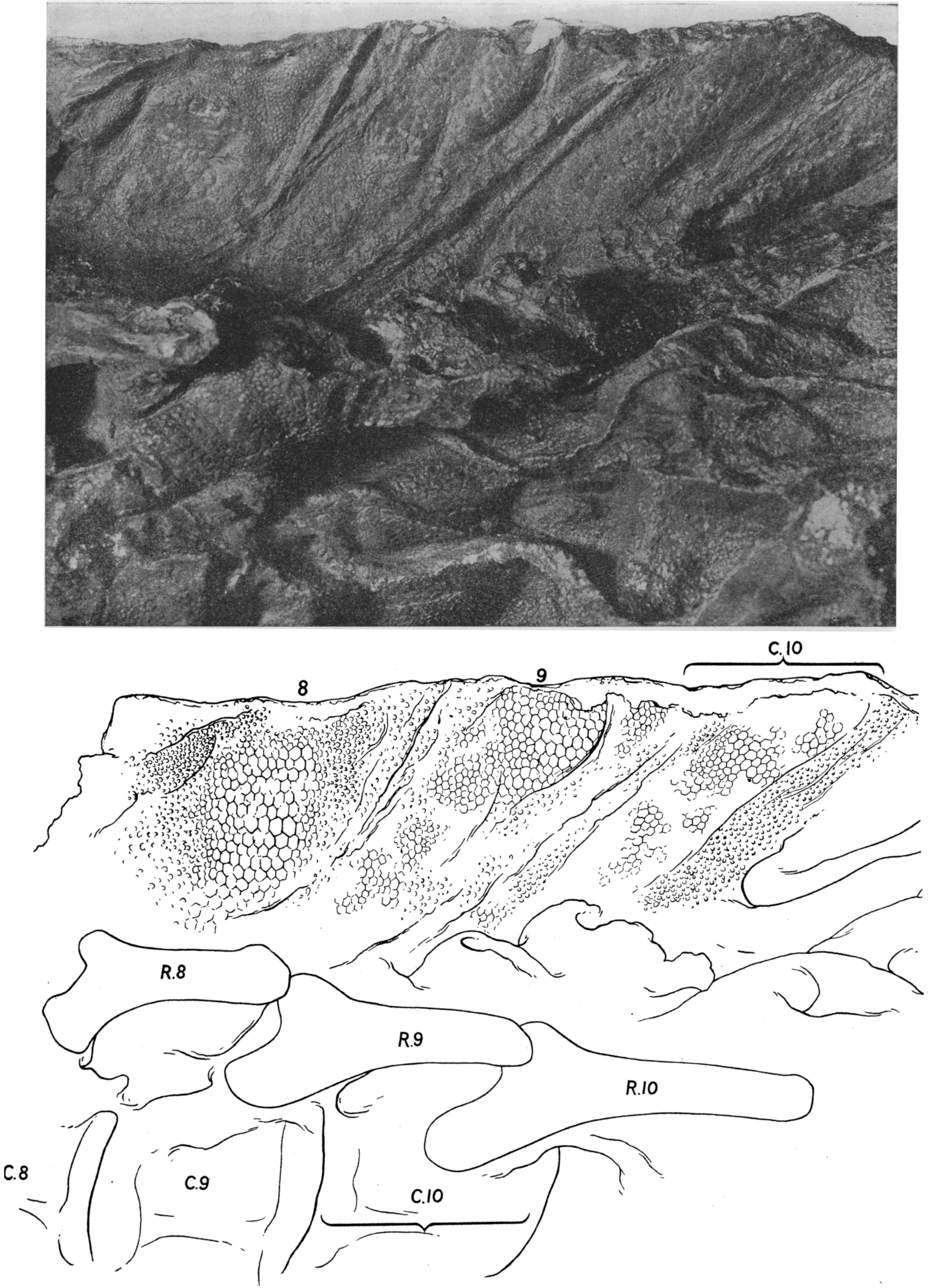
Neck frill skin impressions of AMNH 5060

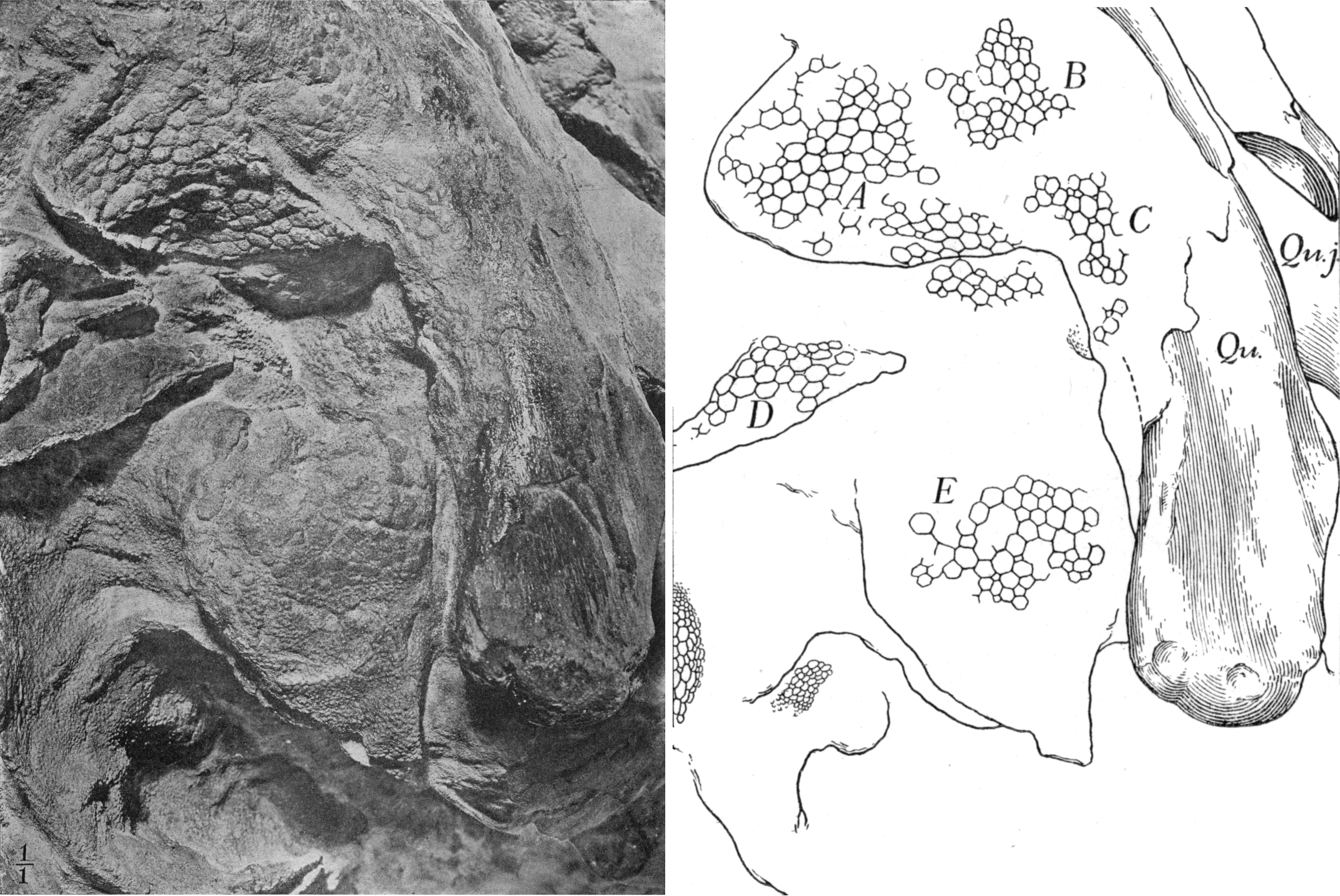
Back of the head skin impressions of AMNH 5060

Multiple specimens of Edmontosaurus annectens have been found with preserved skin impressions. Several have been well-publicized, such as the "Trachodon mummy" of the early 20th century, and the specimen nicknamed "Dakota", the latter apparently including remnant organic compounds from the skin. Because of these finds, the scalation of Edmontosaurus annectens is known for most areas of the body. Skin impressions are less well known for E. regalis; a mummified specimen (UALVP 53722) from the Wapiti Formation which preserves a soft tissue cranial crest or wattle on the head has been referred to E. regalis by Phil R. Bell and colleagues in 2014, but a re-examination by Henry Sharpe and colleagues in 2025 suggested that this specimen cannot be confidently referred to any known species of Edmontosaurus, and thus it probably represents a distinct taxon belonging to the Edmontosaurini, leading to a tentative assignment to as E. sp.

A preserved rhamphotheca present in the E. annectens specimen LACM 23502, housed in the Los Angeles County Museum, indicates the beak of Edmontosaurus was more hook-shaped and extensive than many illustrations in scientific and public media have previously depicted. Whether or not the specimen in question preserved the true rhamphotheca or just a cast of the inner structure attached to the bone is not known at present.

== Classification ==
Edmontosaurus was a hadrosaurid (a duck-billed dinosaur), a member of a family of dinosaurs which to date are known only from the Late Cretaceous. It is classified within the Saurolophinae (alternately Hadrosaurinae), a clade of hadrosaurids which lacked hollow crests. Other members of the group include Brachylophosaurus, Gryposaurus, Lophorhothon, Maiasaura, Naashoibitosaurus, Prosaurolophus, and Saurolophus. It was either closely related to or includes the species Anatosaurus annectens (alternately Edmontosaurus annectens), a large hadrosaurid from various latest Cretaceous formations of western North America. The giant Chinese hadrosaurine Shantungosaurus giganteus is also anatomically similar to Edmontosaurus; M. K. Brett-Surman found the two to differ only in details related to the greater size of Shantungosaurus, based on what had been described of the latter genus.

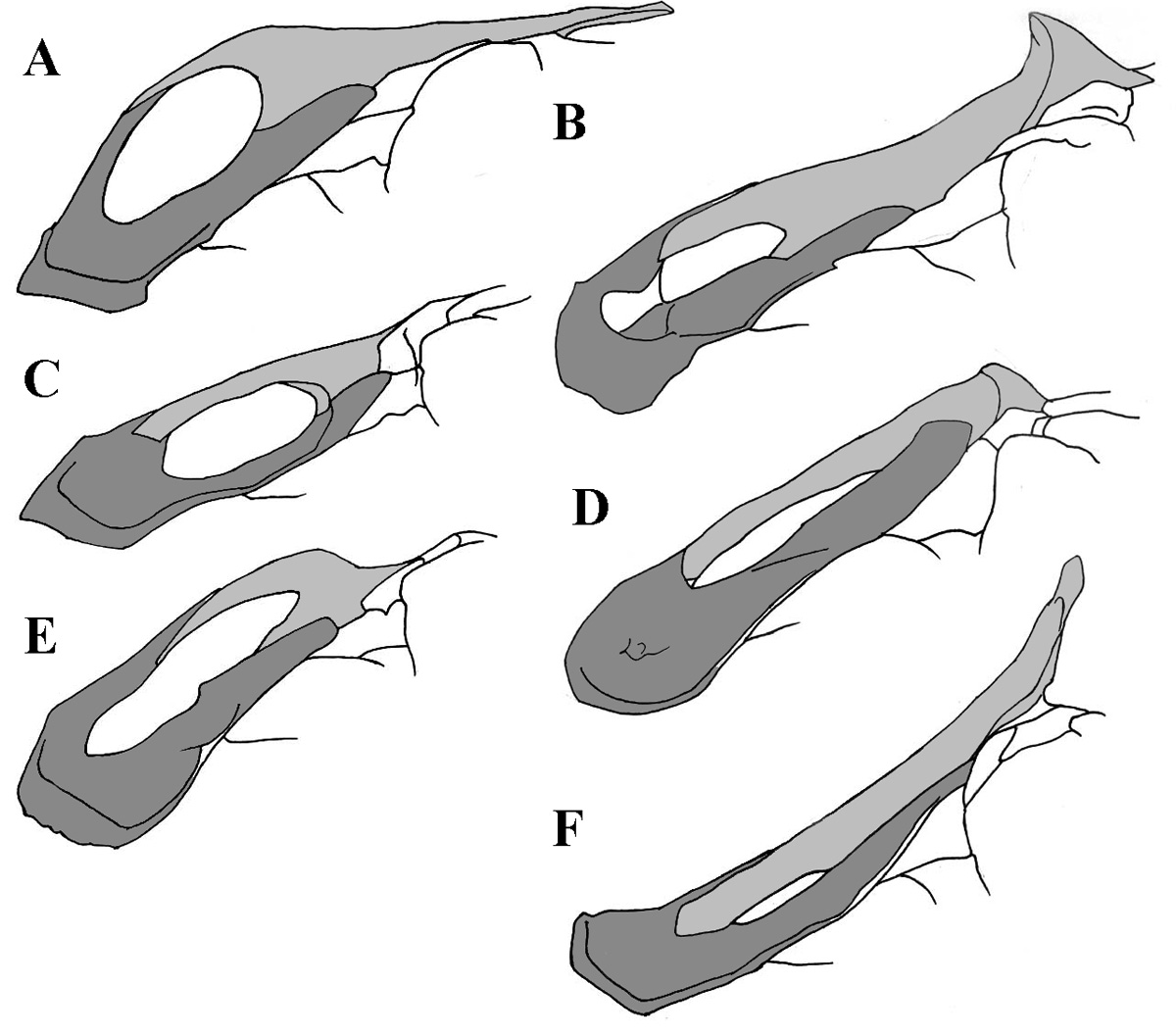
Premaxillae of several hadrosaurines compared (Edmontosaurus in C and E)

While the status of Edmontosaurus as a saurolophine has not been challenged, its exact placement within the clade is uncertain. Early phylogenies, such as that presented in R. S. Lull and Nelda Wright's influential 1942 monograph, had Edmontosaurus and various species of Anatosaurus (most of which would be later considered as additional species or specimens of Edmontosaurus) as one lineage among several lineages of "flat-headed" hadrosaurs. One of the first analyses using cladistic methods found it to be linked with Anatosaurus (=Anatotitan) and Shantungosaurus in an informal "edmontosaur" clade, which was paired with the spike-crested "saurolophs" and more distantly related to the "brachylophosaurs" and arch-snouted "gryposaurs". A 2007 study by Terry Gates and Scott Sampson found broadly similar results, in that Edmontosaurus remained close to Saurolophus and Prosaurolophus and distant from Gryposaurus, Brachylophosaurus, and Maiasaura. However, the most recent review of Hadrosauridae, by Jack Horner and colleagues (2004), came to a noticeably different result: Edmontosaurus was nested between Gryposaurus and the "brachylophosaurs", and distant from Saurolophus. Edmontosaurus is the namesake genus of the saurolophine tribe Edmontosaurini, which also includes taxa like Shantungosaurus, Kerberosaurus and Laiyangosaurus.

- Hadrosaurinae
  - Hadrosaurus
  - - Brachylophosaurini
    - - Kritosaurini
      - - Saurolophini
        - - Edmontosaurini
            - - Kamuysaurus
              - - Kerberosaurus
                - Laiyangosaurus
            - - Shantungosaurus
              - - Edmontosaurus
                  - Edmontosaurus annectens
                  - Edmontosaurus regalis

== Paleobiology ==
=== Diet and feeding ===
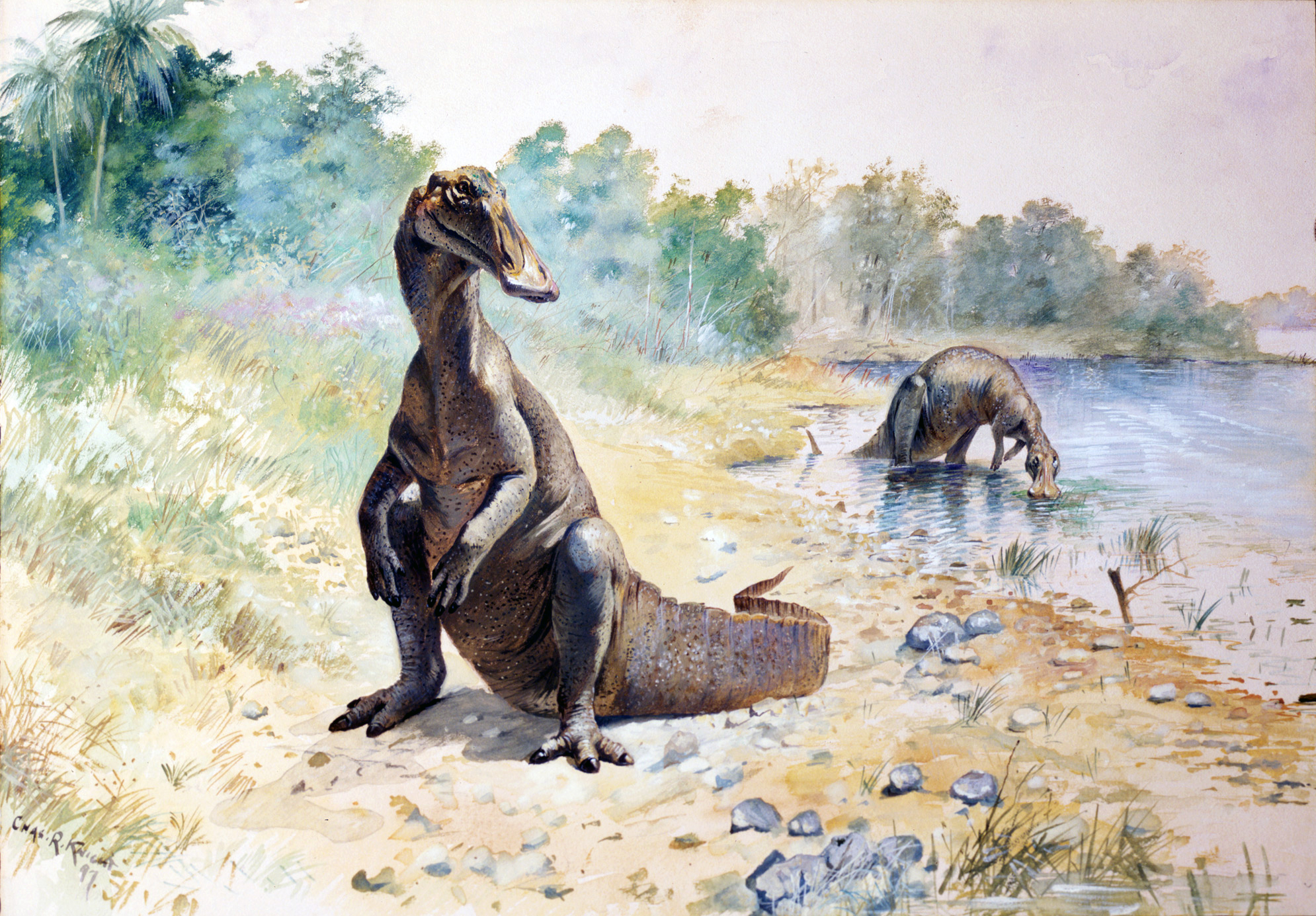
1897 restoration by Charles R. Knight of E. annectens as semi-aquatic animals that could only chew soft water plants, a popular idea at the time which is now outdated

As a hadrosaurid, Edmontosaurus was a large terrestrial herbivore. Its teeth were continually replaced and packed into dental batteries that contained hundreds of teeth, only a relative handful of which were in use at any time. It used its broad beak to cut loose food, perhaps by cropping, or by closing the jaws in a clamshell-like manner over twigs and branches and then stripping off the more nutritious leaves and shoots. Because the tooth rows are deeply indented from the outside of the jaws, and because of other anatomical details, it is inferred that Edmontosaurus and most other ornithischians had cheek-like structures, muscular or non-muscular. The function of the cheeks was to retain food in the mouth. The animal's feeding range would have been from ground level to around 4 metres (13 ft) above.

Before the 1960s and 1970s, the prevailing interpretation of hadrosaurids like Edmontosaurus was that they were aquatic and fed on aquatic plants. An example of this is William Morris's 1970 interpretation of an edmontosaur skull with nonbony beak remnants. He proposed that the animal had a diet much like that of some modern ducks, filtering plants and aquatic invertebrates like mollusks and crustaceans from the water and discharging water via V-shaped furrows along the inner face of the upper beak. This interpretation of the beak has been rejected, as the furrows and ridges are more like those of herbivorous turtle beaks than the flexible structures seen in filter-feeding birds.

Because scratches dominate the microwear texture of the teeth, Williams et al. suggested Edmontosaurus was a grazer instead of a browser, which would be predicted to have fewer scratches due to eating less abrasive materials. Candidates for ingested abrasives include silica-rich plants like horsetails and soil that was accidentally ingested due to feeding at ground level. When compared to the dental microwear textures of other hadrosaurids, however, those of Edmontosaurus do not suggest that the abrasiveness of food items it consumed was drastically greater than what other hadrosaurids consumed. In high latitude regions like Alaska, conifers would have been the dominant food source, although the diet of Edmontosaurus would have been seasonally variable. The tooth structure indicates combined slicing and grinding capabilities.

Reports of gastroliths, or stomach stones, in the hadrosaurid Claosaurus is actually based on a probable double misidentification. First, the specimen is actually of Edmontosaurus annectens. Barnum Brown, who discovered the specimen in 1900, referred to it as Claosaurus because E. annectens was thought to be a species of Claosaurus at the time. Additionally, it is more likely that the supposed gastroliths represent gravel washed in during burial.

==== Gut contents ====
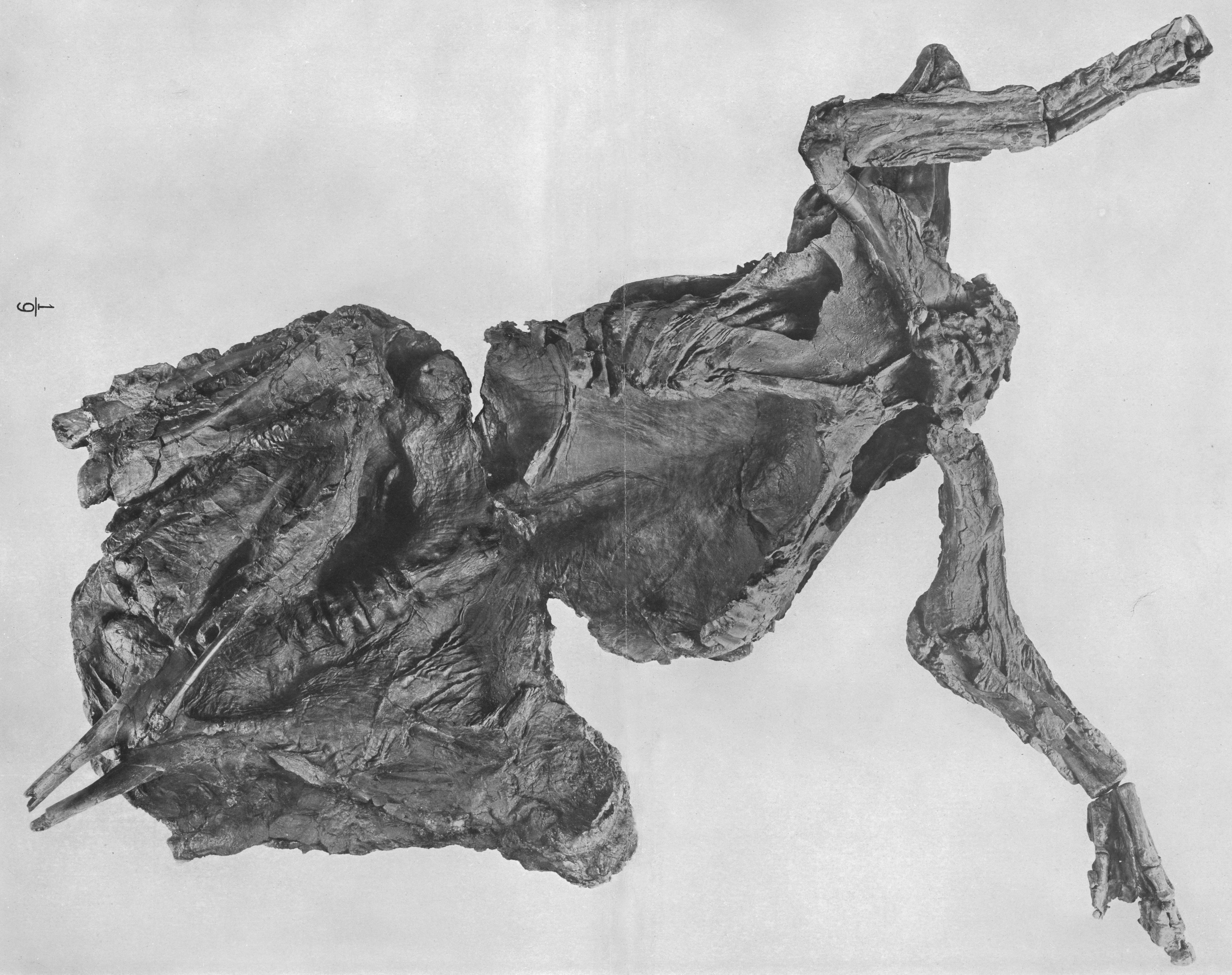
Possible gut contents were reported from the "Trachodon mummy" at the American Museum of Natural History, but were never described.

Both of the "mummy" specimens collected by the Sternbergs were reported to have had possible gut contents. Charles H. Sternberg reported the presence of carbonized gut contents in the American Museum of Natural History specimen, but this material has not been described. The plant remains in the Senckenberg Museum specimen have been described, but have proven difficult to interpret. The plants found in the carcass included needles of the conifer Cunninghamites elegans, twigs from conifer and broadleaf trees, and numerous small seeds or fruits. Upon their description in 1922, they were the subject of a debate in the German-language journal Paläontologische Zeitschrift. Kräusel, who described the material, interpreted it as the gut contents of the animal, while Abel could not rule out that the plants had been washed into the carcass after death.

At the time, hadrosaurids were thought to have been aquatic animals, and Kräusel made a point of stating that the specimen did not rule out hadrosaurids eating water plants. The discovery of possible gut contents made little impact in English-speaking circles, except for another brief mention of the aquatic-terrestrial dichotomy, until it was brought up by John Ostrom in the course of an article reassessing the old interpretation of hadrosaurids as water-bound. Instead of trying to adapt the discovery to the aquatic model, he used it as a line of evidence that hadrosaurids were terrestrial herbivores. While his interpretation of hadrosaurids as terrestrial animals has been generally accepted, the Senckenberg plant fossils remain equivocal. Kenneth Carpenter has suggested that they may actually represent the gut contents of a starving animal, instead of a typical diet. Other authors have noted that because the plant fossils were removed from their original context in the specimen and were heavily prepared, it is no longer possible to follow up on the original work, leaving open the possibility that the plants were washed-in debris.

==== Isotopic studies ====
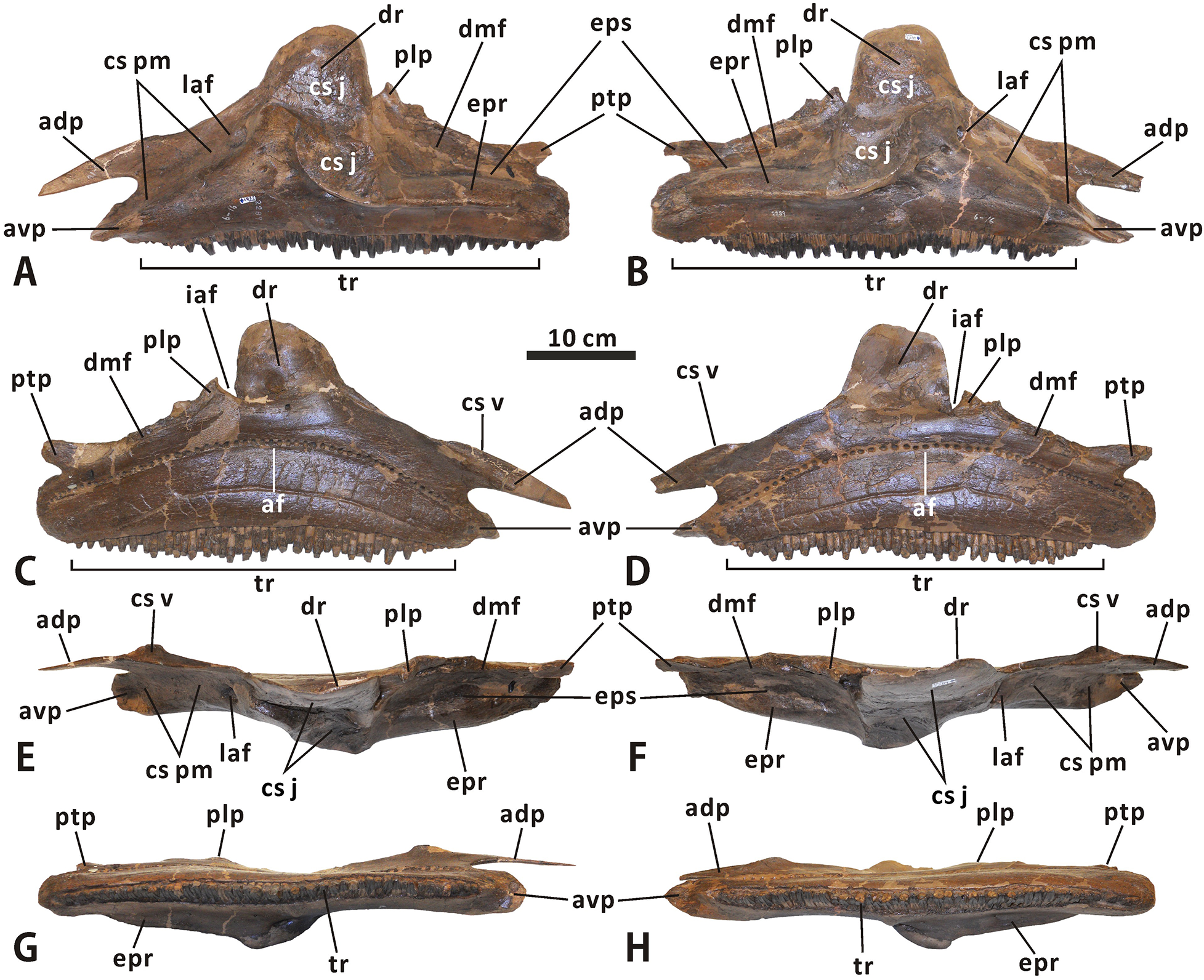
E. regalis maxillae with teeth (specimen CMN 2289)

The diet and physiology of Edmontosaurus have been probed by using stable isotopes of carbon and oxygen as recorded in tooth enamel. When feeding, drinking, and breathing, animals take in carbon and oxygen, which become incorporated into bone. The isotopes of these two elements are determined by various internal and external factors, such as the type of plants being eaten, the physiology of the animal, salinity, and climate. If isotope ratios in fossils are not altered by fossilization and later changes, they can be studied for information about the original factors; warmblooded animals will have certain isotopic compositions compared to their surroundings, animals that eat certain types of plants or use certain digestive processes will have distinct isotopic compositions, and so on. Enamel is typically used because the structure of the mineral that forms enamel makes it the most resistant material to chemical change in the skeleton.

A 2004 study by Kathryn Thomas and Sandra Carlson used teeth from the upper jaw of three individuals interpreted as a juvenile, a subadult, and an adult, recovered from a bone bed in the Hell Creek Formation of Corson County, South Dakota. In this study, successive teeth in columns in the edmontosaurs' dental batteries were sampled from multiple locations along each tooth using a microdrilling system. This sampling method takes advantage of the organization of hadrosaurid dental batteries to find variation in tooth isotopes over a period of time. From their work, it appears that edmontosaur teeth took less than about 0.65 years to form, slightly faster in younger edmontosaurs. The teeth of all three individuals appeared to show variation in oxygen isotope ratios that could correspond to warm/dry and cool/wet periods; Thomas and Carlson considered the possibility that the animals were migrating instead, but favored local seasonal variations because migration would have more likely led to ratio homogenization, as many animals migrate to stay within specific temperature ranges or near particular food sources.

The edmontosaurs also showed enriched carbon isotope values, which for modern mammals would be interpreted as a mixed diet of C3 plants (most plants) and C4 plants (grasses); however, C4 plants were extremely rare in the Late Cretaceous if present at all. Thomas and Carlson put forward several factors that may have been operating, and found the most likely to include a diet heavy in gymnosperms, consuming salt-stressed plants from coastal areas adjacent to the Western Interior Seaway, and a physiological difference between dinosaurs and mammals that caused dinosaurs to form tissue with different carbon ratios than would be expected for mammals. A combination of factors is also possible.

=== Chewing ===
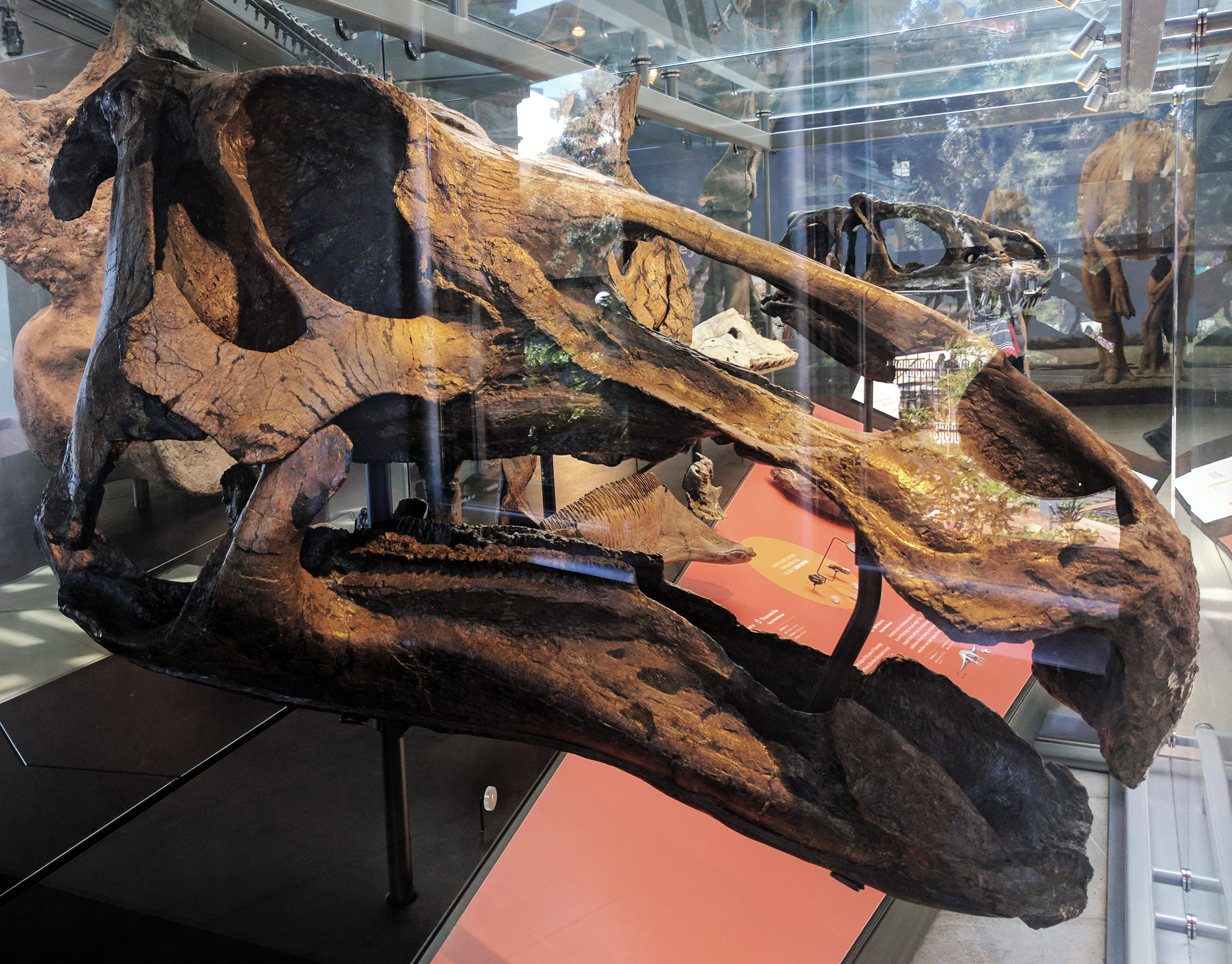
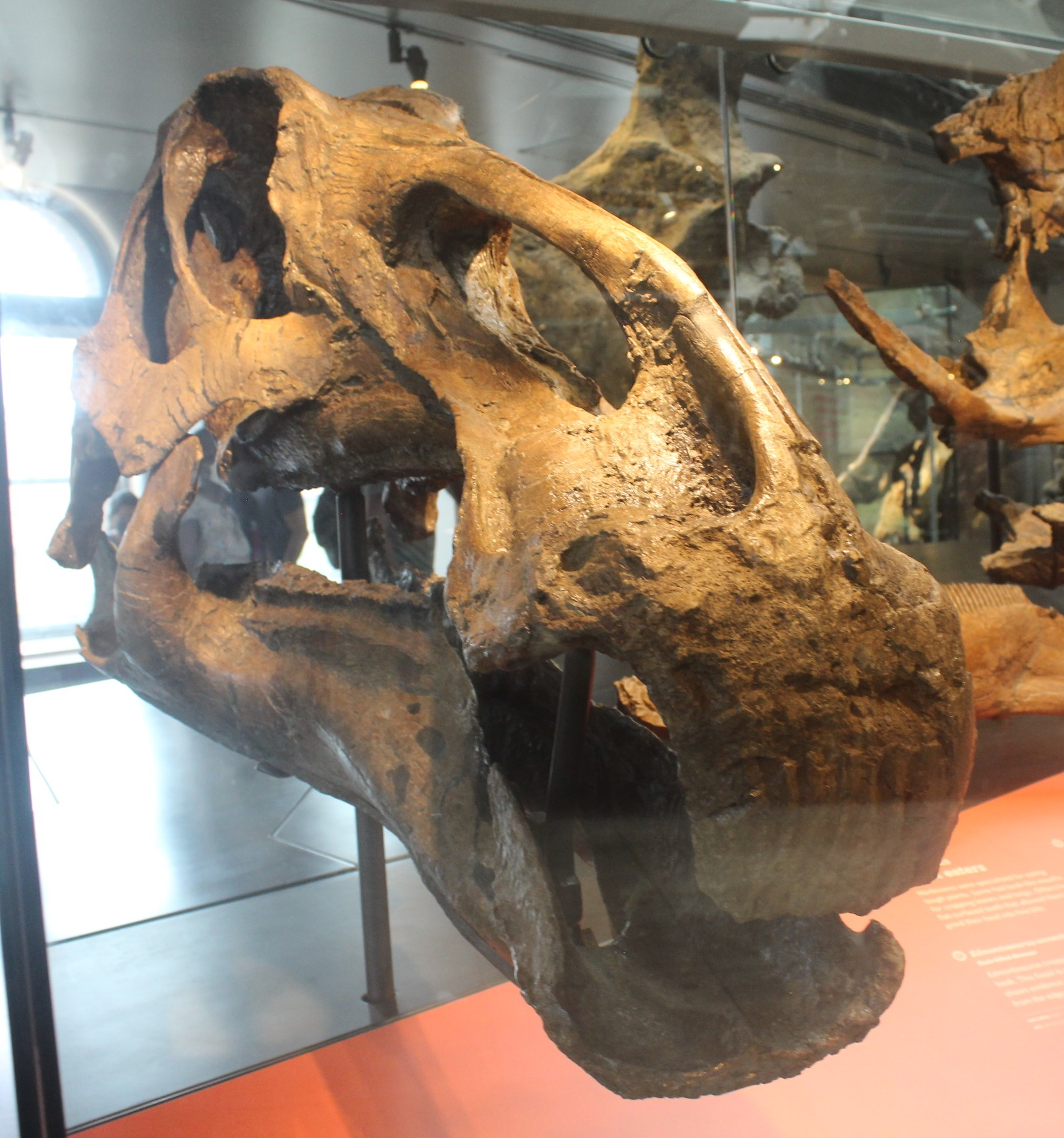
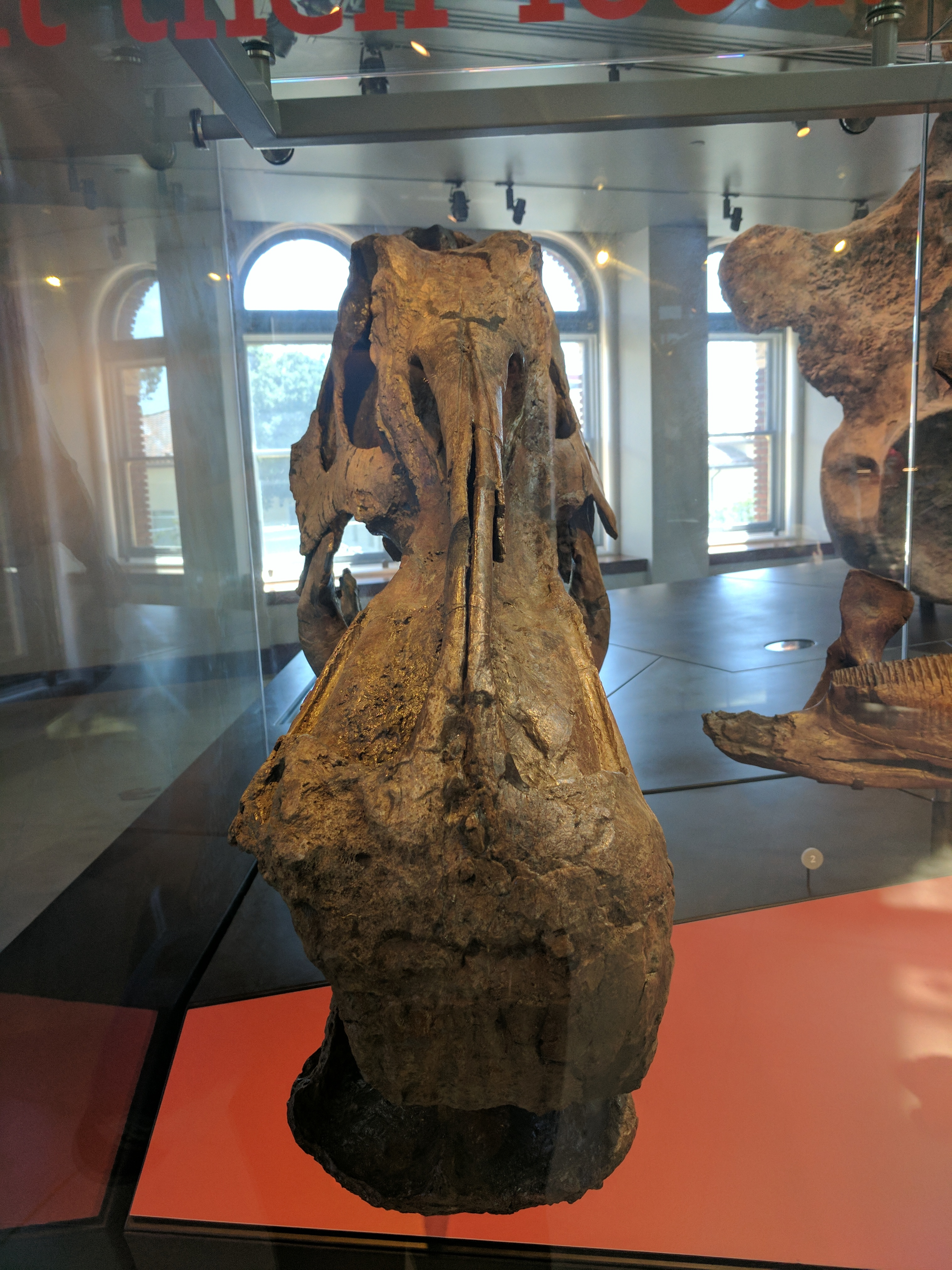
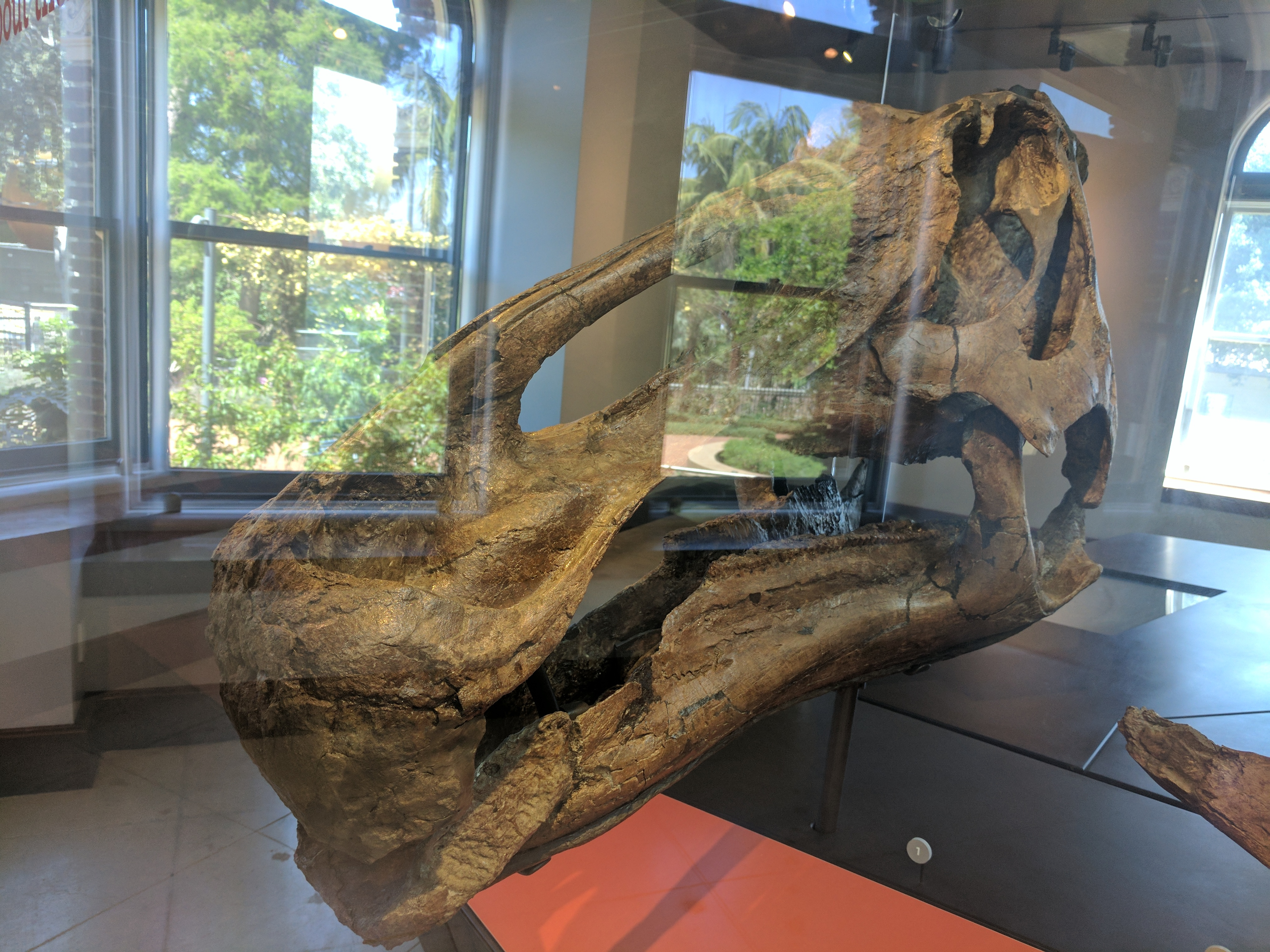
E. annectens skull preserving the keratinous beak (partially removed on the right side by accident), Natural History Museum of Los Angeles

Between the mid-1980s and the 2000s, the prevailing interpretation of how hadrosaurids processed their food followed the model put forward in 1984 by David B. Weishampel. He proposed that the structure of the skull permitted motion between bones that resulted in backward and forward motion of the lower jaw, and outward bowing of the tooth-bearing bones of the upper jaw when the mouth was closed. The teeth of the upper jaw would grind against the teeth of the lower jaw like rasps, processing plant material trapped between them. Such a motion would parallel the effects of mastication in mammals, although accomplishing the effects in a completely different way. Work in the early 2000s has challenged the Weishampel model. A study published in 2008 by Casey Holliday and Lawrence Witmer found that ornithopods like Edmontosaurus lacked the types of skull joints seen in those modern animals that are known to have kinetic skulls (skulls that permit motion between their constituent bones), such as squamates and birds. They proposed that joints that had been interpreted as permitting movement in dinosaur skulls were actually cartilaginous growth zones. An important piece of evidence for Weishampel's model is the orientation of scratches on the teeth, showing the direction of jaw action. Other movements could produce similar scratches though, such as movement of the bones of the two halves of the lower jaw. Not all models have been scrutinized under present techniques. Vincent Williams and colleagues (2009) published additional work on hadrosaurid tooth microwear. They found four classes of scratches on Edmontosaurus teeth. The most common class was interpreted as resulting from an oblique motion, not a simple up-down or front-back motion, which is consistent with the Weishampel model. This motion is thought to have been the primary motion for grinding food. Two scratch classes were interpreted as resulting from forward or backward movement of the jaws. The other class was variable and probably resulted from opening the jaws. The combination of movements is more complex than had been previously predicted.

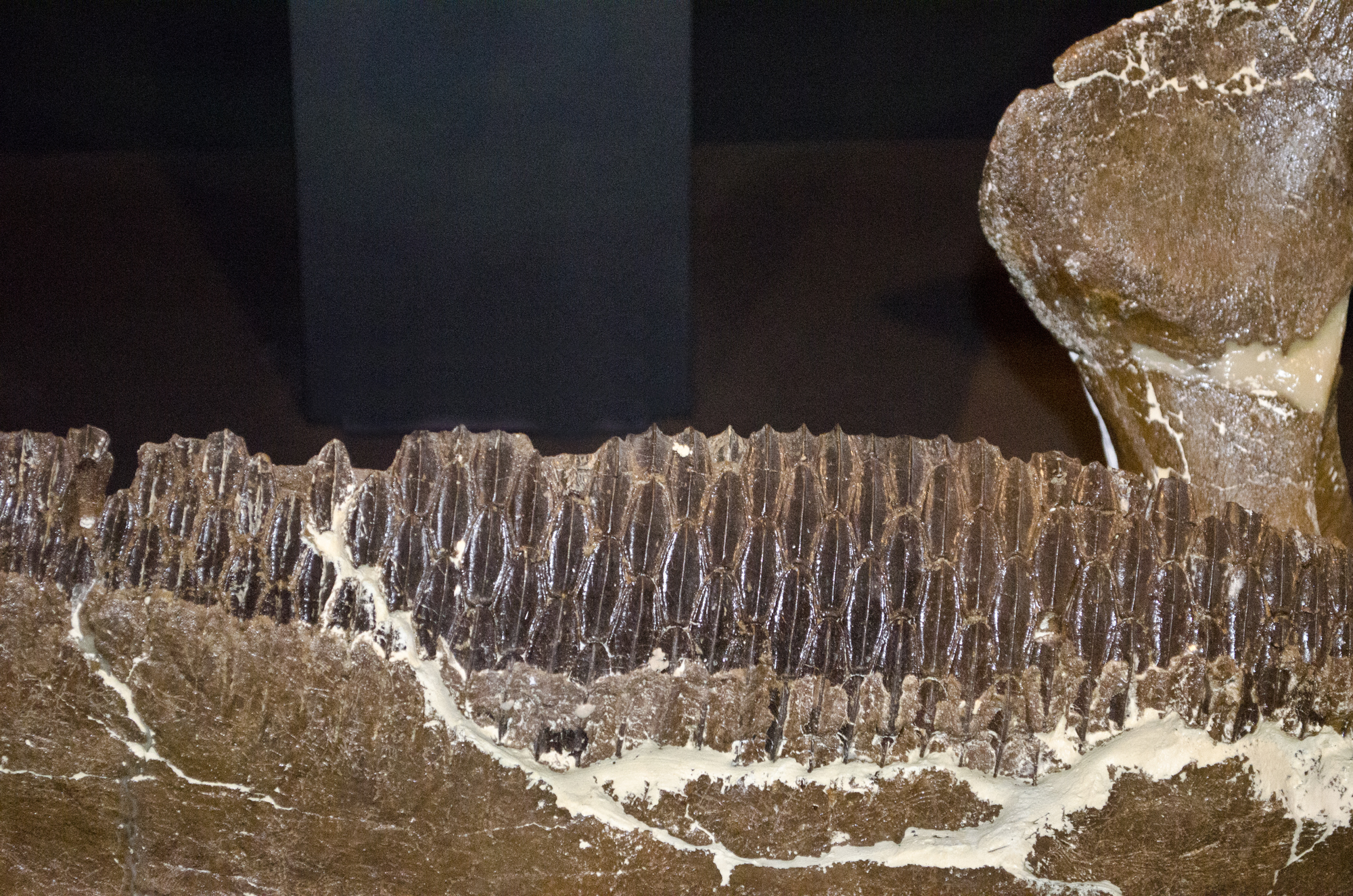
Close up of teeth in the lower jaw

Weishampel developed his model with the aid of a computer simulation. Natalia Rybczynski and colleagues have updated this work with a much more sophisticated three-dimensional animation model, scanning a skull of E. regalis with lasers. They were able to replicate the proposed motion with their model, although they found that additional secondary movements between other bones were required, with maximum separations of 1.3 to 1.4 centimetres (0.51 to 0.55 in) between some bones during the chewing cycle. Rybczynski and colleagues were not convinced that the Weishampel model is viable, but noted that they have several improvements to implement to their animation. Planned improvements include incorporating soft tissue and tooth wear marks and scratches, which should better constrain movements. They note that there are several other hypotheses to test as well. Further research published in 2012 by Robin Cuthbertson and colleagues found the motions required for Weishampel's model to be unlikely, and favored a model in which movements of the lower jaw produced grinding action. The lower jaw's joint with the upper jaw would permit anterior–posterior motion along with the usual rotation, and the anterior joint of the two halves of the lower jaw would also permit motion; in combination, the two halves of the lower jaw could move slightly back and forth as well as rotating slightly along their long axes. These motions would account for the observed tooth wear and a more solidly constructed skull than modeled by Weishampel.

=== Growth ===
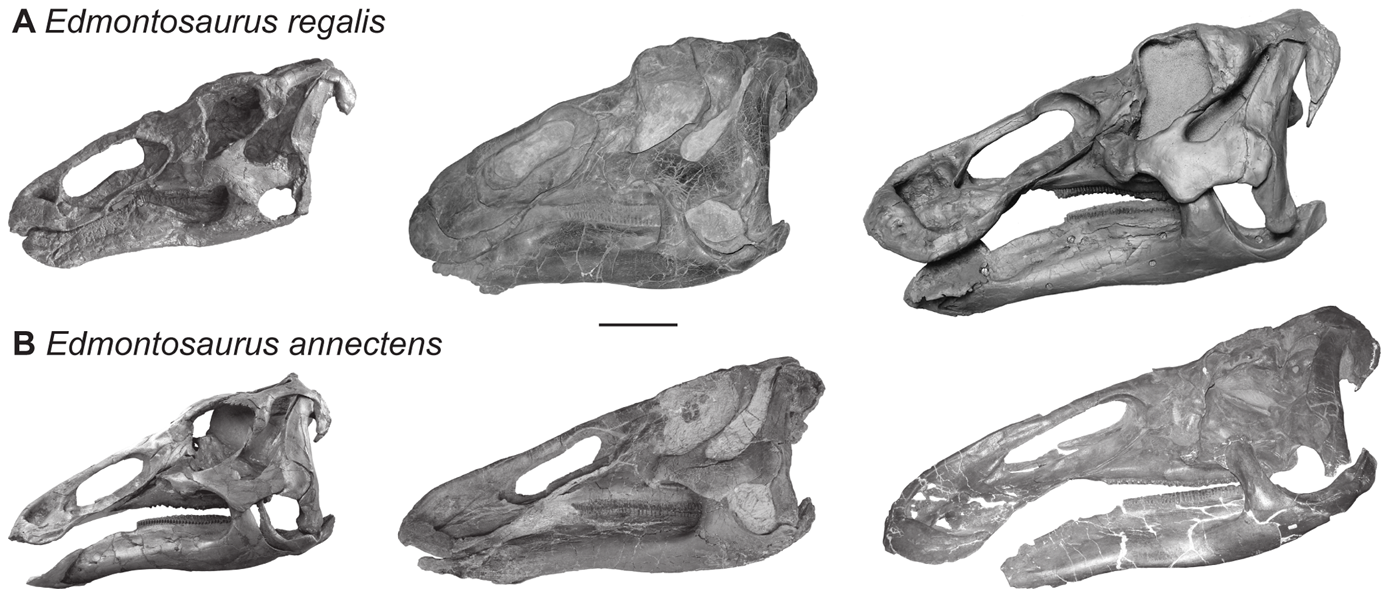
Skull growth series of Edmontosaurus (E. regalis top, and E. annectens bottom)

In a 2011 study, Campione and Evans recorded data from all known "edmontosaur" skulls from the Campanian and Maastrichtian and used it to plot a morphometric graph, comparing variable features of the skull with skull size. Their results showed that within both recognized Edmontosaurus species, many features previously used to classify additional species or genera were directly correlated with skull size. Campione and Evans interpreted these results as strongly suggesting that the shape of Edmontosaurus skulls changed dramatically as they grew. This has led to several apparent mistakes in classification in the past. The Campanian species Thespesius edmontoni, previously considered a synonym of E. annectens due to its small size and skull shape, is more likely a subadult specimen of the contemporary E. regalis. Similarly, the three previously recognized Maastrichtian edmontosaur species likely represent growth stages of a single species, with E. saskatchewanensis representing juveniles, E. annectens subadults, and Anatotitan copei fully mature adults. The skulls became longer and flatter as the animals grew.

In a 2014 study, researchers proposed that E. regalis reached maturity in 10-15 years of age. In a 2022 study, Wosik and Evans proposed that E. annectens reached maturity in 9 years of age based on their analysis for various specimens from different localities. They found the result to be similar to that of other hadrosaurs.

=== Brain and nervous system ===
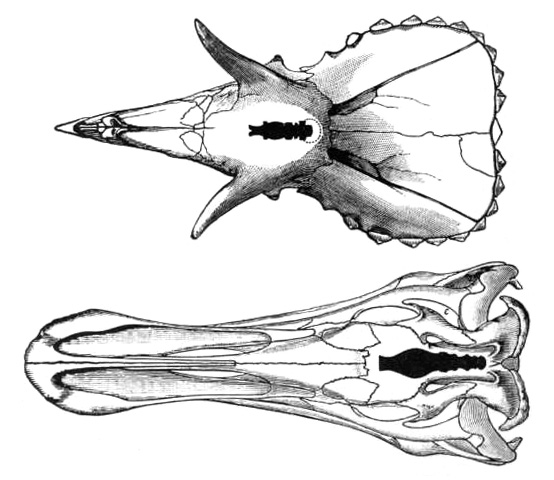
A 1905 chart showing the relatively small brains of a Triceratops (top) and E. annectens

The brain of Edmontosaurus has been described in several papers and abstracts through the use of endocasts of the cavity where the brain had been. E. annectens and E. regalis, as well as specimens not identified to species, have been studied in this way. The brain was not particularly large for an animal the size of Edmontosaurus. The space holding it was only about a quarter of the length of the skull, and various endocasts have been measured as displacing 374 millilitres (13 US fl oz) to 450 millilitres (15 US fl oz), which does not take into account that the brain may have occupied as little as 50% of the space of the endocast, the rest of the space being taken up by the dura mater surrounding the brain. For example, the brain of the specimen with the 374 millilitre endocast is estimated to have had a volume of 268 millilitres (9 US fl oz). The brain was an elongate structure, and as with other non-mammals, there would have been no neocortex. Like Stegosaurus, the neural canal was expanded in the hips, but not to the same degree: the endosacral space of Stegosaurus had 20 times the volume of its endocranial cast, whereas the endosacral space of Edmontosaurus was only 2.59 times larger in volume.

=== Pathologies and health ===
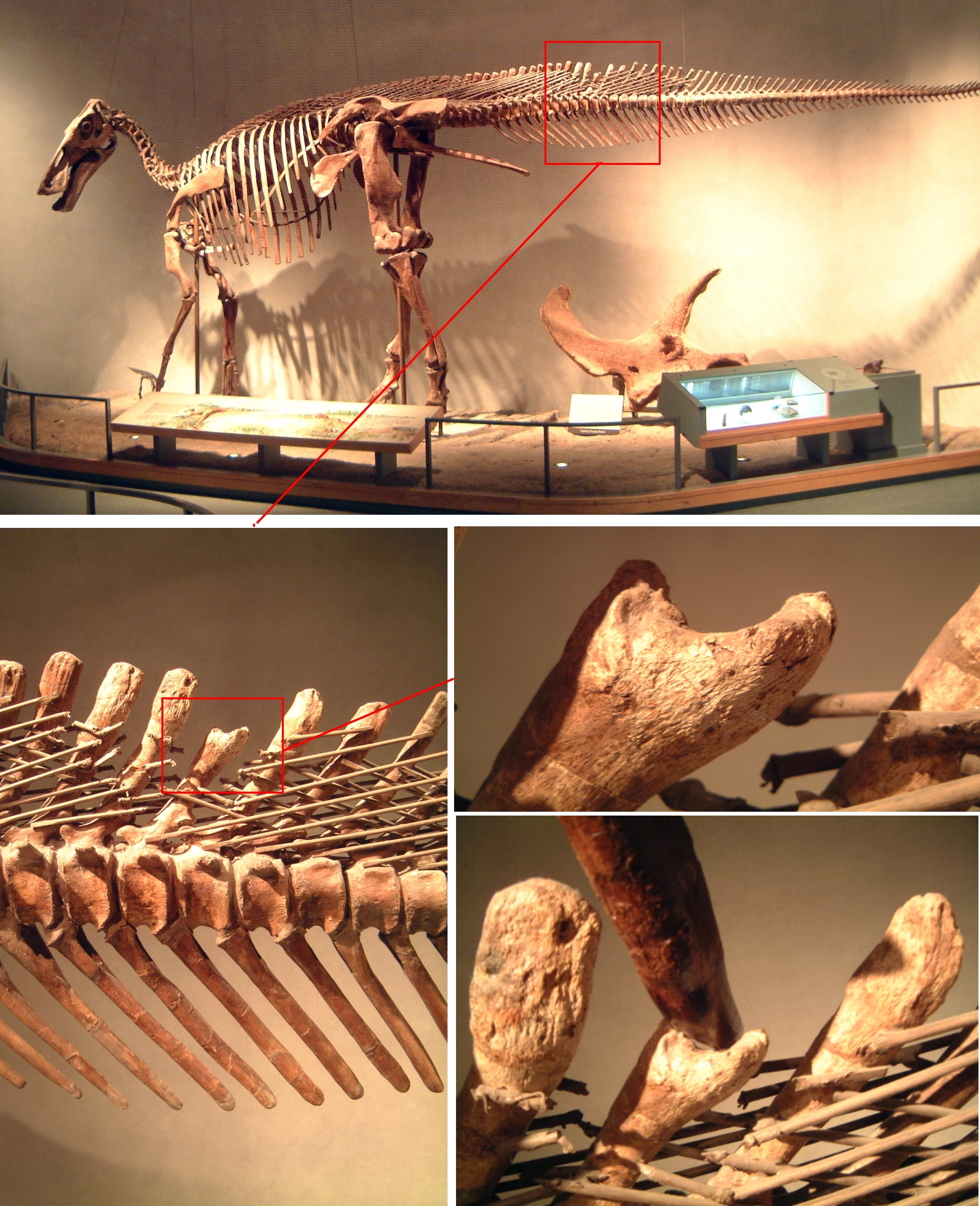
Damaged and partially healed tail spine of E. annectens as evidence of failed attack by Tyrannosaurus.

In 2003, evidence of tumors, including hemangiomas, desmoplastic fibroma, metastatic cancer, and osteoblastoma, was described in Edmontosaurus bones. Rothschild et al. tested dinosaur vertebrae for tumors using computerized tomography and fluoroscope screening. Several other hadrosaurids, including Brachylophosaurus, Gilmoreosaurus, and Bactrosaurus, also tested positive. Although more than 10,000 fossils were examined in this manner, the tumors were limited to Edmontosaurus and closely related genera. The tumors may have been caused by environmental factors or genetic propensity.

Osteochondrosis, or surficial pits in bone at places where bones articulate, is also known in Edmontosaurus. This condition, resulting from cartilage failing to be replaced by bone during growth, was found to be present in 2.2% of 224 edmontosaur toe bones. The underlying cause of the condition is unknown. Genetic predisposition, trauma, feeding intensity, alterations in blood supply, excess thyroid hormones, and deficiencies in various growth factors have been suggested. Among dinosaurs, osteochondrosis (like tumors) is most commonly found in hadrosaurids.

=== Locomotion ===
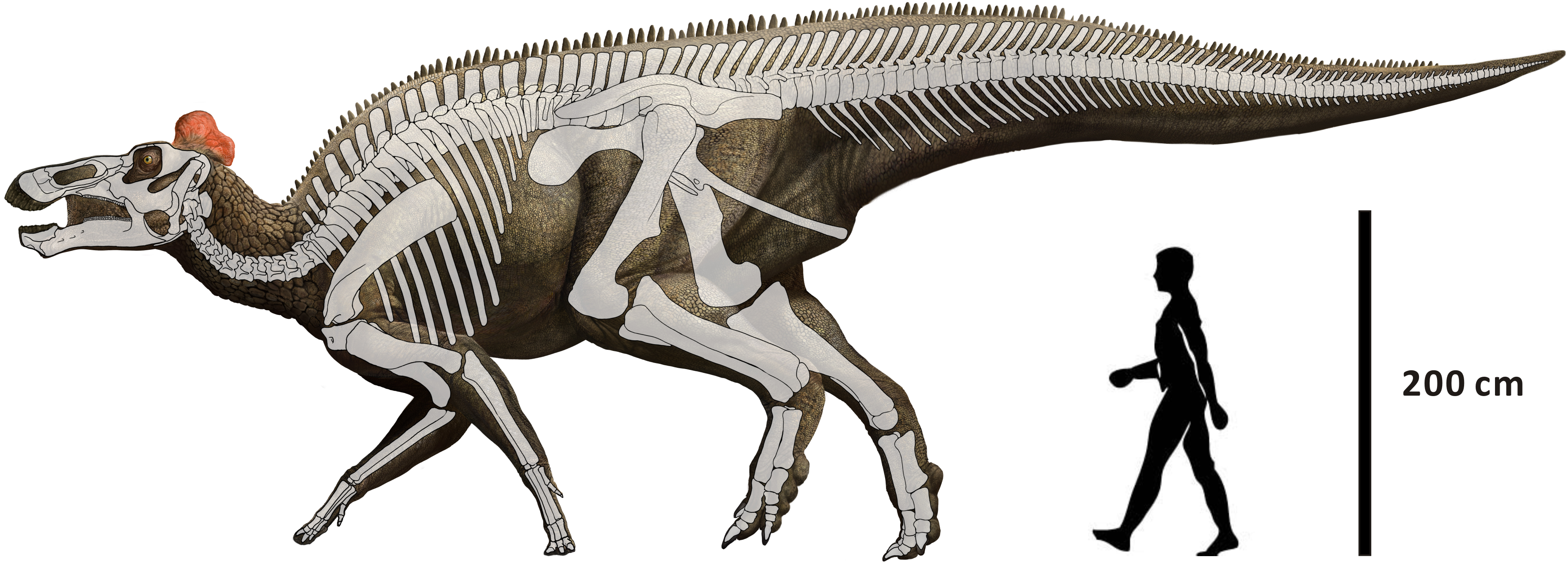
E. regalis in a quadrupedal pose.

Like other hadrosaurids, Edmontosaurus is thought to have been a facultative biped, meaning that it mostly moved on four legs, but could adopt a bipedal stance when needed. It probably went on all fours when standing still or moving slowly, and switched to using the hind legs alone when moving more rapidly. Research conducted by computer modeling in 2007 suggests that Edmontosaurus could run at high speeds, perhaps up to 45 kilometres per hour (28 mph). Further simulations using a subadult specimen estimated as weighing 715 kilograms (1,576 lb) when alive produced a model that could run or hop bipedally, use a trot, pace, or single foot symmetric quadrupedal gait, or move at a gallop. The researchers found to their surprise that the fastest gait was kangaroo-like hopping (maximum simulated speed of 17.3 metres per second (62 km/h; 39 mph)), which they regarded as unlikely based on the size of the animal and lack of hopping footprints in the fossil record, and instead interpreted the result as indicative of an inaccuracy in their simulation. The fastest non-hopping gaits were galloping (maximum simulated speed of 15.7 metres per second (57 km/h; 35 mph)) and running bipedally (maximum simulated speed of 14.0 metres per second (50 km/h; 31 mph)). Although they found 10 repeats to be insufficient for high-speed quadrupedal movement analysis, the paper highlights that a high-speed quadrupedal gait cannot be ruled out for hadrosaurs.

While long thought to have been aquatic or semiaquatic, hadrosaurids were not as well-suited for swimming as other dinosaurs (particularly theropods, who were once thought to have been unable to pursue hadrosaurids into water). Hadrosaurids had slim hands with short fingers, making their forelimbs ineffective for propulsion, and the tail was also not useful for propulsion because of the ossified tendons that increased its rigidity, and the poorly developed attachment points for muscles that would have moved the tail from side to side.

=== Social behavior ===
Extensive bone beds are known for Edmontosaurus, and such groupings of hadrosaurids are used to suggest that they were gregarious, living in groups. Three quarries containing Edmontosaurus remains are identified in a 2007 database of fossil bone beds, from Alberta (Horseshoe Canyon Formation), South Dakota (Hell Creek Formation), and Wyoming (Lance Formation). One edmontosaur bone bed, from claystone and mudstone of the Lance Formation in eastern Wyoming, covers more than a square kilometre, although Edmontosaurus bones are most concentrated in a 40 hectares (0.15 sq mi) subsection of this site. It is estimated that disassociated remains pertaining to 10,000 to 25,000 edmontosaurs are present here.

Unlike many other hadrosaurids, Edmontosaurus lacked a bony crest. It may have had soft-tissue display structures in the skull, though: the bones around the nasal openings had deep indentations surrounding the openings, and this pair of recesses are postulated to have held inflatable air sacs, perhaps allowing for both visual and auditory signaling. Edmontosaurus may have been dimorphic, with more robust and more lightly built forms, but it has not been established if this is related to sexual dimorphism.

Edmontosaurus has been considered a possibly migratory hadrosaurid by some authors. A 2008 review of dinosaur migration studies by Phil R. Bell and Eric Snively proposed that E. regalis was capable of an annual 2,600 kilometres (1,600 mi) round-trip journey, provided it had the requisite metabolism and fat deposition rates. Such a trip would have required speeds of about 2 to 10 kilometres per hour (1 to 6 mph), and could have brought it from Alaska to Alberta. In contrast to Bell and Snively, Anusuya Chinsamy and colleagues concluded from a study of bone microstructure that polar Edmontosaurus overwintered.

== Paleoecology ==
=== Distribution ===
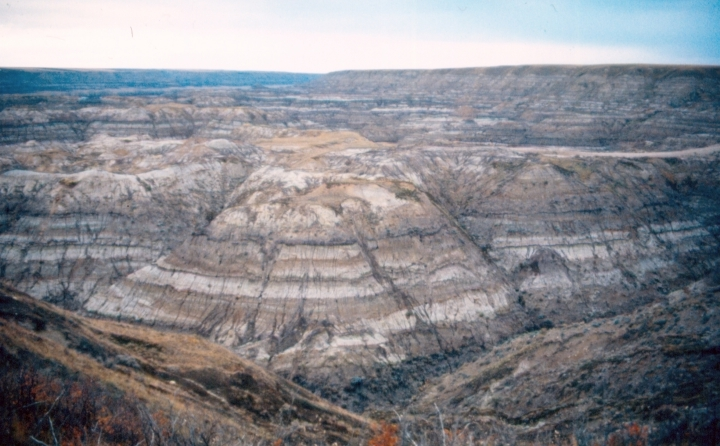
Horseshoe Canyon Formation near Drumheller. The dark bands are coal seams.

Edmontosaurus was a wide-ranging genus in both time and space. At the southern range of its distribution, the rock units from which it is known can be divided into two groups by age: the older Horseshoe Canyon and St. Mary River formations, and the younger Frenchman, Hell Creek, and Lance formations. The time span covered by the Horseshoe Canyon Formation and equivalents is also known as Edmontonian, and the time span covered by the younger units is also known as Lancian. The Edmontonian and Lancian time intervals had distinct dinosaur faunas. At its northern range, Edmontosaurus is known from a single locality; the Liscomb Bonebed of the Prince Creek Formation.

The Edmontonian land vertebrate age is defined by the first appearance of Edmontosaurus regalis in the fossil record. Although sometimes reported as of exclusively early Maastrichtian age, the Horseshoe Canyon Formation was of somewhat longer duration. Deposition began approximately 73 million years ago, in the late Campanian, and ended between 68.0 and 67.6 million years ago. Edmontosaurus regalis is known from the lowest of five units within the Horseshoe Canyon Formation, but is absent from at least the second to the top. As many as three quarters of the dinosaur specimens from badlands near Drumheller, Alberta may pertain to Edmontosaurus.

=== Ecosystem ===
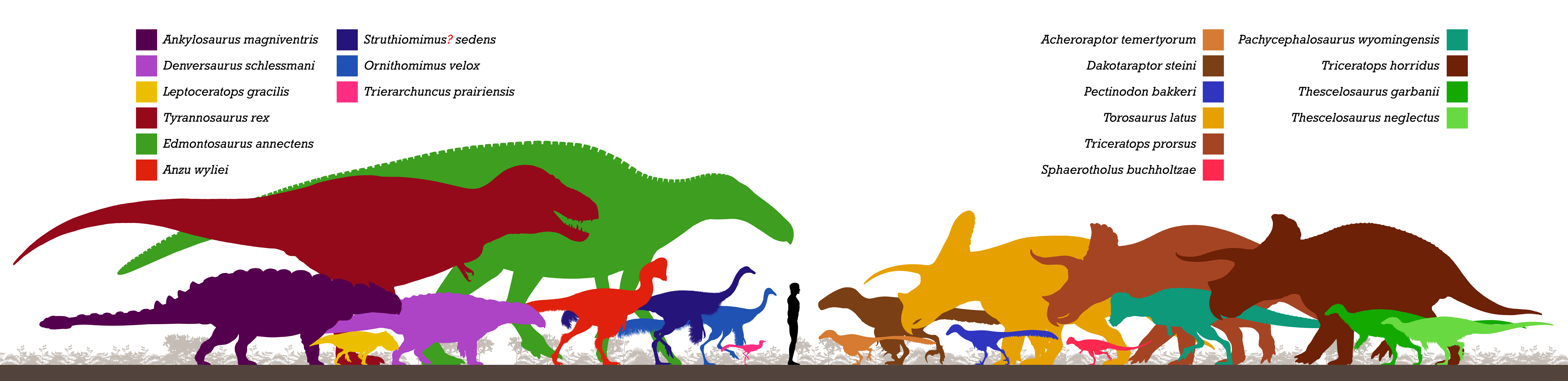
E. annectens (in green, left) compared to other dinosaur paleofauna from the Hell Creek Formation.

The Lancian time interval was the last interval before the Cretaceous–Paleogene extinction event that eliminated non-avian dinosaurs. Edmontosaurus was one of the more common dinosaurs of the interval. Robert T. Bakker reported that it made up one-seventh of the large dinosaur sample, with most of the rest (five-sixths) made up of the horned dinosaur Triceratops. The coastal plain Triceratops–Edmontosaurus association, dominated by Triceratops, extended from present-day Colorado to Saskatchewan.

The Lance Formation, as typified by exposures approximately 100 kilometres (62 mi) north of Fort Laramie in eastern Wyoming, has been interpreted as a bayou setting similar to the Louisiana coastal plain. It was closer to a large delta than the Hell Creek Formation depositional setting to the north and received much more sediment. Tropical araucarian conifers and palm trees dotted the hardwood forests, differentiating the flora from the northern coastal plain. The climate was humid and subtropical, with conifers, palmettos, and ferns in the swamps, and conifers, ash, live oak, and shrubs in the forests. Freshwater fish, salamanders, turtles, diverse lizards, snakes, shorebirds, and small mammals lived alongside the dinosaurs. Small dinosaurs are not known in as great of abundance here as in the Hell Creek rocks, but Thescelosaurus once again seems to have been relatively common. Triceratops is known from many skulls, which tend to be somewhat smaller than those of more northern individuals. The Lance Formation is the setting of two edmontosaur "mummies".

=== Predator-prey relationships ===
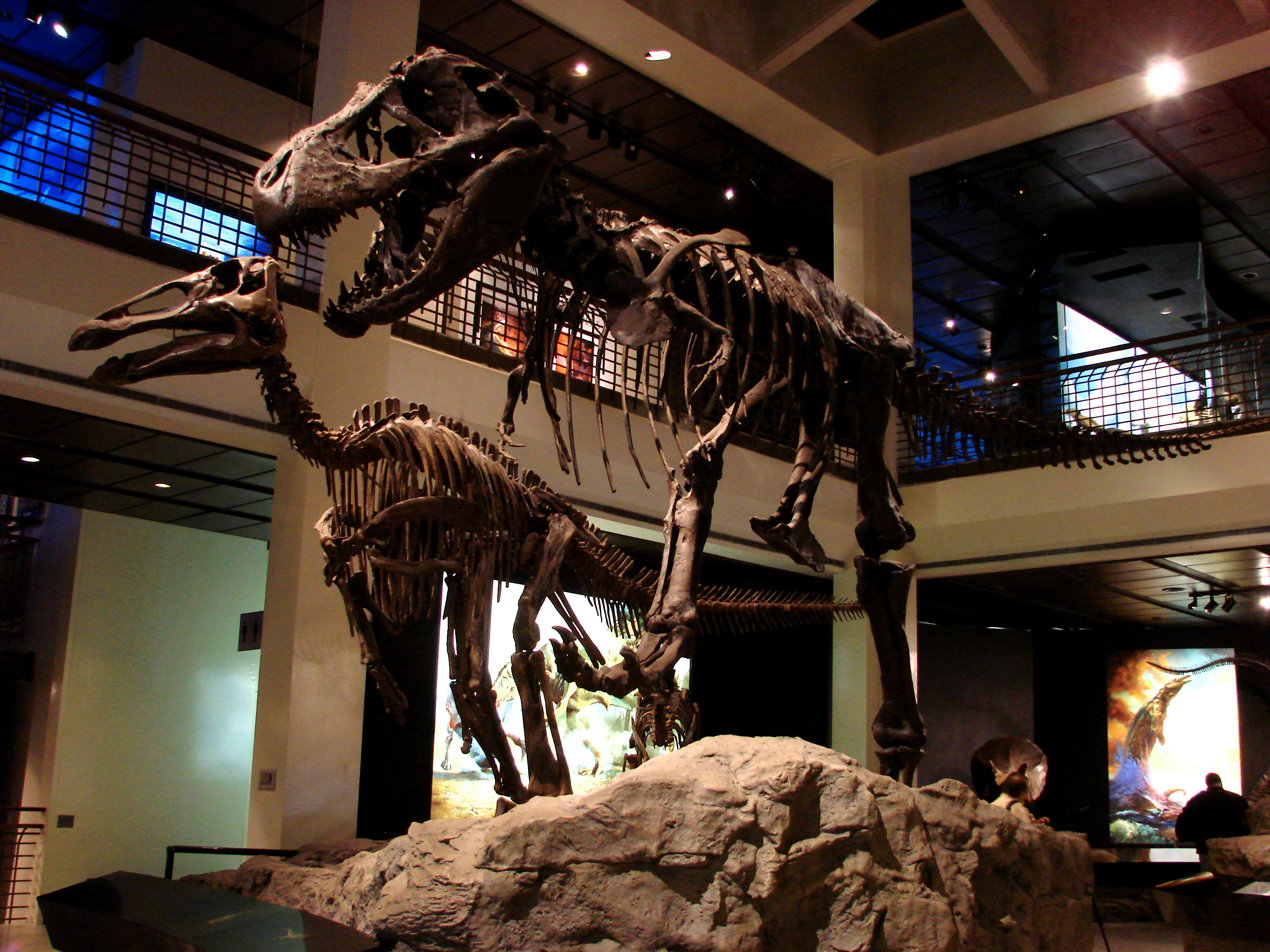
E. annectens mounted as being hunted by a Tyrannosaurus, which would have preyed on the species in life

The time span and geographic range of Edmontosaurus overlapped with Tyrannosaurus, and an adult specimen of E. annectens on display in the Denver Museum of Nature and Science shows evidence of a theropod bite in the tail. Counting back from the hip, the thirteenth to seventeenth vertebrae have damaged spines consistent with an attack from the right rear of the animal. One spine has a portion sheared away, and the others are kinked; three have apparent tooth puncture marks. The top of the tail was at least 2.9 metres (9.5 ft) high, and the only theropod species known from the same rock formation that was tall enough to make such an attack is T. rex. The bones are partially healed, but the edmontosaur died before the traces of damage were completely obliterated. The damage also shows signs of bone infection. Kenneth Carpenter, who studied the specimen, noted that there also seems to be a healed fracture in the left hip which predated the attack because it was more fully healed. He suggested that the edmontosaur was a target because it may have been limping from this earlier injury. Because it survived the attack, Carpenter suggested that it may have outmaneuvered or outrun its attacker, or that the damage to its tail was incurred by the hadrosaurid using it as a weapon against the tyrannosaur. However, more modern studies dispute the idea of an attack but rather other factors unrelated to an attack from a tyrannosaur.

Another specimen of E. annectens, pertaining to a 7.6 metres (25 ft) long individual from South Dakota, shows evidence of tooth marks from small theropods on its lower jaws. Some of the marks are partially healed. Michael Triebold, informally reporting on the specimen, suggested a scenario where small theropods attacked the throat of the edmontosaur; the animal survived the initial attack but succumbed to its injuries shortly thereafter. Some edmontosaur bone beds were sites of scavenging. Albertosaurus and Saurornitholestes tooth marks are common at one Alberta bone bed, and Daspletosaurus fed on Edmontosaurus and fellow hadrosaurid Saurolophus at another Alberta site. However more recent studies suggest that any and all evidence for Daspletosaurus being present in the Horseshoe Canyon Formation is referrable to Albertosaurus.

A 2026 paper reported a specimen of E. annectens with a tyrannosaurid tooth embedded in the nasal around the time of death of the animal's death, interpreted as likely resulting from a bite to the snout of the animal during a predation attempt.

== See also ==
- Timeline of hadrosaur research
