= Charles Sternberg =

Charles Sternberg may refer to:

- Charles Hazelius Sternberg (1850–1943), American fossil collector and amateur paleontologist
- Charles Mortram Sternberg (1885–1981), American-Canadian palaeontologist, son of the above
