= Edmontosaurus mummy AMNH 5060 =

Exceptionally well-preserved fossil in the American Museum of Natural History

AMNH 5060
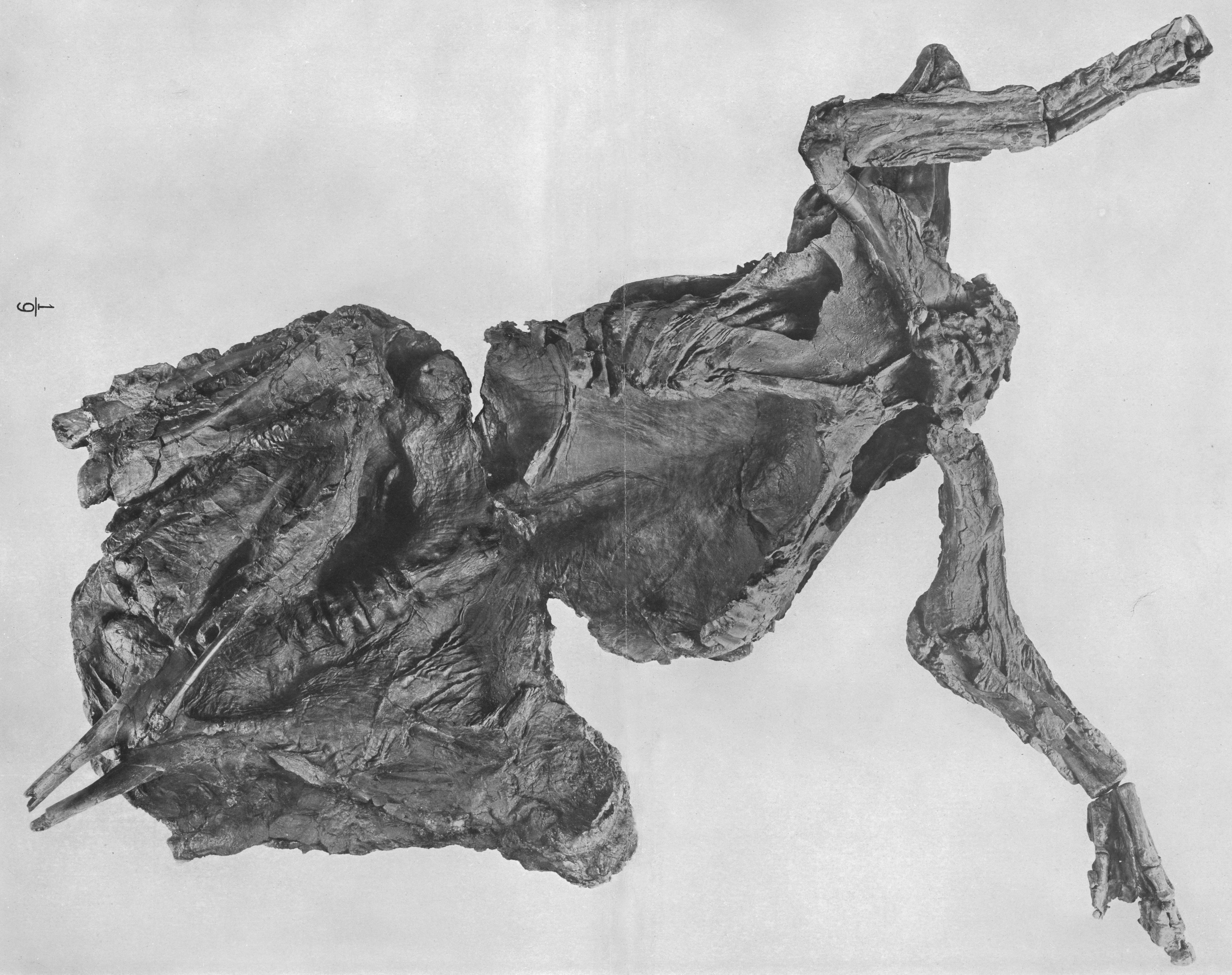
- The Edmontosaurus mummy AMNH 5060 at the American Museum of Natural History, New York, in top view
- Catalog no.: AMNH 5060
- Species: Edmontosaurus annectens
- Age: c. 67 million years
- Place discovered: Wyoming, United States
- Date discovered: August 1908
- Discovered by: George and Levi Sternberg

The Edmontosaurus mummy AMNH 5060, nicknamed the AMNH mummy, is an exceptionally well-preserved fossil of a dinosaur in the collection of the American Museum of Natural History (AMNH). Discovered in 1908 in the United States near Lusk, Wyoming, it was the first dinosaur specimen to be found encased in skin impressions. (Note: Although commonly referred to as "skin impressions", the skin is not preserved as an impression but as a thin layer of clay coating a biofilm (bacterial layer) that formed around the body, recording the external texture of the skin and other soft tissues before they decayed. The skin itself is not preserved.) It is ascribed to the species Edmontosaurus annectens (originally known as Trachodon annectens), a hadrosaurid ("duck-billed dinosaur"). The mummy was found and excavated by fossil hunter Charles Hazelius Sternberg and his three sons in the Lance Formation. Although Sternberg was working under contract to the Natural History Museum, London, Henry Fairfield Osborn of the AMNH managed to secure the mummy. Osborn described the fossil in detail in 1912, coining the name dinosaur mummy for it—several dinosaur mummies of similar preservation have been discovered since then. This specimen has considerably influenced the scientific conception of hadrosaurids. Skin impressions found in between the fingers were initially interpreted as webbing, bolstering the now-rejected perception of hadrosaurids as aquatic animals. Today, the mummy is considered one of the most important fossils of the AMNH.

The mummy was discovered lying on its back, its neck twisted backwards and its forelimbs outstretched. The skeleton is complete save the tail, hind feet, and the hind portion of the pelvis. All bones are preserved unflattened and still connected to each other. Almost two-thirds of the skin is preserved. Delicate for the size of the animal, the skin includes two different types of non-overlapping scales that were between 1 and 5 mm (0.039 and 0.197 in) in diameter. A flexible frill of skin is preserved in the neck area. In contrast with other similar dinosaur mummies, the skin of AMNH 5060 was tightly attached to the bones and partially drawn into the body interior, indicating that the carcass dried out before burial. The specimen would thus constitute the fossil of a natural mummy. After dehydration, the mummy likely would have been rapidly buried by a meandering river and rapidly filled with sediment. After burial, a thin clay layer would have formed on the skin, preserving the external shape of the latter.

== Discovery ==
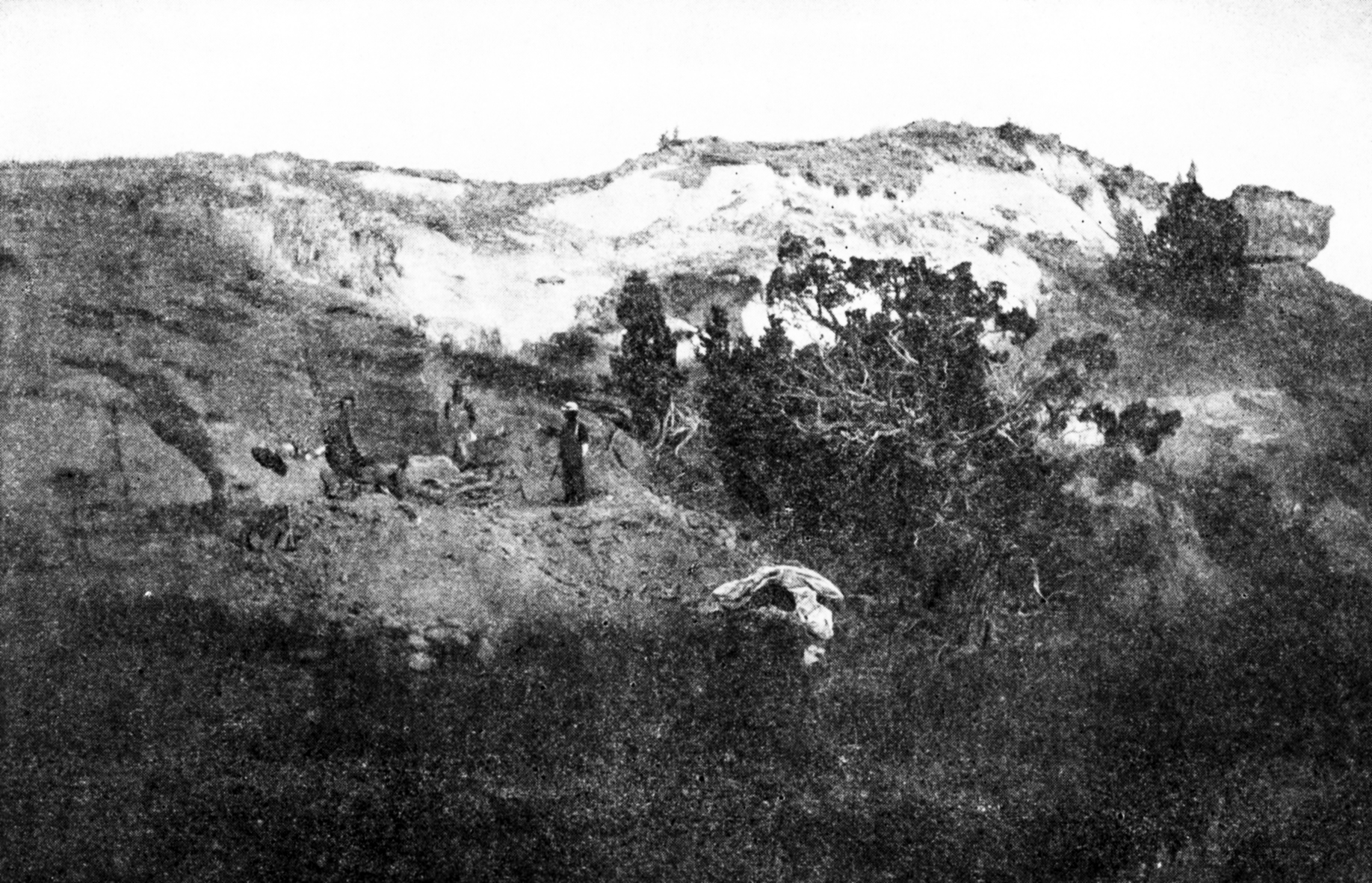
Only known photograph of the mummy's excavation, Wyoming, 1908, 43°23′09″N 104°31′39″W

The mummy was discovered and excavated in August 1908 by Charles Sternberg and his three sons George, Charles Jr. and Levi. An independent fossil collector, Sternberg earned a living by selling his finds to museums in North America and Europe. The sons worked as assistants for their father, and later became renowned paleontologists. Early in 1908, Sternberg planned an expedition to the Lance Creek area in eastern Wyoming, where the family had not worked before. In search of acquirers of potential fossil finds, he wrote to the Natural History Museum, London, that he knew where in Wyoming to find a skull of the horned dinosaur Triceratops, knowing that the museum was lacking a good specimen; the museum agreed to buy any good fossil finds if such were made. The Sternbergs left their family residence in Kansas in early spring, and arrived in the Lance Creek area in July. Sternberg's plan foresaw the exploration of an uninhabited area of approximately 1,000 sq mi (2,600 km^{2}) north to the North Platte River and south to the Cheyenne River in Converse County (today Niobrara County). The predominant badlands of this area expose sedimentary rocks of the Maastrichtian stage of the Upper Cretaceous, which today are known as the Lance Formation. The area had already been intensively explored by paleontological expeditions; before the start of his expedition, Sternberg learned that the American Museum of Natural History had been unsuccessfully working in the area for years.

Although the party was enthusiastic (Sternberg's sons had never discovered dinosaur fossils before), the first weeks of search were unsuccessful. Sternberg wrote in his 1909 book The Life of a Fossil Hunter:

Day after day hoping against hope we struggled bravely on. Every night the boys gave answer to my anxious inquiry, What have you found? Nothing.

At the end of August, Sternberg finally discovered a fossil horn weathering out of the rock; subsequent excavation revealed a 19 cm (7.5 in) long Triceratops skull. Soon after, George, the oldest son, found bones sticking out of the rock while prospecting new territory near Boggy Creek with Levi, the youngest son. Levi discovered more bones nearby, apparently belonging to the same skeleton. By then, the group had traveled 65 mi (105 km) from their base camp, and food was running short. Sternberg instructed George and Levi to carefully remove the sandstone above the skeleton, and Sternberg himself set off for Lusk with Charles Jr. to purchase new supplies and to initiate the shipping of the Triceratops skull to the Natural History Museum, London. The third day after their father's departure, George and Levi recognized that they had found an apparently complete skeleton lying on its back. When removing a large piece of sandstone from the chest region of the specimen, George discovered, to his surprise, a perfectly preserved skin impression. In 1930, George remembered:

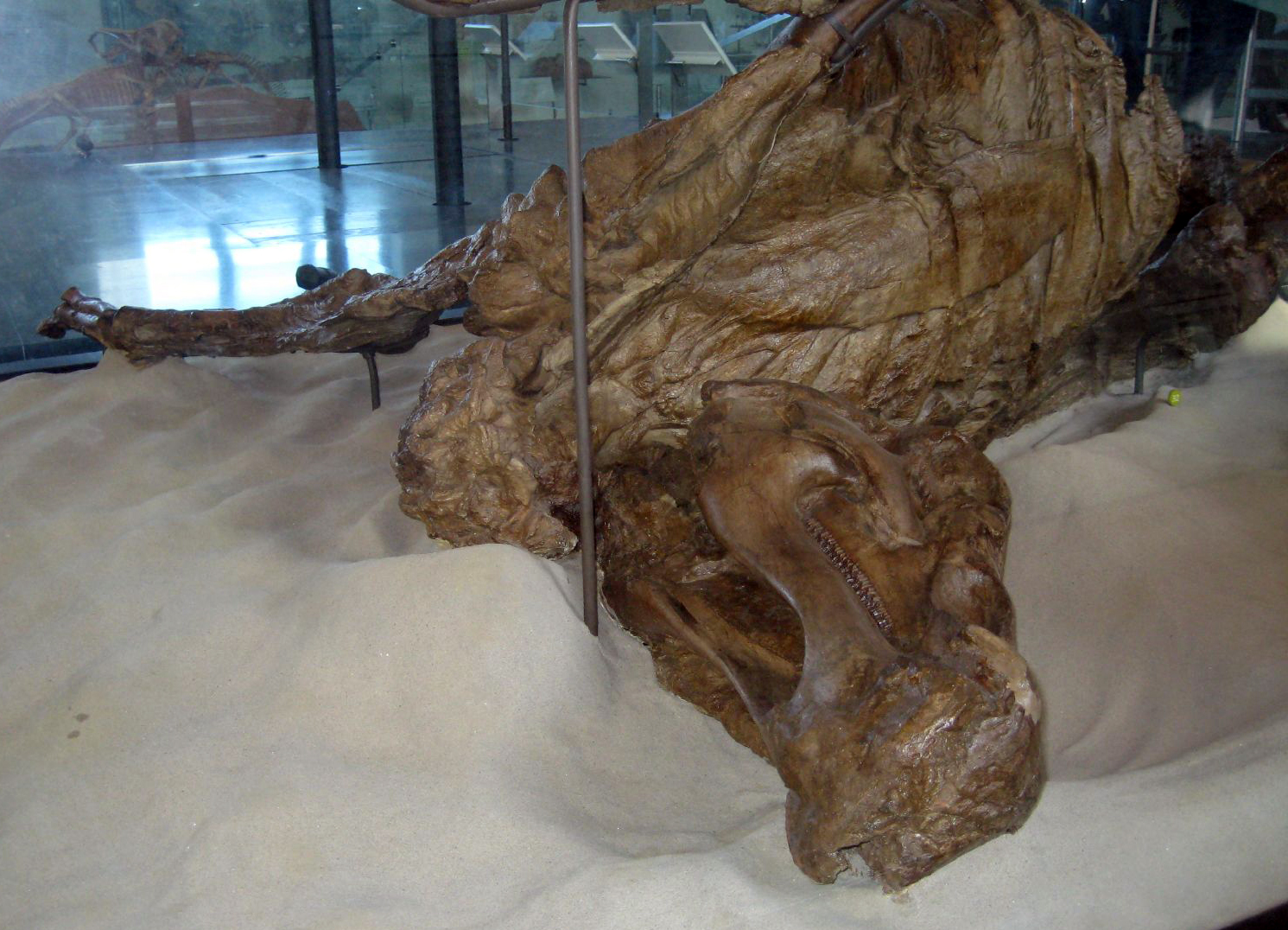
The mummy on exhibit in the American Museum of Natural History (2008)

Imagine the feeling that crept over me when I realized that here for the first time a skeleton of a dinosaur had been discovered wrapped in its skin. That was a sleepless night for me.

When Sternberg finally returned at the fifth day, George and Levi had run out of food, and had only eaten potatoes for the previous two days. Nevertheless, they had exposed the skeleton; the dig measured 3.6 m (12 ft) in width, 4.5 m (15 ft) in length and 3 m (9.8 ft) in depth.

When paleontologist Henry Fairfield Osborn, manager of the American Museum of Natural History, learned about the new find, he immediately sent staff member and paleontologist Albert Thomson, to attempt to secure it for the museum. Osborn knew about the agreement between Sternberg and the Natural History Museum, London, which gave the latter rights to acquire any of the finds; he appealed to Sternberg's patriotism and promised permanent exhibition of the fossil. When Thomson arrived, he was unable to evaluate the fossil as it had already been wrapped in burlap and shellac for transport, yet the asking price of $2,000 (equivalent to $71,667 in 2025) was high. On the same day as Thomson, William Holland, director of the Carnegie Museum of Natural History, arrived at Lusk. Osborn, now worried about losing his opportunity, quickly acquired the specimen for an unknown sum.

At the American Museum, preparation of the skin impressions was completed by preparator Otto Falkenbach. Subsequently, the mummy was scientifically described by Osborn himself and the famous paleontologist Barnum Brown in three articles published in 1911 and 1912, and afterwards was put on display. In the exhibition, the mummy, protected by a glass showcase, is shown lying on its back as it was discovered; the museum decided not to restore missing parts. Today, the mummy is regarded as one of the museum's most important fossils. It is cataloged under the specimen number AMNH 5060.

== Significance and classification ==
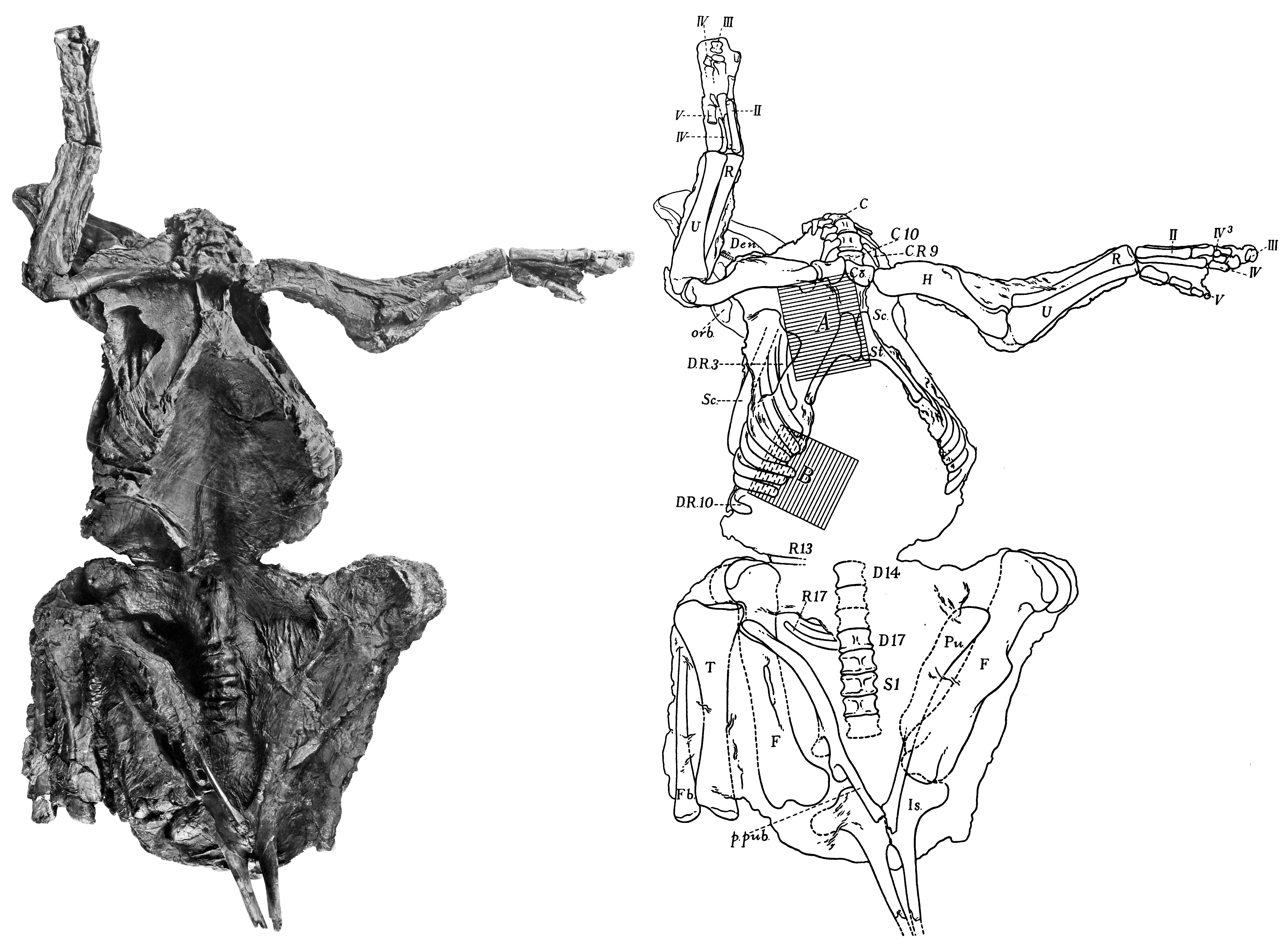
The mummy in bottom view, with outline drawing

AMNH 5060 is considered one of the best preserved dinosaur fossils ever discovered. The scientific value of the mummy lies in its exceptionally high degree of preservation, the articulation of the bones in their original anatomical position, and the extensive skin impressions enveloping the specimen. In 1911, Osborn concluded:

This truly wonderful specimen, therefore, nearly doubles our previous insight into the habits and life of a very remarkable group of reptiles.

As dinosaur skin impressions were previously known only from a few fragments, the mummy became a paleontological sensation. As noted by Osborn in 1912, the Trachodon skeleton AMNH 5730, found in 1884 by Jacob Wortman, originally also contained extensive skin impressions, but most had been destroyed during excavation, leaving only three fragments from the tail region. As explained by Osborn, the very thin layer containing the skin impressions in the stone is difficult to detect, and many such impressions might have been lost in previous years as they were not expected nor recognized by excavators.

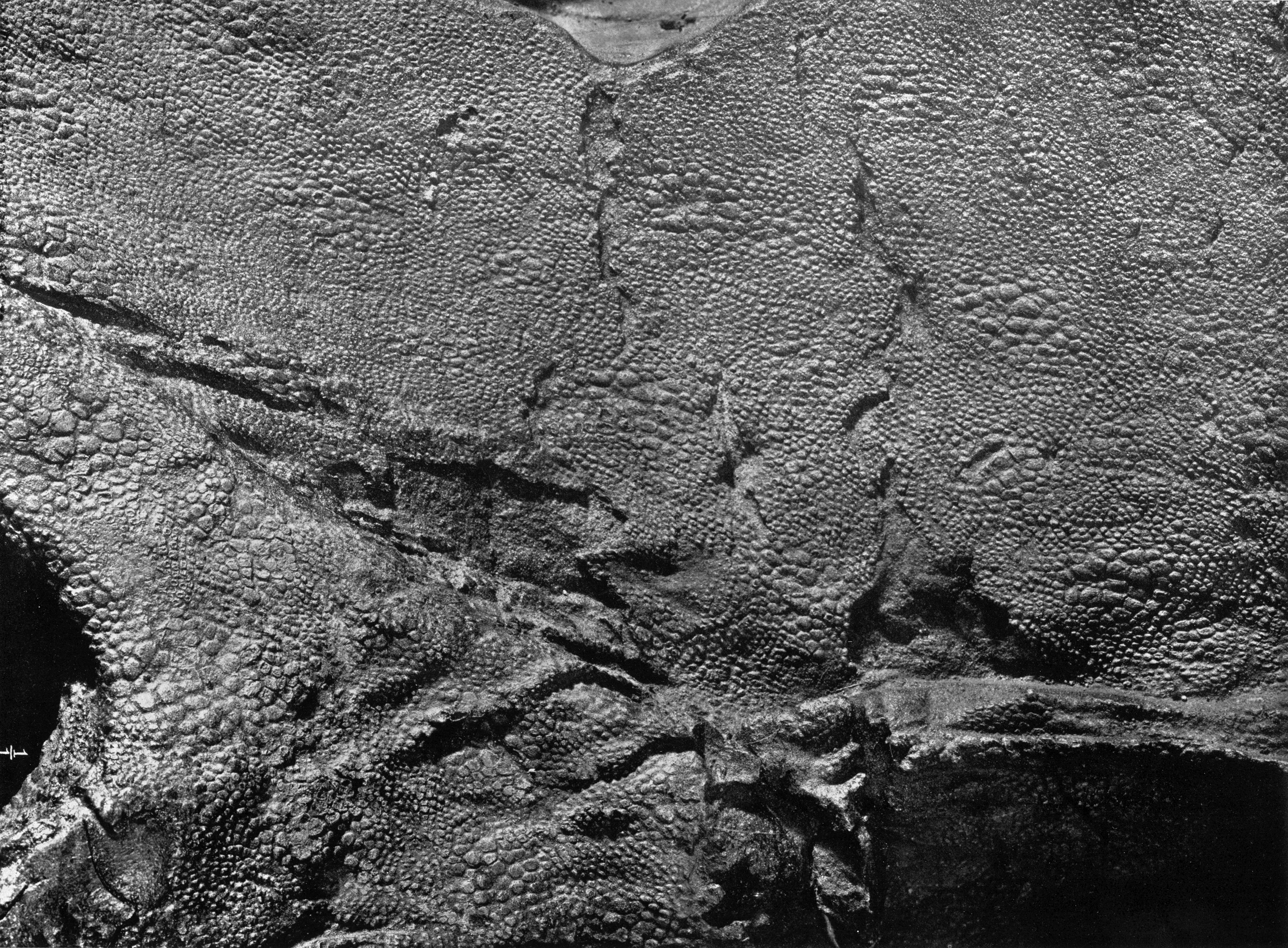
Skin impression of the shoulder region, showing the smaller "ground tubercles" and clusters of larger "pavement tubercles"

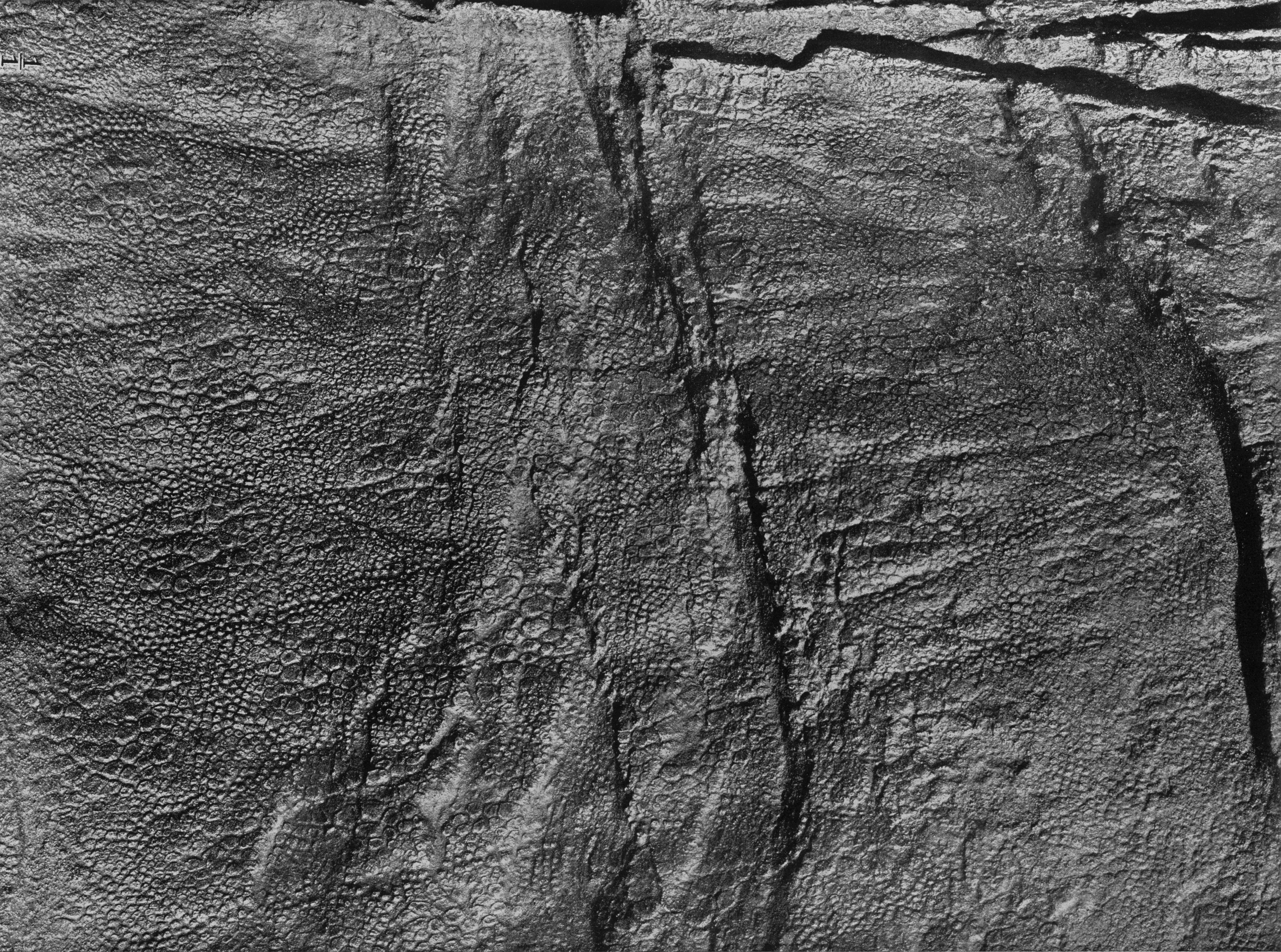
Skin impression from the abdomen of the mummy

In his 1911 description, Osborn coined the term dinosaur mummy for the specimen. This term was later used to refer to similar hadrosaurid ("duck-billed dinosaurs") specimens with extensive skin impressions, all of which have been discovered in North America. (Note: The term "mummy" has, in the context of dinosaurs, only been used informally. However, Sereno and colleagues, in 2025, formally defined the term "fossil mummy" to include any mostly intact fossil specimen that preserves extensive areas of integument such as skin or feathers and often shows signs of desiccation before burial.) The second such mummy, now in the Senckenberg museum in Frankfurt am Main, Germany, was discovered by the Sternbergs in 1910, just two years after the discovery of AMNH 5060. Although the skeleton of the Senckenberg mummy is more complete, it is less well preserved than AMNH 5060 in some other aspects. Another mummy specimen was discovered by Barnum Brown 1912 in Alberta, Canada, and subsequently described as the new genus Corythosaurus. Yet another mummy was discovered by Sternberg, which he sent to the Natural History Museum, London, during World War I. The transport ship, the SS Mount Temple, was sunk by a German raider ship in 1916, resulting in the loss of this mummy as well as many other fossils discovered by Sternberg. Additional mummies have been excavated since the turn of the millennium, such as a Brachylophosaurus mummy nicknamed "Leonardo" and an Edmontosaurus mummy nicknamed "Dakota". In 2025, Paul Sereno and colleagues described two additional Edmontosaurus mummies that had been discovered in 1998 and 2002, respectively, in the same area in which the Sternbergs found their first two mummies.

Gregory S. Paul, in 1987, stated that the life appearance of Edmontosaurus and Corythosaurus can be more accurately restored than that of any other dinosaur thanks to the well-preserved mummy specimens. Yet, evidence provided by AMNH 5060 was not regularly taken into account by paleoartists, possibly because it was described before World War I, during which activity in dinosaur research abated, only to be revitalized in the mid-1960s.

AMNH 5060 belongs within the Hadrosauridae, a family of ornithischian ("bird-hipped") dinosaurs. The mummy was initially identified as Trachodon annectens. At the time, the genus Trachodon encompassed nearly all known hadrosaurid specimens. In a 1942 monograph on North American hadrosaurs, Richard Swann Lull and Nelda E. Wright moved the species together with the mummy into the new genus Anatosaurus, as Anatosaurus annectens. In 1990, Michael K. Brett-Surman and Ralph Chapman decided that the species instead belongs within the genus Edmontosaurus, which was followed by subsequent reviews. The majority of dinosaur skin impressions are referable to the Hadrosauridae. In North American specimens from the Maastrichtian age, skin impressions are 31 times more abundant in association with hadrosaurid specimens than with any other group. The reasons for this distribution are unclear. Of all known hadrosaurid skin impressions, 25% belong to Edmontosaurus.

== Description and interpretation ==
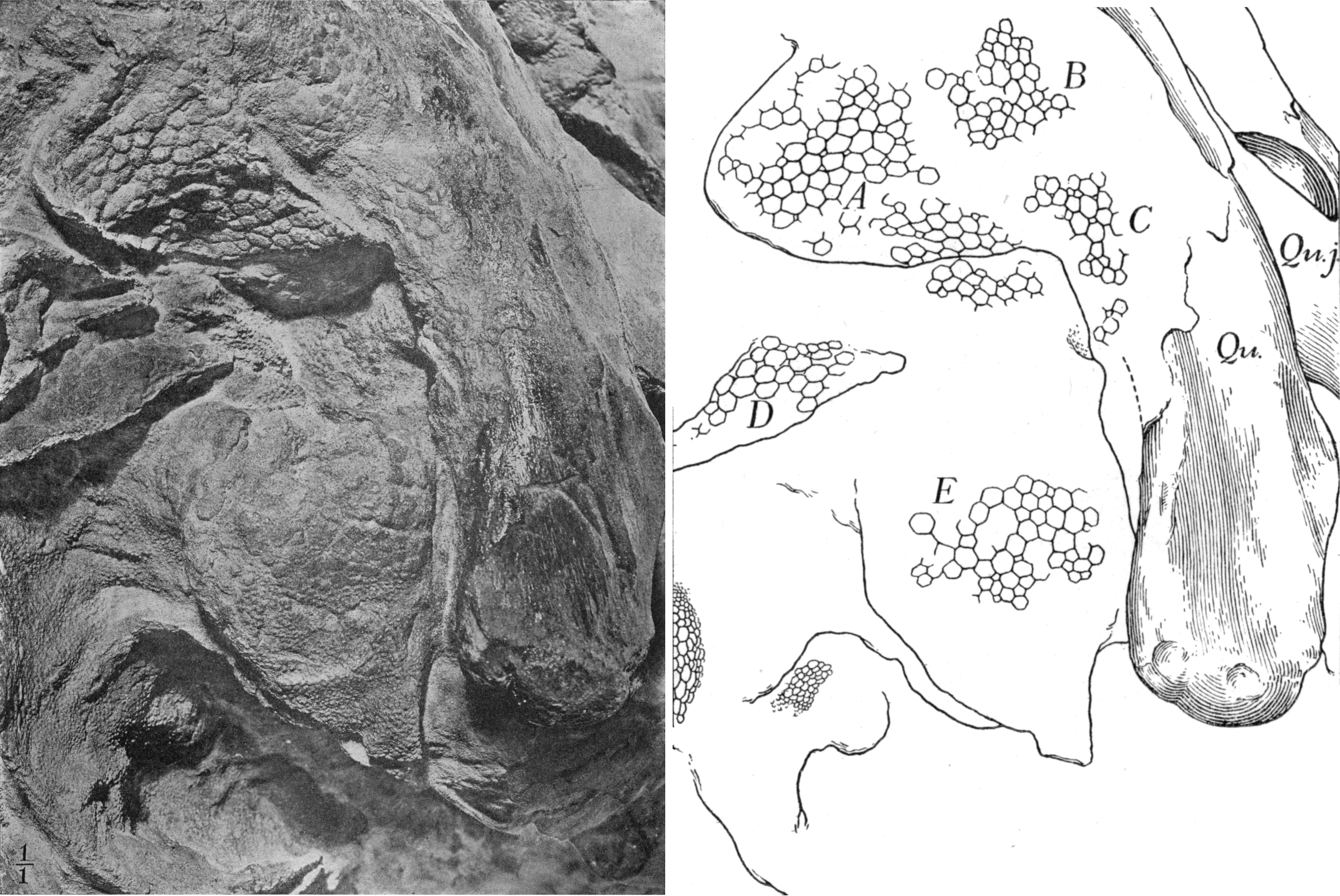
Skin impressions at the back of the head of the mummy

Most of the skeleton is preserved, the bones still attached to each other in their original anatomical position. The tail, hind feet, and hind portion of the pelvis had eroded away before the mummy was discovered. Fossils often become flattened during fossilization, but AMNH 5060 is preserved three-dimensionally, without significant deformation. The specimen was found lying on its back, with head and neck twisted upwards, backwards, and to the right side of the body. Both knees are drawn forwards, while the forelimbs are outstretched. Although the tail curves upwards and forwards over the body in many dinosaur skeletons, it was probably straight in the mummy as movement would have been restricted by ossified tendons. Almost two-thirds of the total skin area is preserved, often with excellent preservation. The skin impressions are pressed tightly onto the bones, and are partially drawn into the body in between the bones. When discovered, skin impressions probably encased the whole skeleton, but were partially destroyed while freeing it from the surrounding rocks. Skin impressions are preserved on the forelimbs, neck and throat, and the chest, as well as on the right side of the trunk. As well as the skin impressions, Sternberg noted the preservation of muscle impressions. In 2007, paleontologist Kenneth Carpenter suggested that even impressions of inner organs are possibly preserved; this cannot be evaluated without detailed computer tomography and x-ray analyses.

=== Skin ===
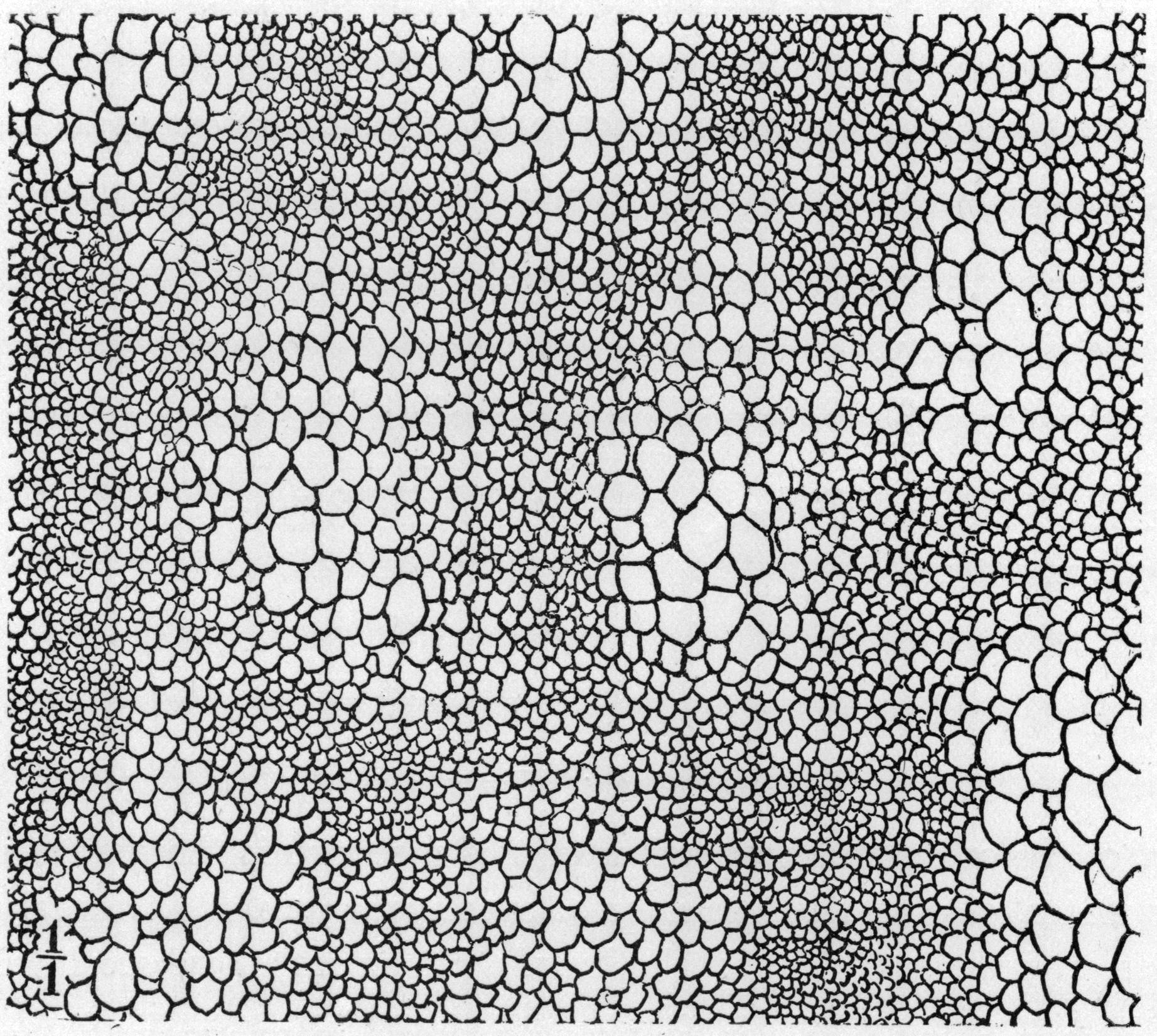
Drawing of skin impressions from the underside of the trunk

The skin was thin and delicate in relation to the size of the animal. As typical for dinosaurs, the skin consisted of non-overlapping scales called tubercles. Two sorts of tubercles can be distinguished. Evenly distributed on the skin were the "ground tubercles", which were small, rounded scales between 1 and 3 mm (0.039 and 0.118 in) in diameter. The larger "pavement tubercles", less than 5 mm (0.20 in) in diameter, were pentagonal in shape, raised relative to the ground tubercles, and arranged in irregular clusters interrupting the surface formed by the lower ground tubercles. These clusters consisted of between twenty and several hundred individual pavement tubercles, and were bordered by intermediate tubercles which mediated in size and shape between ground and pavement tubercles. In the chest and abdominal region, clusters were small, oval in shape and arranged in irregular longitudinal lines. They became larger towards the sides of the trunk, where they reached 5 to 10 cm (2.0 to 3.9 in) in diameter; their shape became more irregular. The largest clusters could be found above the pelvis and measured 50 cm (20 in) in diameter; clusters of similar size were presumably present along the whole back of the animal. Muscles and joints were generally occupied with smaller tubercles to enable greater flexibility—larger tubercles are found in those parts that are tightly pressed to the bones. The largest surviving scales are found on the outer side of the arms; these polygonal tubercles were up to 1 cm (0.39 in) in diameter. The inner side of the arms was completely covered by small tubercles. The thigh also showed relatively small tubercles on the inner side; no impressions of the outer side are preserved. A patch of skin is also present in the nostril region of the snout; these scales measured 3 to 5 mm (0.12 to 0.20 in) in diameter.

=== Skin frill ===
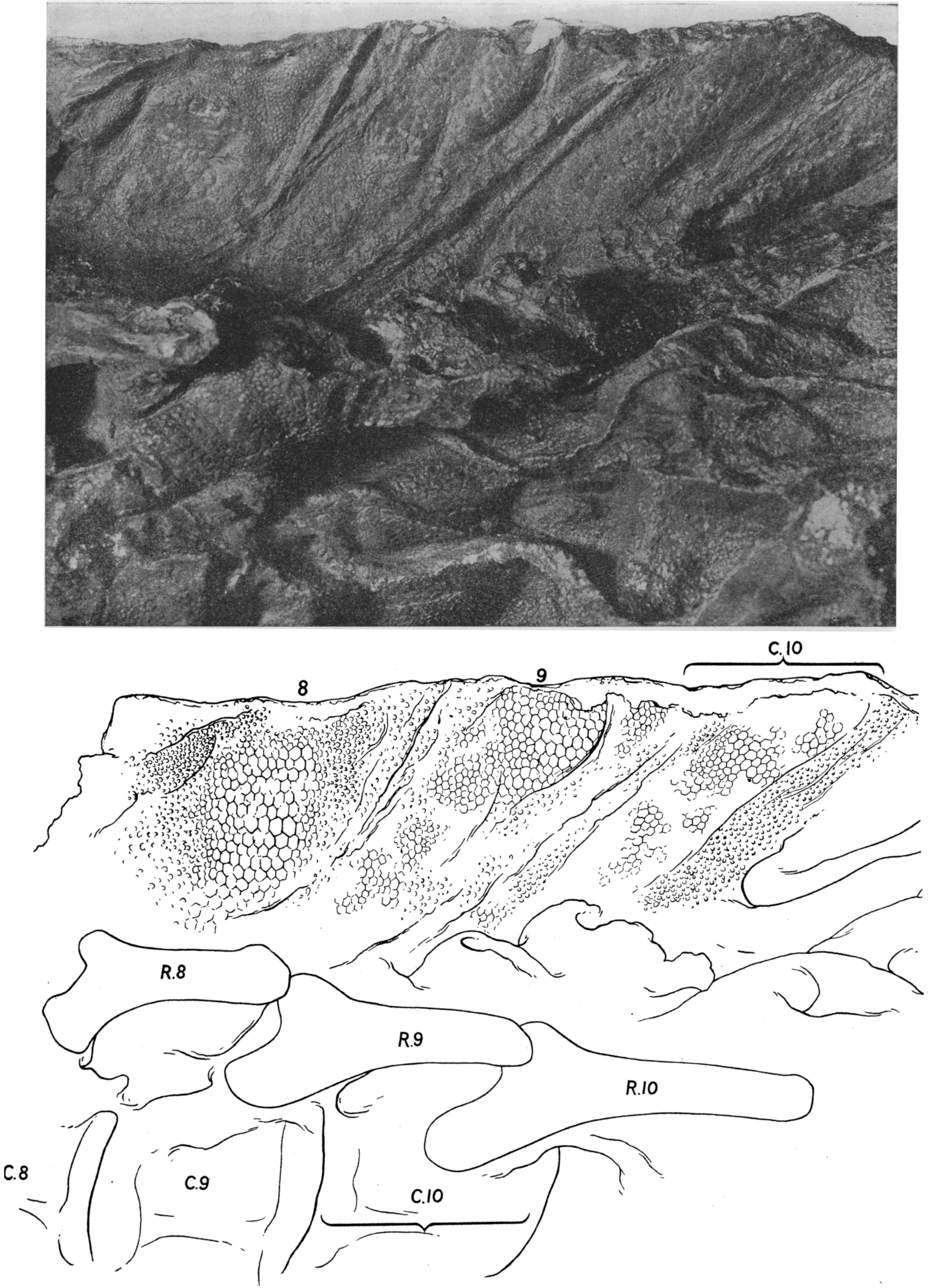
Proposed skin frill above the neck vertebrae, photograph and interpretive drawing

Above the neck vertebrae, a 25 cm (9.8 in) long and 7 to 8 cm (2.8 to 3.1 in) deep skin impression is preserved. Osborn interpreted this impression as part of an ornamental frill of loose skin that extended along the midline of the neck and back. Osborn noted that this frill was folded above the vertebral joints to ensure mobility of the neck, giving the comb a ruff-like appearance. The areas in-between the folded areas were occupied by an oval cluster of pavement tubercles. Osborn observed that the upper edge of the comb had been destroyed during the recovery of the mummy, so that the height of the crest can no longer be determined. He assumed that the frill would have extended upwards by at least one further row of clusters. An Edmontosaurus fossil described by the paleontologist John Horner in 1984 shows a regular row of broad spikes in the tail area. Stephen Czerkas, in 1997, argued that this row would likely have extended over much of the body, including the neck, making a frill of loosely folded skin seem unlikely. Instead, the skin impression described by Osborn would have come from the fleshy crest above the downward-curved neck spine. This neck crest would have been much deeper than previously assumed, connecting the base of the head to the shoulder region. The observed folding would have been a consequence of mummification and caused by a withered nuchal ligament. In 2025, Sereno and colleagues confirmed the presence of a skin frill based on two newly discovered Edmontosaurus mummies. These specimens show that the frill continued down the neck and trunk, grading into the row of spikes in the hip region. The frill was probably flexible in life.

=== Hand ===
AMNH 5060 allowed for the first accurate reconstruction of the hand skeleton of a hadrosaurid. Barnum Brown, in 1912, showed that the carpus of the mummy did not consist of two complete rows of ossified carpals, as Othniel Charles Marsh had assumed in his reconstruction of 1892, but that only two ossified carpals were present. In the mummy, these elements lie directly above each other and above the third metacarpal. This arrangement probably reflects the original position in the living animal since both hands show the same arrangement. Brown further pointed out that the first finger was missing and the second to fifth fingers each consisted of three phalanges. Marsh had reconstructed the first finger as a reduced element with only two phalanges, while the fifth finger was absent in his reconstruction.

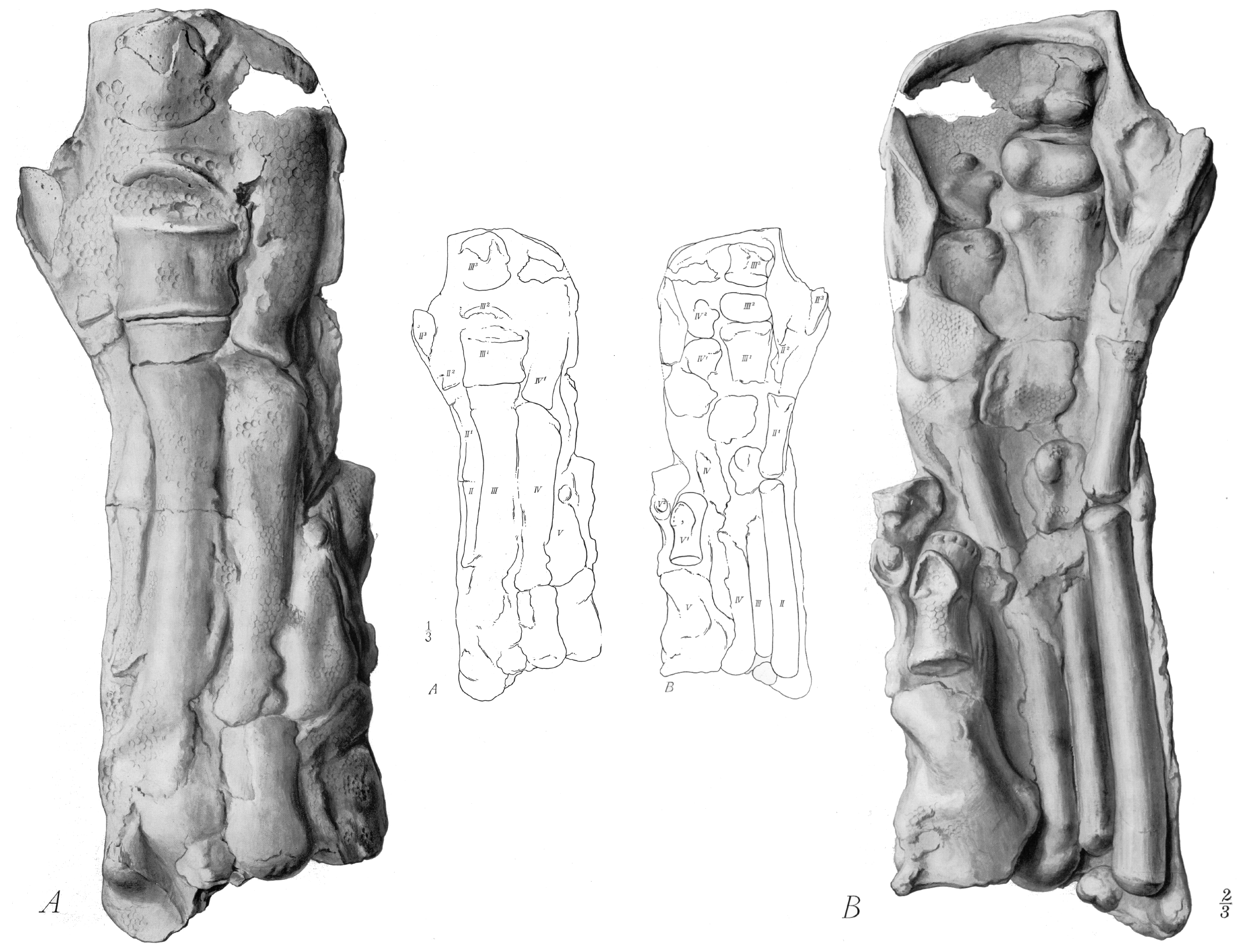
Drawing of the upper- (left) and underside (right) of the right hand, showing the metacarpal bones and fingers enclosed by the skin cover

The fingers of the mummy are partially connected to each other by an envelope of skin impressions. In 1912, Osborn suggested that this skin envelope represented webbing between fingers and that the forelimb would have functioned as a paddle, which he considered a clear indication of an aquatic lifestyle for Trachodon (= Edmontosaurus) and presumably other representatives of the Trachodontidae (= Hadrosauridae). The webbing would not only have connected the fingers with each other, but would also have extended up to 5 cm (2.0 in) beyond the fingertips. Furthermore, Osborn noted the lack of clearly pronounced hooves and large fleshy foot pads on the forelimb—features to be expected in a primarily land-dwelling animal. With the Senckenberg mummy, another Trachodon specimen with supposed webbing was discovered in 1910. A possible aquatic lifestyle of hadrosaurids had been proposed before, in particular based on the great depth and flat sides of a well-preserved tail discovered by Brown in 1906. This hypothesis appeared to be in accordance with an 1883 account by Edward Drinker Cope describing hadrosaurid teeth as "slightly attached" and "delicate", and therefore suitable for feeding on soft aquatic plants. It was only after the discovery of the two mummies that the hypothesis of an aquatic lifestyle became the undisputed doctrine. Charles H. Sternberg wrote in 1917:

I was reluctently giving up Marsh's and Cope's ideas; they believed these dinosaurs lived on land, feeding off the tender foliage of trees [...] Entirely different views are held now [...] These (the duck-bills) lived in the water instead on land, and consequently they had thin skin and strong paddles, or rather webbed feet.

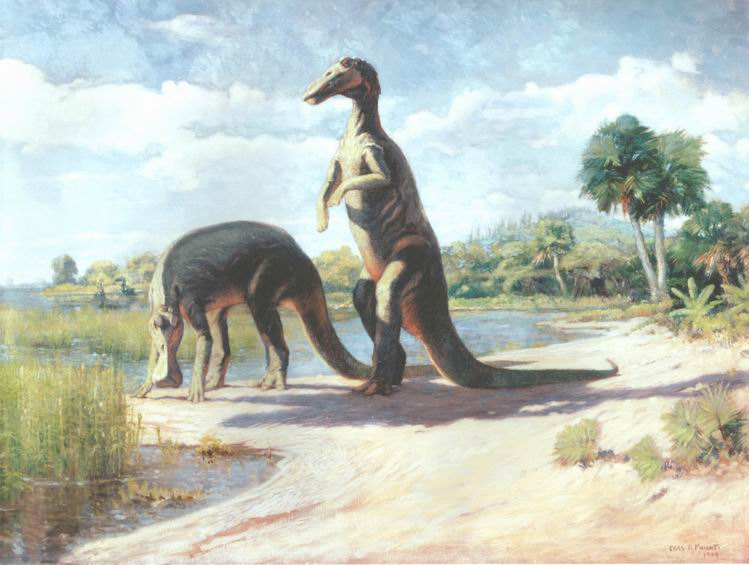
1909 reconstruction of Trachodon (Edmontosaurus) drawn by Charles R. Knight under supervision of Henry Fairfield Osborn. The fingers are shown to be joined into a paddle, as was inferred from the apparent interdigital webbing seen in the mummy.

It was not until 1964 that John Ostrom voiced doubts about the webbed-finger hypothesis. Ostrom was able to show that hadrosaurids did not feed on soft aquatic plants as previously assumed, but that their elaborate chewing apparatus was designed to crush resistant plant material such as conifers. The skeletal anatomy would furthermore indicate a highly specialized two-legged locomotion on land. Ostrom noted that hadrosaurids showed no osteoderms or similar structures to defend against predators that are found in many other herbivorous dinosaurs, and suggested that the webs may have been used to allow escape into the water in case of danger. Robert Bakker, in 1986, argued that the animal had no webs, and that the skin between its fingers was the remnant of a fleshy pad enveloping the hand that had dried out and flattened during mummification. Very similar skin structures originating from foot pads can be found on modern-day mummified camel carcasses. Furthermore, Bakker argued that the fingers were short and could hardly have been spread apart, which distinguishes them fundamentally from the long, spread toes of today's paddling animals such as ducks. Bakker concluded:

Far from being the best, the duckbills must have been the clumsiest and slowest swimmers in all the Dinosauria.

Today, the webbing hypothesis is widely refuted.

Phil Senter, in 2012, examined AMNH 5060 and several other hadrosaurid specimens to reconstruct the orientation of the hand. While trackway evidence indicates that the palm was directed inwards and only slightly backwards, many hadrosaurid skeletons have instead been mounted with the palm of the hand facing backwards. In such reconstructions, the radius either crosses the ulna (instead of being parallel) or connects to the inner of the two condyles of the humerus (instead of to the outer). Although the palms of the mummy face backwards, this is because the carcass lay on its back, which caused the forelimbs to sprawl and the humeri to detach from the shoulder joints. In both forelimbs of the mummy, radius and ulna are parallel to each other and the radius is connected to the outer condyle, confirming that the palm must have faced inwards in life.

=== Ossified tendons and stomach contents ===
In 1909, Charles H. Sternberg noted that hundreds of ossified tendons were preserved along the dorsal spine, each about as thick as a pencil. Sternberg speculated that these tendons served as defensive structures and could not be penetrated by the claws of predatory dinosaurs such as the contemporary Tyrannosaurus. Today it is known that these tendons stiffened the spine, probably to counteract bending forces on the spine during walking. Although the tail is not preserved in the mummy, other Edmontosaurus specimens show that it had also been stiffened by such tendons.

Sternberg also reported carbonized food remains discovered in the stomach region of the mummy. An analysis of these remains has not yet been performed. In 1922, the paleobotanist Richard Kräusel studied a mass of brown plant material in the body cavity of the Senckenberg mummy that consisted mainly of branches and needles of conifers. These remains are now thought to have been washed into the cadaver, and the same could be true for the plant remains in the AMNH mummy.

=== Attempts to reconstruct color patterns ===
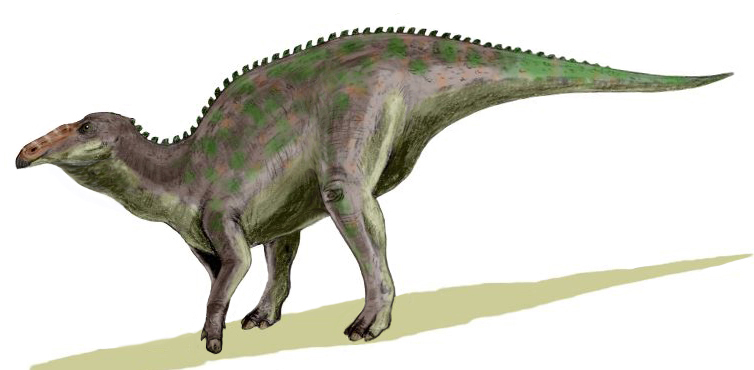
Modern reconstruction of Edmontosaurus annectens

Osborn observed in 1912 that clusters of "pavement tubercles" were more numerous on the upper sides of the trunk and limbs than on the underside. Consequently, they would dominate in areas that would have been exposed to the sun when the animal was alive; in many reptiles living today, these sun-exposed areas contain the most pigment. From these observations, Osborn hypothesized a connection between pigmentation and scaling: the "pavement tubercle" clusters might have represented dark-colored areas on a bright base; the irregular distribution of the clusters would indicate an irregular color pattern; and the most elaborate color pattern would be present on the skin frill of the neck. Osborn did admit that in today's lizards the distribution of pigments is largely independent of the type of scaling.

Catherine Forster, in 1997, stated that color information can in principle not be derived from the skin impressions of dinosaur mummies. In 2015, Philip Manning and colleagues concluded that skin in dinosaur mummies is not simply preserved as an impression but contains organic compounds, either biomolecules or their breakdown products. These researchers inferred the presence of melanin pigments in the skin of another Edmontosaurus mummy nicknamed Dakota. While clarifying that a reconstruction of the coloration is currently not possible given the many different factors that influence coloration, they remarked that the melanin distribution may potentially allow for deriving a monochrome (black-and-white) picture of the animal's pigmentation pattern. Any chemical analysis of AMNH 5060 would be problematic, however, as consolidating chemicals have been applied to its skin for preservation. In their 2025 study, Sereno and colleagues found no evidence of organic compounds in the skin of two new mummies from the Lance Formation, and suggested that the same is likely the case in other mummies from the formation, including the AMNH and Senckenberg mummies.

=== Nostrils ===
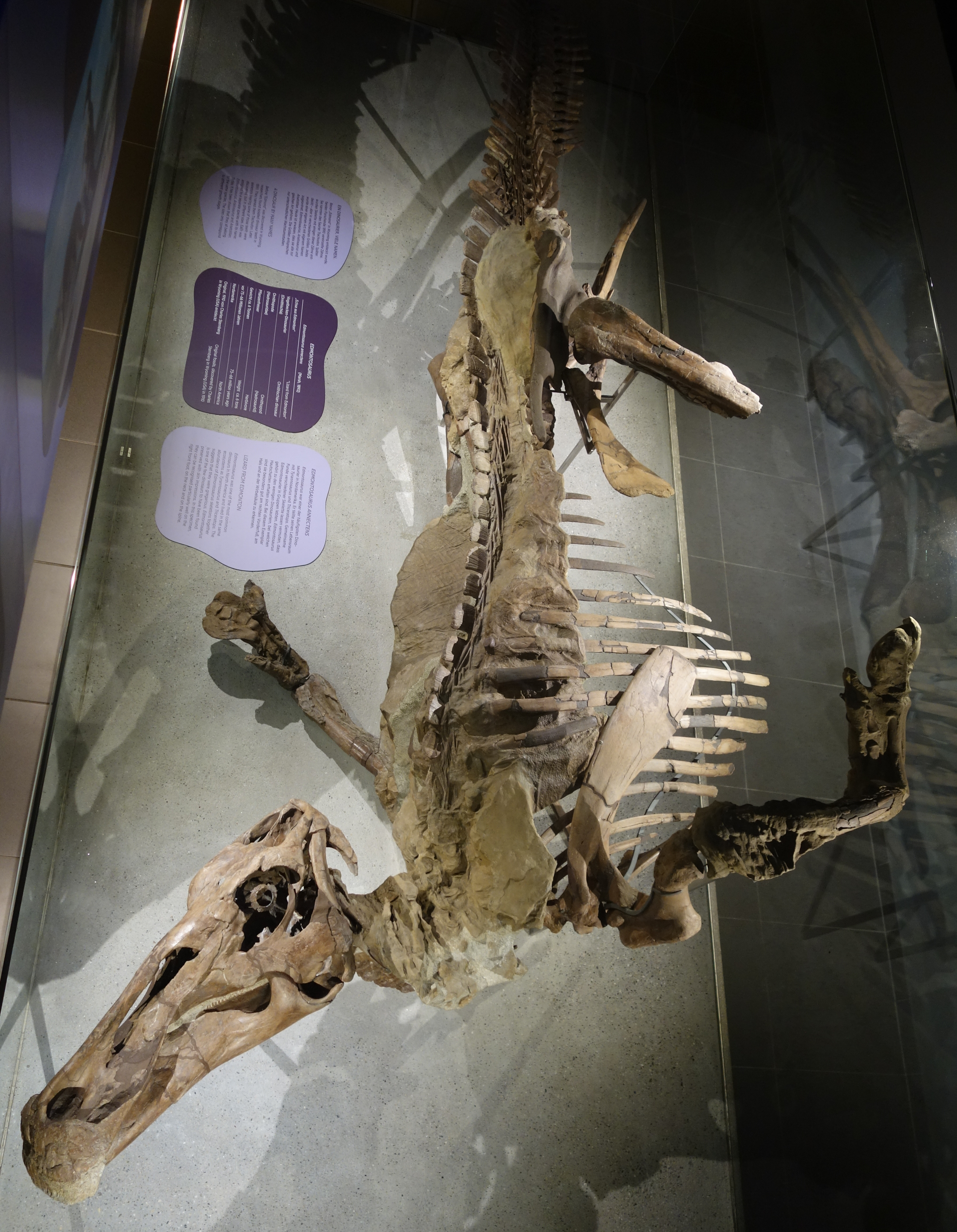
The Senckenberg mummy (on exhibition in the Senckenberg Museum in Frankfurt am Main, Germany)

As in other Edmontosaurus specimens, the sides of the snout were excavated by a large and elongated depression, the circumnarial depression, which housed the nostrils. As confirmed by AMNH 5060, the fleshy nostril would not have occupied the entire depression. Richard Swann Lull and Nelda Wright, in a 1942 publication, suggested that skin impressions are preserved within the depression; a deepening in this possible skin in the front part of the depression could mark the position of the fleshy nostrils. This skin is smooth and wrinkled and tubercles are absent, in contrast with the rest of the body. Accordingly, paleoart often shows the remainder of the depression being occupied by a scaleless, inflatable bladder. In 2015, however, Albert Prieto-Márquez and Jonathan Wagner found low and subtle impressions of polygonal scales in the frontmost part of the depression behind the beak. These scales suggest that the rest of the skin that once covered the depression might have been scaly. For this reason, these authors preferred an older interpretation by James A. Hopson from 1975, who proposed a scaly bladder with brightly colored skin between the scales which became visible only when the bladder was inflated.

Prieto-Márquez and Wagner further suggested that sedimentary ridges within the depression likely represent former soft-tissue structures. The rear edge of the bony nostril was extended towards the front by a flange which was probably a cartilaginous structure, indicating that the rear part of the bony nostril was covered by soft tissue, forming a nasal cavity. As this covering was apparently restricted to the rear part, it is likely that the opening of the nasal passage into the skull interior would also have been situated there. A ridge running diagonally across the depression might have been a cartilaginous septum supporting a nasal cavity. The ridge ends in the lower front of the depression, which is the most likely location for the fleshy nostril. The nasal cavity that this ridge once supported would therefore have been the main nasal air passage.

== Taphonomy ==
=== Death and burial ===
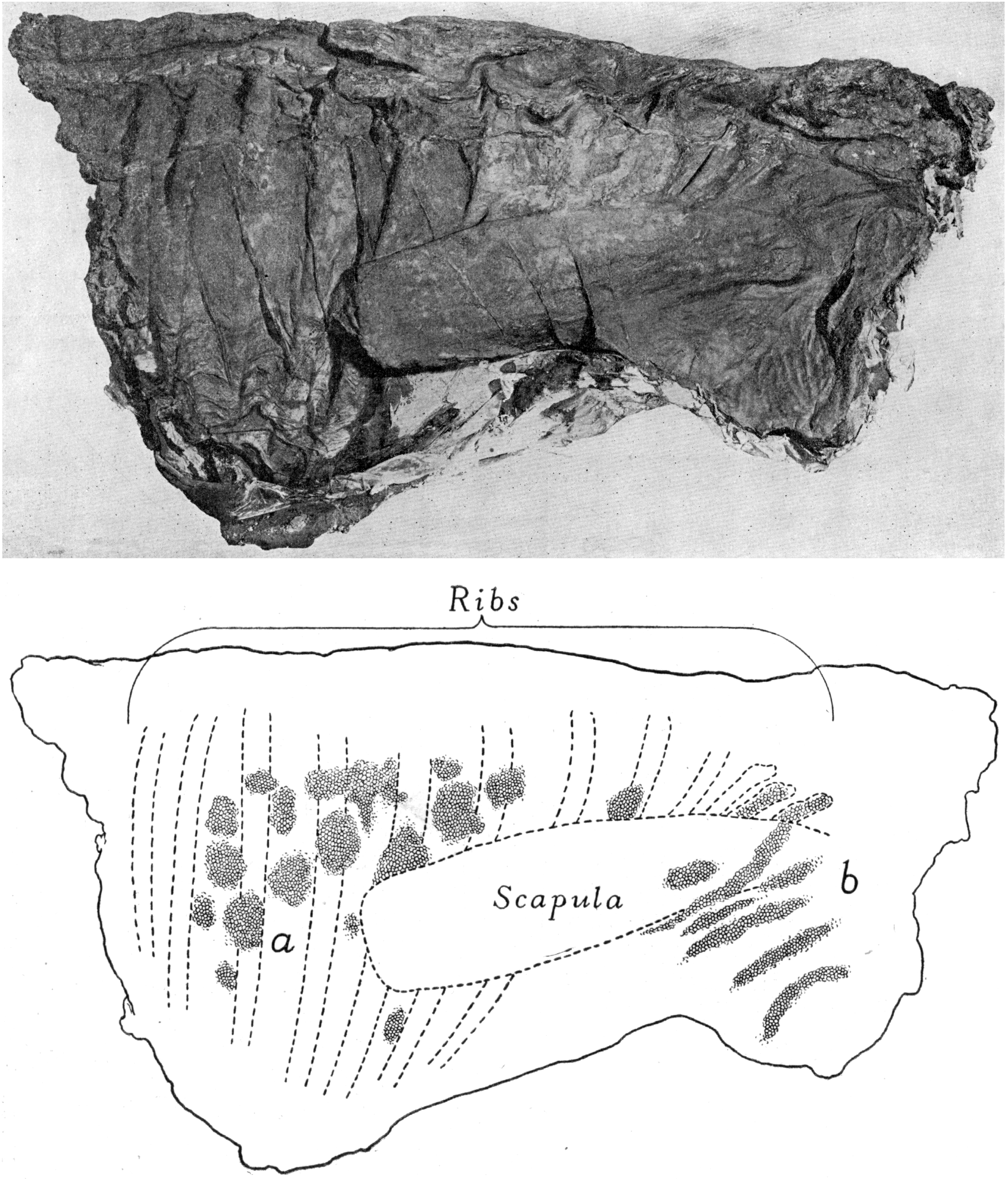
Thorax region of the mummy showing skin impressions that tightly adhere to the bones

Several authors discussed the question of how the animal died and what circumstances led to its exceptionally good preservation. Charles H. Sternberg, in 1909, and Charles M. Sternberg, in 1970, assumed that the animal died in water. The gases accumulating in the abdomen after death would have floated the carcass, with the belly pointing upwards and the head moving into its final position under the shoulder. The carcass would then have sunk to the bottom to come to rest on its back, and become covered by sediments. The skin would have been drawn into the body cavity by the load of the sediments or due to the escape of the gases. Osborn suggested another scenario in 1911: the animal could have died a natural death, and the carcass would have been exposed to the sun for a longer time in a dry riverbed, unaffected by scavengers. Muscles and intestines would have completely dried out and thus shrunk, whereby the hard and leathery skin sank into the body cavity and finally adhered tightly to the bones, forming a natural mummy. At the end of the dry season, the mummy would have been hit by a sudden flood, transported a distance and quickly covered with sediments at the embedding site. The fine grain size of the sediment (fine river sand with sufficient clay content) would have led to the perfect impressions of the filigree skin structures before the hardened skin could soften.

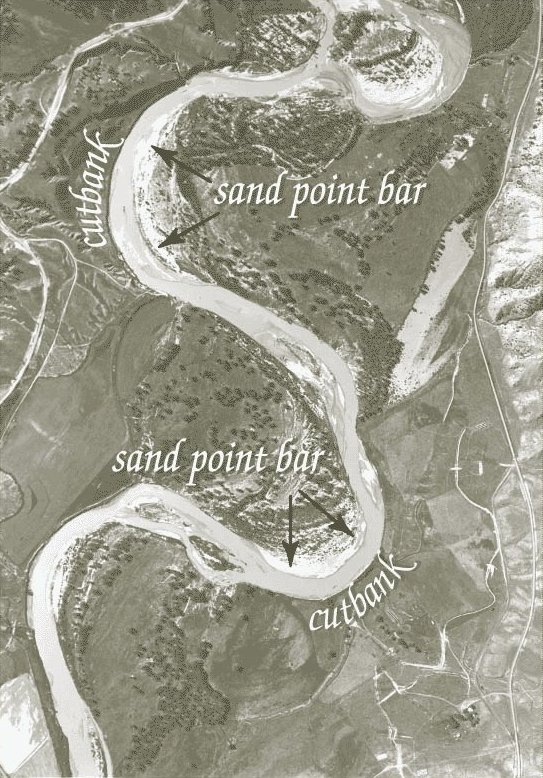
Aerial photograph of a meandering river, showing the sliding slopes (sand point bar) on the inside and the impact slopes (cutbank) on the outside of the river loops

The cause of death of the specimen can only be speculated about. Kenneth Carpenter, in 1987 and 2007, considered starvation during a drought to be the most likely cause of death, given the similarity of the mummy to cadavers of today's animals found during droughts. The loss of muscle mass due to malnutrition could also partly explain why the mummy's skin was sunken around the bones. Furthermore, the carcass was not affected by scavengers. This could have been due to a drought keeping scavengers away from the affected area or leading to an overabundance of carcasses that could not all be handled by the existing scavengers, as can be observed during modern droughts. Furthermore, Carpenter noted that today's large even-toed ungulates are closely bound to water during droughts to prevent overheating. The main cause of death of these animals during droughts is starvation, not thirst. The mummy was discovered in river sediments; therefore the animal likely died near a river or at least a dry riverbed. In their 2025 study, Sereno and colleagues argued that the muscles did not dry out, as suggested by Osborn and Carpenter, but disappeared due to decay. This is indicated by the fact that the skin is shrunken onto the bones even in areas where substantial muscle mass would have been present.

Carpenter argued that the sediments of the discovery site were deposited by a meandering river. This type of river constantly migrates its riverbed by eroding the cut bank (the bank on the outside of the river bends) and depositing sediment on the slip-off slope (on the inside of the bends). A slip-off slope forms a characteristic sediment sequence known as a point bar. Carpenter concluded from a photograph taken during the excavation that the mummy was discovered within such a point bar, and suspected that the carcass was embedded during flood events after the end of a drought. The carcass would have been an obstacle for the current, resulting in its rapid burial: as water flowed around the carcass, its velocity would have increased, leading to a removal of sediment. The carcass would have successively sunk into the resulting depression. Additional sediment that led to further burial would have originated from cut banks collapsing into the river further upstream, which is indicated by the high clay content of the sandstones. The sediment load carried by the river would have been deposited as current velocity, and thus carrying capacity, diminished, which is the case at the end of a flood. The carcass would have been embedded within hours or days. Sereno and colleagues suggested that burial took place within one or several weeks after death.

Sereno and colleagues noted that six dinosaur mummies were found within an area of only 10 km (6.2 mi) in diameter, which they dubbed the "mummy zone". These mummies include the AMNH mummy, the Senckenberg mummy, two other Edmontosaurus mummies nicknamed "Ed Jr." and "Ed Sr.", the Triceratops specimen "Lane", and the Tyrannosaurus specimen "Rex Jr.". These authors argue that the mummy zone was an area of rapid subsidence (downward movement of the Earth's surface) that resulted in high sedimentation rates, and was subjected to pronounced cycles of droughts and subsequent floods. The combination of these factors would have resulted in the exceptional abundance of mummies. These authors also argued that Edmontosaurus mummies are comparatively common because this genus preferred habitats closer to the coast where sedimentation rates were higher, while Triceratops tends to occur father inland.

=== Preservation after burial ===
The taphonomic processes that affected the mummy after its burial are difficult to reconstruct as samples from the surrounding sedimentary rocks do not exist. According to Carpenter, a slow bacterial decay of the carcass would have occurred first. Carpenter emphasized that the excellent preservation of the fossil was made possible only by minerals formed by bacteria (biomineralization). These minerals would have solidified the clay-rich sand surrounding the mummy, resulting in its unusual three-dimensional preservation. At the same time, this solidified sediment would have preserved the skin impressions at the contact surface between sand and cadaver. The mineralization furthermore anchored the bones in their anatomical position and thus prevented them from falling apart as the soft tissue decayed. Important minerals formed after burial would include calcium carbonate (calcite) and iron carbonate (siderite); the latter, after being oxidized to limonite, would have been responsible for the rusty color of the mummy. After the more or less complete decomposition of the soft tissue, a cavity remained in the cemented sediment that was subsequently filled with sand, together with the skin impression it contained.

Sereno and colleagues, based on other mummies found in the area, instead suggested that sediment would have quickly entered through holes in the cadaver directly after burial, filling the body cavity and therefore preserving the three-dimensional shape of the body. A biofilm (layer of microorganisms) would then had formed on the outer surface of the body and accumulated clay minerals from the surrounding sediment due to electrostatics, forming a thin clay layer that is less than 1 mm (0.039 in) in thickness. This clay layer retained the shape of the skin in positive relief even after the decay of the latter. Therefore, Sereno and colleagues argued that the skin is actually not preserved as an impression and instead should be termed a rendering, and, more specifically, a template (or mask).
