= Levi Sternberg =

American paleontologist

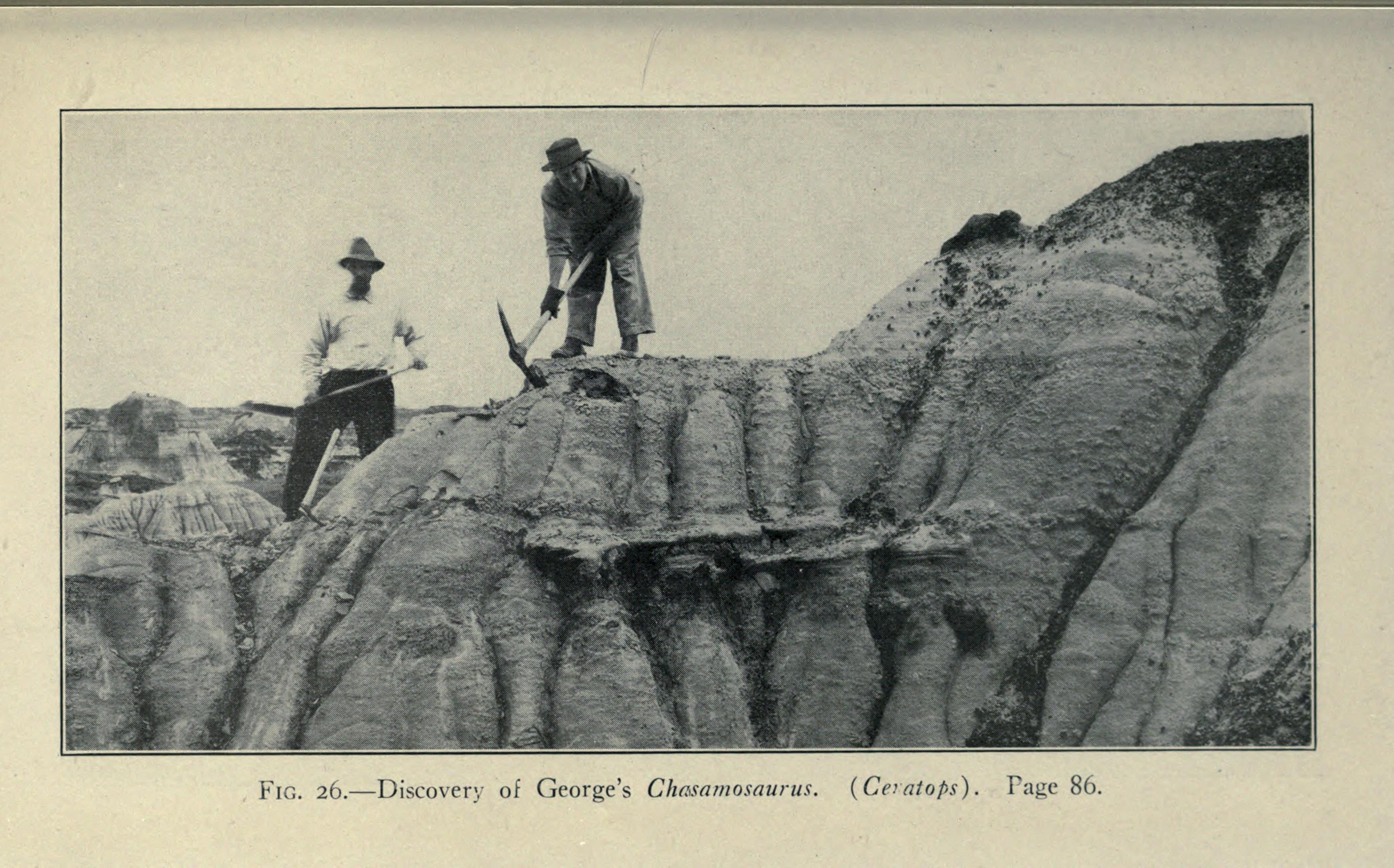
- Levi (center) and George (left) Sternberg in the Alberta badlands
- Born: March 10, 1894; Lawrence, Kansas, United States
- Died: October 21, 1976 (aged 82); Toronto, Ontario, Canada
- Known for: Paleontology
- Spouse: Anne Lindblad
- Parent(s): Charles Sternberg; Anna Reynolds

Levi Sternberg (March 10, 1894 – October 21, 1976) was an American-Canadian fossil collector and paleontologist, son of Charles Sternberg and brother of George and Charles Sternberg.

== Early life and family ==
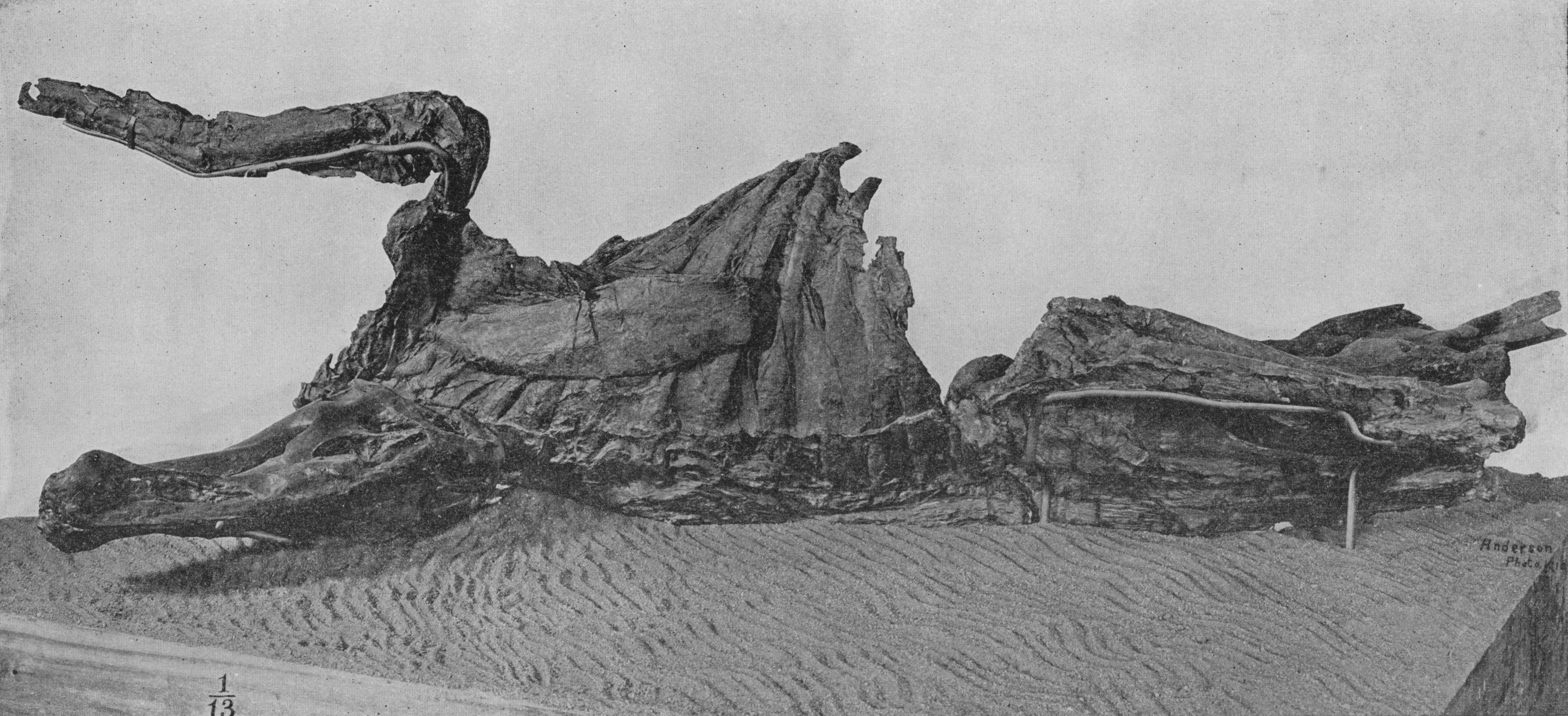
Mummified Edmontosaurus found by Levi and George in 1908

Levi Sternberg was born in 1894 at a farm near Lawrence, Kansas to Charles H. Sternberg and Anna Reynolds, the youngest of the three brothers to survive into adulthood. In 1902 the family moved off the farm into the town, visiting the fossil sites of the Niobrara Chalk in 1906 when Levi Sternberg was 11. Charles H. Sternberg felt that his sons were sufficiently ready to join him in his fossil collecting profession full time by 1908, when George was 23, Charles was 23, and Levi was 14. As a family the Sternbergs went to Wyoming, with Levi working as an excavator and helping to lift the heavy bones. This expedition took three field seasons to complete, with Sternbergs returning to Lawrence each winter. In August 1908, Levi and George discovered the skull of a Triceratops along Schneider Creek, and later a skeleton of Edmontosaurus including skin, which would become known as a mummified dinosaur. Returning from the expedition, Levi Sternberg completed high school at Lawrence High School.

Levi then returned to expeditions with Charles H. and Charles M., returning to Wyoming and contributing many discoveries, including hundreds of skulls of Oreodon in 1911. In 1912, Levi joined the other Sternbergs on an expedition to the Red Deer River of Alberta under the Geological Survey of Canada, where they worked parallel to American paleontologist Barnum Brown of the American Museum of Natural History, before shipping all their collections to Ottawa, where their families also moved. Levi established a more permanent camp near Steveville, Alberta than the river barge the Sternbergs had been working from, which became the area known as Dinosaur Provincial Park. Charles H. and Levi Sternberg then left the Geological Survey in 1916, returning independently for two more seasons to the park, discovering specimens of Albertosaurus, Corythosaurus, and Panoplosaurus. Charles H. Sternberg then retired in 1918 and left Canada.

== Professional work and later life ==
After the retirement of his father, Levi Sternberg attained his greatest stature as a fossil collector. Sternberg and his wife Anne Lindblad established a home in Toronto, and was brought into the University of Toronto in late 1919 as head collector and preparator for the Royal Ontario Museum under Canadian paleontologist William Parks. In 1902, Sternberg brought his brother-in-law Gustav Lindblad to the museum, and led an expedition to Little Sandhill Creek along the Red Deer River where they successfully discovered the only specimen of Parasaurolophus. In 1925 he led an expedition to Pleistocene deposits in Saskatchewan, before continuing on to Steveville where he discovered specimens of Lambeosaurus, Struthiomimus and Chasmosaurus. From 1927 onwards, Sternberg and his staff also exchanged fossil discoveries with other North American institutions including the Los Angeles County Museum of Natural History. In 1935, he rediscovered a specimen of Styracosaurus that he had excavated in 1913 and 1914, reuniting the skeleton with the skull at the Canadian Museum of Nature. Sternberg continued to work for the Royal Ontario Museum until his retirement in 1962 with the position of associate curator. He had led 21 expeditions mostly in western Canada and the US, considered a meticulous collector. He died in Toronto on October 21, 1976, a few months after his wife. They had no children.
