= Dinosaur mummy =

Dinosaur fossil with skin preserved

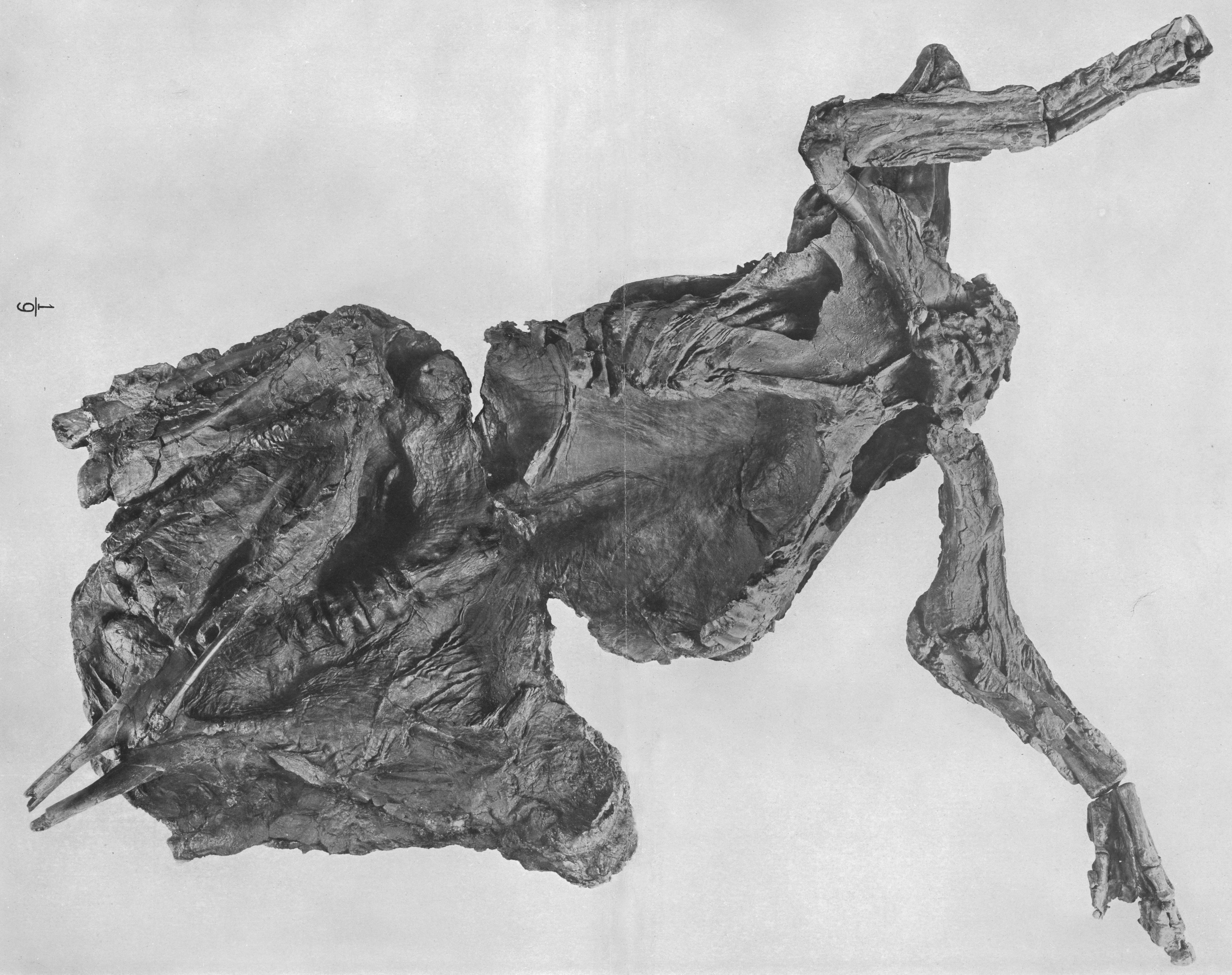
The Edmontosaurus mummy AMNH 5060 at the American Museum of Natural History, New York, in top view

Dinosaur mummies are exceptionally well-preserved dinosaur fossils with skin traces covering substantial parts of the body. The term was coined by Henry Fairfield Osborn in 1911 for an Edmontosaurus specimen (AMNH 5060) discovered in 1908 by fossil hunter Charles Hazelius Sternberg and his three sons in Wyoming, US.

== Definition and significance ==
The term dinosaur mummy was coined by Henry Fairfield Osborn in 1911, but originally referred to a single specimen, the Edmontosaurus mummy AMNH 5060 in the American Museum of Natural History (AMNH). The term has since been applied to several similar specimens, but only informally. All dinosaur fossils that have been regularly called "mummies" were found in North America and belong to the Hadrosauridae ("duck-billed dinosaurs"), and are therefore also known as "hadrosaur mummies". Occasionally, the name "mummy" has also been used for other exceptionally preserved dinosaur fossils. Phillip Manning, in a 2008 book, cited the paleontologist Kraig Derstler stating that the term "dinosaur mummy" may be applied to cases where "dinosaur skin impressions are extensive enough to wrap around a substantial amount of the articulated skeleton". In 2025, Sereno and colleagues formally defined the term fossil mummy to include any mostly intact fossil specimen that preserves extensive areas of integument such as skin or feathers and often shows signs of desiccation before burial.

Dinosaur mummies had a significant impact on the scientific and popular perception of hadrosaurids, and dinosaurs in general. Skin impressions found in between the fingers of the AMNH mummy have originally been interpreted as interdigital webbing, bolstering the now-rejected perception of hadrosaurids as aquatic animals, a hypothesis that remained unchallenged until 1964. Gregory S. Paul, in 1987, stated that the life appearance of Edmontosaurus and Corythosaurus can be more accurately restored than that of any other dinosaur thanks to the well-preserved mummy specimens.

== Specimens described as "dinosaur mummies" ==
The AMNH mummy was discovered in 1908 by fossil hunter Charles Hazelius Sternberg and his three sons in Wyoming, US. The second such mummy, now in the Naturmuseum Senckenberg in Frankfurt am Main, Germany, was discovered by the Sternbergs in 1910, just two years after the discovery of the AMNH mummy. Another mummy specimen was discovered by Barnum Brown 1912 in Alberta, Canada, and subsequently described as the new genus Corythosaurus. Yet another mummy was discovered by Sternberg, which he sent to the British Museum during World War I. But the ship it was sent on, the Mount Temple, was sunk by a German raider ship in 1916, resulting in the loss of the mummy as well as many other fossils discovered by Sternberg. After these initial finds, no more mummy specimens were discovered until the turn of the millennia. In 2000, a Brachylophosaurus mummy nicknamed "Leonardo" was discovered in the Judith River Formation of Montana. Another Edmontosaurus mummy, nicknamed "Dakota", was excavated from the Hell Creek Formation of North Dakota in 2006. In 2025, Paul Sereno and colleagues described two additional Edmontosaurus mummies that had been discovered in 1998 and 2002, respectively, in the same area in which the Sternbergs found their first two mummies.

Other dinosaur specimens that have been referred to as "mummies" include the ankylosaur Borealopelta, the Fighting Dinosaurs specimen, the Triceratops specimen "Lane", and the Tyrannosaurus specimen "Rex Jr.".

== Soft tissue preservation and stomach contents ==
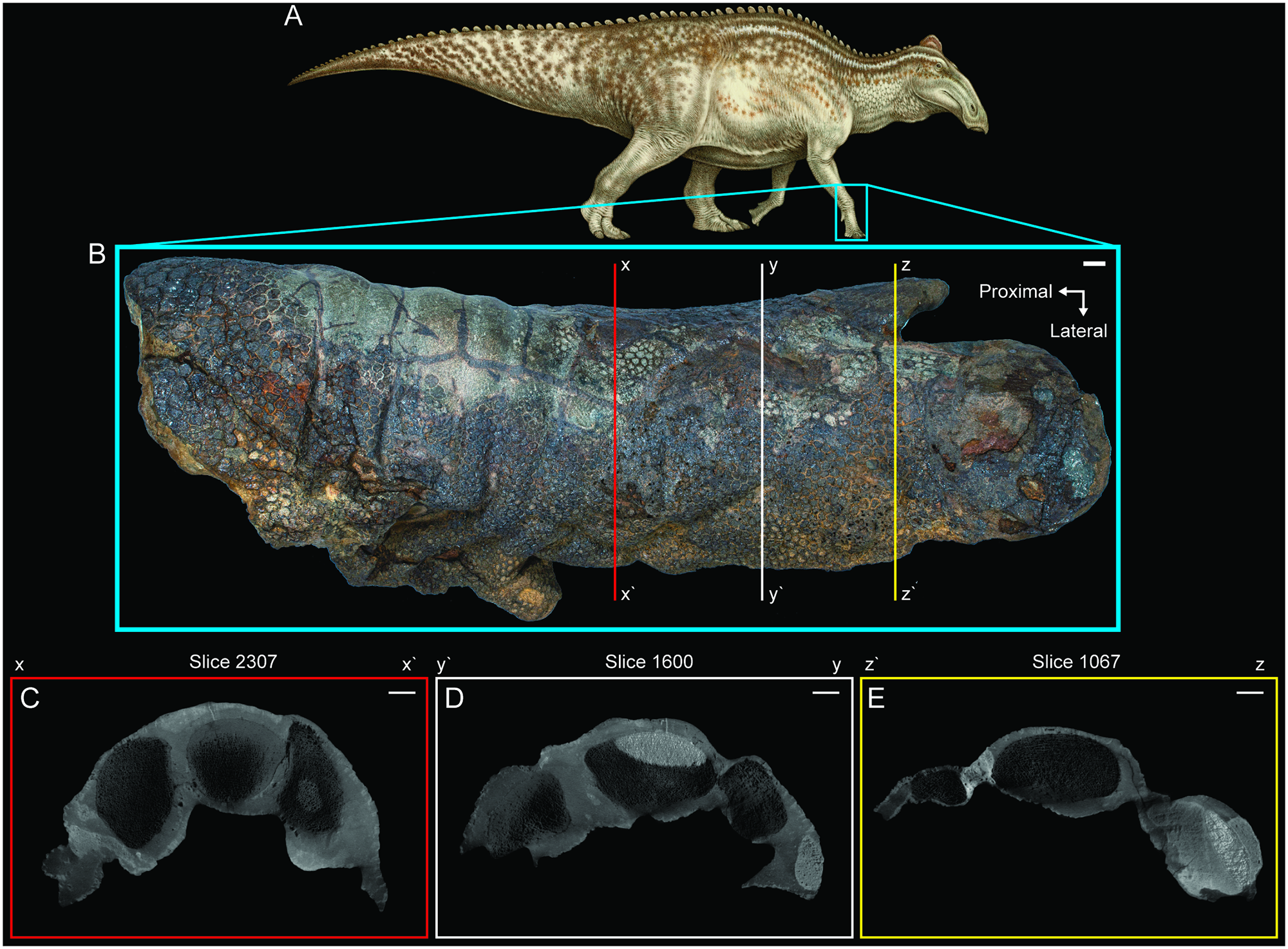
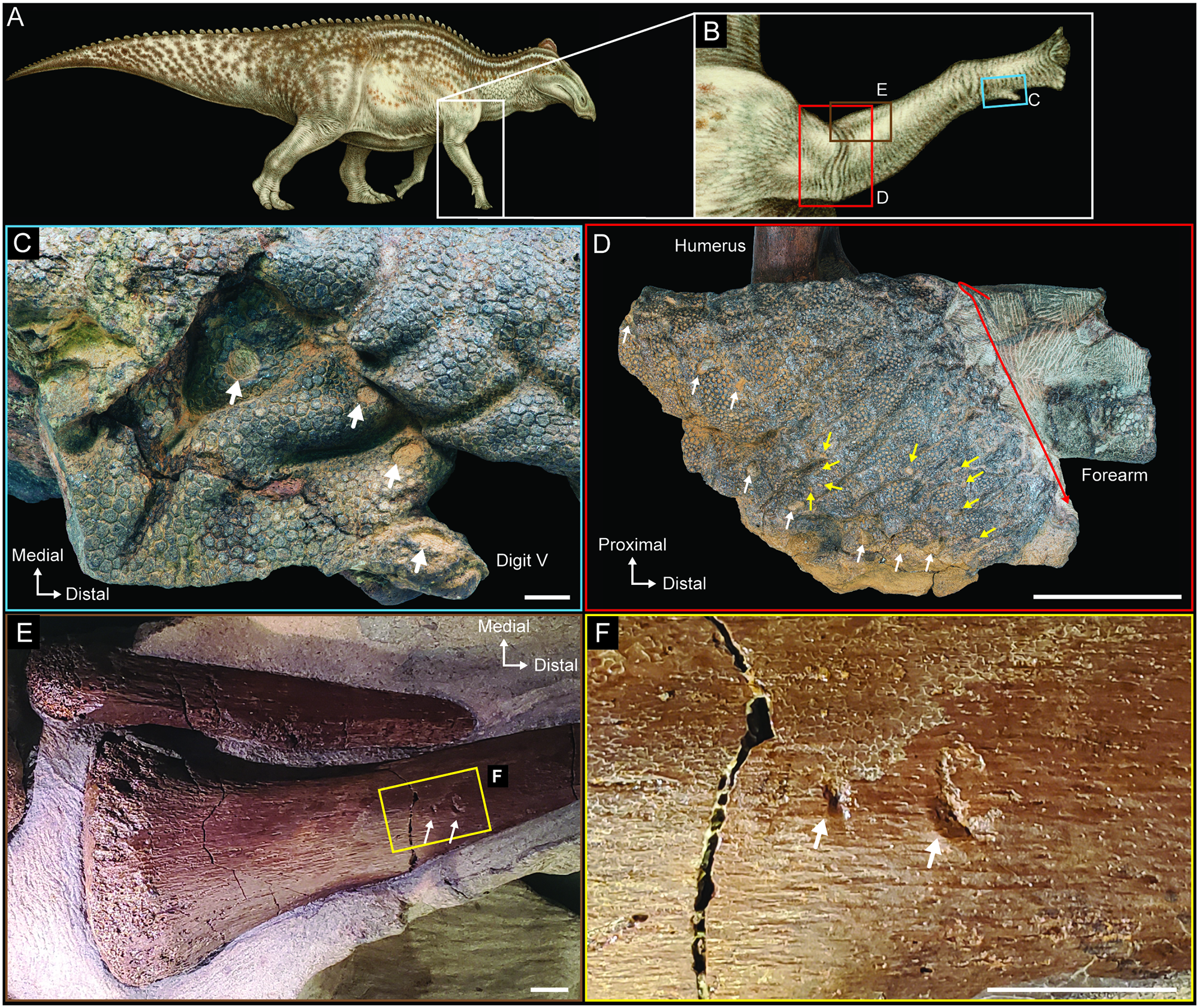
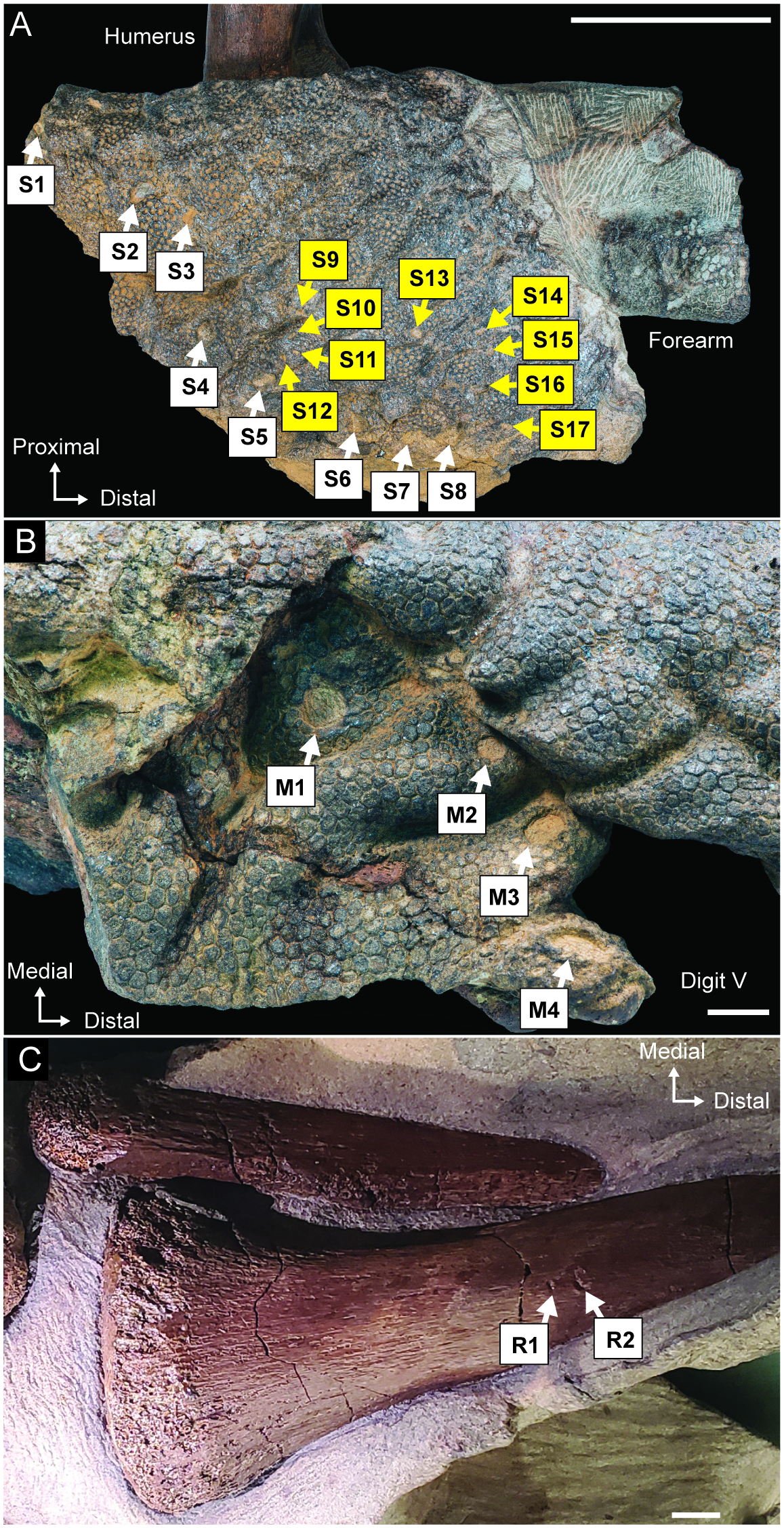
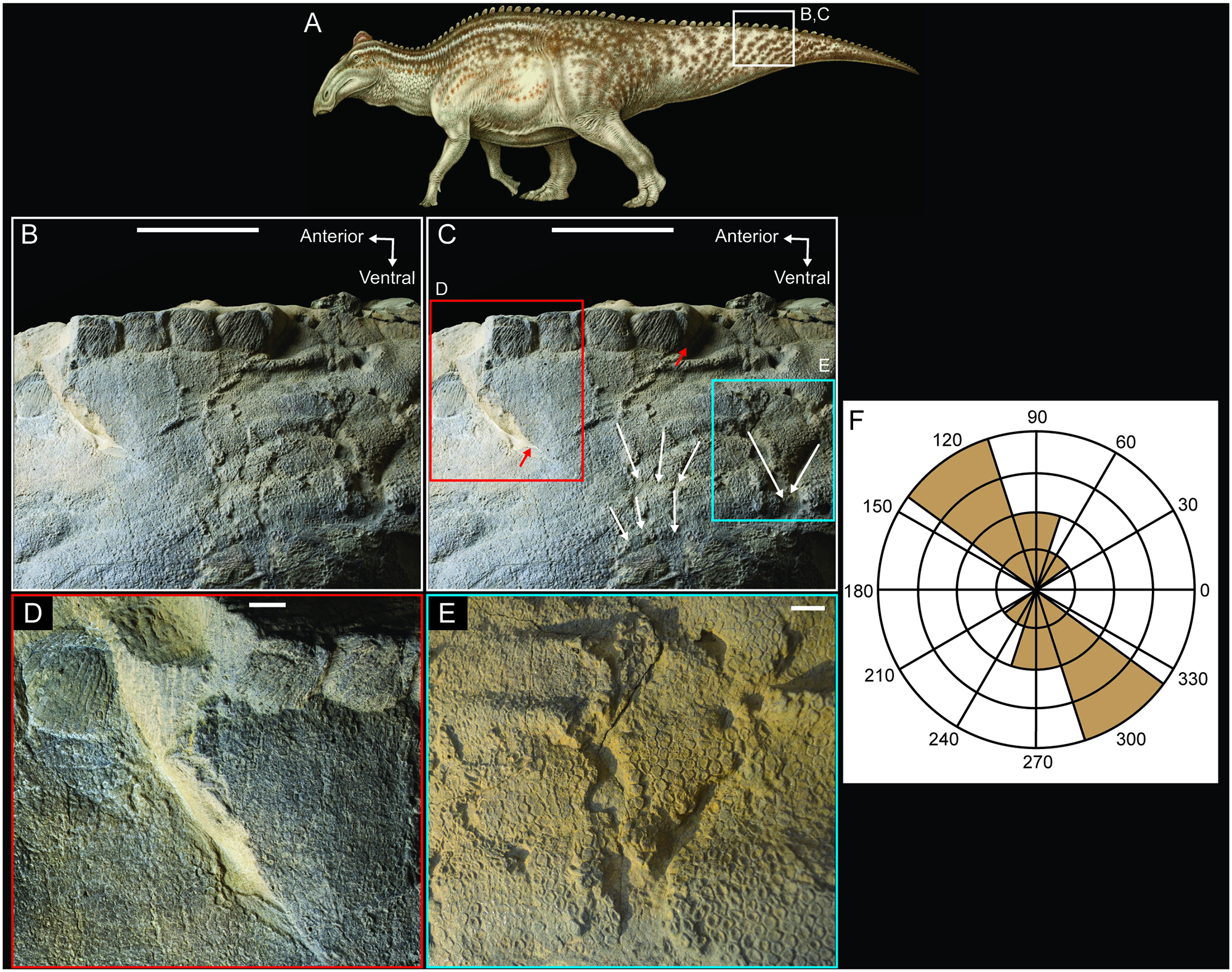
Detailed and labelled photographs of the preserved soft tissue of the mummy Dakota

Dinosaur mummies preserve extensive skin around the skeleton. The nature and composition of such skin has been debated. Traditionally, these structures are termed "skin impressions", even though they are preserved in positive relief (protruding up from the surface) rather than in negative relief as expected for an impression. In 2009 and 2015, Phillip Manning and colleagues reported the presence of organics deriving from the original skin tissue in the Edmontosaurus mummy "Dakota", including amide groups and melanin pigments. These authors also argued that the skin of dinosaur mummies is not preserved as an impression, but as a layer of several millimeters in thickness. Sereno and colleagues, in their 2025 study on Edmontosaurus mummies from the Lance Formation, proposed that the skin preserved due to a biofilm (layer of microorganisms) coating the entire integument (including skin, beaks, hooves and other external body parts) after the carcass was buried. This biofilm would have attracted clay minerals from the surrounding sediment due to electrostatic attraction, forming a thin clay layer less than 1 mm (0.039 in) in thickness. This clay layer accurately retained the shape of the skin in positive relief after the decay of the latter. Therefore, Sereno and colleagues argued that the skin should be termed "skin renderings", and, more specifically, "templates" (or "masks"). These authors found no evidence of organics in the skin renderings.

Other soft tissue structures that may be preserved in dinosaur mummies include renderings of the horny hooves and beaks. The "Dakota" specimen preserves skin injuries inflicted by scavengers (possibly crocodyliforms or theropods), the first such record documented in dinosaurs. Mummified specimens demonstrate that in Edmontosaurus, a skin frill ran along the neck and back, and an interdigitating row of spikes along the tail. One specimen, assignable to Edmontosaurus or a closely related genus, shows a soft-tissue comb on its head. The AMNH mummy shows cartilaginous structures of the nose.

Supposed stomach contents from the body cavity of the Senckenberg mummy have been used as evidence for a diet of terrestrial plants, but these remains were probably washed into the cadaver. In 2007, Nate Murphy and colleagues described plant material from the body cavity of the Brachylophosaurus mummy "Leonardo". This material was found within an apparently intact stomach cavity, suggesting that it was not washed in and therefore indeed represented the stomach contents of the individual.

== Taphonomy ==
Osborn noted that the skin of the first Edmontosaurus mummy was tightly wrapped around the specimen and partially drawn into the body interior. This indicates that the carcass had dried out and deflated before burial; the specimen is therefore the fossil of a natural mummy. Such desiccation has later been proposed for several other mummies. Stephanie Drumheller, in 2022, argued that the internal organs and muscles decayed or were scavenged, facilitating the desiccation of the carcasses. After desiccation on the surface, it is commonly assumed that the mummies were transported for a short distance by a flood, and then rapidly buried. Sand would have filled the body cavity, preventing the fossils from being flattened during fossilization.

In 2025, Sereno and colleagues noted that a small area of only 10 km (6.2 mi) in diameter in the Lance Formation yielded six dinosaur mummies, an exceptional density. This area, dubbed the "mummy zone", yielded four Edmontosaurus, one Triceratops, and one Tyrannosaurus mummy. Sereno and colleagues argued that the "mummy zone" was an area of rapid subsidence (downward movement of the Earth's surface) that resulted in high sedimentation rates, and was subjected to pronounced cycles of droughts and subsequent floods. The combination of these factors would have resulted in the exceptional abundance of mummies. These authors also argued that Edmontosaurus mummies are comparatively common because this genus preferred habitats closer to the coast where sedimentation rates were higher, while Triceratops tends to occur father inland.
