= George F. Sternberg =

American paleontologist (1883–1969)

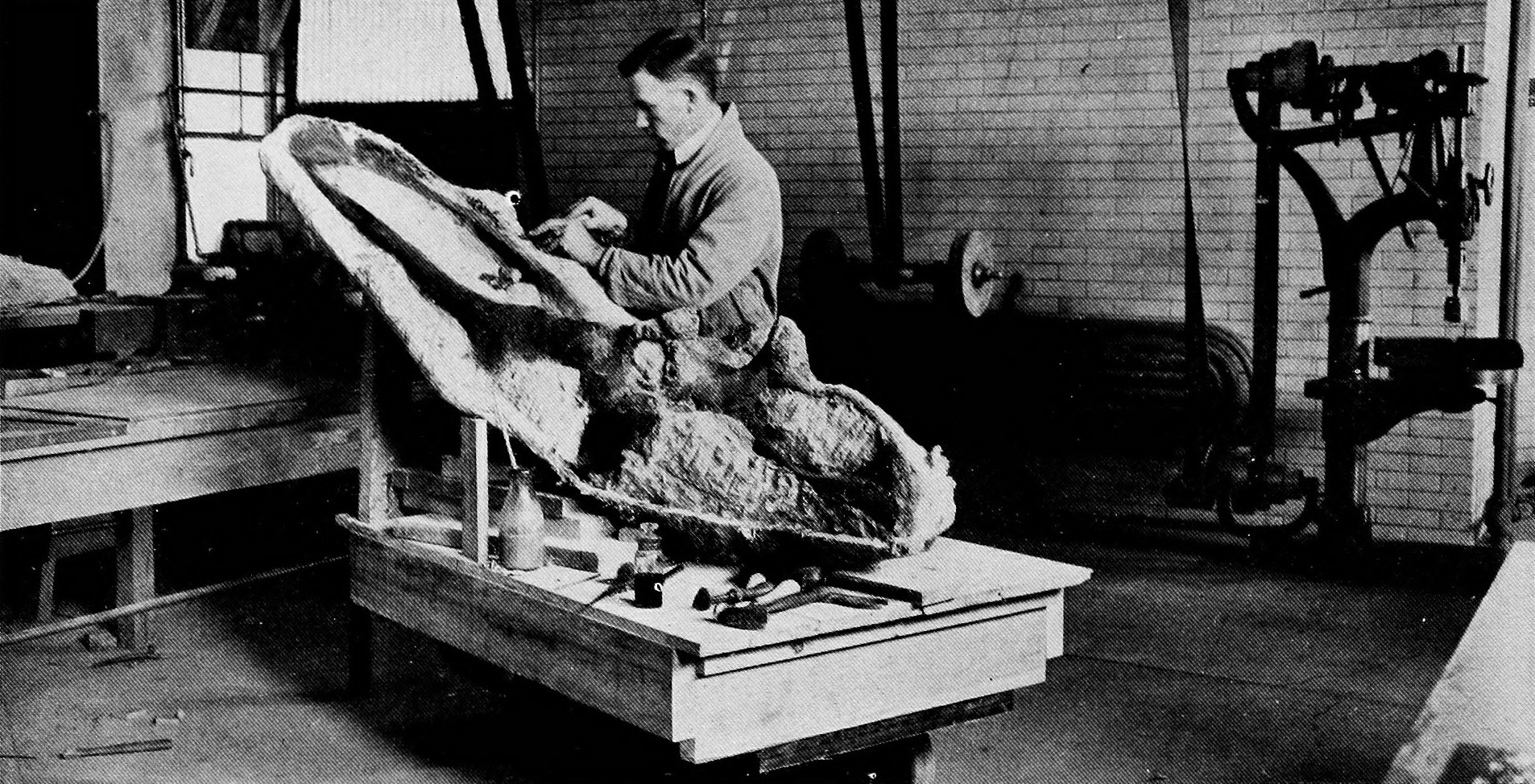
- Sternberg preparing the skull of Chasmosaurus belli, National Museum of Canada, 1914
- Born: 1883; Lawrence, Kansas, United States
- Died: October 23, 1969 (aged 85–86)
- Occupation: Fort Hays State University
- Known for: Paleontological collecting and studies
- Parent: Charles Sternberg

George Fryer Sternberg (1883 – October 23, 1969) was an American paleontologist best known for his discovery in Gove County, Kansas of the "fish-within-a-fish" of Xiphactinus audax with a recently eaten Gillicus arcuatus within its stomach. Sternberg was born in Lawrence, Kansas, and began leading fossil-hunting expeditions in the early 1900s. He became field paleontologist and curator of the museum of natural history at Fort Hays State University in Hays, Kansas in 1927.

George F. Sternberg was the son of Charles Hazelius Sternberg and nephew of Brigadier General George M. Sternberg. The Sternberg Museum of Natural History at Fort Hays State University in Hays, Kansas is named for his work and contributions to paleontology. The surname also honors the Sternberg fossil-hunting family, including his father, Charles Hazelius Sternberg (1850–1943), and his brother Charles Mortram Sternberg (1885–1981).

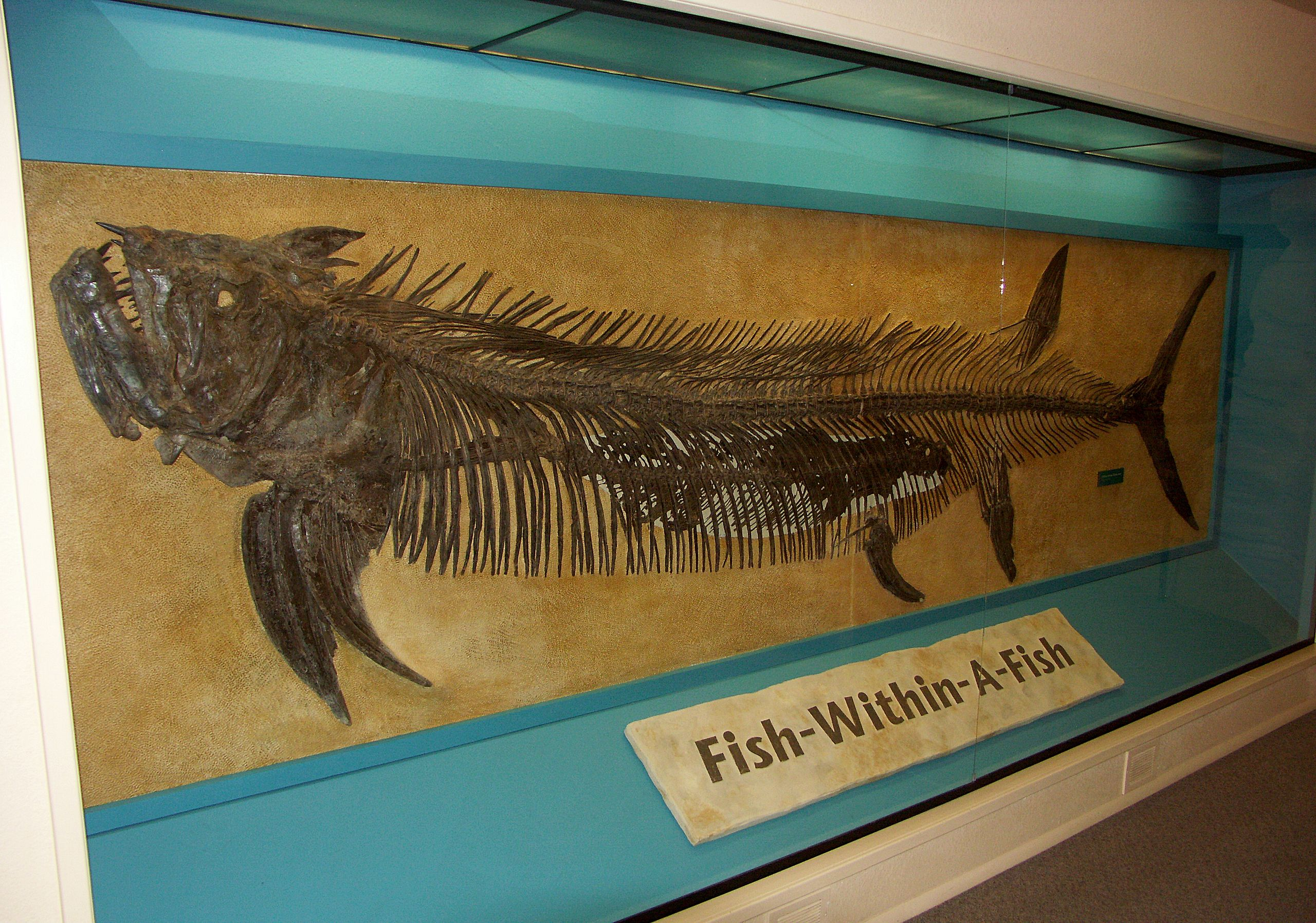
Gillicus arcuatus within the stomach of Xiphactinus audax, George F. Sternberg's most famous fossil find.

Sternberg formed a mentor relationship with Marion Charles Bonner of Leoti, Kansas, and through this relationship acquired many fossils from the Niobrara Cretaceous chalk for the museum's displays and archives. The most notable specimen Bonner donated and Sternberg prepared for display was a nearly complete Dolichorhynchops osbornii in 1956.

Sternberg retired from the museum in 1961. He died on October 23, 1969.
