= Charles Mortram Sternberg =

American paleontologist

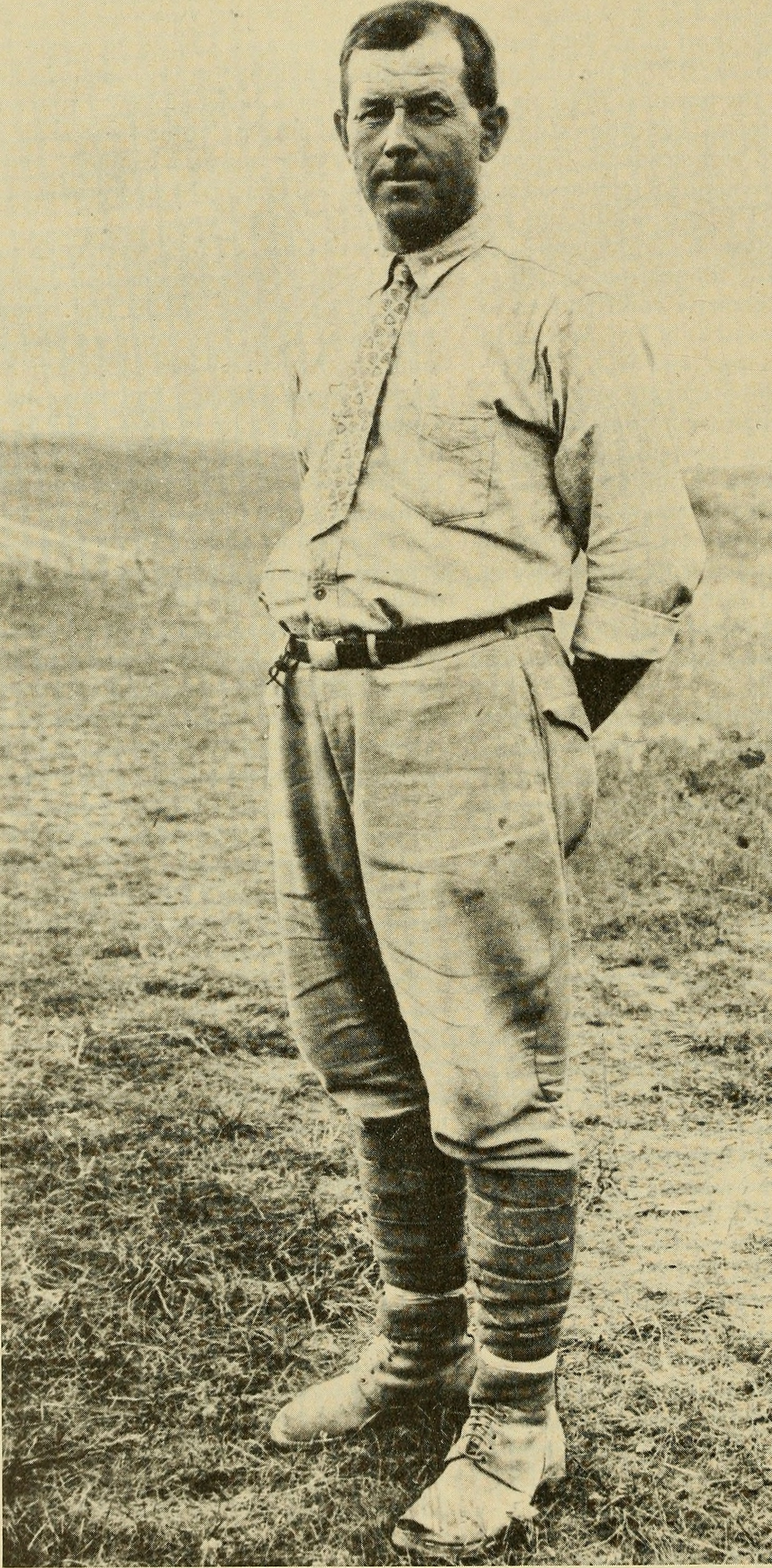
- Sternberg in 1928
- Born: September 18, 1885; Lawrence, Kansas, United States
- Died: September 8, 1981 (aged 95); Ottawa, Ontario, Canada
- Known for: Paleontology
- Children: 2
- Parent: Charles Sternberg

Charles Mortram Sternberg (September 18, 1885 – September 8, 1981) was an American-Canadian fossil collector and paleontologist, son of Charles Hazelius Sternberg. Late in his career, he collected and described Pachyrhinosaurus, Brachylophosaurus, Parksosaurus and Edmontonia. A contemporary author wrote, "No published study of Canadian dinosaurs is possible today without citing one or another of Sternberg's papers."

== Early life ==
Charles Mortram Sternberg was born in Lawrence, Kansas, from a family of famous American fossil collectors. Sternberg's highest level of education was a Kansas high school degree.

== Career ==
Sternberg moved with his father and two brothers, Levi and George, to Ottawa, Ontario, Canada in 1912. The four began working in Alberta collecting dinosaurs on behalf of the Geological Survey of Canada. This work was in competition with the American Museum of Natural History (New York) who were collecting many fossil skeletons and shipping them out of Canada.

Following Lawrence Lambe's death in 1919, Sternberg assumed the role of director of paleontology enterprise of the Geological Survey of Canada. Sternberg's first paper appeared in 1921, supplementing Lambe's study of the Ankylosaur Panoplosaurus. Sternberg later took over the scientific description of fossil vertebrates for the Geological Survey. He published 47 papers on fossil vertebrates, mostly dinosaurs, many based on his own remarkable discoveries. In 1936, Sternberg and his son Ray Martin installed permanent metal quarry markers in 112 dinosaur quarries within Dinosaur Provincial Park. The critical site locality data for these specimens was thereby saved, thus ensuring that information was useful for the dinosaur biostratigraphic work that is so important today. In 1948, he was promoted to the rank of Assistant Biologist in the National Museum of Canada, which is the equivalent of curator. In 1949, he was elected a Fellow of Royal Society of Canada. Although he retired in 1950, his publications continued until 1970. Sternberg later helped to establish Dinosaur Provincial Park in Alberta. He was granted honorary degrees by the University of Calgary and Carleton University in Ottawa.

He was a Freemason and member of Civil Service Lodge No. 148 in Ottawa.
