= Rudolf Richter (geologist) =

Rudolf Richter (7 November 1881 – 5 January 1957) was a German paleontologist and geologist. He became the director of the Senckenberg Museum and a professor at Goethe University Frankfurt. Richter was involved in research in sedimentology, micropaleontology and taxonomy. He was a follower of actualistic paleontology, following Charles Lyell's idea that the "present is a key to the past".

== Life and work ==
Richter was born in Glatz where his father was a physician. He went to the Ludwig-Maximilians-Universität München, initially studying law and then changed to geology after joining an excursion to the Eifel area. He completed his studies at Marburg University, working under Emanuel Kayser on trilobites. His doctoral thesis in 1910 was on Devonian trilobites from the Rheinische Schiefergebirge. He then worked at the Liebig Gymnasium in Frankfurt, conducting research in his spare time. He became a member of the Senckenberg naturalists society in 1908. In 1920, he became an assistant professor of geology and paleontology at Goethe University Frankfurt, becoming a full professor in 1934. In 1919, he was involved in founding the journal Senckenbergiana, editing it until his death. He later started a popular science magazine called Natur und Museum which was changed to Natur und Volk in 1931. In 1933, he became the director of the Senckenberg naturalist society. In 1929, he was involved in establishing a marine research station of the Senckenberg society. Richter's idea was to found a discipline called actualistic paletontology (Aktuopaläontologie) based on the ideas of Charles Lyell. It became a major research institution where marine sediments and biology were studied by Walther Häntzschel, Wilhelm Schäfer, and Hans-Erich Reineck. The institute is now named after Richter. The institution inspired the founding of the Sapelo Island Marine Institute in Georgia. In 1930, Richter was involved in establishing taxonomic codes for paleontology and was a part of the International Commission for Zoological Nomenclature.

Richter married Emma Hüther in 1913, and she collaborated with and illustrated many of his works on trilobites. Emma worked at the Senckenberg museum when Richter served during World War II. Together their work examined how fossils and the sediments they were in were associated. They examined the tracks and trails of the animals in sediments and were thus pioneers of actuoichnology and actuopaleontology.

During World War II, Richter tried to demonstrate the institute's importance for petroleum and geology research. He was working in Romania at the end of the war when he was arrested by allied forces. He was released in 1946 and resumed work as a professor in 1947. He died in 1957, shortly after the death of his wife.
