= Emma Richter =

German paleontologist (1888–1956)

- Born: Emma Hüther; 4 March 1888; Steinheim, Germany
- Died: 15 November 1956 (aged 68)
- Spouse: Rudolf Richter
- Children: 1 daughter

Academic work
- Discipline: Paleontology

Emma Richter (née Hüther, 4 March 1888 – 15 November 1956) was a German paleontologist. She is best known for her work concerning Trilobites. She was an honorary member of the Paleontological Society of America and received an honorary doctorate from the University of Tübingen.

== Life and career ==
Richter was born in Steinheim on 4 May 1888. She was educated at the Elisabethenschule in Frankfurt am Main, and then trained as a teacher.

Richter volunteered since childhood at the Senckenberg Museum which was where she met her husband Rudolf Richter. The pair were based at the University of Frankfurt, and went on to publish more than 70 joint works over the next forty years. She held the position, de facto, of curator of the Geological Section at the Senckenberg Museum, but was an unpaid volunteer both there and at the university. She developed a new way to assess trilobites through paloecological-biofacial assessment while representing her husband at the museum during the First World War. Richter also worked on several projects with her husband including producing 500 halftone images of trilobites for their book Die Trilobiten des Oberdevons Beiträge zur Kenntnis devonischer Trilobiten and creating a comparative database with over 44,000 images. Richter also supervised doctoral students of her husband.

Richter was made an honorary member of the Paleontological Society of America in 1934 and received an honorary doctorate from the University of Tübingen in 1949.

Richter died on 15 November 1956, two months before her husband also died.

== Family ==
Richter married Rudolf Richter, a fellow paleontologist, in 1913, and they had one daughter.
