= Artoriellula bicolor =

Scientific classification
- Kingdom: Animalia
- Phylum: Arthropoda
- Subphylum: Chelicerata
- Class: Arachnida
- Order: Araneae
- Infraorder: Araneomorphae
- Family: Lycosidae
- Genus: Artoriellula
- Species: A. bicolor

Binomial name
- Artoriellula bicolor (Simon, 1898)

Synonyms
- Artoria bicolor Simon, 1898

Species of spider

Artoriellula bicolor is a species of spider in the family Lycosidae. It is endemic to South Africa.

== Distribution ==
Artoriellula bicolor is known from the Western Cape in South Africa, with the type locality given as "Cap der Guten Hoffnung" (Cape of Good Hope).

== Habitat ==
The species is a free-running ground dweller sampled from the Fynbos biome.

== Description ==
The species is known only from the female.

The cephalothorax is red-brown, almost bald, without pale bands, with a black eye field. The sternum is pale yellow and finely edged with sharp black. The chelicerae are rust yellow.

The abdomen dorsally is shiny rusty yellow and only partially hairy, while ventrally it is pale yellow. The coxae and other leg segments are pale yellow, not darker, but the anterior legs are black except for the pale tarsi.

== Conservation ==
Artoriellula bicolor is listed as Data Deficient for Taxonomic reasons by the South African National Biodiversity Institute. Additional sampling is needed to collect the male and determine the species' range.

== Taxonomy ==
The species was originally described by Eugène Simon in 1898 as Artoria bicolor. Roewer revised the species in 1960. The holotype is housed at the Muséum national d'histoire naturelle in Paris, France, with a paratype at the Senckenberg Museum in Frankfurt am Main, Germany.
