= Häntzschel =

Häntzschel or Haentzschel is a German surname. Notable people with the surname include:

- Georg Haentzschel (1907–1992), German pianist, broadcaster, composer, and arranger
- Walter Häntzschel (1904–1972), German paleontologist
