= Edmontosaurus mummy SMF R 4036 =

Dinosaur fossil

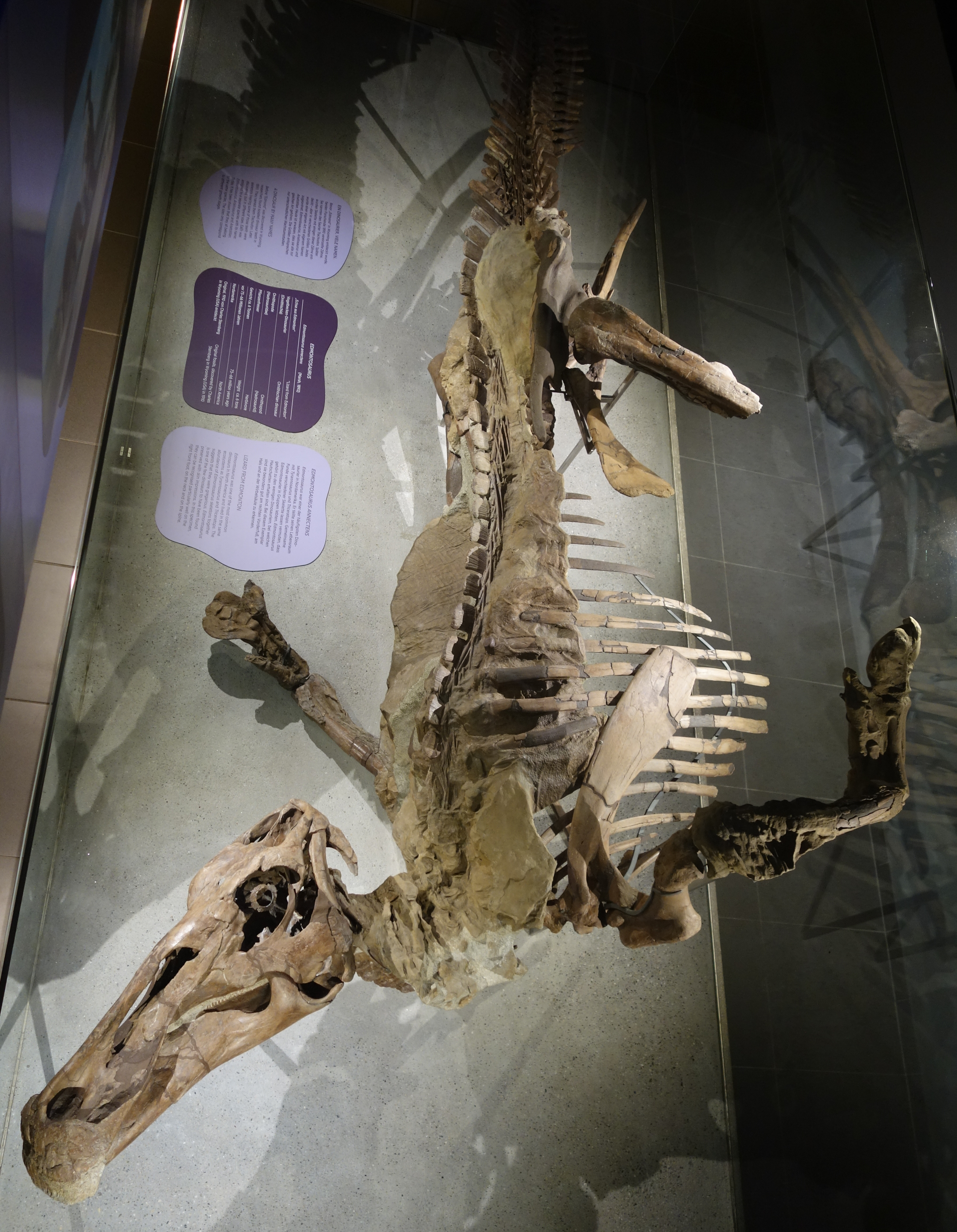
The mummy as exhibited in the Senckenberg Museum, showing the top and left side of the body

The Edmontosaurus mummy SMF R 4036, nicknamed the Senckenberg mummy or Edmond, is a well-preserved dinosaur fossil in the collection of the Senckenberg Museum (SMF) in Frankfurt am Main, Germany. It was found in 1910 in Wyoming, United States, in rocks of the Lance Formation that date to the late Maastrichtian, close to the Cretaceous–Paleogene extinction event around 66 million years ago. The mummy is ascribed to the species Edmontosaurus annectens (originally Trachodon), a member of the Hadrosauridae ("duck-billed dinosaurs"). It comprises a nearly complete skeleton that was found wrapped in skin impressions, (Note: Although commonly referred to as "skin impressions", Paul Sereno and colleagues argued in 2025 that the skin is not preserved as an impression but as a thin layer of clay coating a biofilm (bacterial layer) that formed around the body. This layer took the shape of the external surface of the skin, in positive relief (protruding up from the surface). The skin itself is not preserved.) a rare case of preservation for which the term dinosaur mummy has been used. (Note: The term mummy has, in the context of dinosaurs, mostly been used informally. However, Sereno and colleagues, in 2025, formally defined the term fossil mummy to include any mostly intact fossil specimen that preserves extensive areas of integument such as skin or feathers and often shows signs of desiccation before burial.) The fingers of the right hand are wrapped in a mitten-like envelope of skin impressions, initially interpreted as a paddle unsuited for terrestrial locomotion, thereby reinforcing the now outdated hypothesis that hadrosaurs were aquatic. The impression of a horny beak is also preserved with this specimen. Plant remains found in the body cavity were interpreted as stomach contents, suggesting a diet of terrestrial plants. It is now believed that this plant material was washed into the body cavity of the carcass.

It is assumed that the individual died during a drought, in or near a riverbed. Subsequently, the carcass would have dried out before being carried away by a sudden flood and been buried rapidly. Sand filled the body cavity, preserving the three-dimensional shape of the body, and a biofilm (bacterial mat) on the skin formed a thin crust of clay that preserved the shape of the skin in positive relief (protruding up from the surface). The mummy was found by fossil hunter Charles H. Sternberg and his sons, who sold their numerous finds to museums in North America and Europe. It is one of the best preserved hadrosaurid mummies and the second to be discovered, after the first such mummy was discovered by the Sternbergs in the same region two years earlier.

== Discovery and research history ==
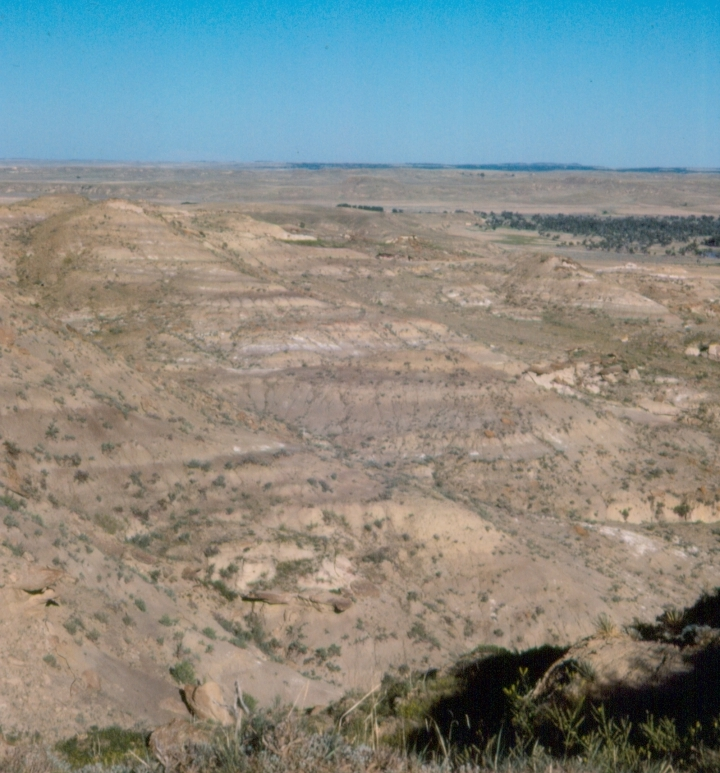
Badlands of the Lance Formation in Niobrara County, Wyoming, where the mummy was found

The mummy was discovered in early September 1910 by the Sternbergs, a family of commercial fossil hunters consisting of Charles H. Sternberg and his three sons George, Charles, and Levi in rocks of the Lance Formation in Converse County (today Niobrara County), Wyoming, United States. The family had worked in this area since 1908, when they discovered the similar Edmontosaurus mummy AMNH 5060, which was acquired by the American Museum of Natural History (AMNH) in New York City. In 1908 and 1909, they had also found two skulls of the horned dinosaur Triceratops, one of which was sold to the Natural History Museum, London, while the other was bought by the AMNH. In 1910, preceding the discovery of the mummy, the party had excavated an Edmontosaurus skeleton and four Triceratops skulls, two of which were acquired by the Senckenberg Museum.

The Senckenberg mummy comes from the southern Schneider Creek (today spelled Snyder Creek), on the Zerbst Ranch. Charles M. Sternberg, who had so far been unsuccessful in finding specimens that season, discovered a sacral (hip) vertebra and a hind limb weathering out of grey sandstone as he roamed the area in search of fossils with his brother Levi. The party moved its camp to the site on 4 September and was joined by the local Lon Galbreath. Their equipment consisted of four horses, a heavy lumber wagon, and a buggy. The recovery of the fossil was the most elaborate the family had ever undertaken. Charles H. Sternberg was determined to secure every fragment of the skin impressions, which is why the blocks packed for transport were particularly large: the block containing the mummy's trunk weighed over 1,400 kg (3,000 lb), while the entire fossil weighed about 4,500 kg (10,000 lb). Since the Sternbergs had no pulley, the block was lifted step by step, by elevating it using levers of poplar wood and subsequently shoveling sand underneath. When the block was lifted to a height of 1.2 m (3 ft 11 in), it could be loaded onto a wagon for transportation to the railway station 121 km (75 mi) away in Edgemont, South Dakota. The excavation and transport took two and a half months to complete.

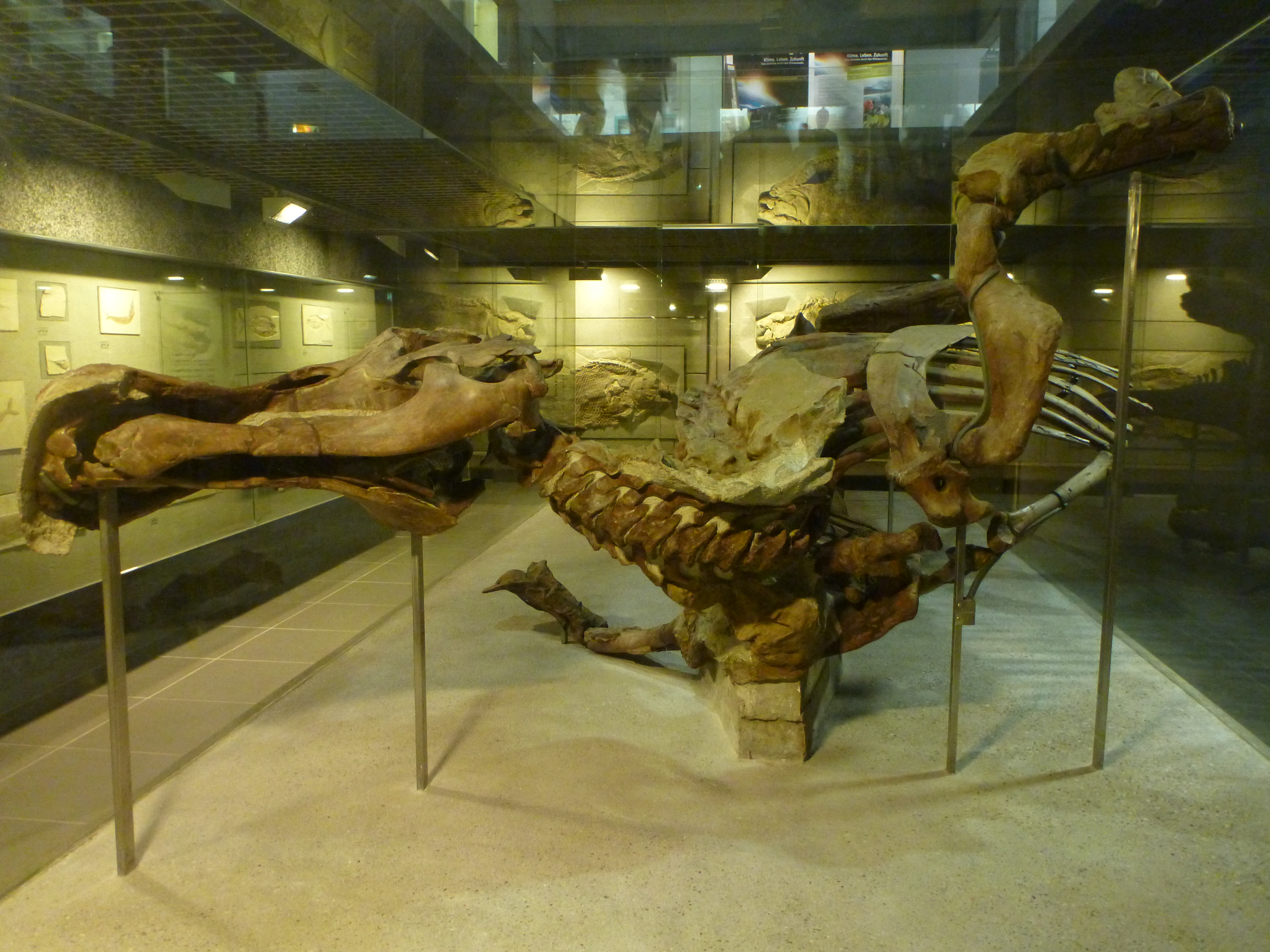
The mummy in front view

Charles H. Sternberg offered to sell the fossil to Fritz Drevermann, paleontologist and head of the paleontology department of the Senckenberg Museum (Naturmuseum Senckenberg, SMF) in Frankfurt, Germany. Drevermann was able to pay the required sum of US$2,500 (equivalent to $86,400 in 2025) through a donation from the industrialist Arthur Weinberg. Shortly after Drevermann's commitment, Sternberg received an offer from the Canadian Museum of Nature in Ottawa. The museum offered twice the amount of money for the fossil than Sternberg was to receive from the Senckenberg Museum. Sternberg wrote in 1917:

I shall never forget the effort I made to induce him [Drevermann] to give up the specimen, or take another in its stead. A day or two after I received his acceptance of my offer, I received an offer from Dr. Brock of the Victoria Memorial Museum [the Canadian Museum of Nature]. He wished me to mount the specimen in Ottawa, and offered me double the price I was to receive from Senckenberg for the unmounted specimen. But it crossed the Atlantic. The last message I had of it, before this awful war cut off all communications, was that the head had been prepared and it was the best of which there was any record.

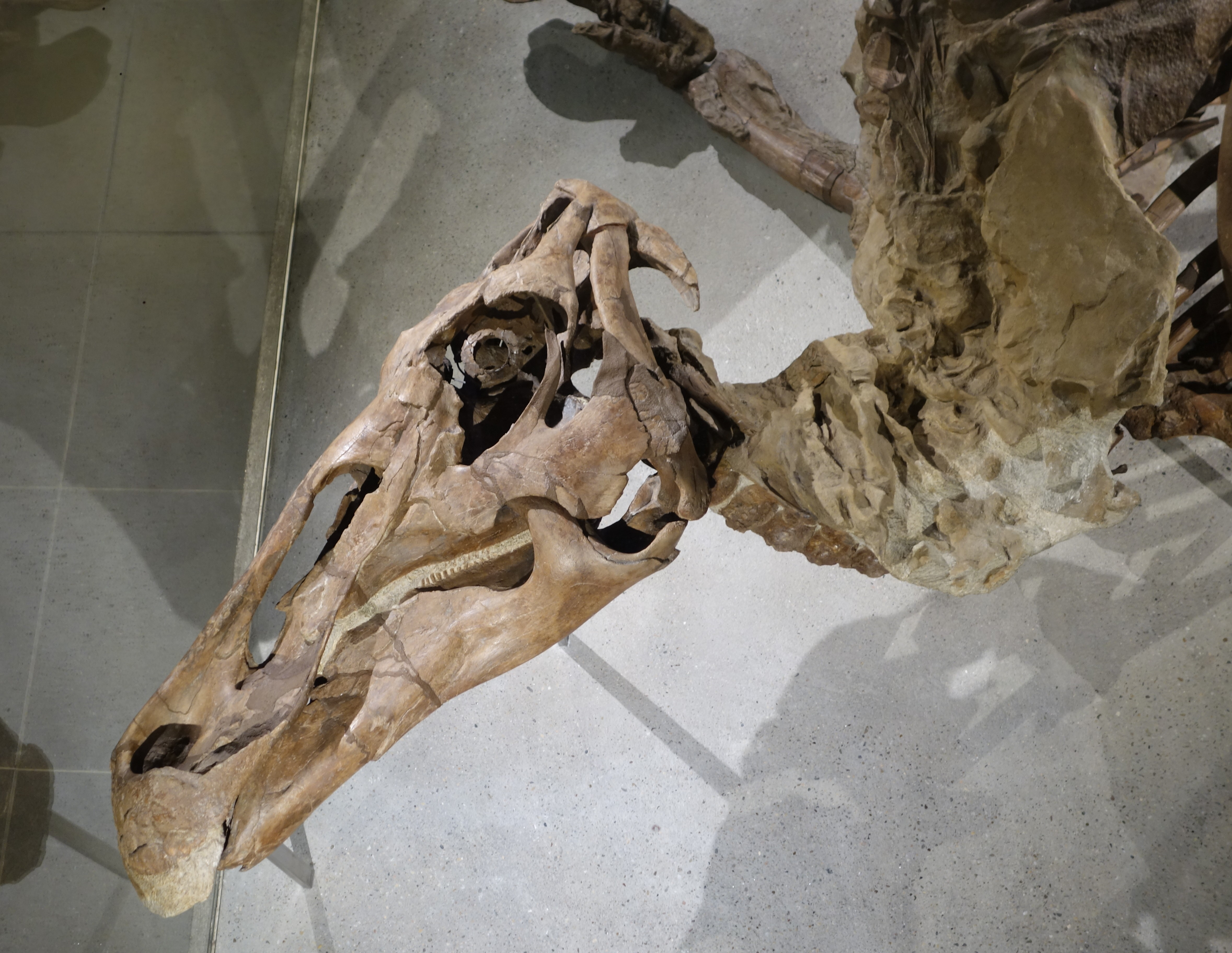
Skull of the Senckenberg mummy

The mummy arrived at the Senckenberg museum in 1911. At that time, the preparators were still occupied with one of the Triceratops skulls that the museum had received from Sternberg the previous year, so that the preparation of the mummy began only in 1912. Preparation was completed in 1920, probably being delayed by World War I. The mummy was among the first larger fossils to be prepared using compressed-air tools, a technique developed from 1914 onwards by Christian Strunz, the museum's preparator-in-chief. Several German-language publications on the mummy were published in the early 1920s, focusing on supposed stomach contents, the anatomy of the skull, and the movements of the jaws during chewing.

During World War II, a construction of sandbags was built around the mummy to prevent damage from bombing raids. When the bombings intensified, the mummy was moved to a safer location outside the city. On the way back to the museum after the war, however, the mummy fell off a truck and burst into multiple pieces; the subsequent restoration took more than 10 years. From 1963–1964, a new cellar was built to house the mummy, allowing it to be viewed from both the sides and from the room above. Since the initial 1920s studies, little research had been done on the specimen until the museum initiated the "Edmontosaurus project" in 2018. This project included the excavation of about 30 tonnes of a bonebed in the vicinity of the original excavation site of the mummy. The excavated blocks, containing hundreds of bones of Edmontosaurus and other animals, were shipped to Frankfurt and prepared as part of the museum's exhibition. Further research on the mummy itself was also initiated, leading to a re-evaluation of the supposed stomach contents and a paleoenvironmental reconstruction based on pollen from the body cavity. The mummy, dubbed "Edmond" by the museum, is one of the museum's most valuable fossils.

== Significance and classification ==
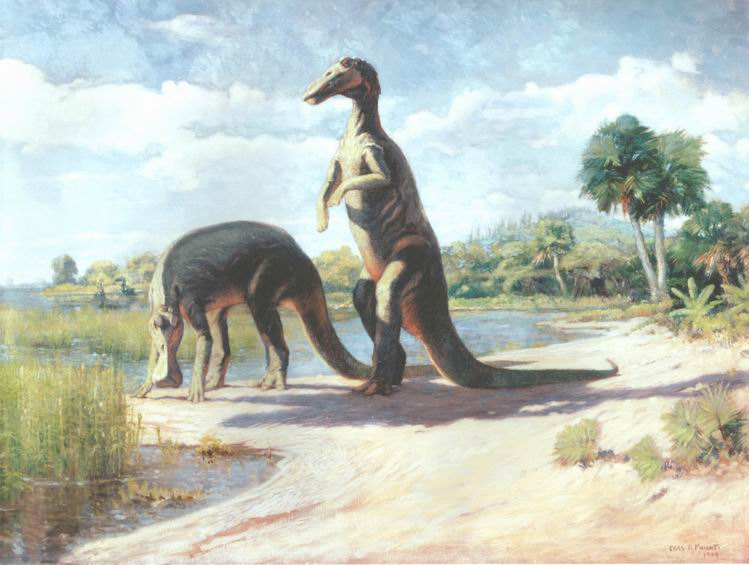
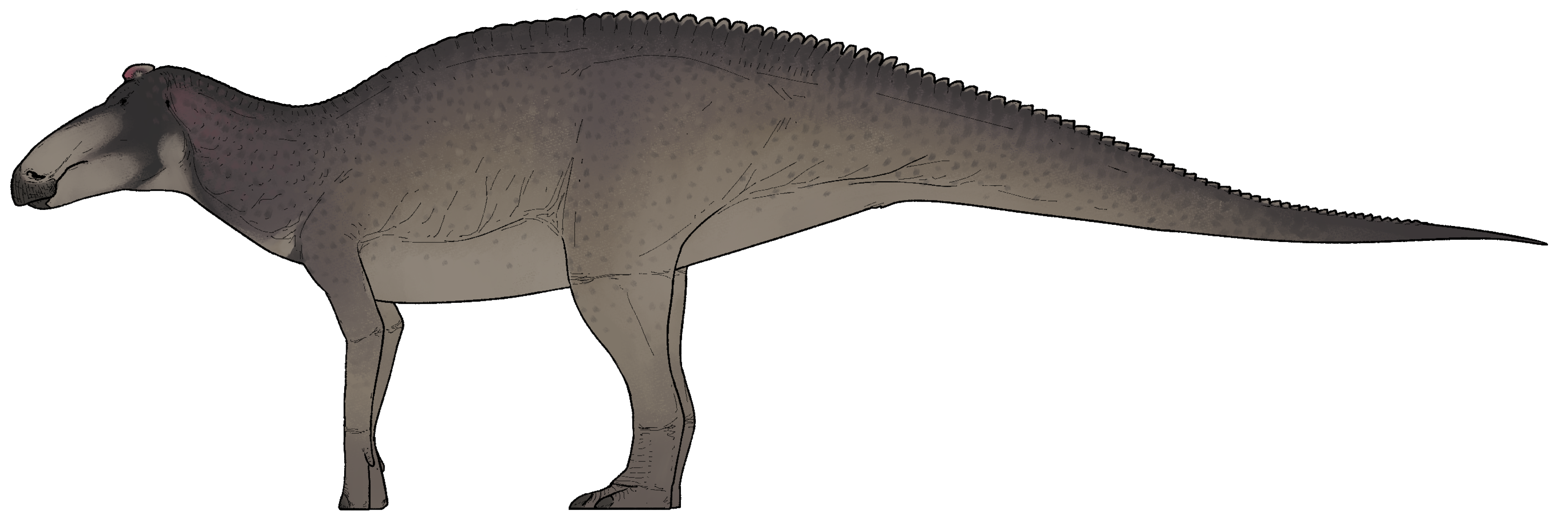
Top: Historical life restoration of Trachodon (Edmontosaurus) drawn by Charles R. Knight in 1909, reconstructed based on the AMNH mummy. Several aspects such as the dragging tail, the upright body posture, and the flat, duck-like bill are now considered to be inaccurate. Bottom: Modern hypothetical life restoration of Edmontosaurus annectens.

The Senckenberg specimen was the second dinosaur mummy to be discovered. The term dinosaur mummy was originally coined by Henry Fairfield Osborn in 1911 for the Edmontosaurus mummy of the AMNH. This term was later used to refer to a handful of similar hadrosaurid ("duck-billed dinosaurs") specimens with extensive skin impressions, all of which have been discovered in North America. A third mummy was discovered by Barnum Brown in 1912 in Alberta, Canada, and subsequently described as the new genus Corythosaurus. Yet another mummy was discovered by Sternberg in 1916, which he sent to London during World War I. The transport ship, the SS Mount Temple, was sunk by a German raider ship in December 1916, resulting in the loss of this mummy as well as many other fossils discovered by Sternberg. Additional mummies have been excavated since the turn of the millennium, such as a Brachylophosaurus mummy nicknamed "Leonardo" and an Edmontosaurus mummy nicknamed "Dakota".

The mummy belongs to the species Edmontosaurus annectens within Hadrosauridae, a family of ornithischian ('bird-hipped') dinosaurs. It was initially assigned to the genus Trachodon, which encompassed nearly all known hadrosaurid specimens at that time. Osborn initially assigned the specimen to the species Trachodon annectens. In a 1942 monograph on North American hadrosaurs, Richard Lull and Nelda E. Wright moved the species together with the mummy into the new genus Anatosaurus, as Anatosaurus annectens. In 1990, Michael K. Brett-Surman and Ralph Chapman proposed that the species actually belongs within the genus Edmontosaurus, which was followed by subsequent reviews. The majority of dinosaur skin impressions are referable to hadrosaurids. In North American specimens from the Maastrichtian age, skin impressions are 31 times more abundant in association with hadrosaurid specimens than with any other coeval group. The reasons for this distribution are unclear. Of all known hadrosaurid skin impressions, 25% belong to Edmontosaurus.

== Description ==
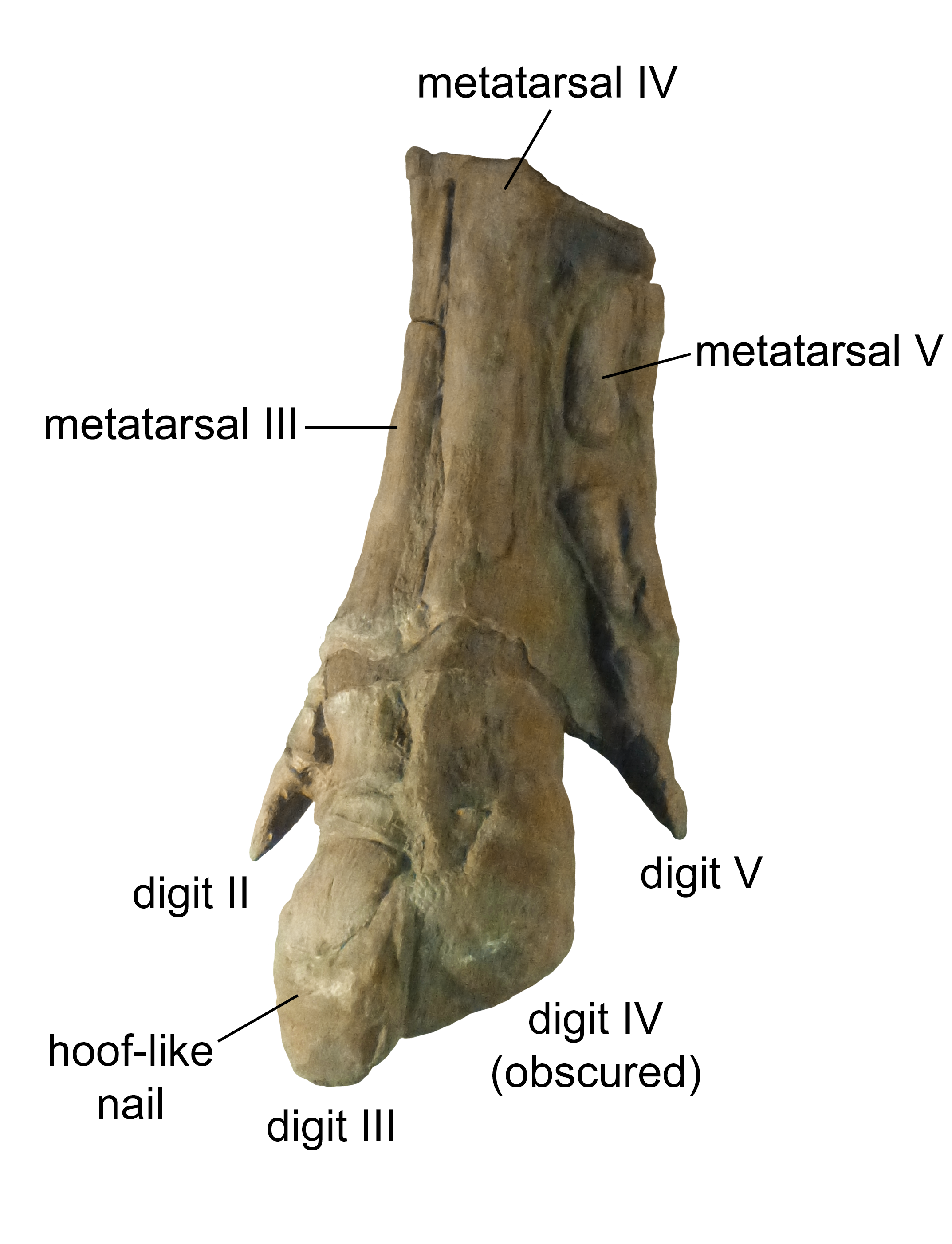
Labelled left hand of the mummy

The skeleton is mostly complete but lacks one of the two hind limbs and the end of the tail; it is more complete than the AMNH mummy. The skull is completely preserved, including the impression of the horny beak and the scleral ring around the pupil of the eye. Sternberg reported that the trunk and skull together were 3.7 m (12.2 ft) long, the tail was 1.7 m (5.6 ft) long, and the rib cage was 1.5 m (5 ft) wide. The skull is 105 cm (41 in) long. The individual was about 122% the size of the AMNH mummy, and was probably an old adult.

The bones of the mummy are fully articulated (still in their original anatomical position) and mostly preserved three-dimensionally, not flattened as with many other fossils. The forelimbs are oriented backwards and upwards, and the skull is elevated relative to the trunk. The preserved hind limb has its fibula (calf bone) and tibia (shin bone) folded against the femur (thigh bone), while the foot is pointing downwards. Preserved skin impressions come from the right side of the trunk and the neck as well as both forearms. Especially well-preserved skin is found around the right hand. The palm of this hand shows polygonal scales about 3–5 mm (0.12–0.20 in) in diameter, while those of the upper surface of the hand are twice this size. Most other skin impressions have been separated from the skeleton during preparation.

== Paleobiology ==
=== Supposed aquatic lifestyle and posture ===
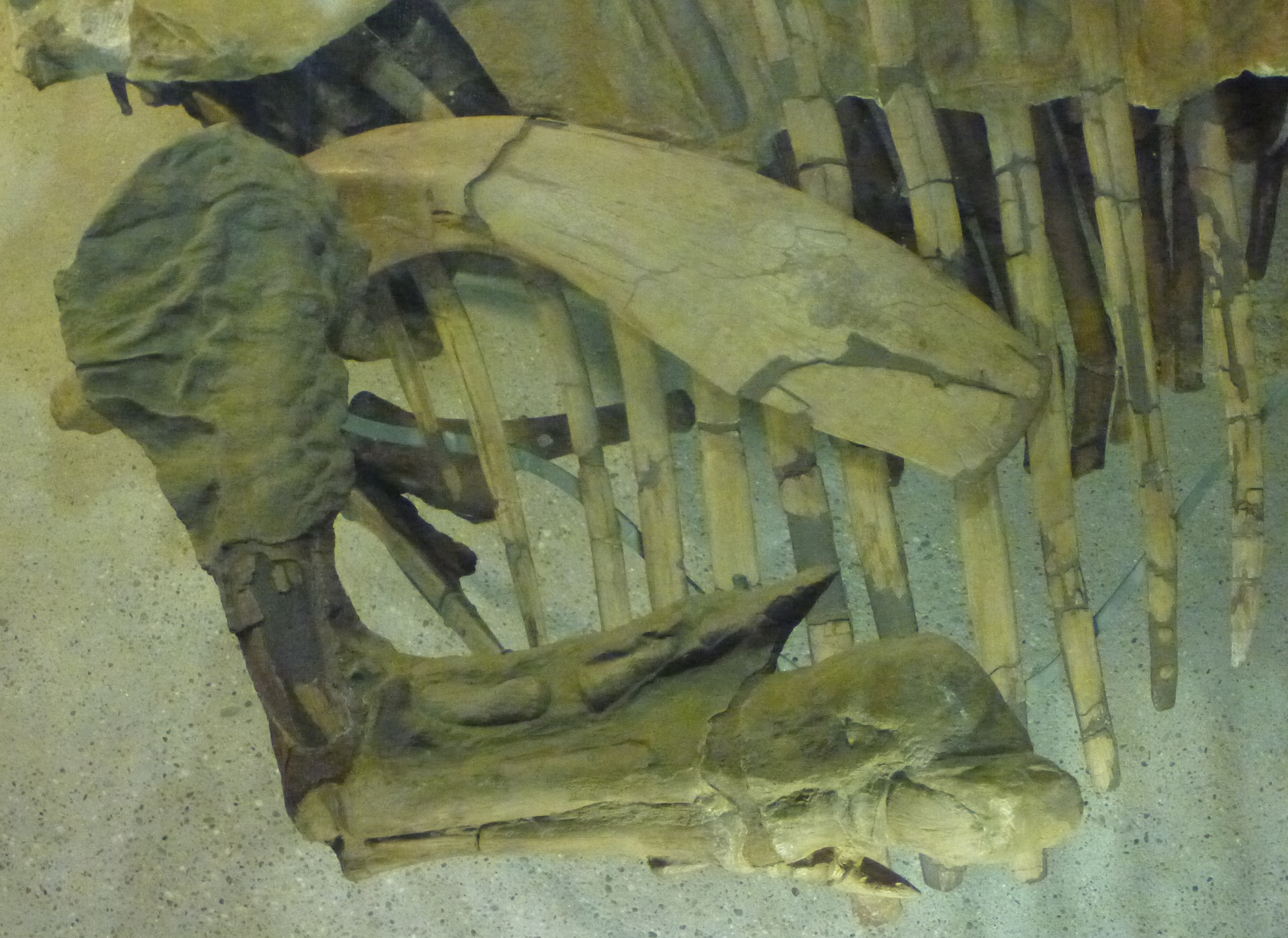
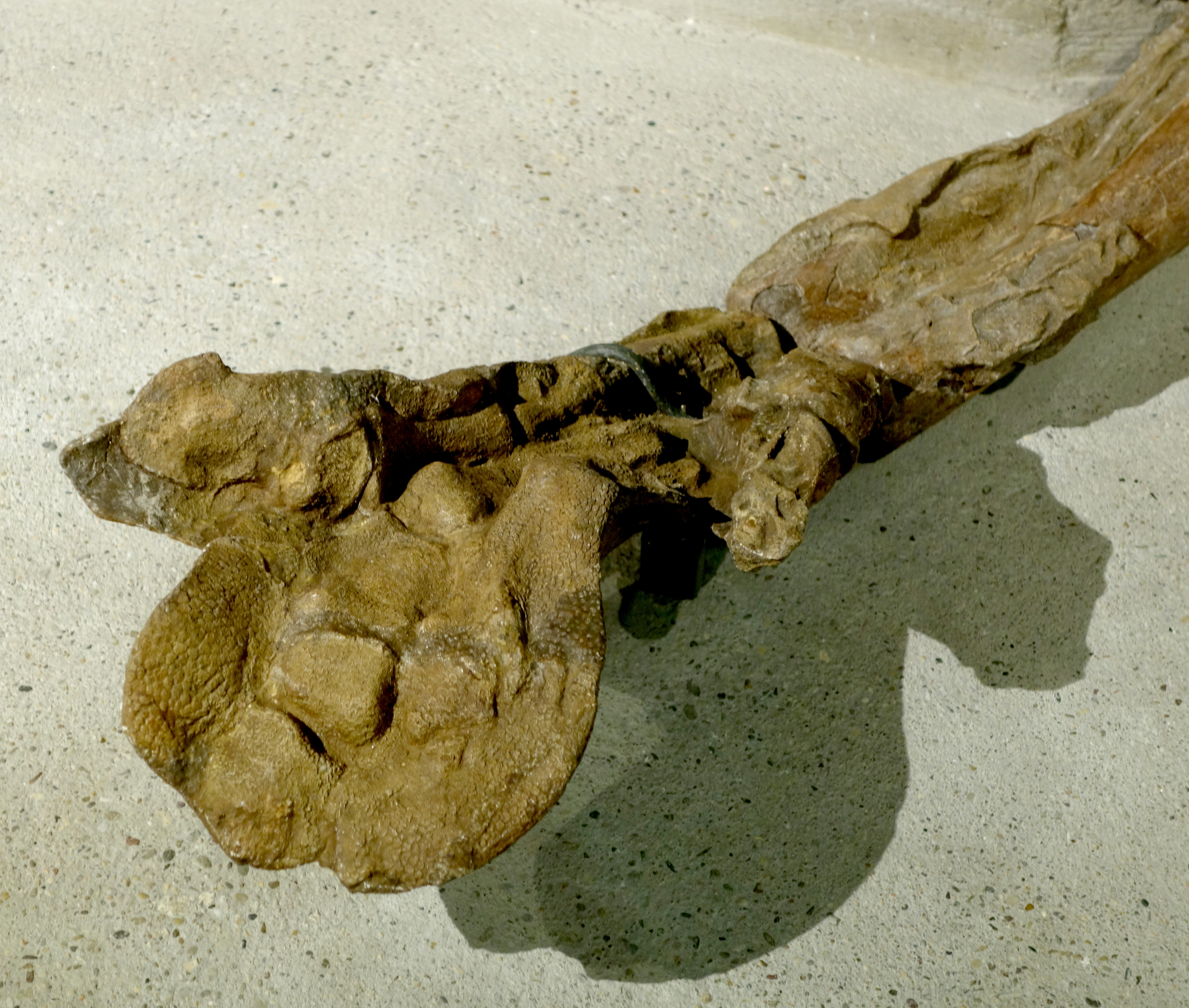
Top: Detail of the left forelimb. Bottom: Detail of the right hand, showing the mitten-like envelope of skin that encases the digits

The fingers of both the AMNH and Senckenberg mummies are completely enclosed in a mitten-like envelope of skin impressions. Osborn, in 1912, interpreted the impressions of the AMNH mummy as interdigital webbing and the forelimb as a long paddle, indicating an aquatic lifestyle for hadrosaurids. The idea of an aquatic lifestyle had been proposed before, but it was only after the discovery of the two mummies that this idea became the universally accepted doctrine. According to Lull and Wright, the paddle-like limb of the Senckenberg mummy confirmed that these animals were aquatic, and the lack of foot pads or hooves showed that the forelimbs were unsuited for walking. In his 1911 account on the discovery of the Senckenberg mummy, Charles Hazelius Sternberg speculated that trachodons "[...] lived in the water, and only came on the land at the peril of their lives, as they had no means of defense against the king of carnivorous reptiles, Tyrannosaurus [...]".

In 1964, John H. Ostrom argued that hadrosaurids must have fed on resistant terrestrial plants rather than on soft aquatic ones, and that the skeleton was adapted for a bipedal locomotion on land. The hypothesis of an aquatic lifestyle was finally abandoned after Robert Bakker, in 1986, argued that the skin between the fingers of the AMNH mummy was actually the remnant of a fleshy pad enveloping the hand that had dried out and flattened during mummification. Furthermore, Bakker argued that the fingers were short and could hardly have been spread apart, which distinguishes them fundamentally from the long, spread toes of today's paddling animals such as ducks.

In his 1911 account on the discovery of the mummy, Charles Hazelius Sternberg noted that the sprawling posture of the preserved hind limb is comparable to that of the AMNH mummy, and suggested that this could have reflected the original posture of the living animal—in contradiction with skeletal mounts of the time, which often showed more erect limbs. Sternberg noted: "He walked like a lizard, with body close to the ground and tail dragging out behind." In 1968, Bakker showed that dinosaurs had erect limbs, and in 1970, Peter Galton showed that hadrosaurids had horizontal trunks and tails that were held clear off the ground.

=== Supposed stomach contents ===
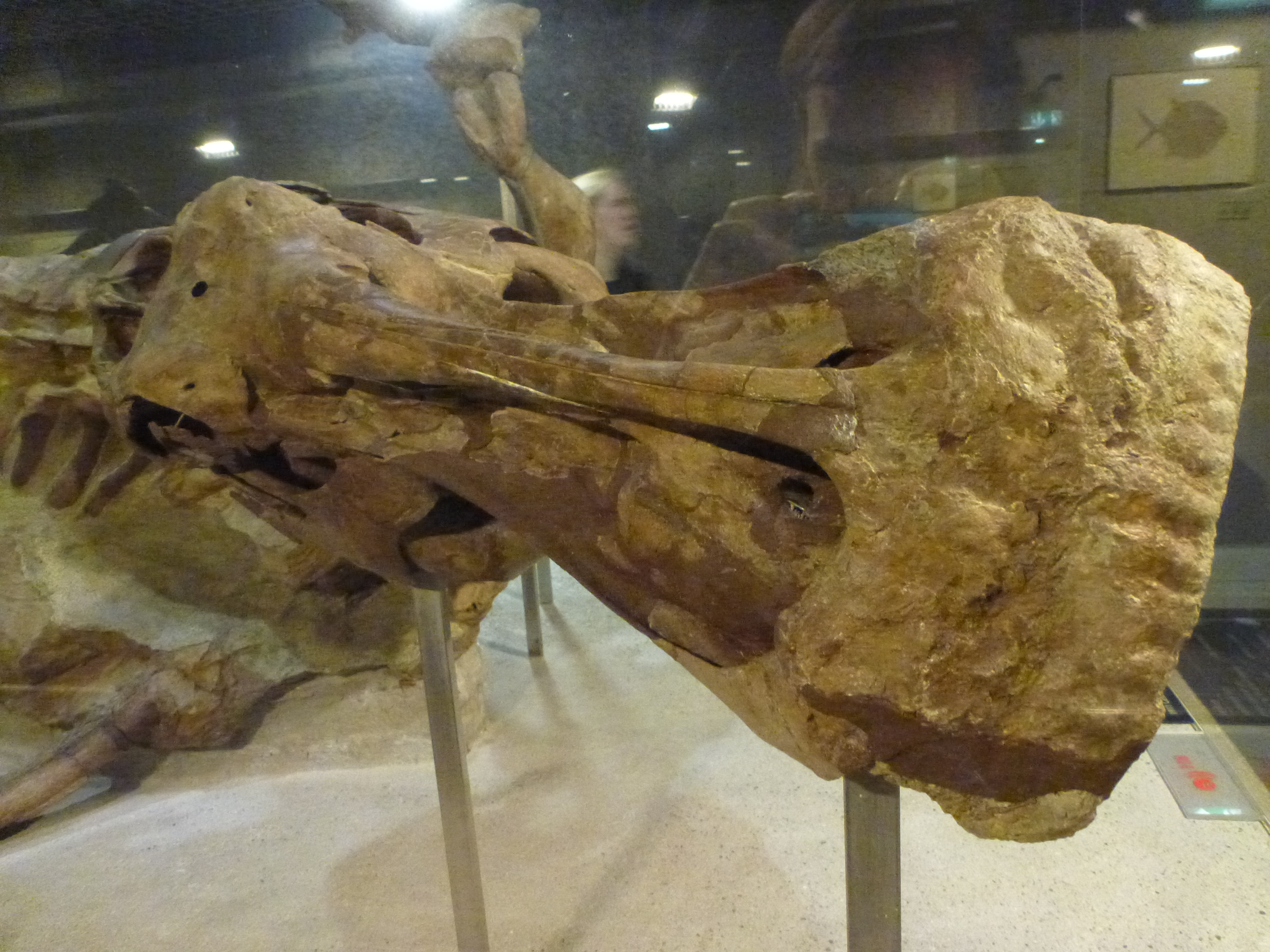
Skull of the mummy in front view

Following the preparation of the mummy in Frankfurt, the paleobotanist Richard Kräusel studied an earthy mass of plant remains found on the pubis in the hip region, which he considered probable stomach contents based on their composition and location. This mass mostly comprised conifer needles (Cunninghamites elegans according to Kräusel) and parts of tree branches, as well as seeds or fruits. These remains suggested a diet consisting of terrestrial plants, conflicting with the prevalent belief at that time that hadrosaurs were aquatic animals. Kräusel therefore suggested that the animal must have left the water for feeding. He presented his findings in 1921 at the annual meeting of the Paläontologische Gesellschaft, the German paleontological society, in Frankfurt. In the discussions following the talk, (Note: Kräusel's presentation was, together with the subsequent discussions, published as short notes in the society's journal in 1922.) Othenio Abel argued that these remains could have simply been washed into the cadaver, a possibility that was considered unlikely by Kräusel, since pollen, fungi, or eggs of water insects, which he would have expected in a washed-in mass, are lacking. Carl Wiman argued that stomach contents do not necessarily reflect an animal's diet, since food items could have been swallowed accidentally, as indicated by plant remains found in specimens of the modern platypus. Drevermann, defending Kräusel's hypothesis, argued that the remains had been found on the pubis bone of the mummy, where they could have fallen when the carcass was lying on its right side.

During the following century, the supposed stomach contents were often regarded as one of the best available pieces of evidence for the diet of Edmontosaurus and hadrosaurids in general, although the credibility of this evidence was repeatedly questioned. Although Sternberg had reported stomach contents from the AMNH mummy, these have never been studied. Ostrom, in his 1964 paper, cited the stomach contents of the Senckenberg mummy as further evidence for a diet consisting of terrestrial plants, questioning the aquatic lifestyle hypothesis which was universally accepted at the time. Later, different authors noted that since the mass was removed from the mummy and macerated it was no longer available for research, and that Kräusel's hypothesis can no longer be validated.

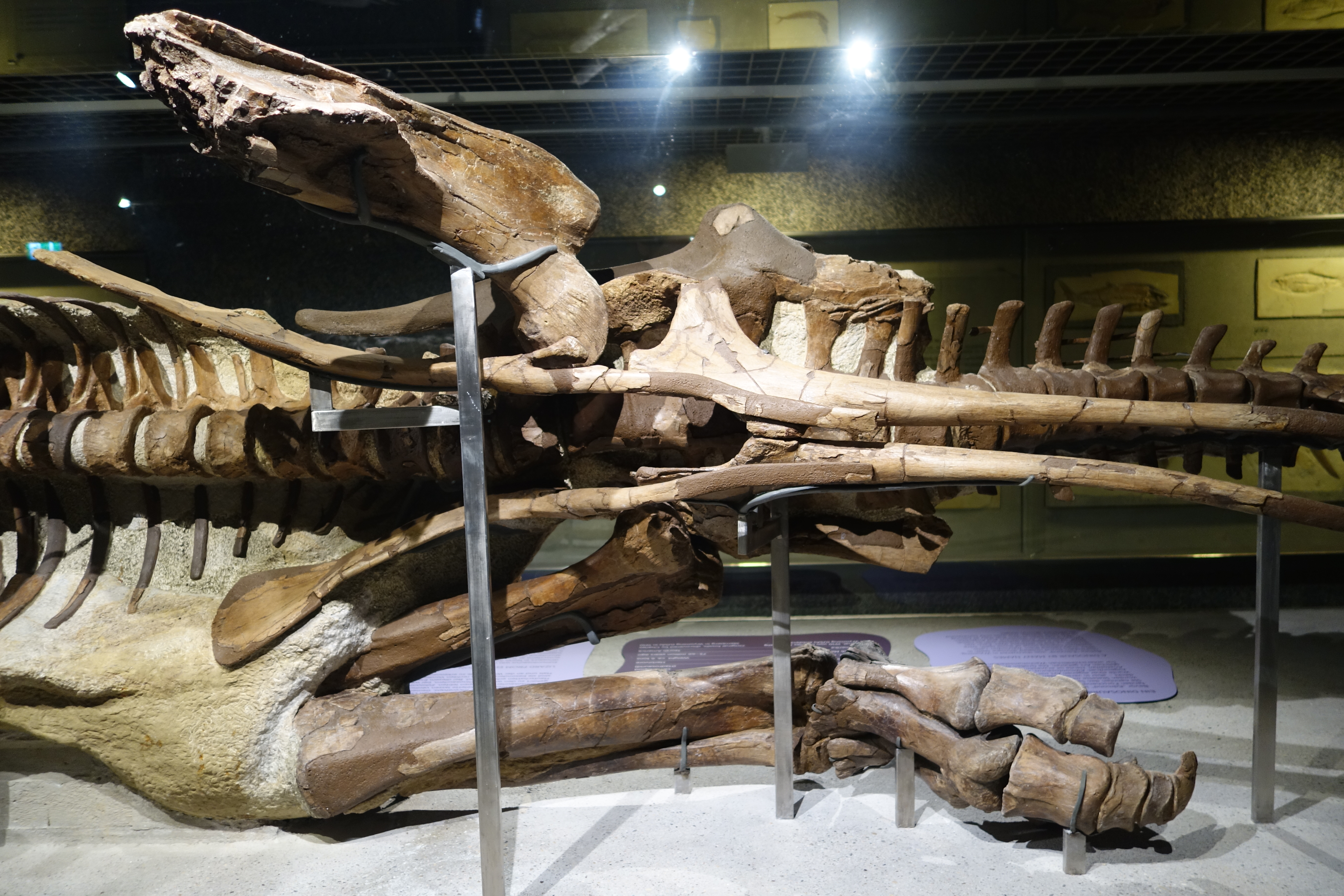
Detail of the hip region and hind limb

Dieter Uhl, in 2020, analyzed the available historic accounts, microscope slides of plant remains prepared by Kräusel, and additional plant remains found within the sandstone that surrounded the mummy. Uhl concluded that Kräusel's plant remains were probably not stomach or gut contents: The plant fragments are much smaller than those of other known hadrosaurid gut contents and coprolites, and are more comparable to the plant remains extracted from the surrounding rock that were transported by water. Furthermore, the mass described by Kräusel was found atop the prepubis of the hip and therefore in the upper region of the body cavity, which is an unlikely location for stomach or gut contents as the animal was found lying on its underside. Uhl hypothesized that the mass of plant remains could have formed after most of the body cavity had already been filled with sand by the action of a river, leaving a chamber that acted as a sediment trap where the fine plant detritus that was suspended in the water could accumulate.

=== Beak and chewing ===
The tip of the snout is strongly widened in top view, reaching a width of 33 cm (13 in). The upper jaw preserves an impression of the horny beak, which is vertical and, in front view, rectangular, with a wavy surface. It protrudes past the lower margin of the upper jaw by c. 8 cm (3.1 in). The lower beak is not preserved but would have been much smaller, fitting within the upper beak to allow for cropping of vegetation. A similar beak impression had been briefly described in 1883 by Edward Cope in his Diclonius mirabilis (now Edmontosaurus annectens). Jan Versluys, in a 1923 publication on the Senckenberg mummy's skull, noted that Cope had assigned the beak to the lower jaw, but that the mummy shows that it actually belonged to the upper. Some early figures published by Cope in the 1880s showed the snout of Trachodon to be flat in side view, similar to the bills of birds such as spoonbills and shovelers. Abel, in 1912, might have been misled by Cope's figures when suggesting that Trachodon would have fed under water in the same fashion as these birds. Versluys argued that Cope's fossils were flattened during fossilization, as the undeformed skull of the mummy demonstrates that the bill was actually quite deep, unlike those of ducks or spoonbills. Versluys suggested that the horny beak might have been used to crop twigs or bark from tree trunks, or plants from stony or sandy ground. Based on the pronounced hyoid bone (tongue bone) of the mummy, Versluys also suggested that Trachodon had a well-developed tongue that was possibly prehensile as in giraffes and could have been used to grasp vegetation.

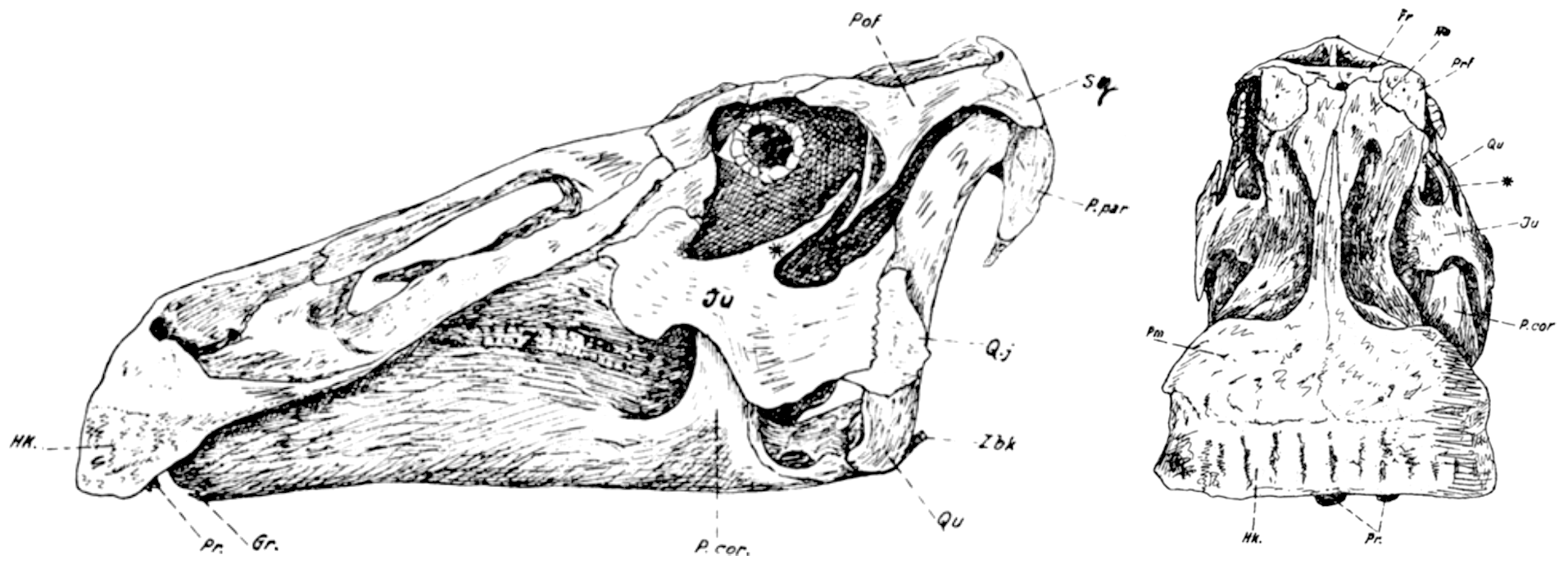
1922 drawing of the skull of the mummy in side and front views

Versluys also attempted to reconstruct the movements of the jaws during chewing. The grinding surfaces of the tooth row are inclined by around 50° and the jaw joint is asymmetric, with a deeper outer part and a shallower inner part. Furthermore, the contact surface of the left and right halves of the lower jaw is smooth, suggesting a flexible symphysis that allowed for movements between the two halves of the lower jaw. Versluys concluded that these features can only be explained by a complex chewing motion that involved a rotation of the lower jaws along their long axes. It is now known that ornithopods indeed developed a sophisticated chewing mechanism with an efficiency that is otherwise only reached by mammals. This mechanism also involves movements of other parts of the skull (pleurokinesis).

== Taphonomy ==
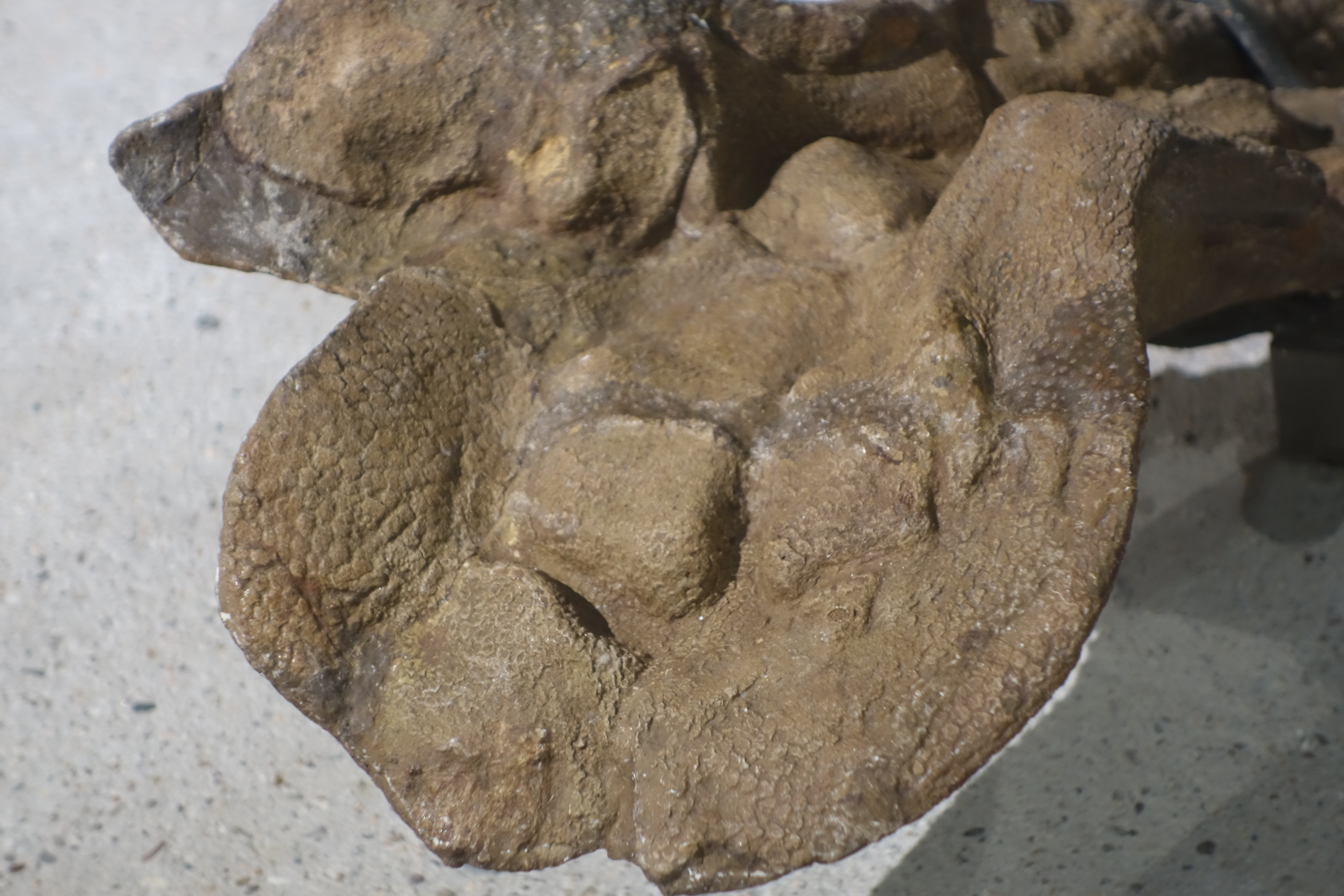
Underside of the hand showing skin impressions

Several authors discussed the question of how the animal died and what circumstances led to its exceptionally good preservation. The AMNH 5060 mummy, which was discovered in the same area, is commonly interpreted as the fossil of a natural mummy that formed by dehydration of the carcass. This is indicated by the close adherence of the skin impressions to the bones, and the fact that they are partially drawn into the body cavity. The Sternbergs noted that the preservation and position of the Senckenberg mummy differed: the skin did not adhere closely to the bone, but rather traced the original body contour. In addition, the mummy was not lying on its back like the AMNH mummy, but on its underside, with one hind limb extended downwards and the other drawn against the body. The forelimbs were stretched upwards, with the palms facing upwards. The mummy was found in an inclined position, with the upward-pointing snout 1.8–2.4 m (6–8 ft) higher than the preserved hind foot, measured perpendicular to the rock layers. The Sternbergs suggested that the animal sank into soft sediment, possibly quicksand, and suffocated; the peculiar position of the specimen would have been the animal's death pose as it struggled to escape. Phil Manning stated in 2008 that the quicksand hypothesis cannot be confirmed by sediment samples of the site of discovery, but agreed that the carcass must have been buried rapidly.

In 2020, Uhl stated that the mummy was surrounded by brownish fine- to medium-grained sandstone, but that sedimentological structures that might indicate the mode of preservation are not visible in surviving rock samples and were not recorded by the Sternbergs. It is likely that the sandstone surrounding the mummy was fluvial (laid down by rivers) and that the mummy was not transported over a long distance before burial, given the well-preserved skin impressions. The body cavity of the mummy contained fossils such as plant remains, leaf impressions, and a fish, which may have been washed into the carcass after the death of the animal.

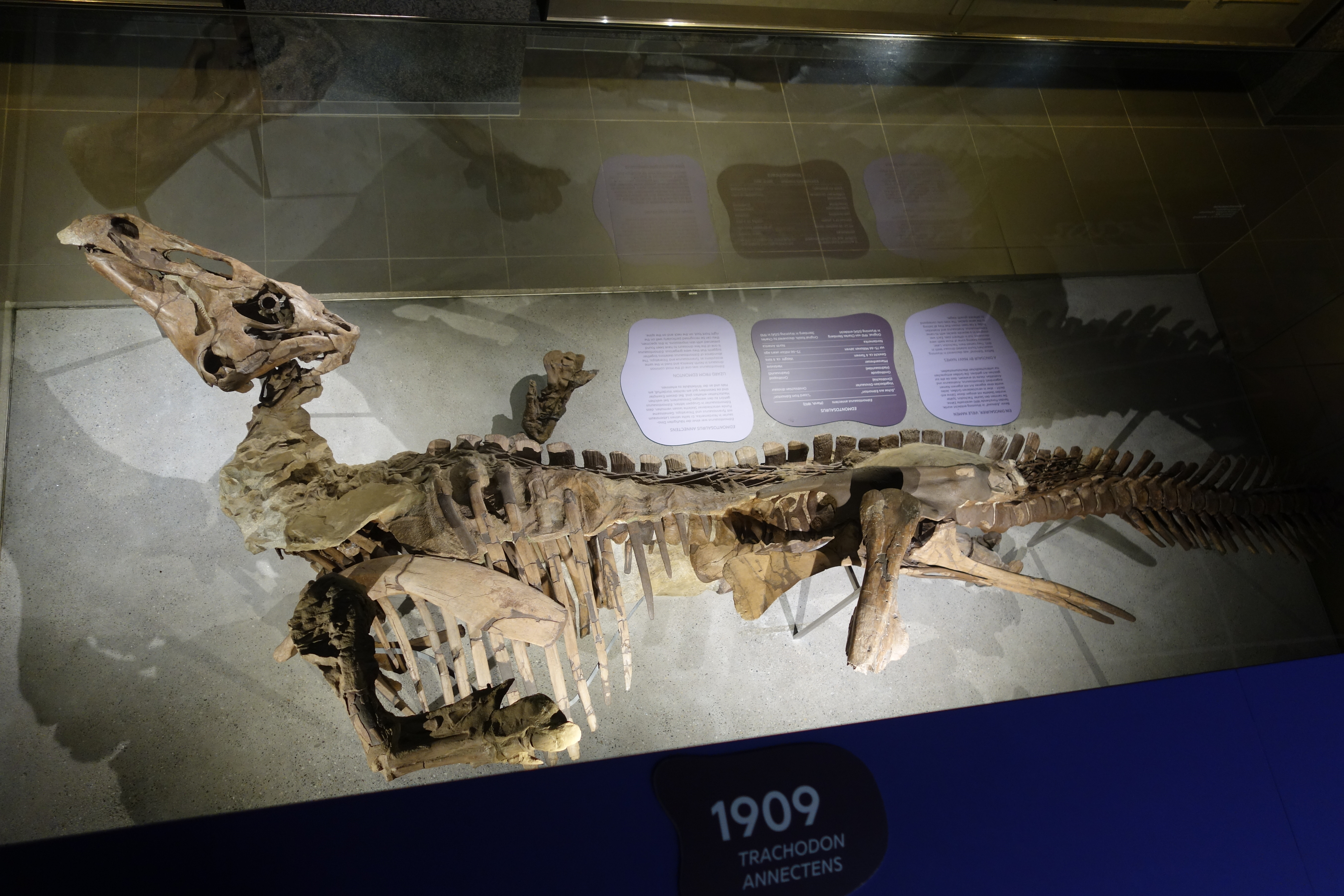
The mummy from above

In 2025, Paul Sereno and colleagues proposed that the Senckenberg mummy and other hadrosaur mummies of the Lance Formation derive from individuals that died in or near a riverbed during a period of drought. None of the mummies show signs of scavenging, possibly because there were so many carcasses available that many remained untouched. After a short transportation by a sudden flood, the mummies would have been rapidly buried. Sereno and colleagues suggested that the entire mummification process from death to burial happened within a single season, probably in a matter of weeks. Once buried, sediment would have quickly entered through holes in the cadaver, filling the body cavity and therefore preserving the three-dimensional shape of the body. A biofilm (layer of microorganisms) would then have formed on the outer surface of the body and attracted clay minerals from the surrounding sediment due to electrostatics, forming a clay layer that is less than 1 mm (0.04 in) in thickness. This clay layer retained the shape of the skin in positive relief after the decay of the latter. Therefore, Sereno and colleagues argued that the skin is not preserved as impressions, despite being commonly referred to as such. Instead, fossils like these should be termed "skin renderings", and, more specifically, "templates" or "masks".

== Locality and paleoenvironment ==
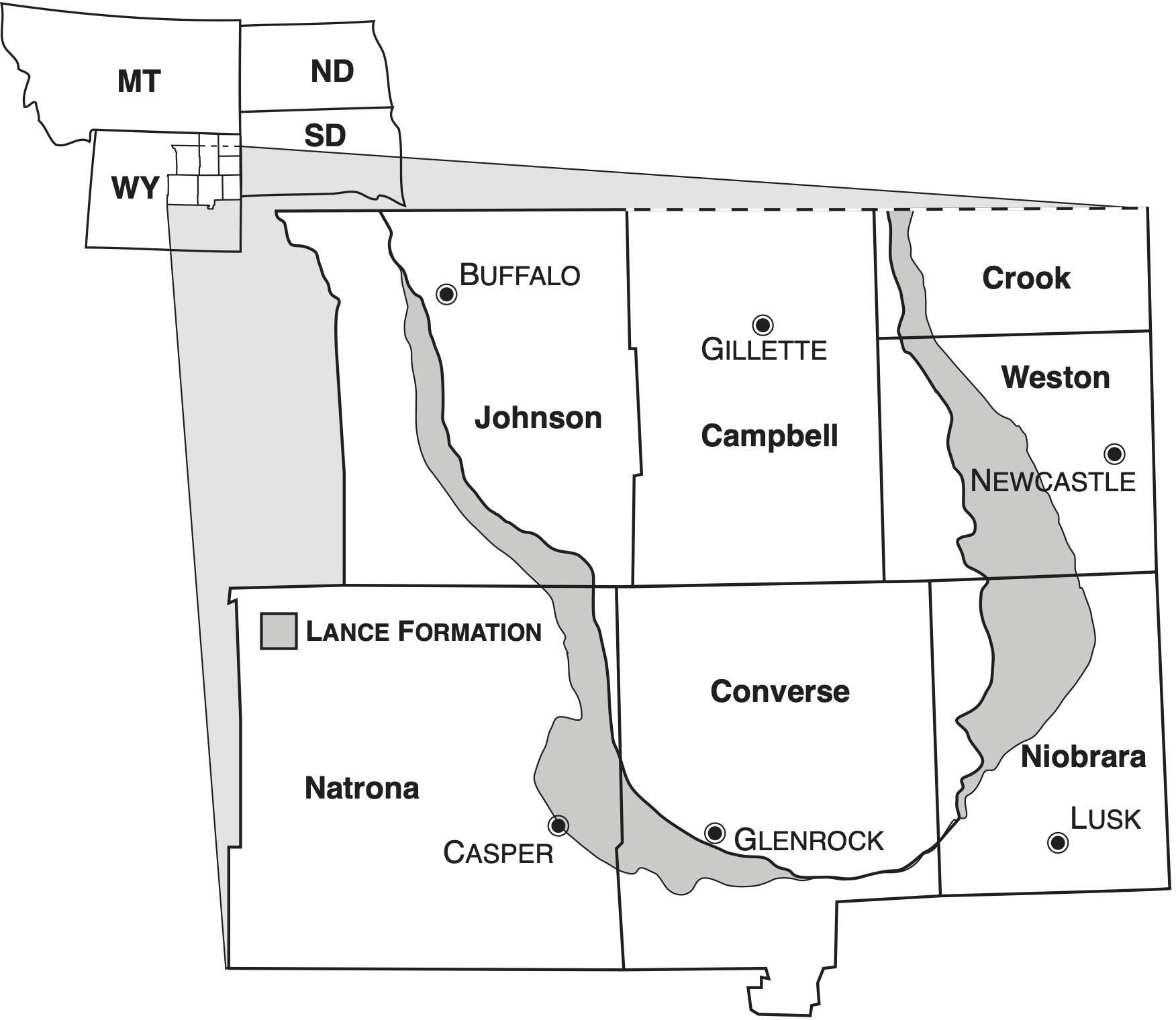
Outcrops of the Lance Formation (gray areas) in Wyoming, United States. The mummy was found in the north of Niobrara County.

The Senckenberg mummy is one of six dinosaur mummies found in a small area measuring 10 km (6.2 mi) in diameter. This area, dubbed the "mummy zone" by Sereno and colleagues in their 2025 study, yielded three other Edmontosaurus mummies, the AMNH mummy as well as "Ed Jr." and "Ed Sr.". The zone also yielded mummified specimens of Triceratops ("Lane") and Tyrannosaurus ("Rex Jr."). Sereno and colleagues determined that the coordinates of the Senckenberg mummy's discovery site are approximately 43°24′56″N 104°35′24″W. Therefore, the Senckenberg mummy is the northernmost mummy of the zone, having been discovered 6 km (3.7 mi) northeast of the AMNH mummy. Vertically, the "mummy zone" encompasses 100 m (330 ft) of the upper part of the Lance Formation. The Senckenberg mummy was probably discovered at an altitude of c. 1,210 m (3,970 ft), and is therefore the lowest (and oldest) mummy of the zone. Sereno and colleagues argued that the "mummy zone" was an area of rapid subsidence (downward movement of the Earth's surface) that resulted in high sedimentation rates, and was subjected to pronounced cycles of droughts and subsequent floods. The combination of these factors would have resulted in the exceptional abundance of mummies. These authors also argued that Edmontosaurus mummies are comparatively common because this genus preferred habitats closer to the coast where sedimentation rates were higher, while Triceratops tends to occur further inland.

In a 2021 study, Haytham El Atfy and Uhl analyzed microscopic plant material extracted from rock samples recovered from the body cavity of the mummy. To isolate this material, the rock samples were dissolved using acids; two out of seven samples yielded useful contents. The most common component of the extracted material was charcoal, suggesting that wildfires would have been frequent in the Lance Formation habitat. Spores, especially those of mosses and ferns such as Azolla, were more common than angiosperm and gymnosperm pollen. Angiosperm pollen confirm a late Maastrichtian age, close to the Cretaceous–Paleogene extinction event around 66.043 million years ago. The recorded plant species suggest a forested habitat, with an understory dominated by ferns, mosses, and angiosperms, and an upper story comprising conifers (Pinaceae and Cupressaceae) and cycads. The climate was probably warm and humid.
