= Artoriellula =

Scientific classification
- Kingdom: Animalia
- Phylum: Arthropoda
- Subphylum: Chelicerata
- Class: Arachnida
- Order: Araneae
- Infraorder: Araneomorphae
- Family: Lycosidae
- Genus: Artoriellula; Roewer

Species
- A. bicolor (Simon, 1898); A. celebensis (Merian, 1911)

Genus of spiders

Artoriellula is a genus of spiders in the family Lycosidae that was first described in 1960 by Roewer.

== Distribution ==
One species is endemic to South Africa, the other to Sulawesi (Indonesia)..

== Life style ==
They are free-running ground dwellers.

== Description ==
Artoriellula are small to medium-sized wolf spiders with a total length of approximately 2.5 to 10 mm, with males slightly smaller than females.

The carapace is brown to black with a darker radial pattern, and light median and lateral bands are sometimes present. The eyes in the posterior row are large and positioned near the edge. The carapace is longer than wide with a straight dorsal profile in lateral view. The head flanks in frontal view are steep in most males but may have a gentle slope in females.

Chelicerae bear three (rarely one or two) promarginal and three (rarely one or two) retromarginal teeth. The labium is as long as or slightly longer than wide.

The abdomen is brown to dark grey, often with a mottled pattern and mostly with a light lanceolate heart mark.

== Species ==
As of October 2025, this genus includes two species:

- Artoriellula bicolor (Simon, 1898) – South Africa (type species)
- Artoriellula celebensis (Merian, 1911) – Indonesia (Sulawesi)
