= Walter Häntzschel =

German paleontologist (1904–1972)

Walter Helmut Häntzschel (16 November 1904 – 10 May 1972) was a German paleontologist. He published an influential Treatise on Invertebrate Paleontology (1975) that made trace fossils and ichnotaxa an area of active research.

Häntzschel was born in Dresden to school teacher Theodor Johannes and Minna Müller. He studied at the Dresden Realgymnasium and joined the Technical University where he studied the natural sciences. He then taught from 1930 to 1934 at a local high school while also working on his doctorate in 1932. He joined the Senckenberg marine paleontological research station at Wilhelmshaven and in 1938 became curator at the State Museum for Mineralogy and Geology in Dresden. He was conscripted during the war and became a prisoner of war, held in Russia until 1948. He then joined the University of Halle and in 1949 curator at the State Geological Institute in Hamburg working there until retirement in 1969.

Häntzschel married Marianne Krausse in 1936 and they had two daughters.
