= Naturmuseum Senckenberg =

Museum of natural history in Frankfurt

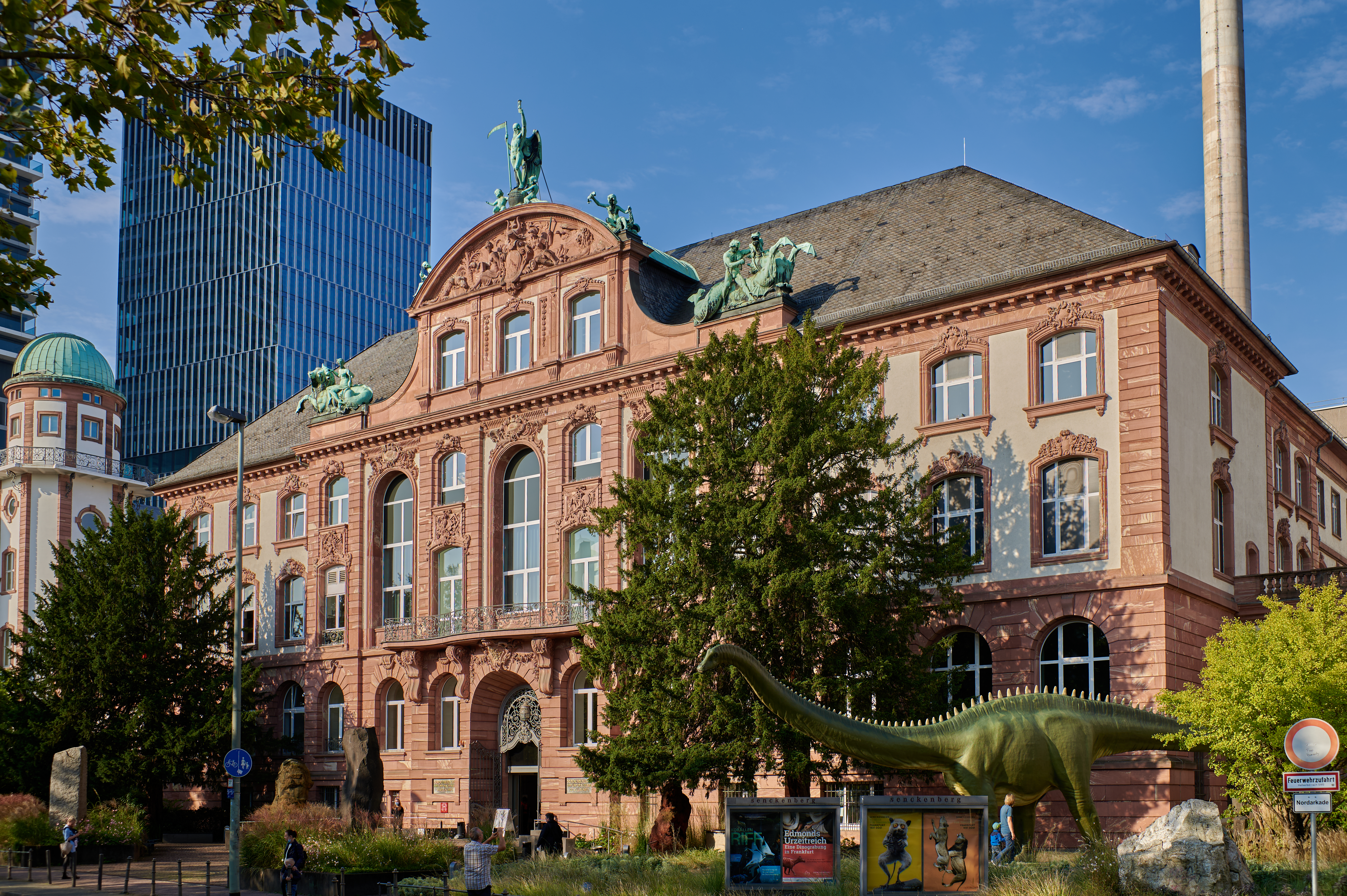
- The Naturmuseum Senckenberg in 2021
- Former name: Öffentliches Naturalienkabinett
- Established: 1821
- Location: Senckenberganlage 25, Frankfurt, Germany
- Coordinates: 50°07′03″N 8°39′06″E
- Type: Natural history
- Key holdings: Triceratops (skulls), Edmontosaurus mummy SMF R 4036, Psittacosaurus SMF R 4970, Diplodocus SMF R 462, Placodus gigas SMF R 1035, Eurohippus messelensis SMF ME 11034, Dodo, Quagga
- Collections: Dinosaurs, Insects, Birds, Reptiles, Mammals, Human evolution, Messel Research
- Collection size: 40,800,000 specimens; 10,000 exhibits
- Visitors: 874,276 (2022–2023); 220,740 (2021); 196,160 (2020); 398,754 (2019); 363,244 (2018)
- Founders: Senckenberg Nature Research Society, (namesake: Johann Christian Senckenberg)
- Director: Saskia Benthack
- Architect: Ludwig Neher
- Owner: Senckenberg Nature Research Society
- Employees: 843
- Public transit access: Bockenheimer Warte (3 min); Frankfurt West station (10 min); 32 Senckenbergmuseum
- Website: museumfrankfurt.senckenberg.de

The Naturmuseum Senckenberg (SMF) is a museum of natural history, located in Frankfurt am Main. It is the second-largest natural history museum in Germany. In the two years 2022–2023, 874,276 people visited the museum, which is owned by the Senckenberg Nature Research Society. Senckenberg's slogan is "world of biodiversity". As of 2019, the museum exhibits 18 reconstructed dinosaurs.

== History ==
In 1763, Johann Christian Senckenberg donated his entire fortune (95,000 guilders) to establish a community hospital and promote scientific projects. Senckenberg died in 1772. In 1817, 32 Frankfurt citizens founded the non-profit Senckenberg Nature Research Society, German: Senckenberg Gesellschaft für Naturforschung (SGN), which is a member of the Leibniz Association. Soon after the society's founding, the physician Johann Georg Neuburg donated his collection of bird and mammal specimens to the society. The Naturmuseum Senckenberg was founded in 1821, just four years later. (Note: The museum was opened to the public on 22 November 1821.)

Initially located near the Eschenheimer Turm, the museum moved to a new building on Senckenberganlage in 1907. In 1896 a mummified Egyptian child in their collection (inventory number ÄS 18) was the subject of the first mummy X-ray. During World War II, the building was partly destroyed. (Note: Bombing of Frankfurt am Main in World War II, on 22 March 1944.) However, the exhibits had been evacuated before.

=== Expansion plans ===
As of 2018, the museum has been expanded to 10,000 m^{2} (110,000 ft^{2}). (Note: Including buildings Alte Physik (south) and Jügelbau (north) by architect Peter Kulka.) New planned sections: Human, Earth, Cosmos, Future.

== Directors ==
- 2006–2019 Bernd Herkner
- 2019–2021: Eva Rossmanith (Interim)
- 2021–2024 Brigitte Franzen
- 2024–2026 Eva Roßmanith (Interim)
- Since 1 November 2026: Saskia Benthack

== General directors, Senckenberg Nature Research Society ==
- 2006–2021 Volker Mosbrugger
- 2021–present Klement Tockner

== Building ==
The neo-baroque building housing the Senckenberg Museum was erected between 1904 and 1907 by the architect Ludwig Neher outside the city center of Frankfurt in the same area as the Johann Wolfgang Goethe University, which was founded in 1914. Neher also oversaw the construction of the Jügelhaus, a neo-baroque building for the Academy for Social and Commercial Sciences in 1906. The Jügelhaus was the main building of the Goethe University Frankfurt until 2012. The building is currently owned by the Senckenberg Nature Research Society and used as a research building.

The museum is owned and operated by the Senckenberg Nature Research Society. The exhibition area covers 6,000 m^{2} (65,000 ft^{2}).

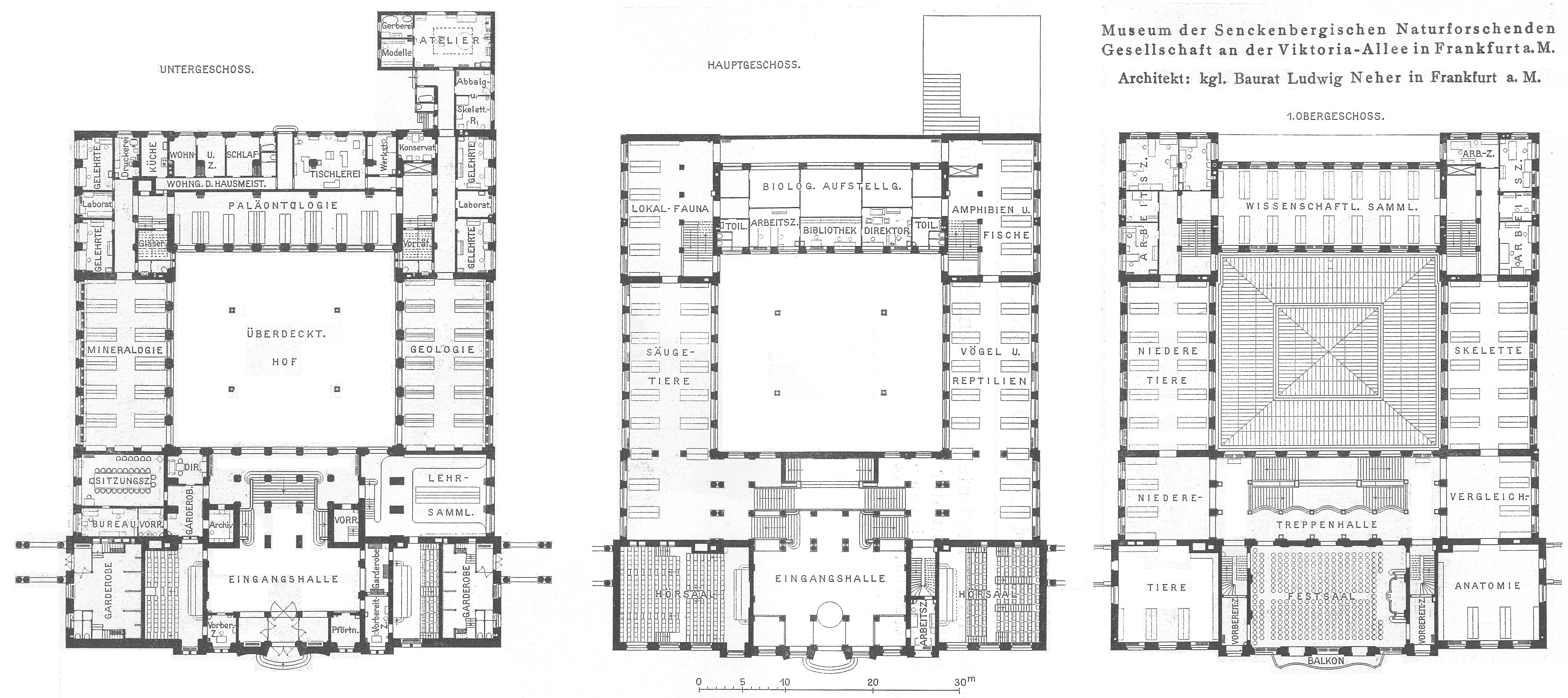
Floor plans of the basement, ground floor and first floor of the Senckenberg Museum at the time of construction, published 1908

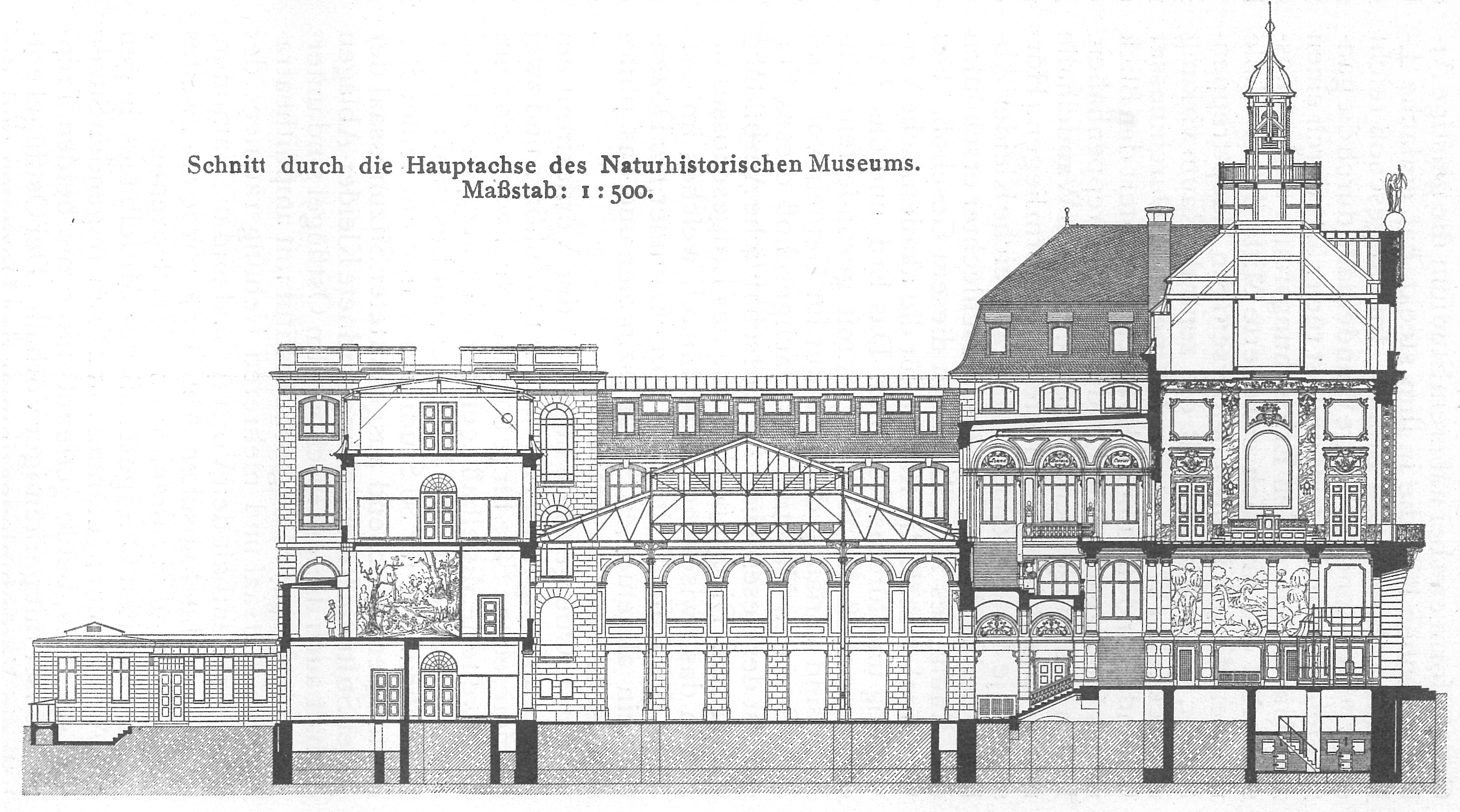
Cross section through the main axis of the Senckenberg Museum, published 1908

== Collections ==
The Senckenberg Museum Frankfurt has a large collection of animal, plant and geology exhibits from every epoch of Earth's history.

=== Dinosaurs ===
==== Diplodocus ====
Main attraction is a Diplodocus from Bone Cabin Quarry, Wyoming, donated by the American Museum of Natural History on the occasion of the present museum building's inauguration on 13 October 1907, The 18 m (59 ft) mounted skeleton with additions contains bones of three different sauropod genera (Diplodocus and closely related Apatosaurus and Barosaurus).

==== Psittacosaurus ====
As of 2022, a key holding is a fossilized Psittacosaurus (specimen SMF R 4970) from Liaoning, China, with clear bristles around its tail and visible fossilized stomach contents. The specimen was first reported in 2002. The exact date and locality of the discovery within Liaoning is unknown. A controversial debate regarding the legal ownership arose. In 2021, researchers described its cloaca in more detail and found similarities with the body outlet of birds. In 2022, for the first time a belly button was found in a dinosaur fossil. A physical life reconstruction of the animal was prepared by paleoartist Robert Nicholls.

==== Edmontosaurus and Triceratops ====
Other originals include an Edmontosaurus annectens mummy (specimen SMF R 4036) from Lance Formation, Wyoming. and two Triceratops skulls. The museum bought the three specimen from fossil collector Charles Hazelius Sternberg and his sons in the early 20th century. The museum also exhibits a cast of a complete Triceratops, the museum's mascot.

==== Casts ====
Big public attractions also include the casts of Tyrannosaurus rex (Note: Copy of a Tyrannosaurus located at the American Museum of Natural History in New York.) and Diplodocus longus (in front of the museum), an Iguanodon, the crested Hadrosaur Parasaurolophus and an Oviraptor.

Further casts or single bones:

- Archaeopteryx lithographica
- Amargasaurus cazaui
- Argentinosaurus huinculensis
- Austroraptor cabazai
- Brachiosaurus brancai
- Carnotaurus sastrei
- Compsognathus longipes
- Deinonychus
- Eoraptor lunensis
- Euoplocephalus tutus
- Giganotosaurus carolinii
- Kritosaurus australis
- Panphagia protos
- Plateosaurus engelhardti
- Protoceratops
- Sinosauropteryx prima
- Stegosaurus stenops
- Velociraptor

=== Birds ===
A living reconstruction of the extinct dodo and many other stuffed birds are shown in a permanent exhibition in the upper level. Additionally, the museum owns a large and diverse collection of birds with 90,000 bird skins, 5,050 egg sets, 17,000 skeletons, and 3,375 spirit specimens (a specimen preserved in fluid). This is 75% of the known bird species, only a minor part is exhibited.

=== Reptiles ===
The Anaconda exhibit is one of the oldest and most popular. Since the remodeling finished in 2003, a new reptile exhibit addresses both the biodiversity of reptiles and amphibians and the topic of nature conservation.

=== Messel research ===
The museum houses many originals from the nearby Messel pit, Germany's first UNESCO World Natural Heritage Site, among them a predecessor to the modern horse that lived about 50 million years ago and stood less than 60 cm (24 in) tall. In 2015, researchers found a foal fetus in the body of the petrified primeval horse mare. Also primates, crocodiles, bats, snakes, turtles and other fossils were found at Messel pit.

=== Mammals ===
Display collections full of stuffed animals are arranged in the upper levels; among other things one can see one of twenty existing examples of the quagga, which has been extinct since 1883.

The mammal collection focuses on bats, primates, rodents, and insectivores (not exhibited).

=== Human evolution ===
Unique in Europe is a cast of the famous Lucy, (Note: The original Lucy is stored in a safe at the National Museum of Ethiopia in Addis Ababa, Ethiopia.) an almost complete skeleton of the upright, 1 m (3 ft 3 in) tall, hominid Australopithecus afarensis. The exhibition also includes reconstructions of the heads of human ancestors.

== Gallery ==
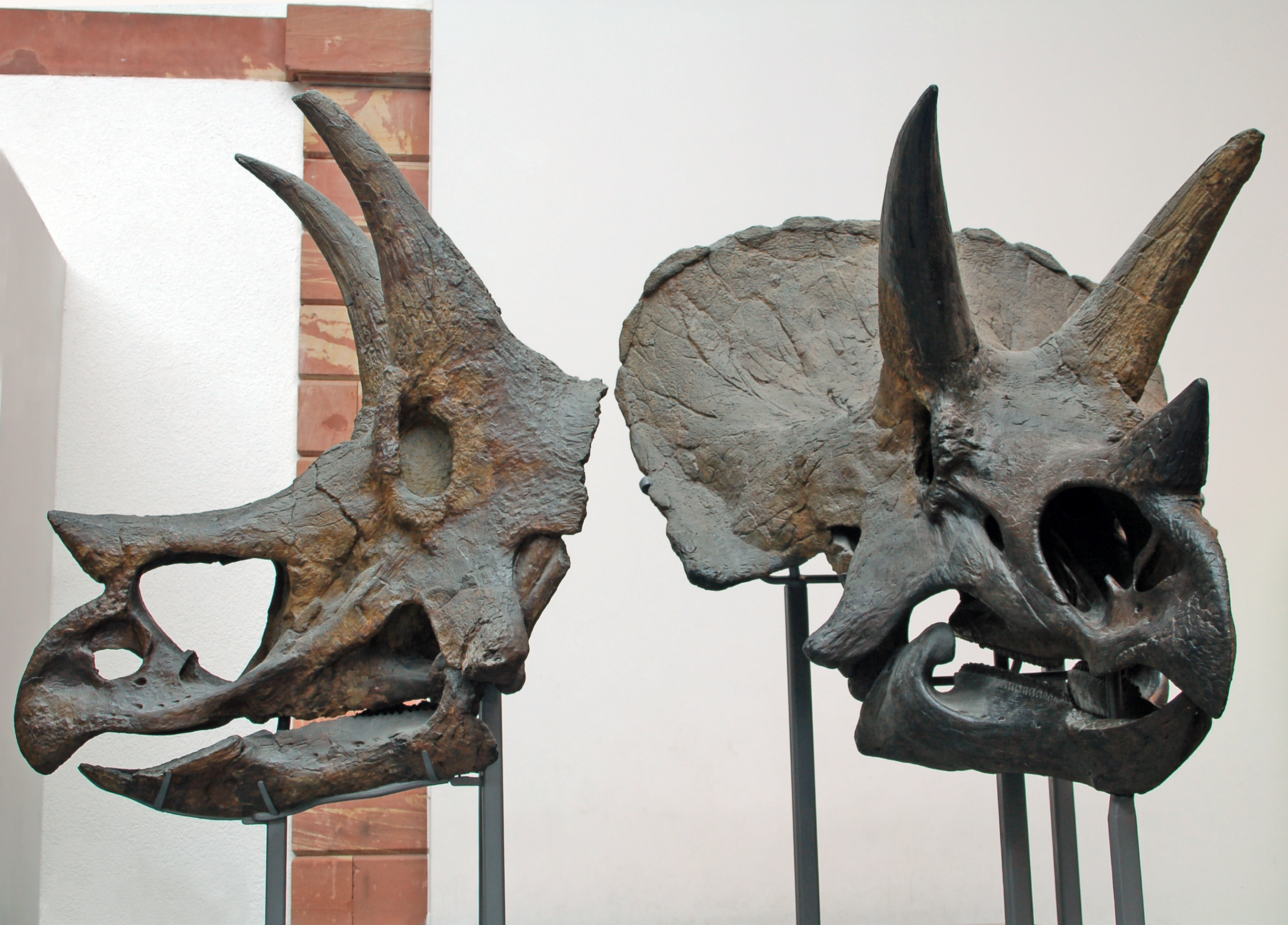
Original Triceratops skulls

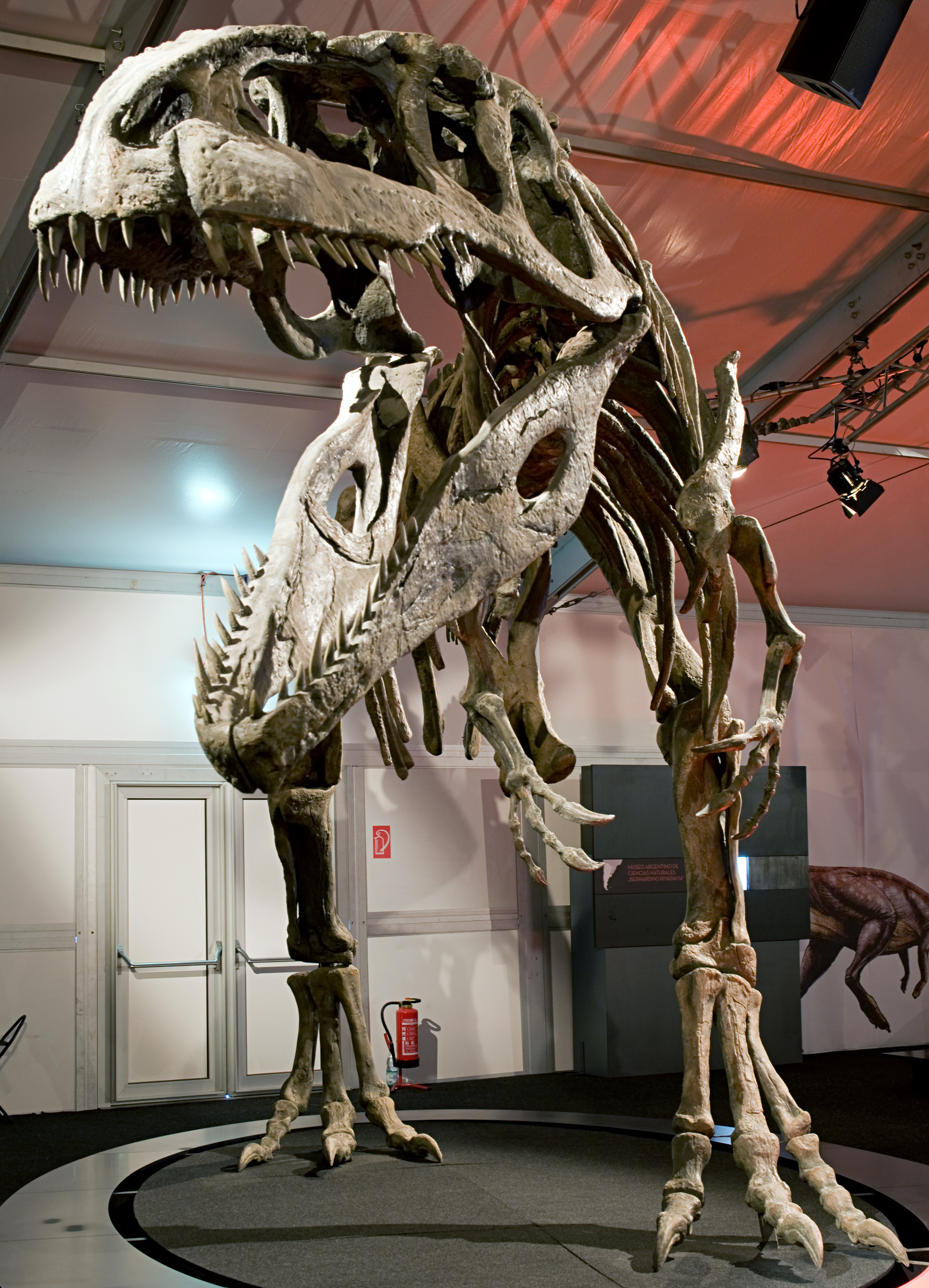
Reconstructed skeleton of Giganotosaurus carolinii

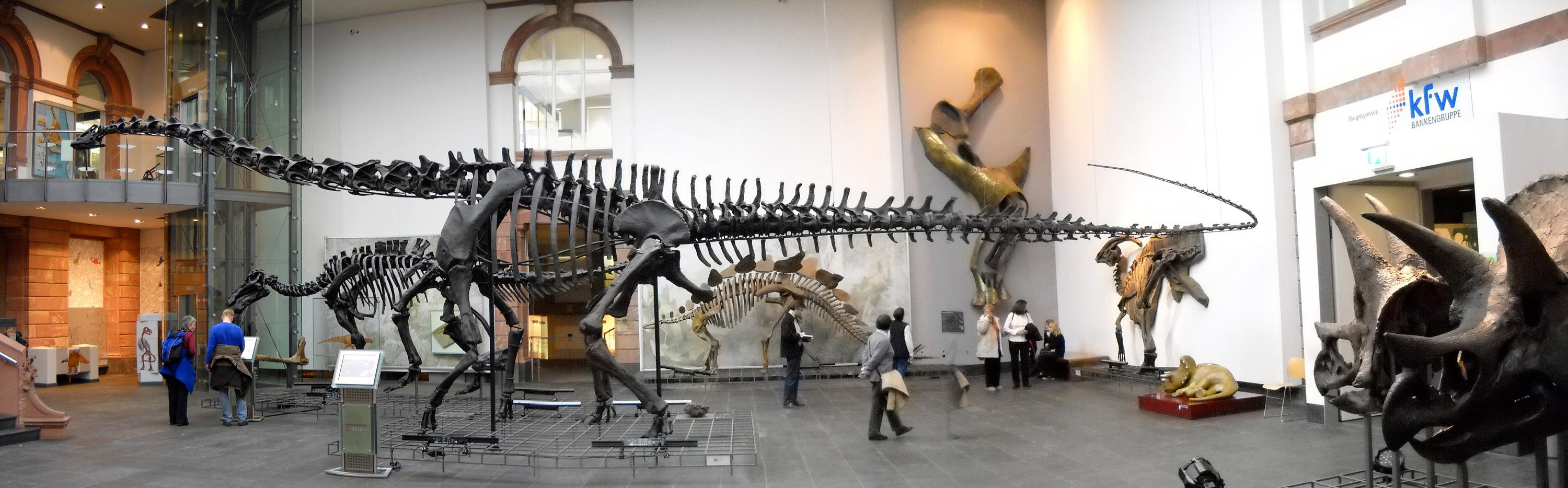
Original Diplodocus

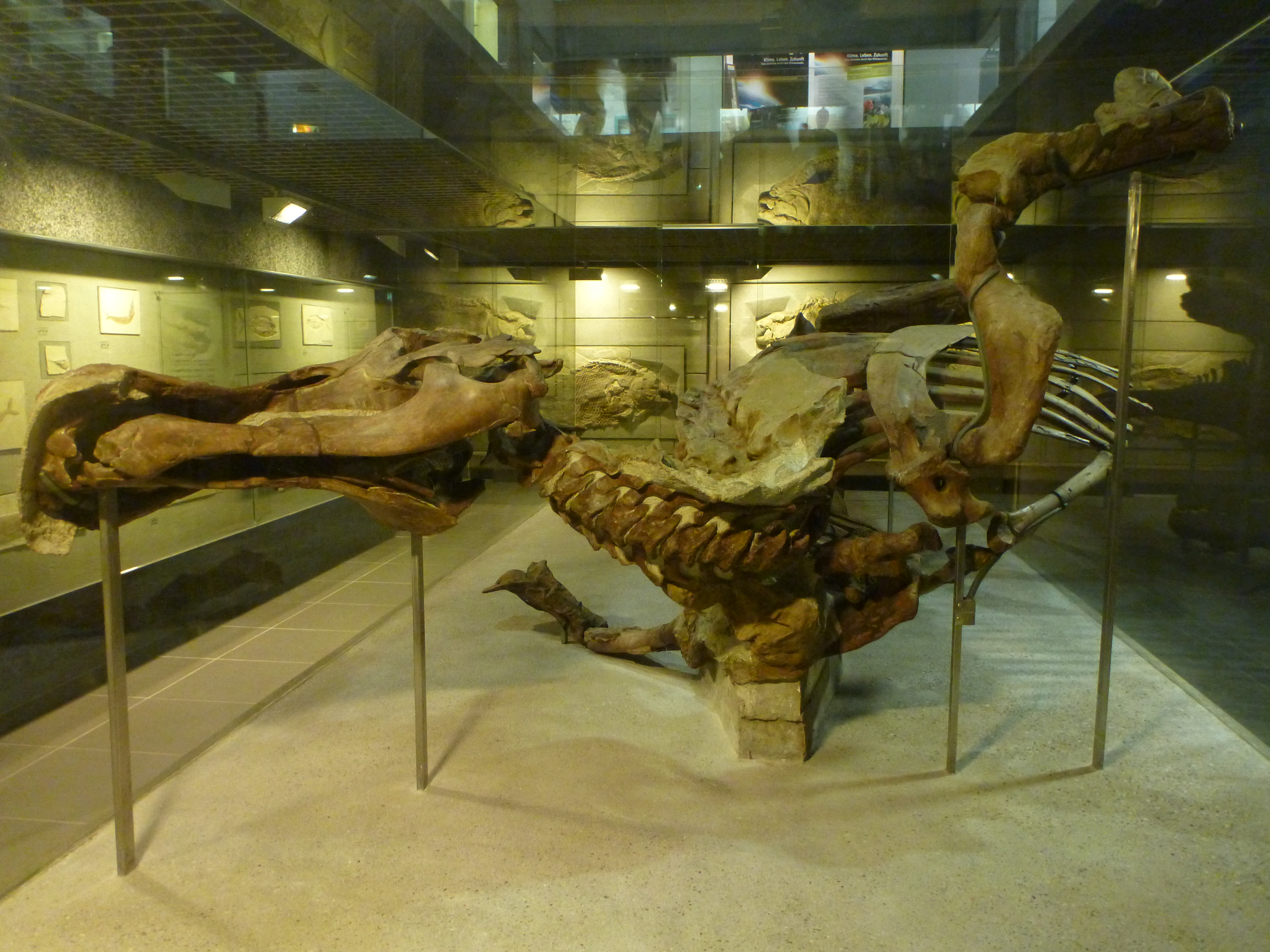
Original Edmontosaurus mummy

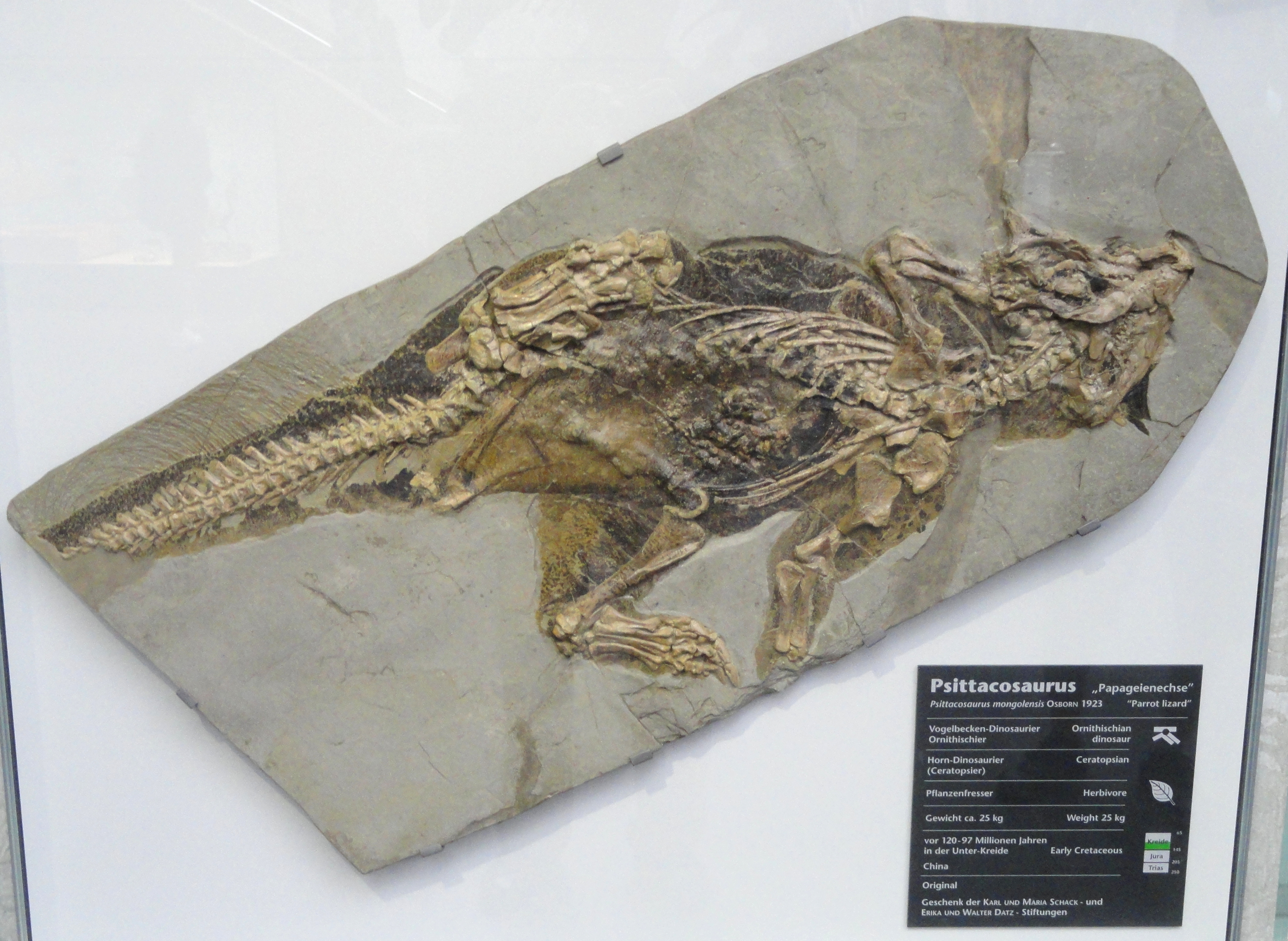
Original Psittacosaurus

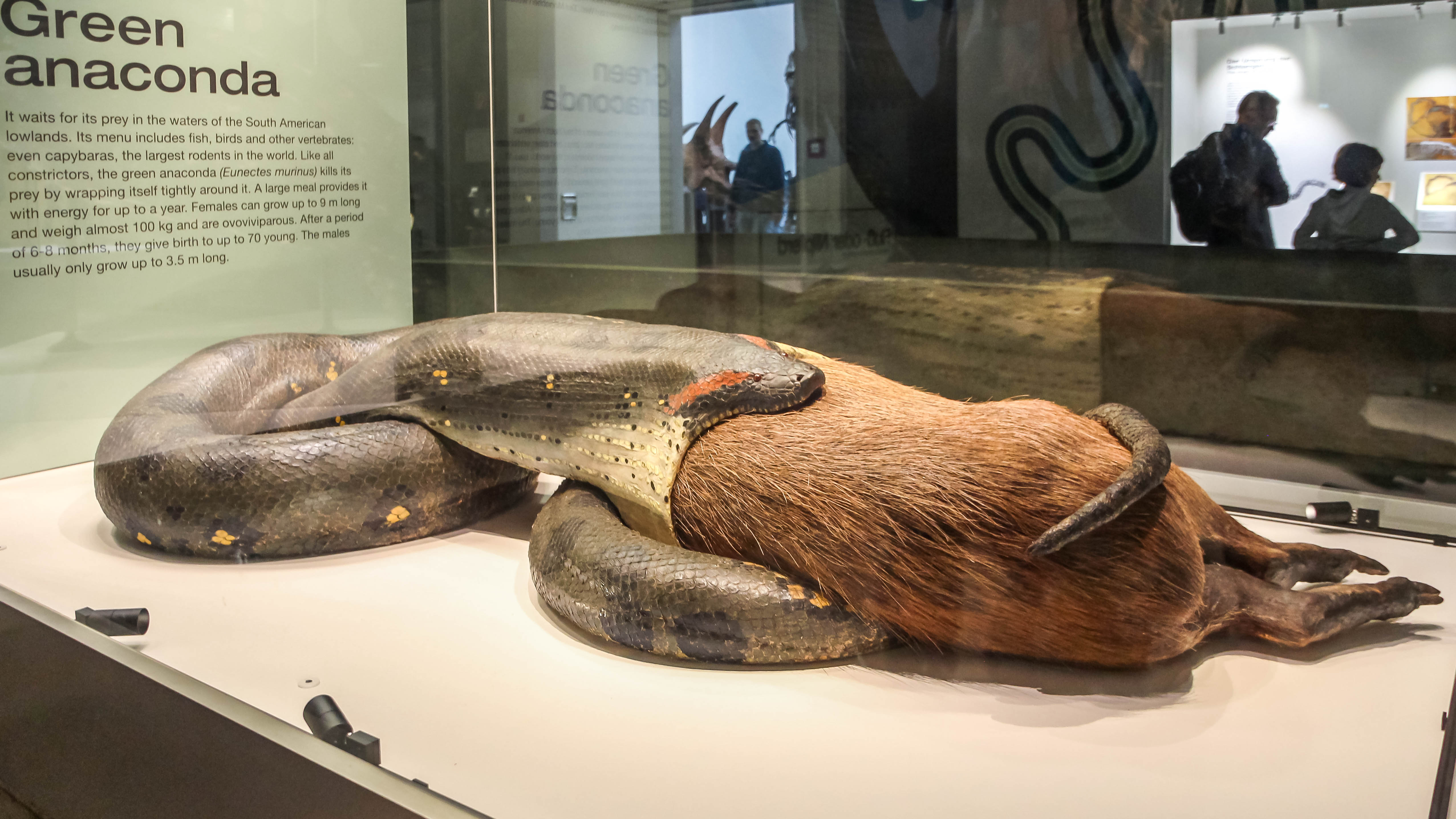
Green Anaconda (Eunectes murinus) devours a capybara (Hydrochoerus hydrochaeris)

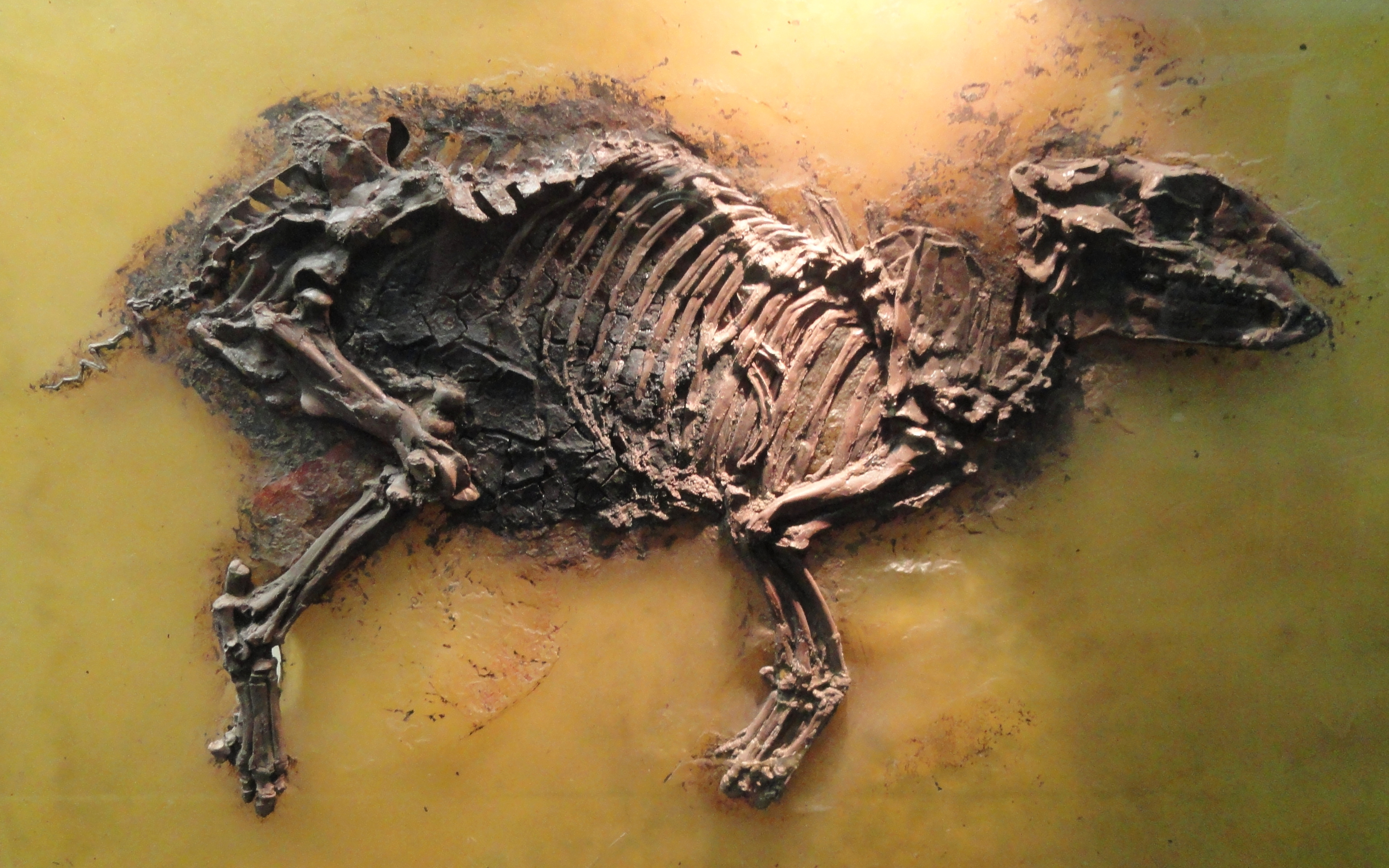
Original fossil of the primitive horse Eurohippus messelensis, extracted from the Messel Pit

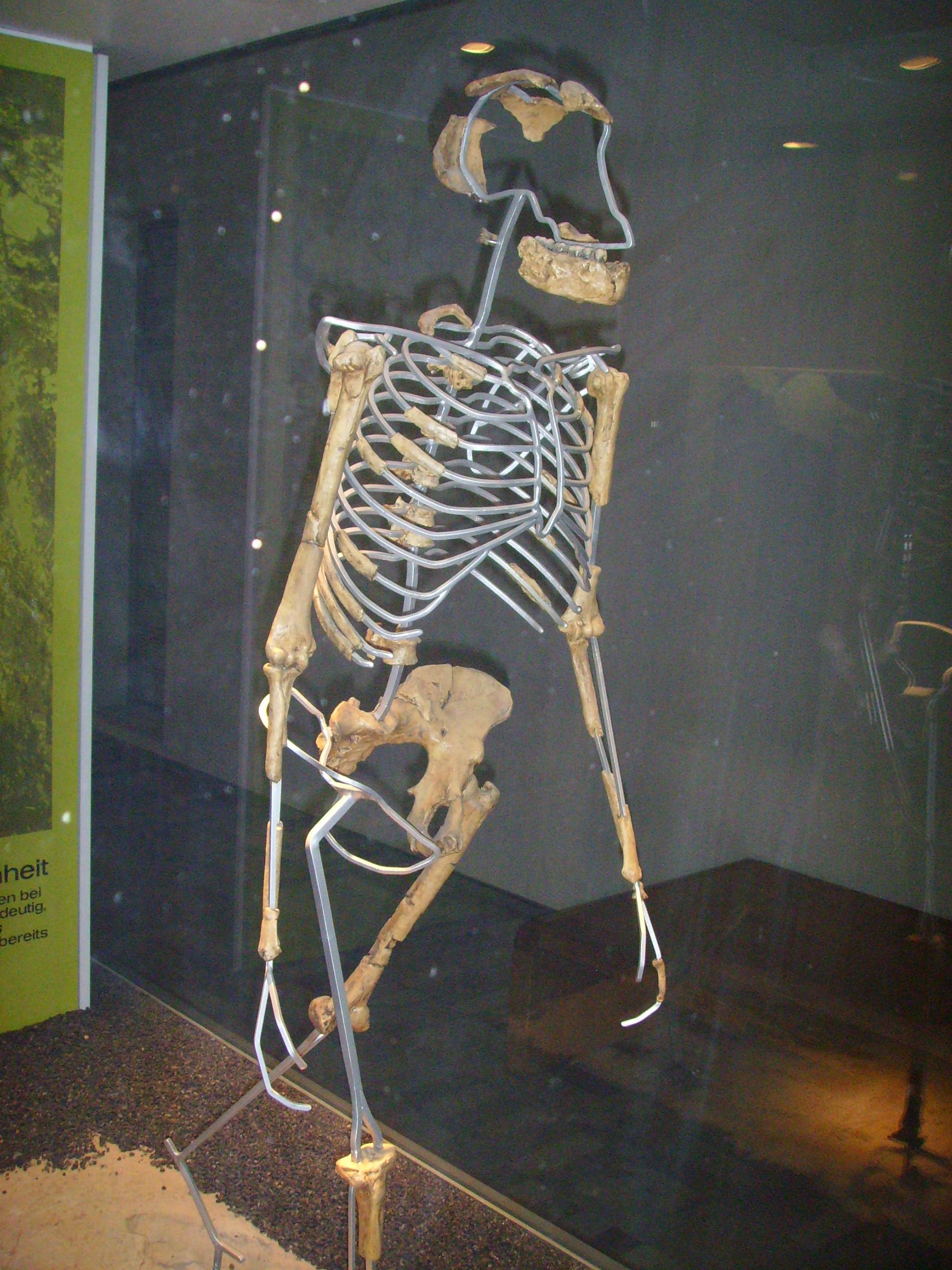
Reconstructed skeleton of an Australopithecus afarensis ("Lucy")

== Permanent exhibitions ==
- 2025 Brains

== See also ==
- Museumsufer
- Edmontosaurus mummy SMF R 4036
- Messel pit
- Museum of Natural History, Görlitz
