= Bone bed =

Geological stratum or deposit containing bones

A bone bed is any geological stratum or deposit that contains bones of any kind. Inevitably, such deposits are sedimentary in nature. Not a formal term, it tends to be used more to describe especially dense collections such as Lagerstätte. It is also applied to brecciated and stalagmitic deposits on the floor of caves, which frequently contain osseous remains.

In a more restricted sense, the term is used to describe certain thin layers of bony fragments, which occur in well-defined geological strata. One of the best-known of these is the Ludlow Bone Bed, which is found at the base of the Downton Sandstone in the Upper Ludlow series. At Ludlow (England) itself, two such beds are actually known, separated by about 14 ft (4.3 m). of strata. Although quite thin, the Ludlow Bone Bed can be followed from that town into Gloucestershire, for a distance of 45 miles (72 km). It is almost completely made up of fragments of spines, teeth and scales of ganoid fish. Another well-known bed, formerly known as the Bristol or Lias Bone Bed, exists in the form of several thin layers of micaceous sandstone, with the remains of fish and saurians, which occur in the Rhaetic Black Paper Shales that lie above the Keuper marls, in the south-west of England. A similar bone bed has been traced on the same geological horizon in Brunswick, Hanover (Germany), in Franconia and in Tübingen (Germany). A bone bed has also been observed at the base of the Carboniferous limestone series, in certain parts of the south-west of England.

Bone beds are also recorded in North America, South America, Mongolia and China. Terrestrial bonebed examples are: the Triassic Metoposaurus bone bed from Portugal, the Mapusaurus bone bed at Cañadón del Gato, in Argentina, the Allosaurus-dominated Cleveland-Lloyd Dinosaur Quarry of Utah, the Dinosaur National Monument on the boundary of Utah and Colorado, an Albertosaurus bonebed from Alberta, a Daspletosaurus bone bed from Montana, the Cenozoic John Day Fossil Beds of Oregon, a Triceratops bonebed from Montana, a Centrosaurus bonebed in Alberta, a Styracosaurus bone bed in Alberta, an Edmontosaurus annectens bone bed in Wyoming, an Edmontosaurus regalis bone bed in Alberta, a Gryposaurus bone bed in the Oldman Formation, a Pachyrhinosaurus bone bed in the Wapiti Formation, and the Nemegt Basin in the Gobi Desert region of Mongolia, specifically the Saurolophus bone bed known as the Dragon's Tomb. Bentiaba, Angola, is an example of a marine bonebed with numerous mosasaurs and plesiosaurs. Another example of a marine bonebed is the Sharktooth Hill Bonebed located in the Temblor Formation in California.

Fossil bonebeds don't always consist of one single species, but rather many species of organisms. There are several of the bonebeds known throughout North America. Two of the best examples include the Mixson's Bone Bed of Florida, whose geological settings preserved the remains of Ambelodon, Aepycamelus, and Cormohipparion, and the Agate Fossil Beds in Nebraska which has the fossils of abundant creatures such as Menoceras, Stenomylus, and Daphoenodon.
