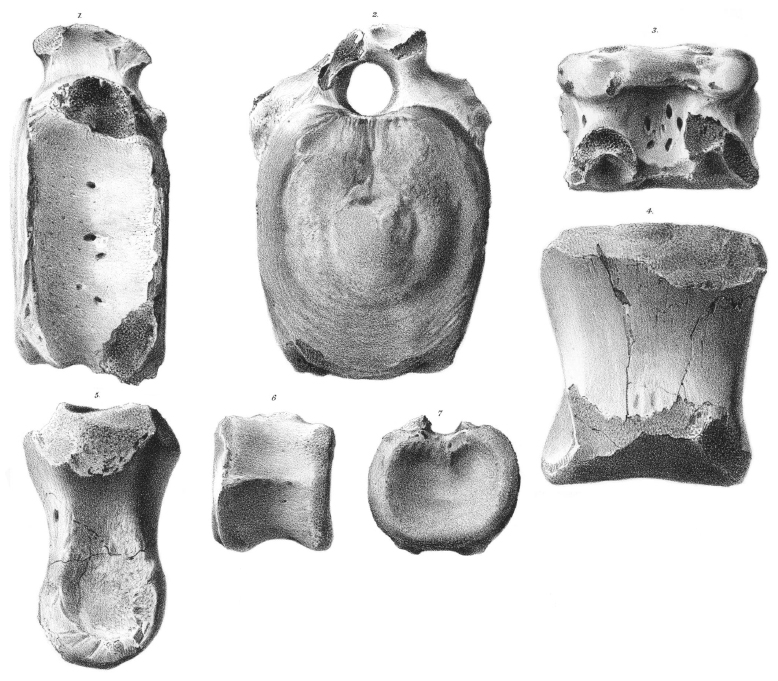
- The syntype fossils

Scientific classification
- Kingdom: Animalia
- Phylum: Chordata
- Class: Reptilia
- Clade: Dinosauria
- Clade: †Ornithischia
- Clade: †Ornithopoda
- Family: †Hadrosauridae
- Subfamily: †Saurolophinae
- Genus: †Thespesius; Leidy, 1856
- Species: †T. occidentalis

Binomial name
- †Thespesius occidentalis Leidy, 1856

Synonyms
- Agathaumas milo Cope, 1874

= Thespesius =

Thespesius Temporal range: Late Cretaceous, 66 Ma

Dubious extinct genus of dinosaurs

Thespesius (meaning "wondrous one") is a dubious genus of hadrosaurid dinosaur from the late Maastrichtian-age Upper Cretaceous Lance Formation of South Dakota.

== History ==
In 1855 geologist Ferdinand Vandeveer Hayden sent a number of fossils to paleontologist Joseph Leidy in Philadelphia. Hayden had collected them from the surface of a rock formation then known as the Great Lignite Formation (now recognized as part of the Lance Formation) in the Nebraska Territory, near the Grand River (present-day South Dakota). Among them were two caudal vertebrae and a phalanx. In 1856 Leidy named the type species Thespesius occidentalis for these three bones. The generic name is derived from Greek θεσπεσιος, thespesios, "wondrous", because of the colossal size of the remains. Leidy avoided using the suffix "saurus" in the genus name because Vandeveer Hayden had claimed the bones came from a layer from the Miocene so there was a chance that the animal would turn out to be a mammal, though Leidy himself was convinced it was a dinosaurian. The specific name means "western" in Latin.

The caudal vertebrae, USNM 219 and USNM 221, and the middle toe phalanx, USNM 220, form the original syntype series.

== Classification ==
Like Trachodon, another duckbill genus named by Joseph Leidy, Thespesius is a historically-important genus with a convoluted taxonomy that has been all but abandoned by modern dinosaur paleontologists. Around 1900 the name was used by some authors to indicate all late Maastrichtian hadrosaurids in North America. In 1875, E.D. Cope stated that he considered Agathaumas milo, known from partial limb bones and some vertebrae, to be a synonym of T. occidentalis (which he considered a species of Hadrosaurus at the time). In 1900, a short piece published in Science by F.A. Lucas noted that Leidy's original Thespesius occidentalis fossils were indistinguishable from more complete specimens which had been referred in the late 1800s to the species Claosaurus annectens. Therefore, Lucas argued, the name T. occidentalis should be used for this animal.

Lucas' opinion was supported by Charles W. Gilmore in a 1915 paper for Science re-evaluating the use of the genus Trachodon. A wide variety of hadrosaurid species had been classified as Trachodon or "trachodonts", most notably the large "duck-billed" specimens collected by E.D. Cope and mounted in the American Museum of Natural History. Gilmore noted that the holotype fossils of T. occidentalis were "inadequate", but that geologic work showed that they undoubtedly came from the same fossil beds as Claosaurus annectens, and that therefore the older name (T. occidentalis) should be used for the Lance-aged "trachodonts." Many later researchers, including L.S. Russell and Charles M. Sternberg, continued to use the names Thespesius occidentalis or Thespesius annectens for the Lance hadrosaurids through the 1920s and 1930s.

However, as early as 1913, paleontologist Lawrence Lambe regarded the type fossils of Thespesius occidentalis as inadequate and that any inferences based on them were too conjectural, as was the case for Trachodon. In an influential 1942 paper on hadrosaurids by Richard S. Lull and Nelda E. Wright, the authors classified most specimens of Thespesius annectens in the new genus Anatosaurus, and referred Cope's giant "duck-billed" specimens to Anatosaurus copei. Though they noted that T. occidentalis could possibly be distinguished from Anatosaurus based on its shorter tail vertebrae, they ultimately agreed with Lambe that, despite its historical importance, Thespesius occidentalis was too incomplete for good comparison. It has been generally ignored as a nomen dubium ever since.

A referred species of Thespesius, T. saskatchewanensis, was named by Sternberg in 1926, but Nicolás Campione and David Evans found that it was a synonym of Edmontosaurus annectens in a 2011 study of edmontosaur diversity. Campione and Evans also found Thespesius edmontoni, named by Gilmore in 1924, to be a synonym of Edmontosaurus regalis.

== See also ==
- Timeline of hadrosaur research
