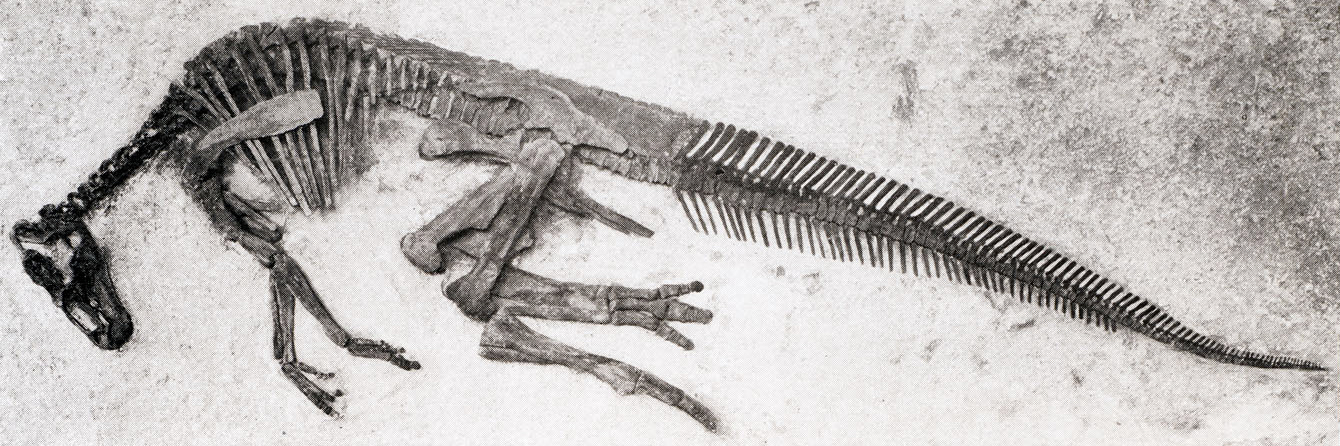
- Holotype skeleton of Thespesius edmontoni, now thought to be a young E. regalis

Scientific classification
- Kingdom: Animalia
- Phylum: Chordata
- Class: Reptilia
- Clade: Dinosauria
- Clade: †Ornithischia
- Clade: †Ornithopoda
- Family: †Hadrosauridae
- Subfamily: †Saurolophinae
- Genus: †Edmontosaurus
- Species: †E. regalis

Binomial name
- †Edmontosaurus regalis Lambe, 1917

Synonyms
- Trachodon avatus Cope, 1871; Thespesius edmontoni Gilmore, 1924; Anatosaurus edmontoni (Gilmore, 1924) Lull & Wright, 1942; Edmontosaurus edmontoni (Gilmore, 1924) Russell and Chamney, 1967; Thespesius edmontonensis Gilmore, 1924 emend Olshevsky, 1991

= Edmontosaurus regalis =

Edmontosaurus regalis Temporal range: Late Cretaceous, 73–70 Ma

Extinct species of dinosaur

Edmontosaurus regalis is a species of comb-crested hadrosaurid dinosaur. Fossils of E. regalis have been found in rocks of western North America that date from the late Campanian age of the Cretaceous Period 73 million years ago, but it may have possibly lived into the early Maastrichtian.

E. regalis was one of the largest hadrosaurids, measuring up to 12 metres (39 ft) long and weighing around 4.0 metric tons (4.4 short tons). It is classified as a genus of saurolophine (or hadrosaurine) hadrosaurid, a member of the group of hadrosaurids that lacked large, hollow crests, and instead had smaller, solid crests or fleshy combs. The distribution of E. regalis fossils suggests that it preferred coasts and coastal plains. It was a herbivore that could move on both two legs and four. Because it is known from several bone beds, E. regalis is thought to have lived in large groups. The wealth of fossils has allowed researchers to study its paleobiology in detail, including its brain, how it may have fed, and its injuries and pathologies.

== Description ==
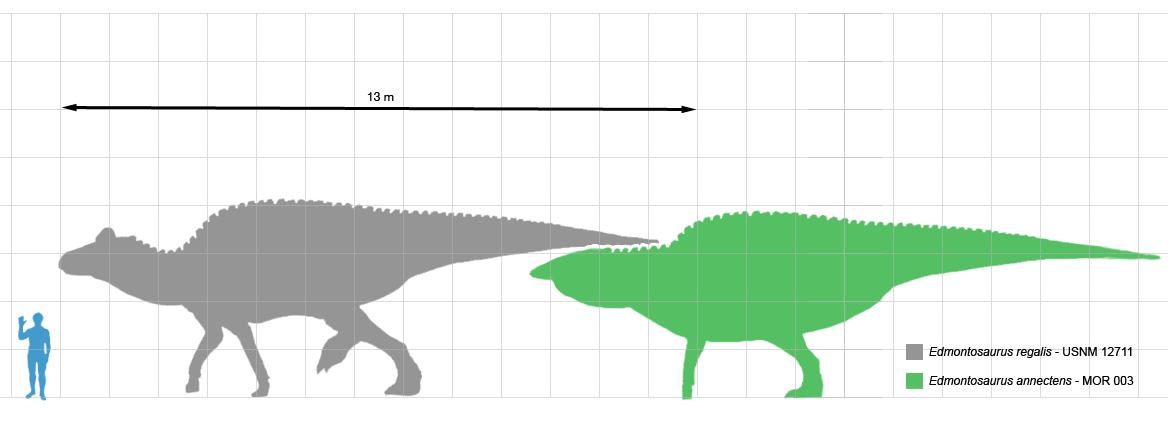
Scale diagram comparing E. regalis and E. annectens to a human

Edmontosaurus regalis is known from several fossil specimens. E. regalis was among the largest of hadrosaurids, as a fully grown adult could have been 9 metres (30 ft) long. Some of the larger specimens reached the range of 12 metres (39 ft) to 13 metres (43 ft) long. Its weight was on the order of 4.0 metric tons (4.4 short tons). The type specimen of E. regalis, NMC 2288, is estimated as 9 to 12 metres (30 to 39 ft) long. A 2022 study proposed that E. regalis may have been heavier than its generic relative, E. annectens, but not enough samples exist to provide a valid estimate and examination on its osteohistology and growth, so the results for E. regalis aren't statistically significant.

The skull was roughly triangular in profile. One specimen preserved a soft tissue crest or wattle on top of its head. The beak was toothless, with both the upper and lower beaks being extended by keratinous material. Its teeth were present only in the maxillae (upper cheeks) and dentaries (main bone of the lower jaw). They grew in columns, with an observed maximum of six in each and the number of columns varied based on the animal's size. There were 51 to 53 columns per maxilla and 48 to 49 per dentary (teeth of the upper jaw being slightly narrower than those in the lower jaw).

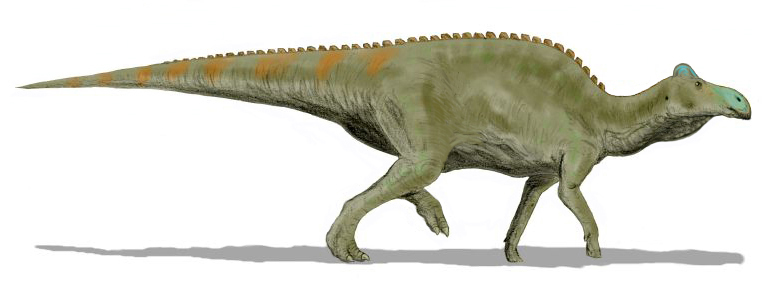
Life restoration

E. regalis had thirteen neck vertebrae, eighteen back vertebrae, nine hip vertebrae, and an unknown number of tail vertebrae. The front legs were shorter and less heavily built than the back legs. Each hand had four fingers, but no thumb (first finger). The second, third, and fourth fingers were approximately the same length and unified in life within a fleshy covering. Although the second and third finger had hoof-like claws, these bones were also within the skin and not apparent from the outside. The little finger was separate from the other three and was much shorter. Each foot had three toes, with no big toe or little toe. The toes had keratinous hoof-like tips.

== Discovery and history ==
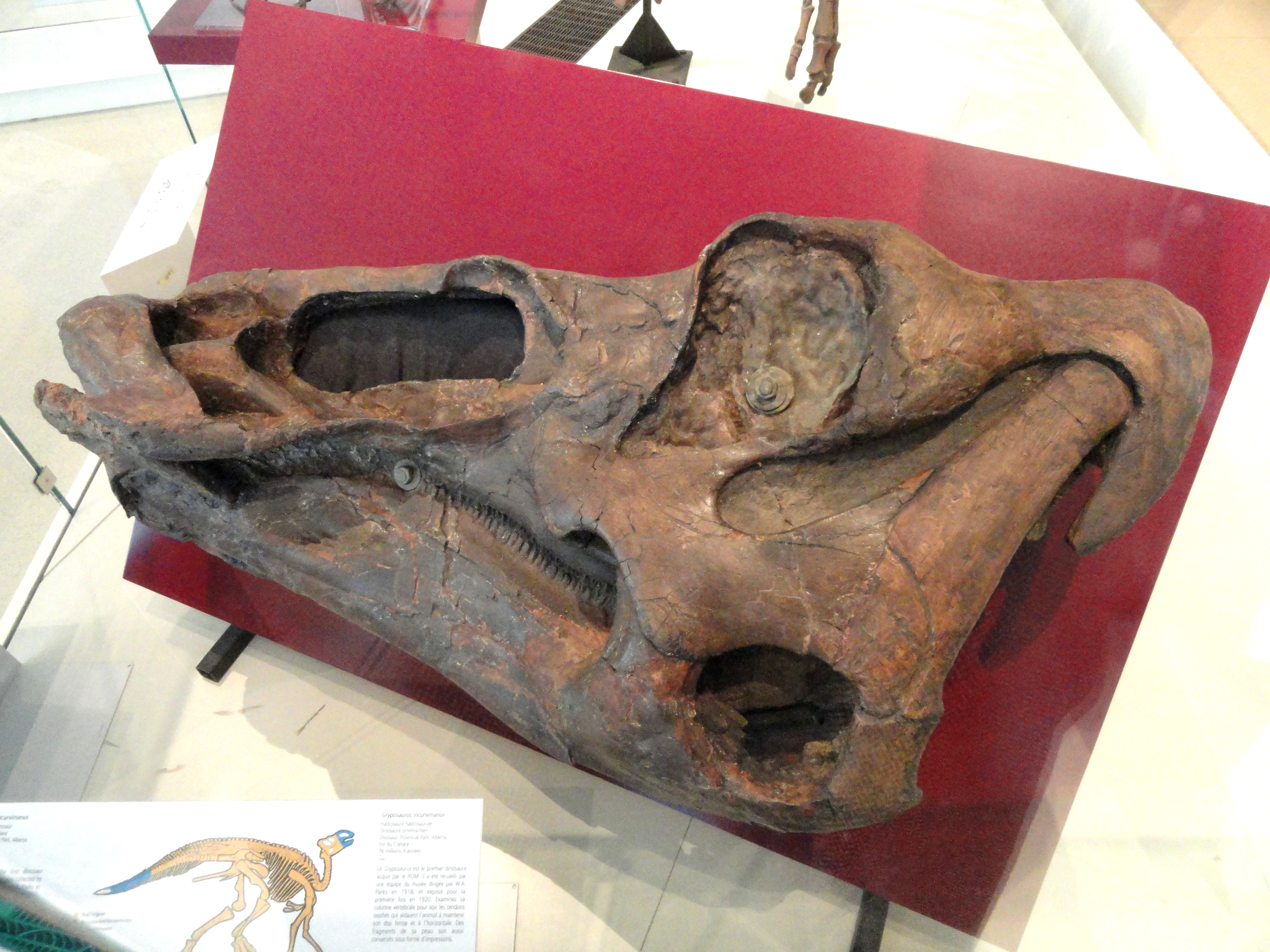
Fossil skull ROM 801

The first known fossil remains that may belong to Edmontosaurus regalis were named Trachodon cavatus in 1871 by Edward Drinker Cope. The name is spelled in more recent sources as Trachodon avatus or as Trachodon atavus. This species was assessed without comment as a synonym of Edmontosaurus regalis in two reviews, although T. atavus predates E. regalis by several decades. In 1874, Cope named (but did not describe) Agathaumas milo for a sacral vertebra and shin fragments from the late Maastrichtian-age Upper Cretaceous Laramie Formation of Colorado. Later that same year, he described these bones under the name Hadrosaurus occidentalis. Sadly, the bones are now lost to history. As with Trachodon atavus, Agathaumas milo has been assigned without comment to Edmontosaurus regalis in two reviews, although predating E. regalis by several decades. Neither species has attracted much attention, as both are absent from Lull and Wright's 1942 monograph, for example. A third and obscure early species, Trachodon selwyni, described by Lawrence Lambe in 1902 for a lower jaw from what is now known as the Dinosaur Park Formation of Alberta, was erroneously described by Glut (1997) as having been assigned to Edmontosaurus regalis by Lull and Wright. It was not, instead being designated "of very doubtful validity." More recent reviews of hadrosaurids have concurred.

The type specimen of E. regalis is NMC 2288, which consists of a skull, articulated vertebrae up to the sixth tail vertebra, ribs, partial hips, an upper arm bone, and most of a hind limb. It was discovered in 1912 by Levi Sternberg. The second specimen, paratype NMC 2289, consists of a skull and skeleton lacking the beak, most of the tail, and part of the feet. It was discovered in 1916 by George F. Sternberg. Both skeletons were found in the Horseshoe Canyon Formation (formerly the lower Edmonton Formation) along the Red Deer River of southern Alberta. Thus, the Edmonton Formation lent Edmontosaurus its name. The name Edmontosaurus regalis (meaning "regal," or, more loosely, "king-sized"), was coined in 1917 by Lawrence Lambe. Lambe found that his new dinosaur compared best to specimens of "Diclonius mirabilis" (now assigned to Edmontosaurus annectens) and drew attention to the size and robustness of Edmontosaurus regalis. Initially, Lambe only described the skulls of the two skeletons, but returned to the genus in 1920 to describe the skeleton of NMC 2289. The postcrania of the type specimen remains undescribed, still in its plaster jackets.

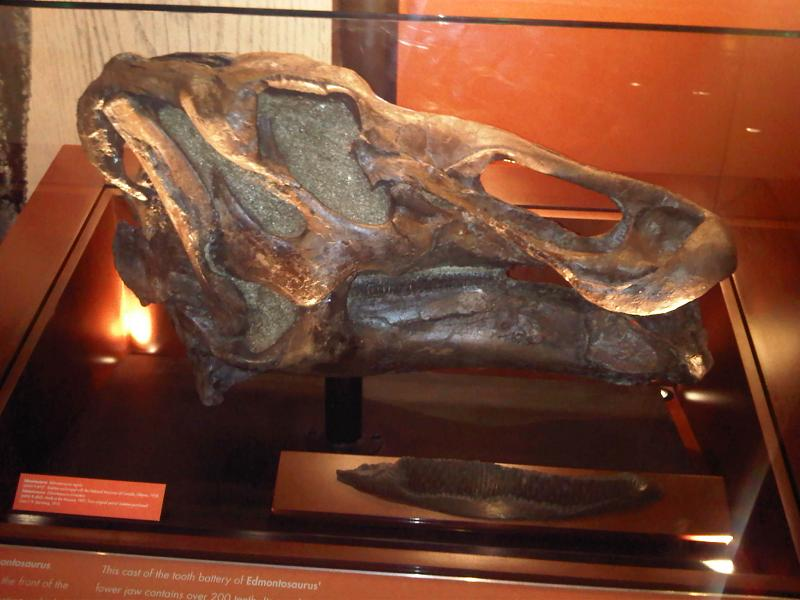
Skull NHM R8927 at the Natural History Museum

Two more species that would come to be included with Edmontosaurus regalis were named from Canadian remains in the 1920s, but both would initially be assigned to the dubious genus Thespesius. Gilmore named the first, Thespesius edmontoni, in 1924. T. edmontoni also came from the Horseshoe Canyon Formation. It was based on NMC 8399, another nearly complete skeleton lacking most of the tail. NMC 8399 was discovered on the Red Deer River in 1912 by a Sternberg party. Its forelimbs, ossified tendons, and skin impressions were briefly described in 1913 and 1914 by Lambe, who at first thought it was an example of a species he'd named Trachodon marginatus, but he changed his mind. The specimen became the first dinosaur skeleton to be mounted for exhibition in a Canadian museum. Gilmore found that his new species compared closely to what he called Thespesius annectens, but left the two apart because of details of the arms and hands. He also noted that his species had more vertebrae than Marsh's in the back and neck, but proposed that Marsh was mistaken in assuming that the annectens specimens were complete in those regions.

In 1926, Charles Mortram Sternberg named Thespesius saskatchewanensis for NMC 8509, which is a skull and partial skeleton from the Wood Mountain plateau of southern Saskatchewan. He had collected this specimen in 1921 from rocks that were assigned to the Lance Formation, now the Frenchman Formation. NMC 8509 included an almost complete skull, numerous vertebrae, partial shoulder and hip girdles, and partial legs. This represented the first substantial dinosaur specimen recovered from Saskatchewan. Sternberg opted to assign it to Thespesius because that was the only hadrosaurid genus known from the Lance Formation at the time. T. saskatchewanensis was unusual because of its small size, estimated at 7 to 7.3 metres (23 to 24 ft) in length.

== Classification ==
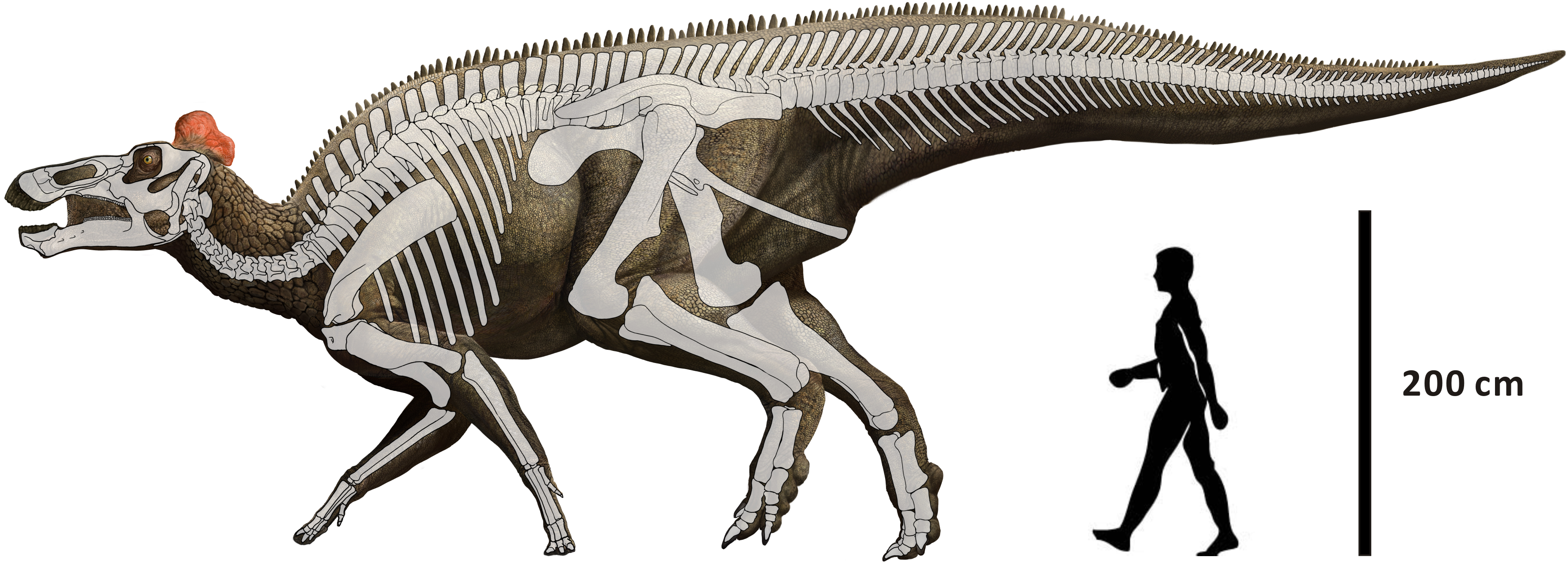
Reconstruction of E. regalis

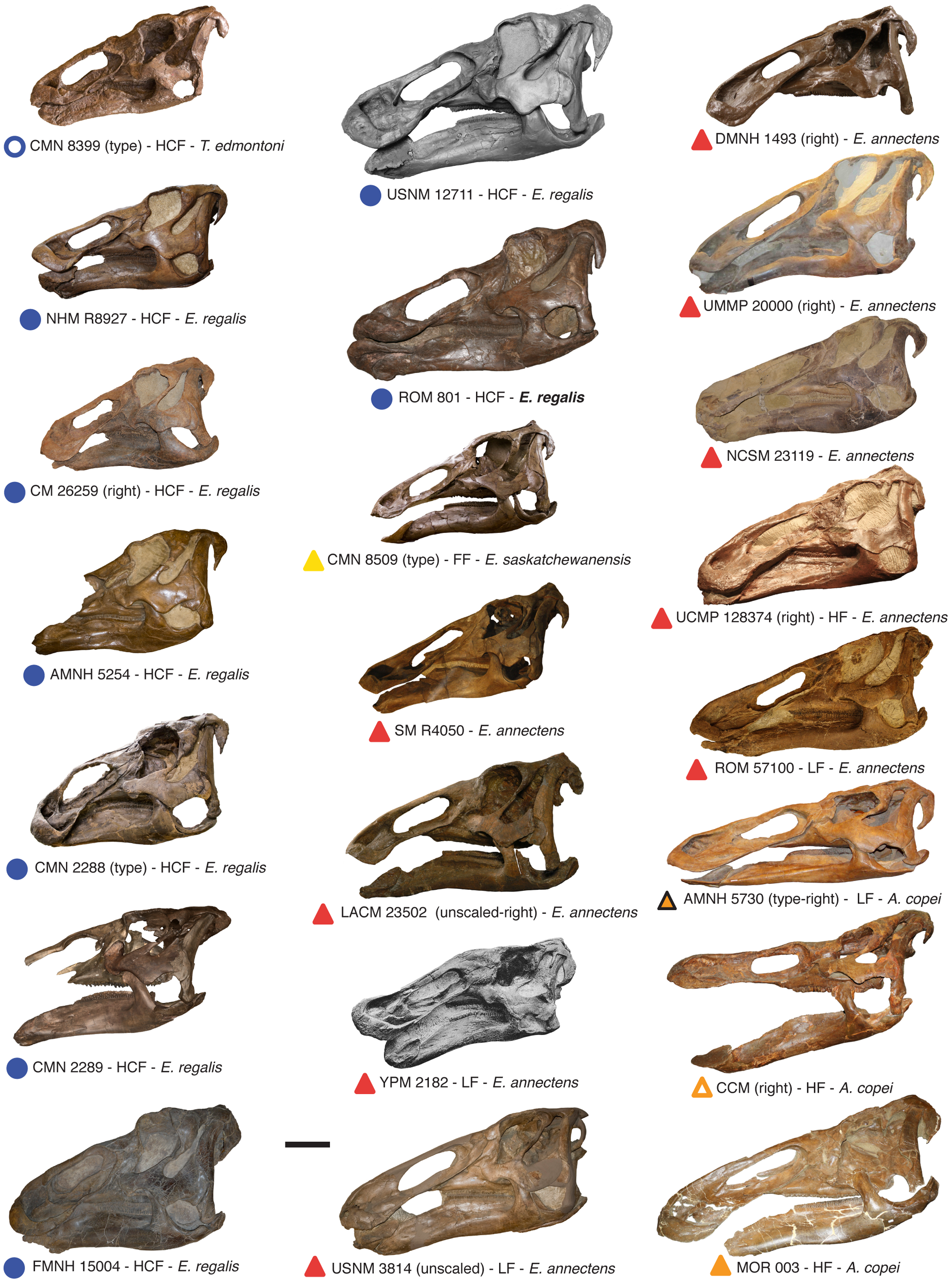
Most known complete Edmontosaurus skulls (E. regalis from left to upper middle)

The cladogram below follows an analysis from Godefroit et al. (2012).

- - Bactrosaurus
  - Hadrosauridae
    - Hadrosaurinae
      - Hadrosaurus
      - Lophorhothon
    - Saurolophidae
      - Lambeosaurinae
      - Saurolophinae
        - Wulagasaurus
        - - Brachylophosaurini
            - Acristavus
            - - Maiasaura
              - Brachylophosaurus
          - - Kritosaurus
            - - - Gryposaurus latidens
                - - Gryposaurus notabilis
                  - Gryposaurus monumentensis
              - - Saurolophini
                  - Prosaurolophus
                  - - Saurolophus angustirostris
                    - Saurolophus osborni
                - Edmontosaurini
                  - - Kerberosaurus
                    - Kundurosaurus
                  - - Edmontosaurus annectens
                    - Edmontosaurus regalis

== Paleobiology ==
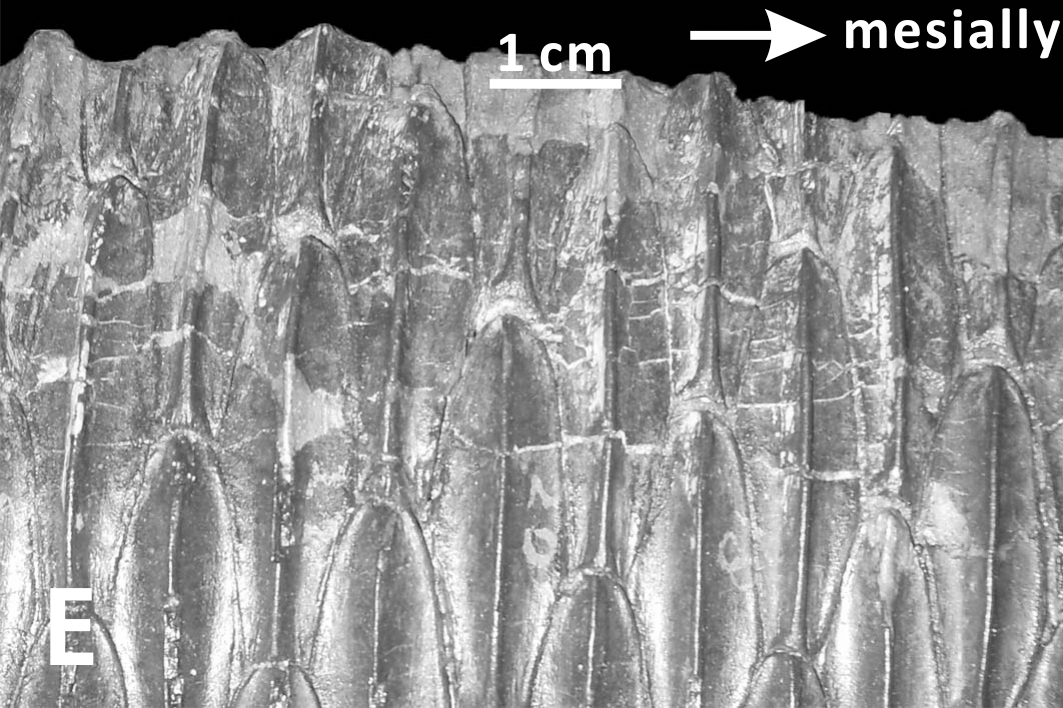
Close up of tooth crowns

In a 2011 study, Campione and Evans recorded data from all known edmontosaur skulls and used it to plot a morphometric graph, comparing variable features of the skull with skull size. Their results showed that within Edmontosaurus regalis, many features previously used to classify additional species were directly correlated with skull size. Campione and Evans interpreted these results as strongly suggesting that the shape of E. regalis skulls changed dramatically as they grew. This has led to several apparent mistakes in past classification. The Campanian species Thespesius edmontoni, previously considered a synonym of E. annectens because of its small size and skull shape, is more likely a subadult specimen of E. regalis. In a 2014 study, researchers proposed that E. regalis reached maturity at 10-15 years of age. A preserved rhamphotheca present in specimen LACM 23502, housed in the Los Angeles County Museum, also indicates the beak of the related Edmontosaurus annectens was more hook-shaped and extensive than many illustrations in scientific and public media have previously depicted. Whether this was true of E. regalis as well is still unknown as of this time.

Extensive bone beds are known for Edmontosaurus regalis and such groupings of hadrosaurids are used to suggest that they were gregarious, living in herds. Two quarries containing E. regalis remains were identified in a 2007 database of fossil bone beds, including ones in Alaska (Prince Creek Formation) and Alberta (Horseshoe Canyon Formation).

== Paleoecology ==
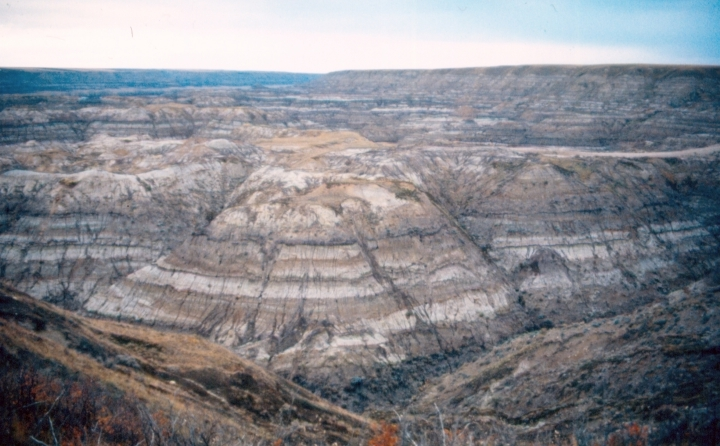
Horseshoe Canyon Formation near Drumheller. The dark bands are coal seams.

The Edmontonian land vertebrate age is defined by the first appearance of Edmontosaurus regalis in the fossil record. Although sometimes reported as of exclusively the early Maastrichtian age, the Horseshoe Canyon Formation was of somewhat longer duration. Deposition began approximately 73 million years ago, in the late Campanian, and ended between 68.0 and 67.6 million years ago. Edmontosaurus regalis is known from the lowest of five units within the Horseshoe Canyon Formation, but is absent from at least the second to the top.

Because of its wide distribution, which covers a distance from Alaska to Colorado and includes polar settings that would have had little light during a significant part of the year, Edmontosaurus regalis has been considered possibly migratory. A 2008 review of dinosaur migration studies by Phil R. Bell and Eric Snively proposed that E. regalis was capable of an annual 2,600 kilometres (1,600 mi) round-trip journey, provided it had the requisite metabolism and fat deposition rates. Such a trip would have required walking speeds of about 2 to 10 kilometres per hour (1 to 6 mph) and could have brought it from Alaska to Alberta. The possible migratory nature of E. regalis contrasts with many other dinosaurs, such as theropods, sauropods, and ankylosaurians, which Bell and Snively found were more likely to have overwintered. In contrast to Bell and Snively, Anusuya Chinsamy and colleagues concluded from a study of bone microstructure that polar edmontosaurs overwintered.

=== Contemporary fauna ===
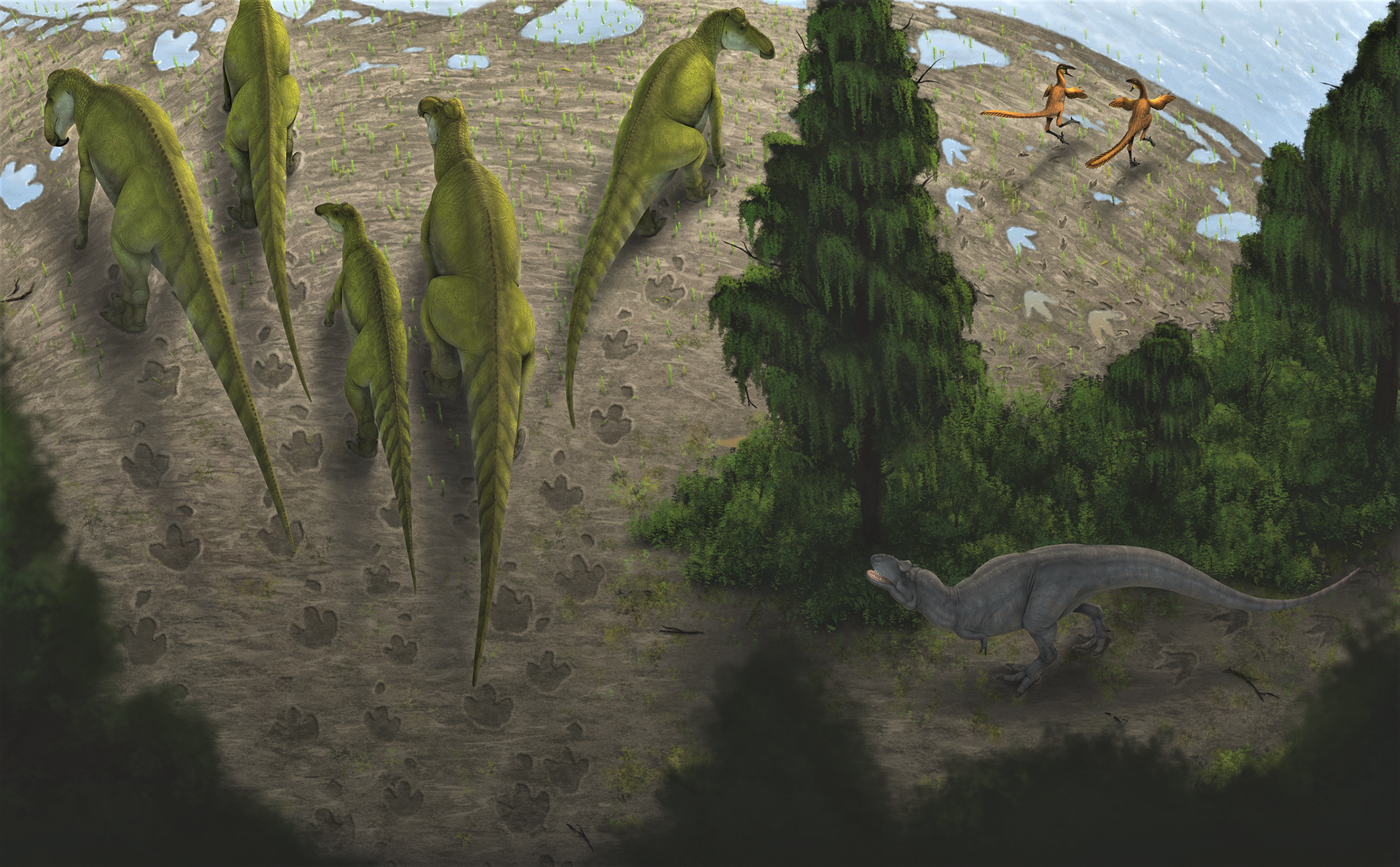
Reconstruction of the Tyrants Aisle tracksite, featuring an E. regalis herd and contemporary paleofauna

As many as three quarters of the dinosaur specimens from the badlands near Drumheller may pertain to Edmontosaurus regalis. The Horseshoe Canyon Formation is interpreted as having a significant marine influence, due to the encroaching Western Interior Seaway. This shallow sea stretched from the Gulf of Mexico to the Arctic Ocean, covering the midsection of North America through much of the Cretaceous. E. regalis shared this setting with fellow hadrosaurids Hypacrosaurus and Saurolophus, the parksosaurid Parksosaurus, the ceratopsids Montanoceratops, Anchiceratops, Arrhinoceratops, and Pachyrhinosaurus, the pachycephalosaurid Stegoceras, the ankylosaurid Euoplocephalus, the nodosaurid Edmontonia, the ornithomimids Ornithomimus and Struthiomimus, a variety of poorly known small theropods that included troodontids and dromaeosaurids, and the tyrannosaurid Albertosaurus.

Edmontosaurus is found in coastal, near-marine settings, while Hypacrosaurus and Saurolophus are found in more continental lowlands. Edmontosaurus and Saurolophus are not usually found together. The typical edmontosaur habitat of this formation has been described as the back regions of bald cypress swamps and peat bogs on delta coasts. Pachyrhinosaurus also preferred this habitat to the floodplains dominated by Hypacrosaurus, Saurolophus, Anchiceratops, and Arrhinoceratops. The Edmontonian-age coastal Pachyrhinosaurus-Edmontosaurus association is recognized as far north as Alaska.

== See also ==
- Timeline of hadrosaur research
- Edmontosaurus annectens
