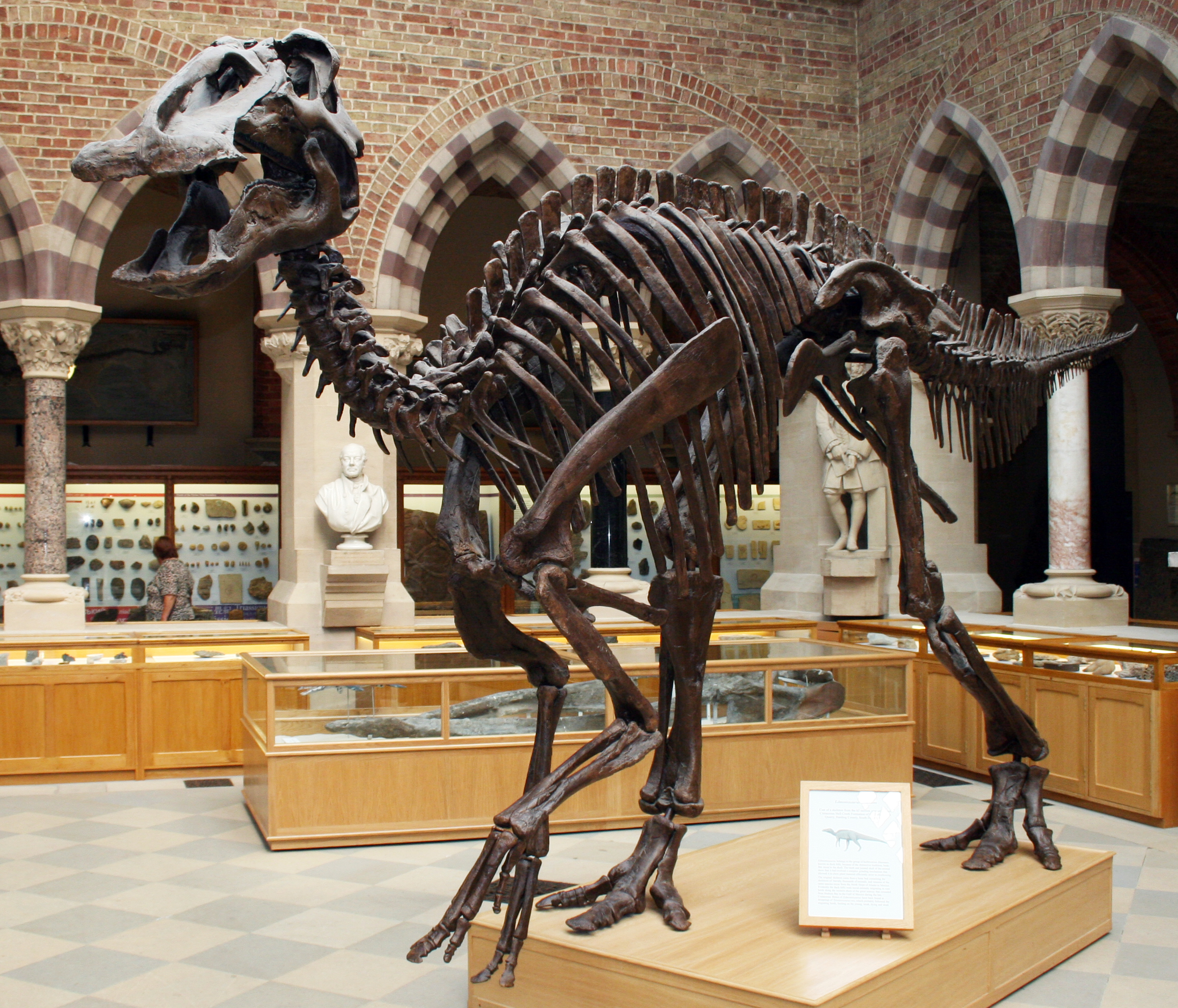
- Mounted cast of a fossil E. annectens skeleton, Oxford University Museum of Natural History

Scientific classification
- Kingdom: Animalia
- Phylum: Chordata
- Class: Reptilia
- Clade: Dinosauria
- Clade: †Ornithischia
- Clade: †Ornithopoda
- Family: †Hadrosauridae
- Subfamily: †Saurolophinae
- Genus: †Edmontosaurus
- Species: †E. annectens

Binomial name
- †Edmontosaurus annectens (Marsh, 1892)

Synonyms
- List: Trachodon longiceps Marsh, 1890; Hadrosaurus longiceps (Marsh, 1890) Nopcsa, 1900; Claosaurus annectens Marsh, 1892; Trachodon annectens (Marsh, 1892) Hay, 1902; Thespesius annectens (Marsh, 1892) Sternberg, 1925; Thespesius saskatchewanensis Sternberg, 1926; Trachodon saskatchewanensis (Sternberg, 1926) Kuhn, 1936; Thespesius longiceps (Marsh, 1890) Russell, 1930; Anatosaurus annectens (Marsh, 1892) Lull & Wright, 1942; Anatosaurus longiceps (Marsh, 1890) Lull & Wright, 1942; Anatosaurus saskatchewanensis (Sternberg, 1926) Lull & Wright, 1942; Anatosaurus copei Lull & Wright, 1942; Edmontosaurus copei (Lull & Wright, 1942) Brett-Surman, 1975; Anatotitan copei (Lull & Wright, 1942) Brett-Surman vide Chapman & Brett-Surman, 1990; Anatotitan longiceps (Marsh, 1890) Olshevsky, 1991; Edmontosaurus saskatchewanensis (Sternberg, 1926) Horner, Weishampel & Forster, 2004

= Edmontosaurus annectens =

Edmontosaurus annectens Temporal range: Late Cretaceous (Maastrichtian), 68–66 Ma

Hadrosaurid species from the Late Cretaceous Period

Edmontosaurus annectens (meaning "connected lizard from Edmonton"), often colloquially and historically known as Anatosaurus (meaning "duck lizard"), is a species of flat-headed saurolophine hadrosaurid dinosaur from the late Maastrichtian age at the very end of the Cretaceous period, in what is now western North America. Remains of E. annectens have been preserved in the Frenchman, Hell Creek, and Lance Formations. All of these formations are dated to the late Maastrichtian age of the Late Cretaceous period, which represents the last three million years before the extinction of the non-avian dinosaurs (between 68 and 66 million years ago). E. annectens is also found in the Laramie Formation, and magnetostratigraphy suggests an age of 69–68 Ma for the Laramie Formation.

Edmontosaurus annectens is known from numerous specimens, including at least twenty partial-to-complete skulls, discovered in the U.S. states of Montana, South Dakota, North Dakota, Wyoming, and Colorado, as well as the Canadian province of Saskatchewan. It had an extremely long and low skull, and was quite a large animal, growing up to approximately 12 metres (39 ft) in length and 5.6 metric tons (6.2 short tons) in average asymptotic body mass, although it could have been even larger. E. annectens exhibits one of the most striking examples of the "duckbill" snout that is common to hadrosaurs. It has a long taxonomic history, and specimens have at times been classified as Diclonius, Trachodon, Hadrosaurus, Claosaurus, Thespesius, Anatosaurus, and Anatotitan before all being grouped together in Edmontosaurus.

== Discovery and history ==
E. annectens has a complicated taxonomic history, with various specimens having been classified in a variety of genera. Its history involves Anatosaurus, Anatotitan, Claosaurus, Diclonius, Hadrosaurus, Thespesius, and Trachodon, as well as Edmontosaurus. References predating the 1980s typically use Anatosaurus, Claosaurus, Diclonius, Thespesius, or Trachodon for E. annectens fossils, depending on the author and date.

=== Cope's Diclonius mirabilis ===
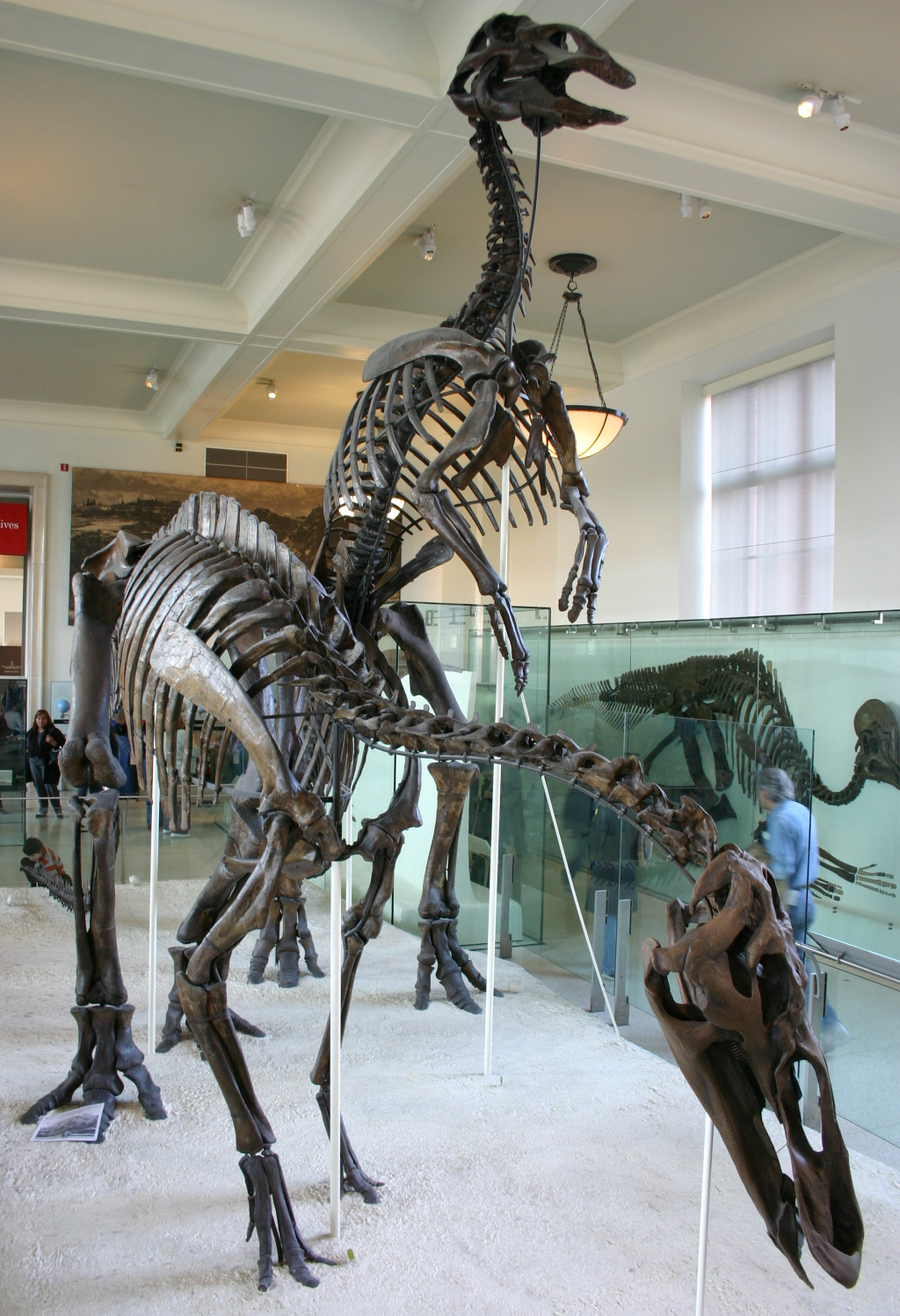
Skeletons (AMNH 5730, left, and AMNH 5886, right), first mounted in the American Museum of Natural History in 1908

The history of E. annectens predates the naming of both the genus Edmontosaurus and the species annectens. The first quality specimen, the former holotype of Anatosaurus copei (Anatotitan), was a complete skull and most of a skeleton collected in 1882 by Dr. J. L. Wortman and R. S. Hill for American paleontologist Edward Drinker Cope. This specimen, found in Hell Creek Formation rocks, came from northeast of the Black Hills of South Dakota, and originally had extensive skin impressions. It was missing most of its pelvis and part of its torso due to a stream cutting through it. The bill had impressions of a horn-like sheath with a tooth-like series of interlocking points on the upper and lower jaws. When describing this specimen, AMNH 5730, Cope assigned it to the species Diclonius mirabilis. This species name was created by combining Diclonius, a hadrosaurid genus Cope had named earlier from teeth, with Trachodon mirabilis, an older name based on teeth that was published by Joseph Leidy. Cope believed that Leidy had failed to properly characterize the genus Trachodon and later abandoned its use, so he assigned the old species to his newer genus. Leidy had come to recognize that his Trachodon was based on the remains of multiple kinds of dinosaurs, and although he had made some attempts to revise the genus, he had not yet made any formal declaration of his intentions.

Cope's description promoted hadrosaurids as amphibious animals, contributing to this long-time image. His reasoning was that the teeth of the lower jaw were weakly connected to the bone, and liable to break off if used to eat terrestrial food; he described the beak as weak, too. However, aside from misidentifying several of the skull bones, by chance, the lower jaws were missing the walls supporting the teeth from the inside, and the teeth were actually very well-supported. Cope intended to describe the skeleton and skull, but his promised paper never appeared. It was purchased for the American Museum of Natural History in 1899, where it acquired its present designation: AMNH 5730.

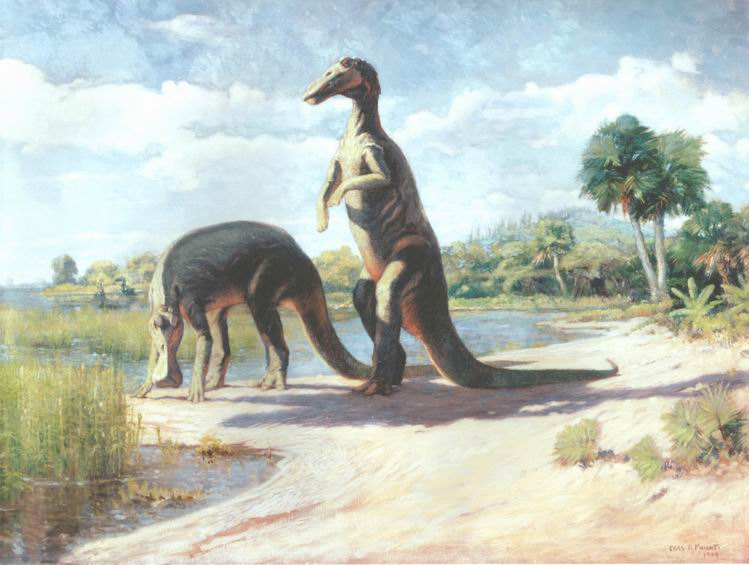
Outdated 1909 life restoration of Trachodon by Charles R. Knight, based on the two specimens (now classified as E. annectens) mounted in 1908 at the AMNH, New York.

Several years after Cope's description, his arch-rival, Othniel Charles Marsh, published a paper on a sizable lower jaw recovered by John Bell Hatcher in 1889 from the Lance Formation rocks in Niobrara County, Wyoming. Marsh named this partial jaw Trachodon longiceps, and it is cataloged as YPM 616. As noted by Lull and Wright, this long, slender partial jaw shares with Cope's specimen a prominent ridge running on its side. However, it is much larger: Cope's specimen had a dentary that is 92.0 centimetres (36.2 in) long, whereas Marsh's dentary is estimated at 110.0 centimetres (43.3 in) long.

A second mostly complete skeleton, AMNH 5886, was found in 1904 in the Hell Creek Formation rocks at Crooked Creek in central Montana by a local rancher named Oscar Hunter. Upon finding the partially exposed specimen, he and a companion argued about whether or not the remains were recent or fossil. Hunter demonstrated that they were brittle and thus stone by kicking the tops off the vertebrae, an act later lamented by the eventual collector Barnum Brown. Another cowboy, Alfred Sensiba, bought the specimen from Hunter for a pistol and later sold it to Brown, who excavated it for the American Museum of Natural History in 1906. This specimen had a nearly complete vertebral column, permitting the restoration of Cope's specimen. In 1908, these two specimens were mounted side by side in the American Museum of Natural History under the name Trachodon mirabilis. Cope's specimen is positioned on all fours with its head down, as if feeding, because it has the better skull, while Brown's specimen, with a less perfect skull, is posed bipedally with the head less accessible. Henry Fairfield Osborn described the tableau as representing the two animals feeding alongside a marsh, the standing individual having been startled by the approach of a Tyrannosaurus. Impressions of appropriate plant remains and shells based on associated fossils were included on the base of the group, including ginkgo leaves, Sequoia cones, and horsetail rushes.

=== Marsh's Claosaurus annectens ===
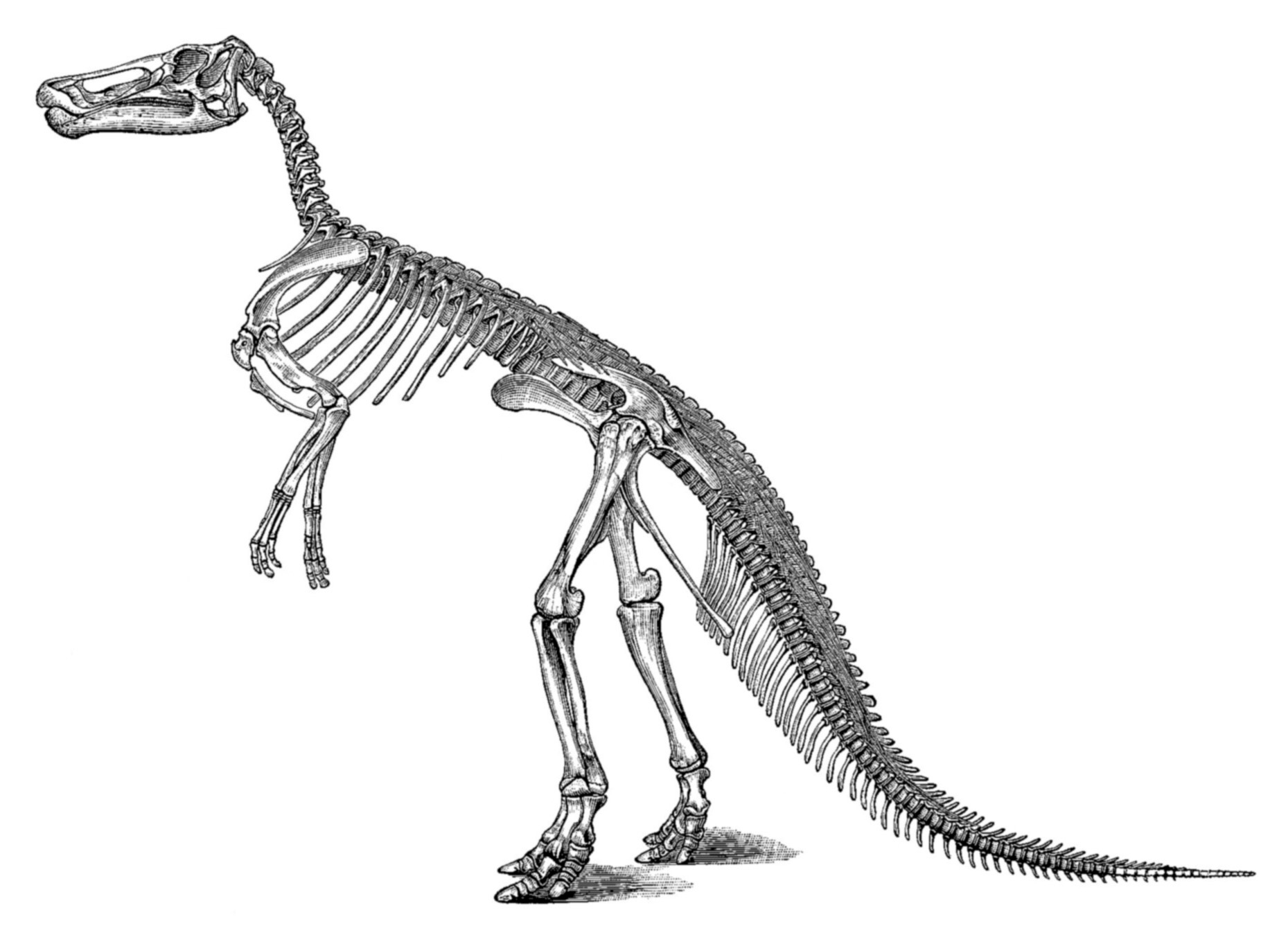
Skeletal restoration of the E. annectens (then Claosaurus) holotype, by Othniel Charles Marsh.

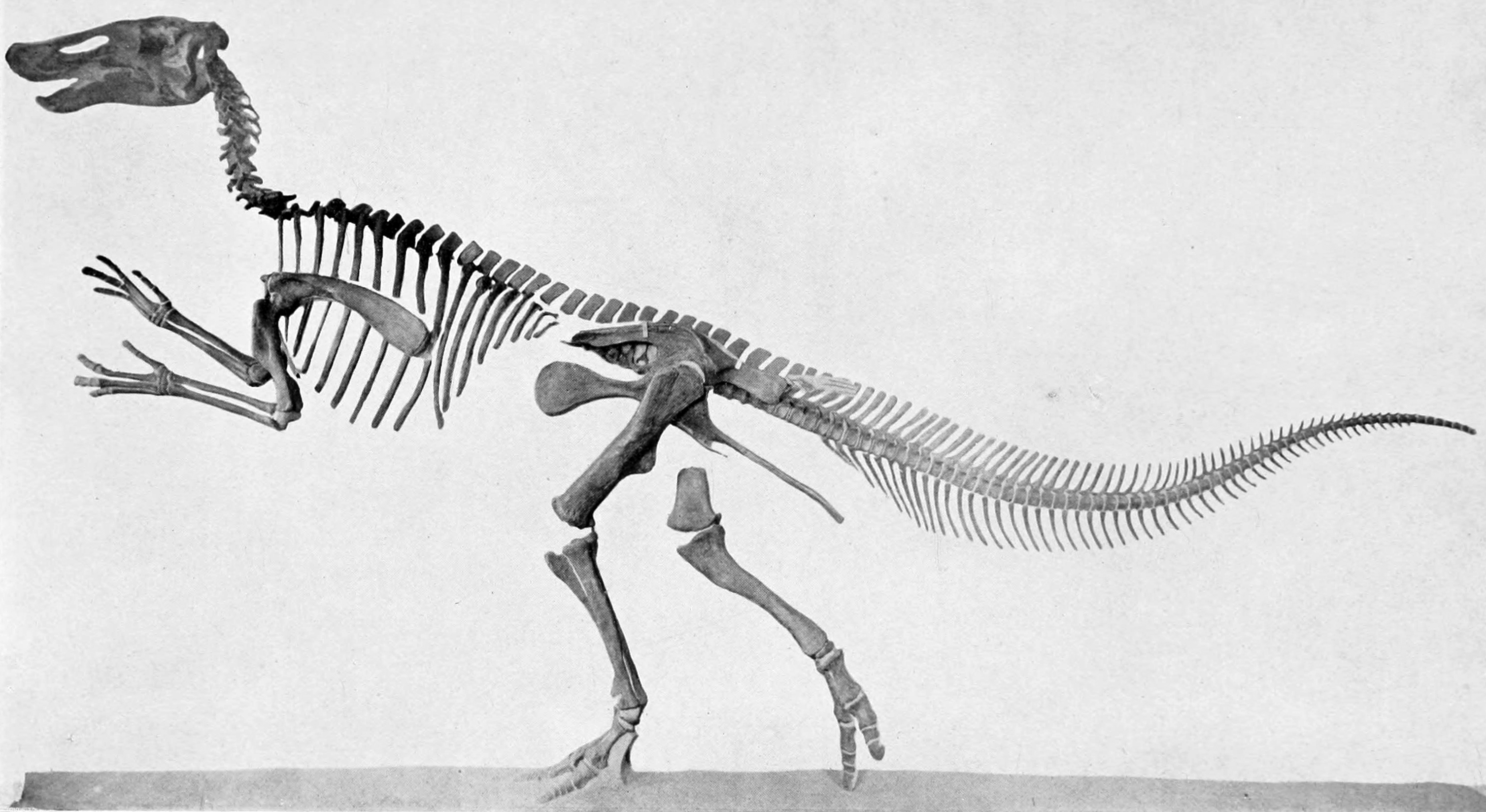
E. annectens paratype YPM 2182 at the Yale University Museum, the first nearly complete dinosaur skeleton mounted in the United States.

The species now known as Edmontosaurus annectens was named in 1892 as Claosaurus annectens by Othniel Charles Marsh. This species is based on USNM 2414, a partial skull-roof and skeleton, with a second skull and skeleton, YPM 2182, being designated as the paratype. Both were collected in 1891 by John Bell Hatcher, from the late Maastrichtian-age Upper Cretaceous Lance Formation of Niobrara County (then part of Converse County), Wyoming. This species has some historical footnotes attached, as it is among the first dinosaurs to receive a skeletal restoration, and is the first hadrosaurid so restored. YPM 2182 and UNSM 2414 are, respectively, the first and second essentially complete mounted dinosaur skeletons in the United States. YPM 2182 was put on display in 1901, and USNM 2414 was put on display in 1904.

In the first decade of the twentieth century, two additional important specimens of C. annectens were recovered. The first, the "Trachodon mummy," AMNH 5060, was discovered in 1908 by Charles Hazelius Sternberg and his sons in the Lance Formation rocks near Lusk, Wyoming. Sternberg was working for the British Museum of Natural History, but Henry Fairfield Osborn of the American Museum of Natural History was able to purchase the specimen for $2,000. The Sternbergs recovered a second similar specimen from the same area in 1910. It was not as well-preserved, but also found with skin impressions. They sold this specimen, SM 4036, to the Senckenberg Museum in Germany.

=== Canadian discoveries ===
Edmontosaurus itself was coined in 1917 by Lawrence Lambe for two partial skeletons found in the Horseshoe Canyon Formation (formerly the lower Edmonton Formation), along the Red Deer River of southern Alberta. The Horseshoe Canyon Formation is older than the rocks in which Claosaurus annectens was found. Lambe found that his new dinosaur compared best to Cope's Diclonius mirabilis.

In 1926, Charles Mortram Sternberg named Thespesius saskatchewanensis for NMC 8509, a skull and partial skeleton from the Wood Mountain plateau of southern Saskatchewan. He had collected this specimen in 1921 from rocks that were assigned to the Lance Formation, now the Frenchman Formation. NMC 8509 included an almost complete skull, numerous vertebrae, partial shoulder and hip girdles, and partial back legs, representing the first substantial dinosaur specimen recovered from Saskatchewan. Sternberg opted to assign it to Thespesius because that was the only hadrosaurid genus known from the Lance Formation at the time. At the time, T. saskatchewanensis was unusual because of its small size, estimated at 7 to 7.3 meters (23 to 24 ft) in length.

=== Early classifications ===
Because of the incomplete understanding of hadrosaurids at the time, following Marsh's death in 1899, Claosaurus annectens was variously classified as a species of Claosaurus, Thespesius, or Trachodon. Opinions varied greatly, with textbooks and encyclopedias drawing a distinction between the "Iguanodon-like" Claosaurus annectens and the "duck-billed" Hadrosaurus (based on Cope's Diclonius mirabilis); conversely, Hatcher explicitly identified C. annectens as synonymous with the hadrosaurid represented by those same duck-billed skulls, the two differentiated only by individual variation or distortion from pressure. Hatcher's revision, published in 1902, was sweeping, as he considered almost all hadrosaurid genera then known as synonyms of Trachodon. This included Cionodon, Diclonius, Hadrosaurus, Ornithotarsus, Pteropelyx, and Thespesius, as well as Claorhynchus and Polyonax, fragmentary genera now thought to be ceratopsians. Hatcher's work led to a brief consensus until about 1910, when new material from Canada and Montana showed a greater diversity of hadrosaurids than previously suspected. In 1915, Charles W. Gilmore reassessed hadrosaurids, and recommended that Thespesius should be reintroduced for hadrosaurids from the Lance Formation and rock units of equivalent age, and that Trachodon, based on inadequate material, should be restricted to a hadrosaurid from the older Judith River Formation and its equivalents. In regards to Claosaurus annectens, he recommended that it be considered the same as Thespesius occidentalis. A multiplicity of names resumed, with the AMNH duckbills being known as Diclonius mirabilis, Trachodon mirabilis, Trachodon annectens, Claosaurus, or Thespesius.

=== Anatosaurus to the present ===
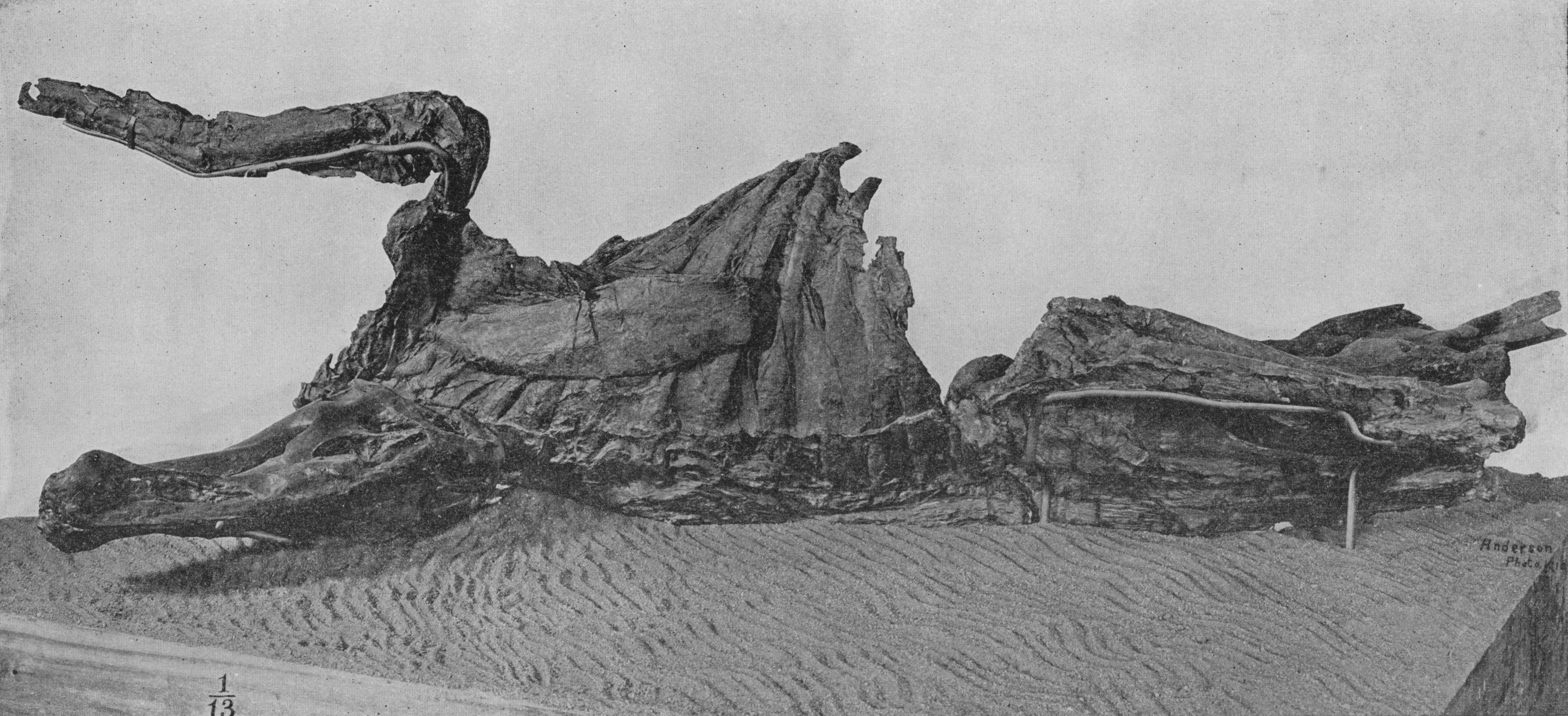
AMNH 5060: a well-preserved specimen of E. annectens

This confusing situation was temporarily resolved in 1942 by Richard Swann Lull and Nelda Wright. In their monograph on hadrosaurian dinosaurs of North America, they opted to settle the questions revolving around the AMNH duckbills, Marsh's Claosaurus annectens, and several other species, by creating a new generic name. They created the new genus Anatosaurus (meaning "duck lizard", because of its wide, duck-like beak; Latin anas = duck + Greek sauros = lizard), and made Marsh's species the type species, calling it Anatosaurus annectens. They also assigned Marsh's Trachodon longiceps to this genus, a pair of species that had been assigned to Thespesius under Gilmore's "Lance Formation hadrosaurid" conception (T. edmontoni from Gilmore in 1924 and T. saskatchewanensis), and Cope's Diclonius mirabilis. Lull and Wright decided to remove the AMNH specimens from Diclonius (or Trachodon), because they found no convincing reason to assign the specimens to either. Because this left the skeletons without a species name, Lull and Wright gave them their own species: Anatosaurus copei, in honor of Cope. Cope's original specimen, AMNH 5730, was made the holotype of the species, with Brown's AMNH 5886 as the plesiotype. Anatosaurus would come to be called the "classic duck-billed dinosaur".

This state of affairs persisted for several decades until Michael K. Brett-Surman reexamined the pertinent material for his graduate studies in the 1970s and 1980s. The name Edmontosaurus annectens was first coined some time in the 1980s. He concluded that the type species of Anatosaurus, A. annectens, was actually a species of Edmontosaurus, and that A. copei was different enough to warrant its own genus. Although theses and dissertations are not regarded as official publications by the International Commission on Zoological Nomenclature, which regulates the naming of organisms, his conclusions were known to other paleontologists, and were adopted by several popular works of the time. His replacement name, Anatotitan (the Latin word anas ("duck"), and the Greek word Titan, meaning large), was known and published as such in the popular literature by 1990. Formal publication of the name Anatotitan copei took place the same year in an article co-written by Brett-Surman with Ralph Chapman (although the name is sometimes credited as Brett-Surman vide Chapman and Brett-Surman, because it came out of Brett-Surman's work). Because the type species of Anatosaurus (A. annectens) was sunk into Edmontosaurus, the name Anatosaurus is abandoned as a junior synonym of Edmontosaurus.

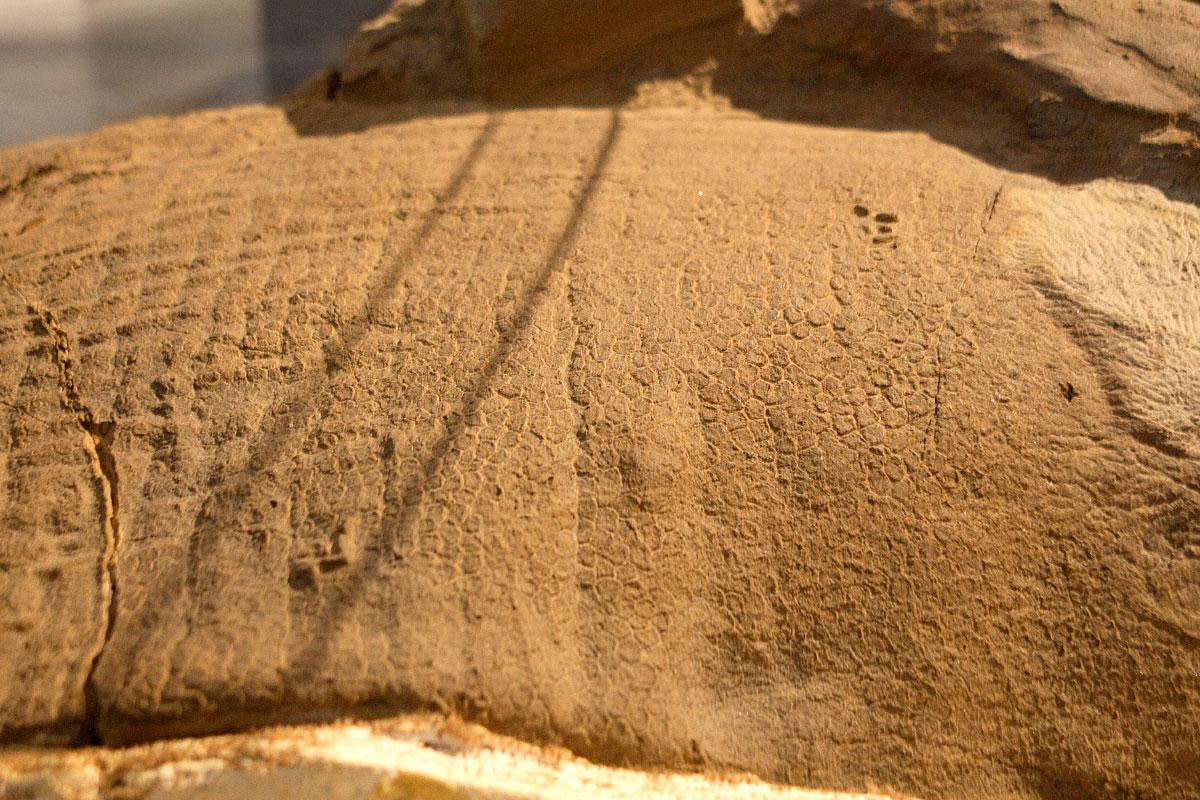
A well-preserved skin impression of the specimen nicknamed "Dakota," which was found in 1999

Of the remaining species of Anatosaurus, A. saskatchewanensis and A. edmontoni were assigned to Edmontosaurus as well, and A. longiceps went to Anatotitan, as either a second species or as a synonym of A. copei. A. longiceps may be a synonym of E. annectens, though it has also been treated as a nomen dubium by some.

The conception of Edmontosaurus that emerged included three valid species: the type species E. regalis; E. annectens (including Anatosaurus edmontoni, emended to edmontonensis); and E. saskatchewanensis. The debate about the proper taxonomy of the A. copei specimens continues to the present day. Returning to Hatcher's argument of 1902, Jack Horner, David B. Weishampel, and Catherine Forster regarded Anatotitan copei as representing specimens of Edmontosaurus annectens with crushed skulls. In 2007, another "mummy" was announced. Nicknamed "Dakota," it was discovered in 1999 by Tyler Lyson, and came from the Hell Creek Formation of North Dakota.

In a 2011 study by Nicolás Campione and David Evans, the authors conducted the first-ever morphometric analysis of the various specimens assigned to Edmontosaurus. They concluded that only two species are valid: E. regalis, from the late Campanian; and E. annectens, from the late Maastrichtian. Their study provided further evidence that Anatotitan copei is a synonym of E. annectens (specifically, that the long, low skull of A. copei is the result of ontogenetic change, and represents mature E. annectens individuals). E. saskatechwanensis represents young E. annectens, and Anatosaurus edmontoni specimens belong to E. regalis—not E. annectens. The reassessment of Edmontosaurus assigns twenty skulls to E. annectens. Adult skulls of E. annectens can be distinguished from skulls of E. regalis by the elongate snout and other details of skull anatomy, such as the small comb on top of the latter's skull.

== Description ==
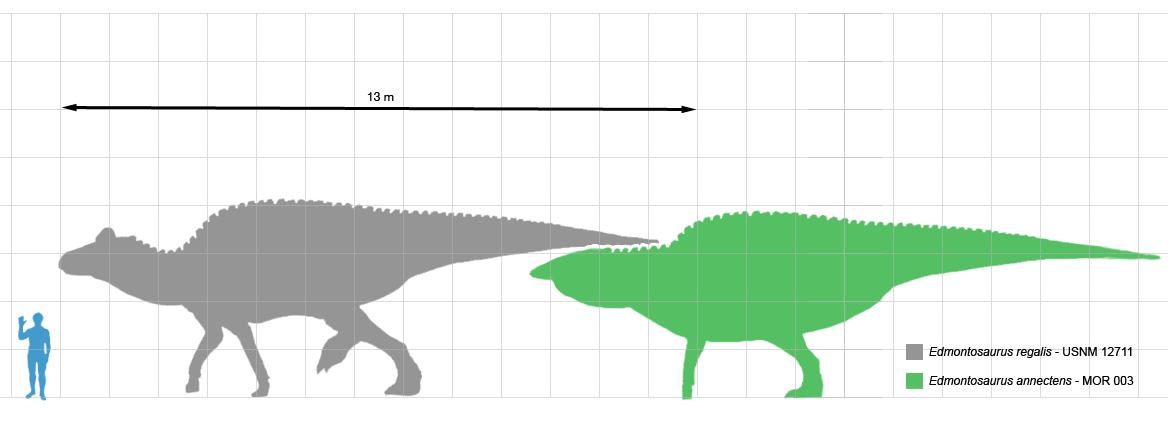
Scale diagram comparing large adult specimens of E. regalis (gray) and E. annectens (green) to a human

The skull and skeleton of E. annectens are very well-known. Edward Drinker Cope estimated the length of one specimen as about 38 feet (12 m) long, with a skull 3.87 feet (1.18 m) long.^{*} This body length estimate was later revised down to a length of 29 feet (8.8 m). To be fair to Cope, a dozen vertebrae, the hips, and thigh bones had been carried away by a stream cutting through the skeleton, and the tip of the tail was incomplete. A second skeleton currently exhibited next to Cope's specimen, but in a standing posture, is estimated at 30 feet (9.1 m) long, with its head 17 feet (5.2 m) above the ground. The hip height of this specimen is estimated as approximately 6.9 feet (2.1 m). Other sources have estimated the length of E. annectens as approximately 39 feet (12 m). Most specimens are somewhat shorter, representing individuals that are not fully grown. Two well-known mounted skeletons, USNM 2414 and YPM 2182, measure 26.25 feet (8.00 m) long and 29.3 feet (8.9 m) long, respectively. E. annectens may have weighed about 7.3 tonnes (7.3 t) when fully grown.

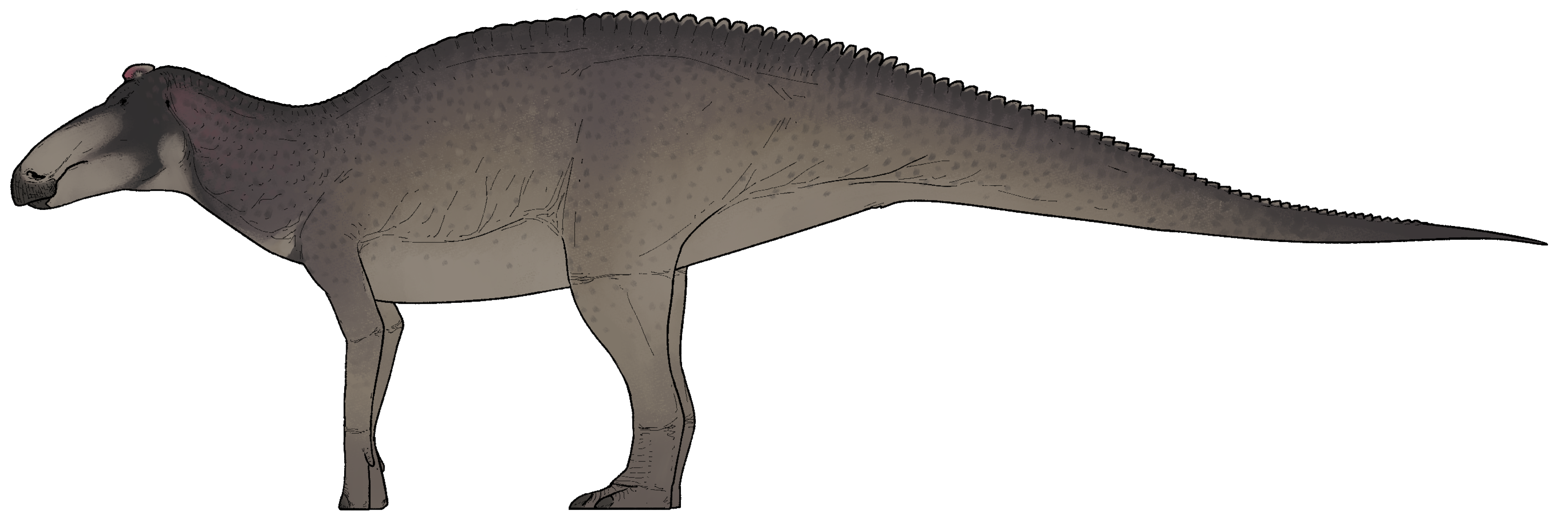
Life reconstruction of E. annectens based on preserved soft tissues

Recently-found specimens that are still under study at the Museum of the Rockies, namely MOR 1142 ("X-rex") and MOR 1609 ("Becky's Giant"), suggest that E. annectens may have reached lengths of nearly 15 metres (49 ft) and weighed 15.87 metric tons (17.49 short tons), potentially making it one of the largest hadrosaurids ever. However, Jack Horner and his colleagues suggested that such large individuals would have been extremely rare. The 2022 study on the osteohistology and growth of E. annectens suggested that previous estimates might have underestimated or overestimated the size of this dinosaur, and argued that a fully grown adult E. annectens would have measured up to 36–39 feet (11–12 m) in length and 5.6 metric tons (6.2 short tons) in average asymptotic body mass, while the largest individuals measured more than 6 metric tons (6.6 short tons) and even up to 6.6–7 metric tons (7.3–7.7 short tons), based on the comparison between various specimens of different sizes from the Ruth Mason Dinosaur Quarry and other specimens from different localities.

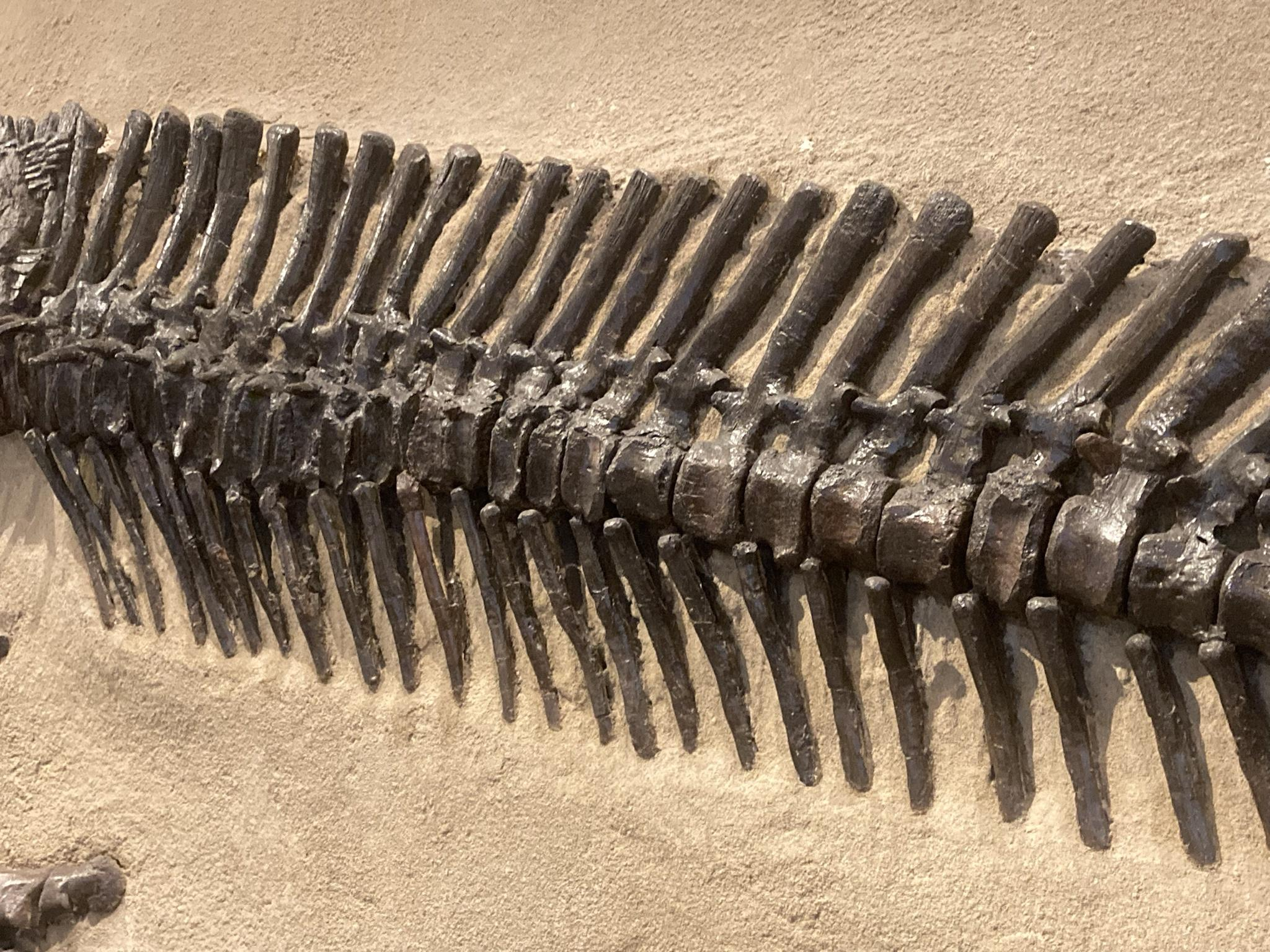
Tail vertebrae

The skull of E. annectens is known for its long, wide muzzle. Cope compared this feature to that of a goose in side view, and to a short-billed spoonbill in top view. The skull was proportionally longer and lower than in any other known hadrosaurid. The toothless portion of the anterior mandible^{*} was also relatively longer than in any hadrosaur. The extreme length and breadth did not appear until an individual reached maturity, so many specimens lack the distinctive shape. The bones surrounding the large openings for the nostrils formed deep pockets around the openings. The eye sockets were rectangular and longer front to back than they were top to bottom, although this may have been exaggerated by postmortem crushing. The skull roof was flat and lacked a bony crest like that of E. regalis. The quadrate bone that formed the articulation with the lower jaw was distinctly curved. The lower jaw was long, straight, and lacking the downward curve seen in other hadrosaurids, as well as possessing a heavy ridge running its length. The predentary was wide and shovel-like. The ridge on the lower jaw may have reinforced the long, slender structure.

As mounted, the vertebral column of E. annectens includes twelve neck, twelve back, nine sacral, and at least thirty tail vertebrae. The limb bones were longer and more lightly built than those of other hadrosaurids of comparable size. E. annectens had a distinctive pelvis, based on the proportions and form of the pubis bone. E. annectens, like other hadrosaurids, could move both on two legs and on four legs. It probably preferred to forage for food on four legs, but ran on two. Henry Fairfield Osborn used the skeletons in the American Museum of Natural History to portray both quadrupedal and bipedal stances for E. annectens.

Details of the E. annectens "mummies" first described by Sereno et al. (2025)

In 2025, Sereno and colleagues described two well-preserved "mummy" specimens from Wyoming, revealing that Edmontosaurus annectens bore a fleshy crest, just like its older relative Edmontosaurus regalis, over the neck and back, in addition to an interdigitating row of spikes over the hips and tail. The toes of the hindlimb are capped with large hooves.

== Classification ==
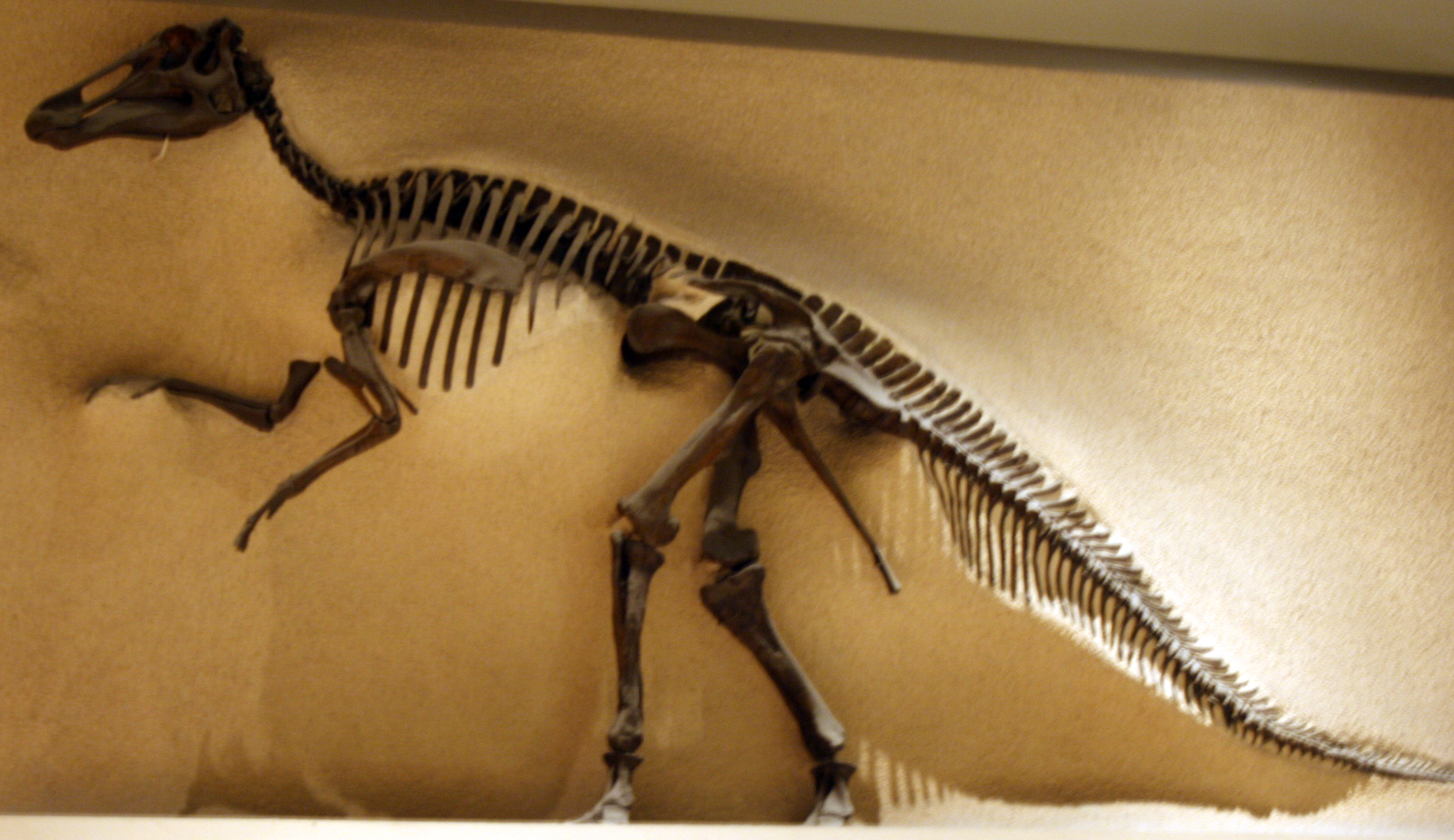
E. annectens holotype, Smithsonian National Museum of Natural History

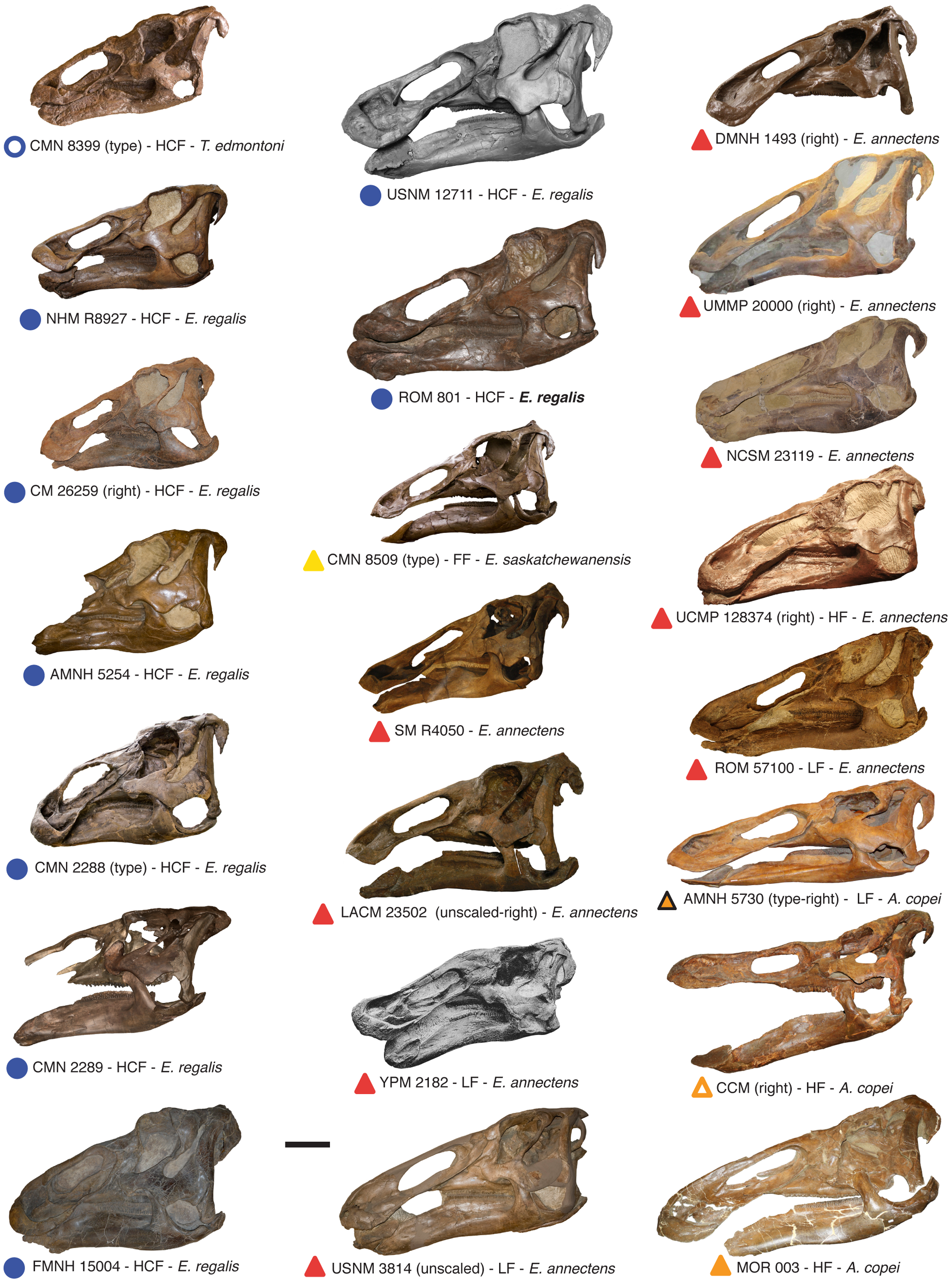
Most known complete Edmontosaurus skulls (E. annectens from lower middle to right).

E. annectens was a saurolophine, or "flat-headed", hadrosaurid. This group was historically known as Hadrosaurinae. Species now considered to be synonymous with Edmontosaurus annectens were long recognized as closely related to both the genus and the species. However, the skull of the sub-adult type specimen of E. annectens differs noticeably from fully mature remains, so many researchers had classified the two growth stages as different species, or even different genera. On the other side of the issue, other authors, from John Bell Hatcher in 1902, to Jack Horner, David B. Weishampel, and Catherine Forster in 2004, and most recently Nicolás Campione and David Evans, have proposed that the large, flat-headed specimens most recently classified as Anatotitan copei belong to E. annectens.

E. annectens was also historically classified in an independent genus, Anatosaurus, following the influential 1942 revision of Hadrosauridae by Richard Swann Lull and Nelda Wright, until it was reclassified as a species of Edmontosaurus by Michael K. Brett-Surman. With the discovery that A. copei and E. annectens most likely represent the same species, some paleontologists have proposed using Anatosaurus as a valid genus name for E. annectens.

The cladogram below follows Godefroit et al. (2012) analysis.

- - Bactrosaurus
  - Hadrosauridae
    - Hadrosaurinae
      - Hadrosaurus
      - Lophorhothon
    - Saurolophidae
      - Lambeosaurinae
      - Saurolophinae
        - Wulagasaurus
        - - Brachylophosaurini
            - Acristavus
            - - Maiasaura
              - Brachylophosaurus
          - - Kritosaurus
            - - - Gryposaurus latidens
                - - Gryposaurus notabilis
                  - Gryposaurus monumentensis
              - - Saurolophini
                  - Prosaurolophus
                  - - Saurolophus angustirostris
                    - Saurolophus osborni
                - Edmontosaurini
                  - - Kerberosaurus
                    - Kundurosaurus
                  - - Edmontosaurus annectens
                    - Edmontosaurus regalis

== Paleobiology ==
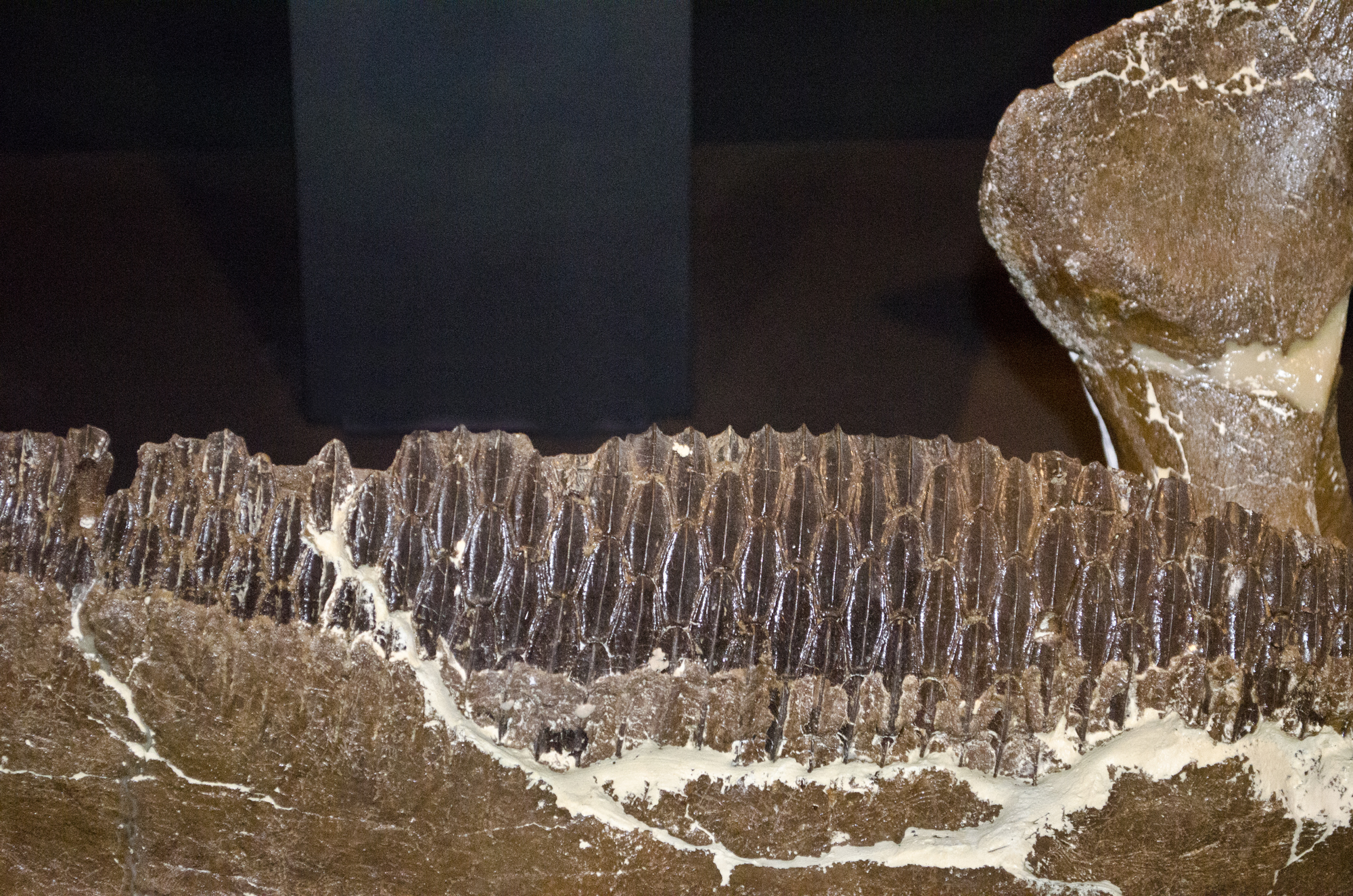
Close-up of teeth

As a hadrosaurid, Edmontosaurus annectens was a fairly large herbivore, eating plants with a sophisticated skull that permitted a grinding motion analogous to chewing. Their teeth were continually replaced and packed into dental batteries that contained hundreds of teeth, but only a relative handful of them were in use at any time. Plant material would have been cropped by the broad beak, and held in the jaws by a cheek-like structure. Feeding would have been from the ground up to around 13 feet (4 m) above the ground. Like other hadrosaurs, they could have moved both bipedally and quadrupedally.

The extensive depressions surrounding its nasal openings may have hosted nasal diverticula. These postulated diverticula would have taken the form of inflatable soft-tissue sacs. Such sacs could be used for both visual and auditory signals.

A preserved rhamphotheca present in specimen LACM 23502, housed in the Los Angeles County Museum, also indicates the beak of Edmontosaurus was more hook-shaped and extensive than many illustrations in scientific and public media have previously depicted.

=== Growth ===
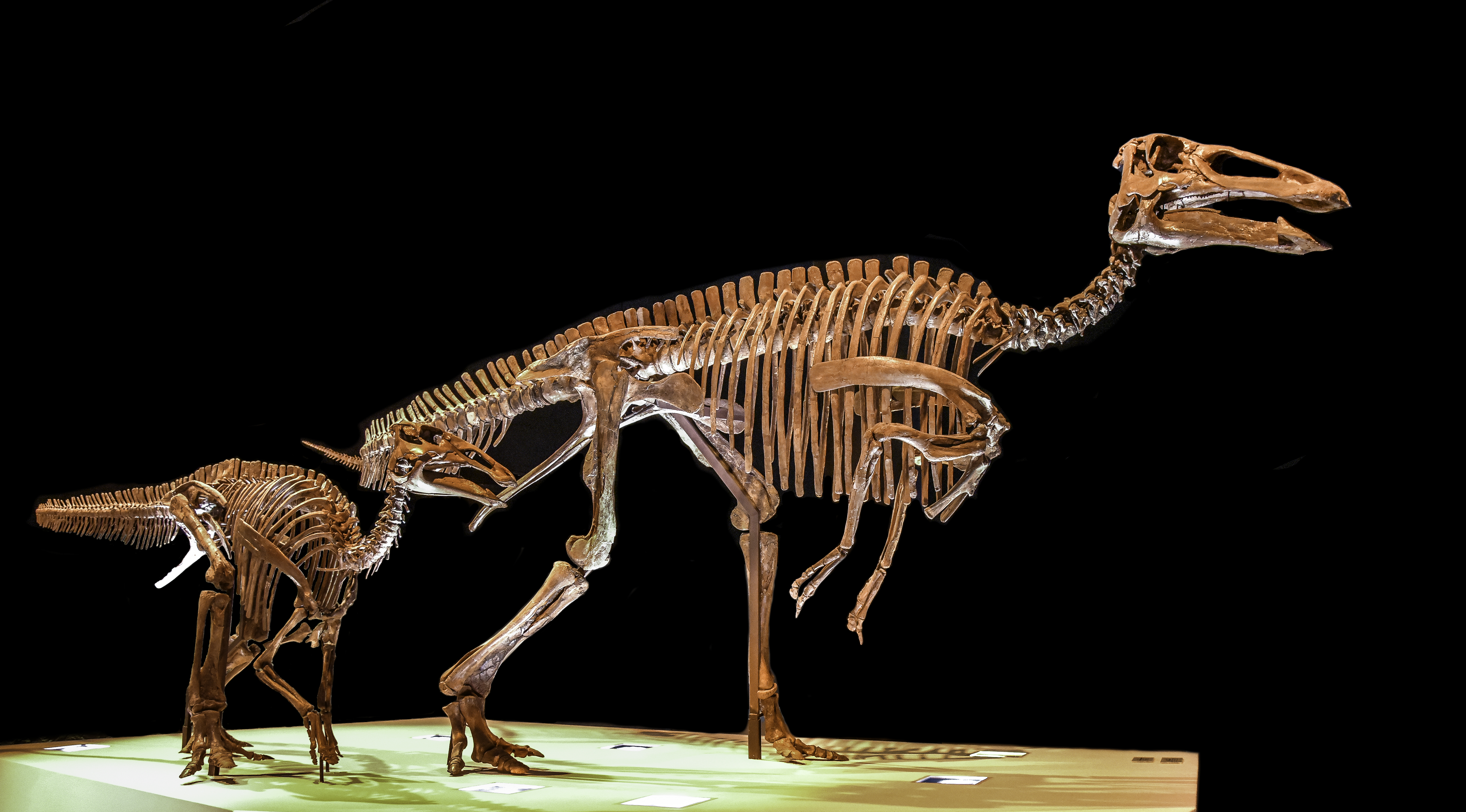
Mounted skeletons of a juvenile and adult E. annectens at the Houston Museum of Natural Science, nicknamed Diana and Leon

In a 2011 study, Campione and Evans recorded data from all known "edmontosaur" skulls from the Campanian and Maastrichtian, and used it to plot a morphometric graph, comparing variable features of the skulls with skull size. Their results showed that, in both recognized Edmontosaurus species, many features previously used to classify additional species or genera were directly correlated to skull size. Campione and Evans interpreted these results as strongly suggesting that the shape of Edmontosaurus skulls changed dramatically as they grew and matured. This has led to several apparent mistakes in past classification. The three previously recognized Maastrichtian edmontosaur species likely represent growth stages of a single species, with E. saskatchewanensis representing juveniles, E. annectens subadults, and Anatotitan copei being fully mature adults. The skulls became longer and flatter as the animals grew. In a 2022 study, Wosik and Evans proposed that E. annectens reached maturity in nine years, based on their analysis for various specimens from different localities. They found the result to be similar to that of other hadrosaurs.

== Paleoecology ==
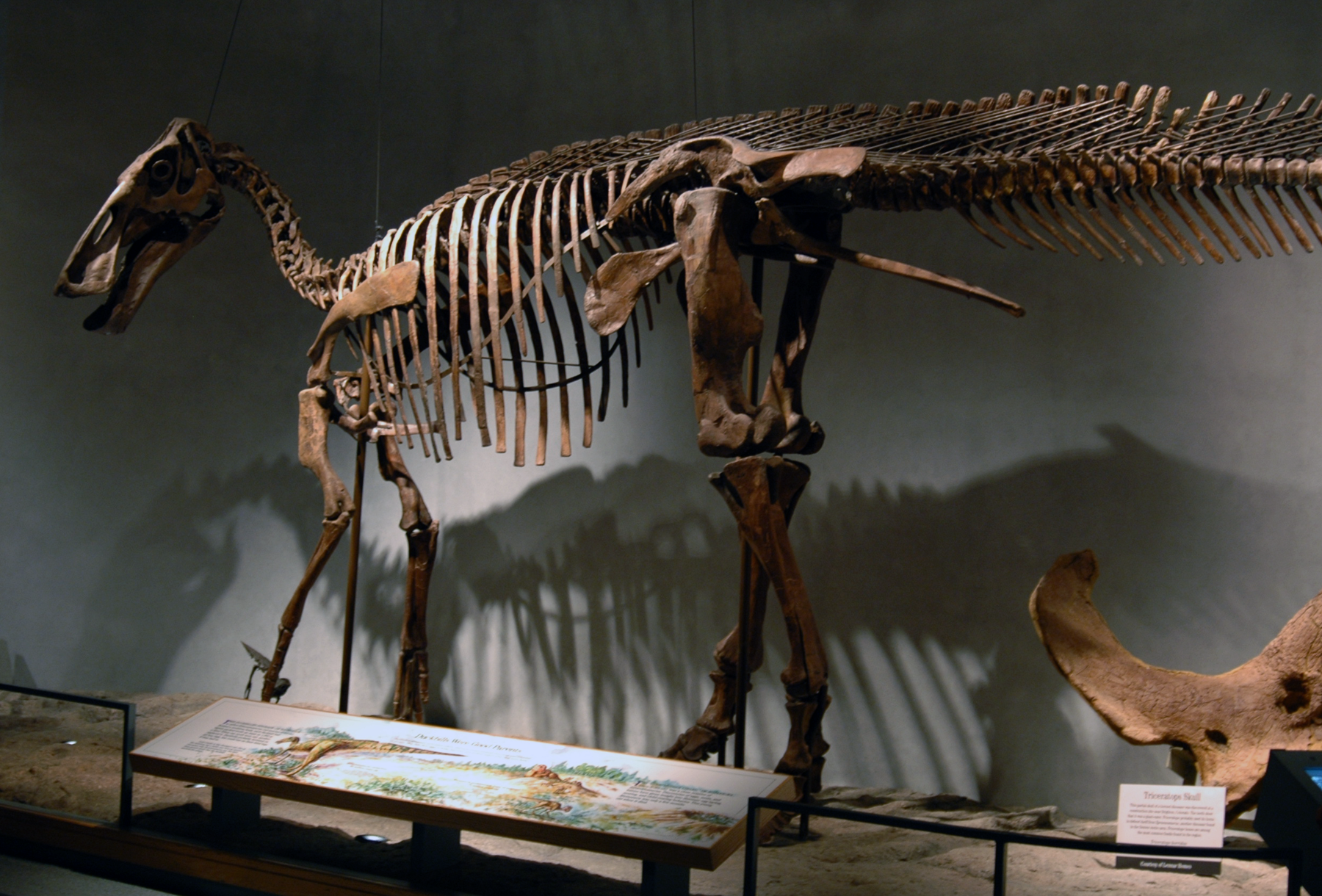
The damage to the tail vertebrae of this E. annectens skeleton (on display at the Denver Museum of Nature and Science) indicates that it may have been bitten by a Tyrannosaurus.

True E. annectens remains are known only from latest Maastrichtian rocks of the Hell Creek and Lance Formations of South Dakota, Montana, and Wyoming, alongside the Frenchman Formation of Saskatchewan.

The Lancian time interval was the last interval before the Cretaceous–Paleogene extinction event that killed off the non-avian dinosaurs. Edmontosaurus was one of the most common dinosaurs of the interval. Robert Bakker reports that it made up one-seventh of the large dinosaur sample, with most of the remaining five-sixths made up of Triceratops. The coastal plain Triceratops–Edmontosaurus association, dominated by Triceratops, extended from Colorado to Saskatchewan. Typical dinosaur faunas of the Lancian formations where Edmontosaurus annectens has been found also included: the hypsilophodont Thescelosaurus; the rare ceratopsid Torosaurus; the pachycephalosaurid Pachycephalosaurus; the ankylosaurid Ankylosaurus; and the theropods Ornithomimus, Pectinodon, Acheroraptor, Dakotaraptor, and Tyrannosaurus rex.

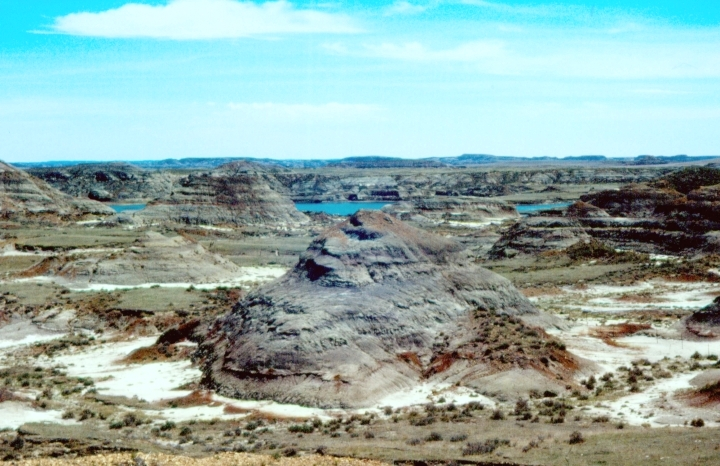
The Hell Creek Formation is well exposed in the badlands in the vicinity of Fort Peck Reservoir.

The Hell Creek Formation, as typified by exposures in the Fort Peck area of Montana, has been interpreted as a flat, forested floodplain, with a relatively dry subtropical climate supporting a variety of plants that ranged from angiosperm trees to conifers, such as bald cypress, as well as ferns and ginkgos. The coastline was hundreds of kilometres or miles to the east. Stream-dwelling turtles and tree-dwelling multituberculate mammals were diverse, and monitor lizards as large as the modern Komodo dragon hunted on the ground. Triceratops was the most abundant large dinosaur, and Thescelosaurus the most abundant small herbivorous dinosaur. Edmontosaur remains have been collected here from stream channel sands, and include fossils from individuals as young as a metre/yard-long infant. The edmontosaur fossils potentially represented accumulations from groups on the move.

The Lance Formation, as typified by exposures approximately 62 miles (100 km) north of Fort Laramie in eastern Wyoming, has been interpreted as a bayou setting similar to the Louisiana coastal plain. It was closer to a large delta than the Hell Creek Formation depositional setting to the north, and consequently received much more sediment. Tropical araucarian conifers and palm trees dotted the hardwood forests, differentiating the flora from the northern coastal plain. The climate was humid and subtropical, with conifers, palmettos, and ferns in the swamps, and conifers, ash, live oak, and shrubs in the forests. Freshwater fish, salamanders, turtles, lizards, snakes, shorebirds, and small mammals lived alongside the dinosaurs. Small dinosaurs are not known in as great of abundance here as in the Hell Creek rocks, but Thescelosaurus once again seems to have been relatively common. Triceratops in this formation is known from many skulls, which tend to be somewhat smaller than those of more northern individuals. The Lance Formation is the setting of two edmontosaur "mummies".

== See also ==
- Timeline of hadrosaur research

== Notes ==
^{*} Many of the original references deal with specimens or species that were not assigned to E. annectens until later. This is particularly true with the specimens long known, chronologically, as Diclonius mirabilis, Anatosaurus copei, and Anatotitan copei. ^* This toothless section is also known as a diastema.
