= Charles R. Knight =

American painter (1874–1953)

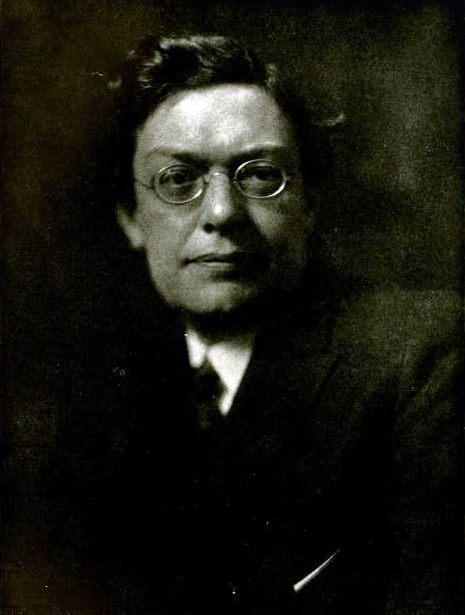
- Photo from c. 1914
- Born: October 21, 1874; Brooklyn, New York
- Died: April 15, 1953 (aged 78); Manhattan, New York
- Known for: Painting

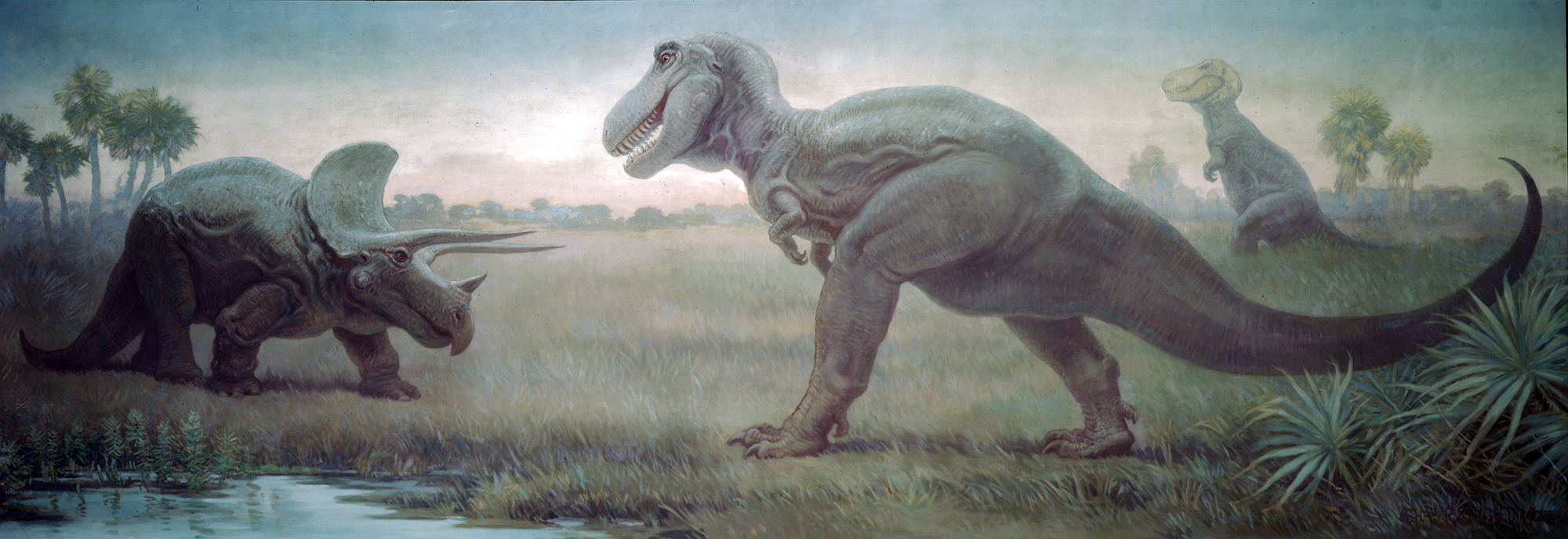
Knight's iconic mural of a Triceratops confronting a Tyrannosaurus, painted for the Field Museum of Natural History in Chicago in 1928, likely his most famous work

Charles Robert Knight (October 21, 1874 – April 15, 1953) was an American wildlife and paleoartist best known for his detailed paintings of dinosaurs and other prehistoric animals. His works have been reproduced in many books and are currently on display at several major museums in the United States. One of his most famous works is a mural of Tyrannosaurus and Triceratops, which helped establish the two dinosaurs as "mortal enemies" in popular culture. Working at a time when many fossil discoveries were fragmentary and dinosaur anatomy was not well understood, many of his illustrations have later been shown to be incorrect representations. Nevertheless, he has been hailed as "one of the great popularizers of the prehistoric past".

== Biography ==
=== Early life ===
Knight was born in Brooklyn, New York City on October 21, 1874.

As a child, Knight was deeply interested in nature and animals, largely thanks to his father's passion for the outdoors, and spent many hours copying the illustrations from his father's natural history books. His father also took him on trips to the American Museum of Natural History which fueled his knowledge for nature. Knight began drawing when he was around five or six years old. In later years he abandoned the practice of drawing from books altogether, and instead drew from life.

Though legally blind because of astigmatism he inherited from his father and after his right eye was struck by a rock by a playmate, Knight pursued his artistic talents with the help of specially designed glasses which he used to paint inches from the canvas for the rest of his life. At the age of twelve, he enrolled at the Metropolitan Art School to become a commercial artist. In 1890, he was hired by church-decorating firm J. & R. Lamb to design stained-glass windows, and after two years with them, became a freelance illustrator for children's books and magazines, specializing in nature scenes. At this time, he met people like Rudyard Kipling and Arthur Conan Doyle. When Knight was eighteen, his father died and he took the little money his father left him and left home.

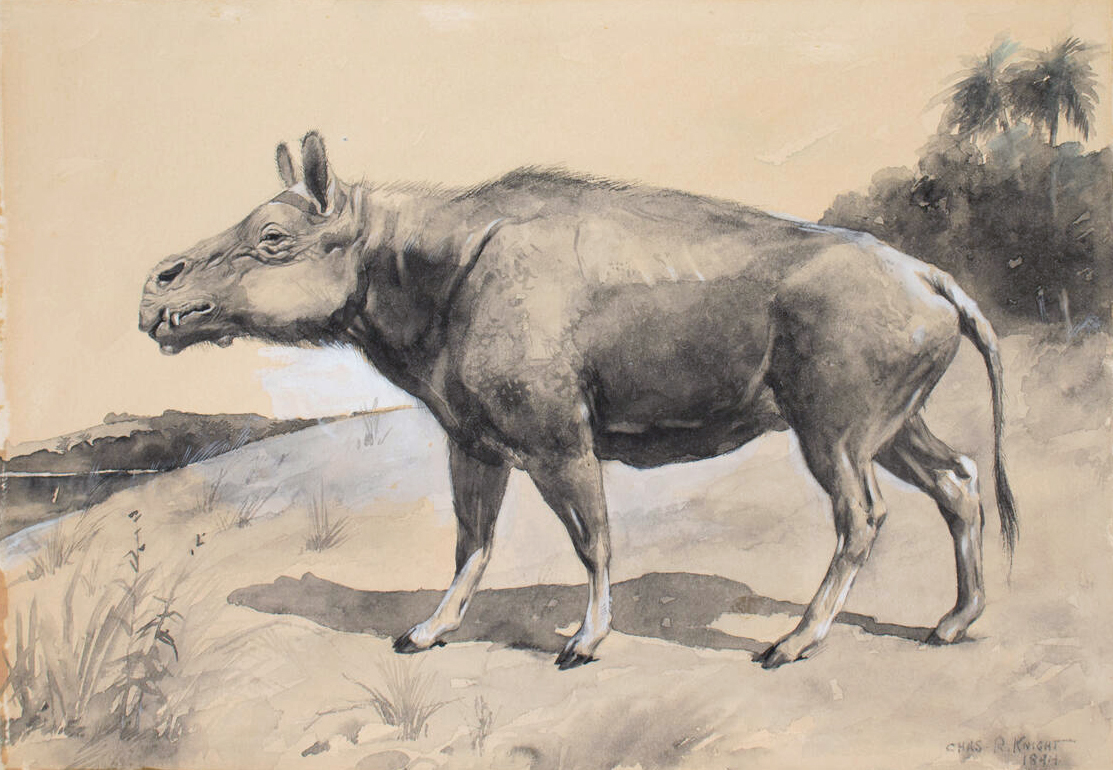
Entelodon (then known as Elotherium), the first commissioned restoration of an extinct animal by Charles R. Knight, 1894

In his free time, Knight visited the American Museum of Natural History, attracting the attention of Dr. Jacob Wortman, who asked Knight to paint a restoration of an extinct hoofed mammal, Elotherium, whose fossilized bones were on display. Knight applied his knowledge of modern pig anatomy, and used his imagination to fill in any gaps. Wortman was thrilled with the final result, and the museum soon commissioned Knight to produce an entire series of watercolors to grace their fossil halls.

After a tour of Europe by visiting many museums and zoos, Knight returned home where he met two key people in the history of paleontology, Edward Drinker Cope and Henry Fairfield Osborn. Osborn then created the new Department of Vertebrate Paleontology at AMNH and he had a revolutionary idea to put entire skeletons of dinosaurs on display. Originally, fossils were kept out of the public's eye and were then stored in store room shelves for study by scientists only. But Osborn had the idea of creating these new exhibits for the public. He assembled a team of himself, Knight, and Dr. William Diller Matthew. Knight sketched the skeletons while Matthew and Osborn mounted them. Cope died shortly after Knight met with him after he became impressed by Knight's sketches.

The museum was amazed by his watercolor paintings and the successful exhibits. J. P. Morgan (the famous banker), who was a patron to the museum, helped finance the restorations of prehistoric life. His paintings were hugely popular among visitors, and Knight continued to work with the museum until the late 1930s, painting what would become some of the world's most iconic images of dinosaurs, prehistoric mammals, and prehistoric humans.

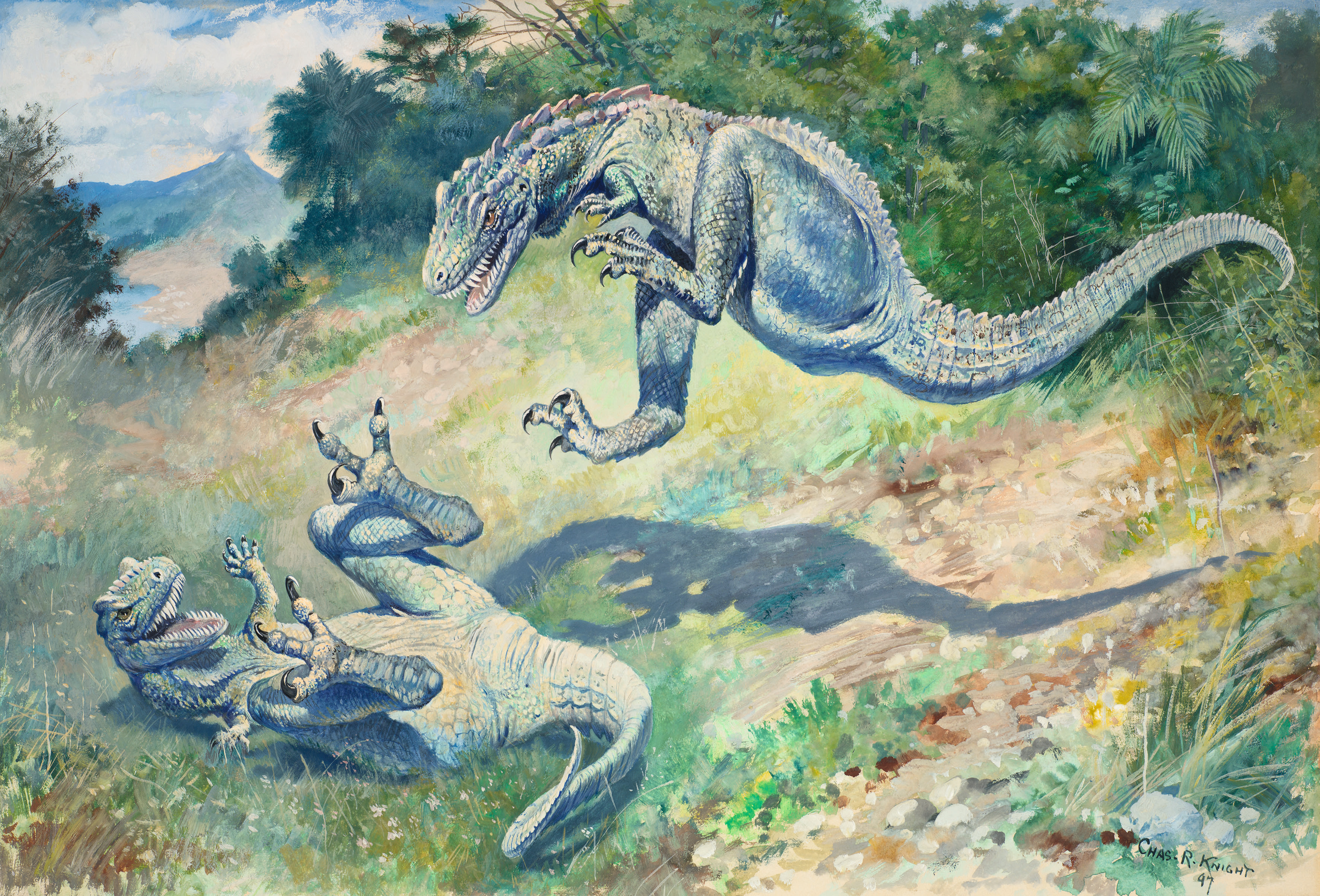
Leaping Laelaps by Charles R. Knight, 1897--the dinosaur is now called Dryptosaurus

One of Knight's best-known pieces for the American Museum of Natural History is 1897's Leaping Laelaps, which was one of the few pre-1960s images to present dinosaurs as active, fast-moving creatures (thus anticipating the "Dinosaur Renaissance" theories of modern paleontologists like Robert Bakker). Other familiar American Museum paintings include Knight's portrayals of Agathaumas, Allosaurus, Apatosaurus, Brontosaurus, Smilodon, and the Woolly Mammoth. All of these have been reproduced in numerous places and have inspired many imitations.

Knight's work for the museum was not without critics, however. Although he spent considerable time at zoos studying the movements and habits of living animals, many curators argued that his work was more artistic than scientific, and protested that he did not have sufficient scientific expertise to render prehistoric animals as precisely as he did. While Knight himself agreed that his murals for the Hall of the Age of Man were "primarily a work of art," he insisted that he had as much paleontological knowledge as the museum's own curators.

In 1900, Knight married Annie Humphrey Hardcastle and had a daughter named Lucy.

=== Nationwide attention ===
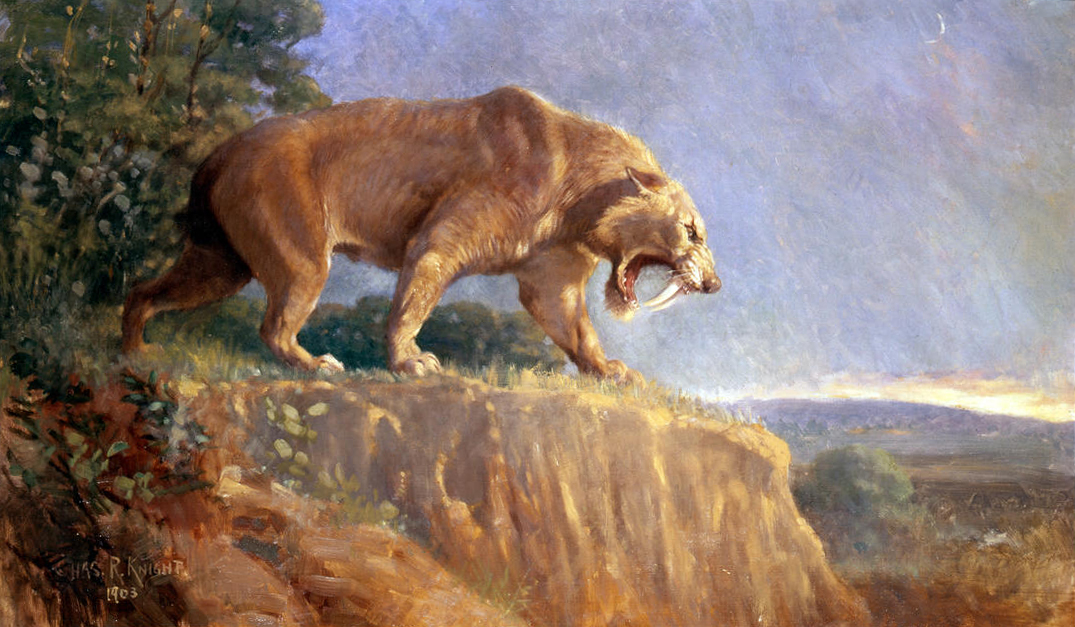
Smilodon from 1903

After Knight established a reputation at the American Museum of Natural History, other natural history museums began requesting paintings for their own fossil exhibits. In 1925, for example, Knight produced an elaborate mural for the Natural History Museum of Los Angeles County which portrayed some of the birds and mammals whose remains had been found in the nearby La Brea Tar Pits. The following year, Knight began a 28-mural series for Chicago's Field Museum of Natural History, a project which chronicled the history of life on earth and took four years to complete. At the Field Museum, he produced one of his best-known pieces, a mural featuring Tyrannosaurus and Triceratops. This confrontation scene between a predator and its prey became iconic and inspired a huge number of imitations, establishing these two dinosaurs as "mortal enemies" in the public consciousness. The Field Museum's Alexander Sherman said, "It is so well loved that it has become the standard encounter for portraying the age of dinosaurs".

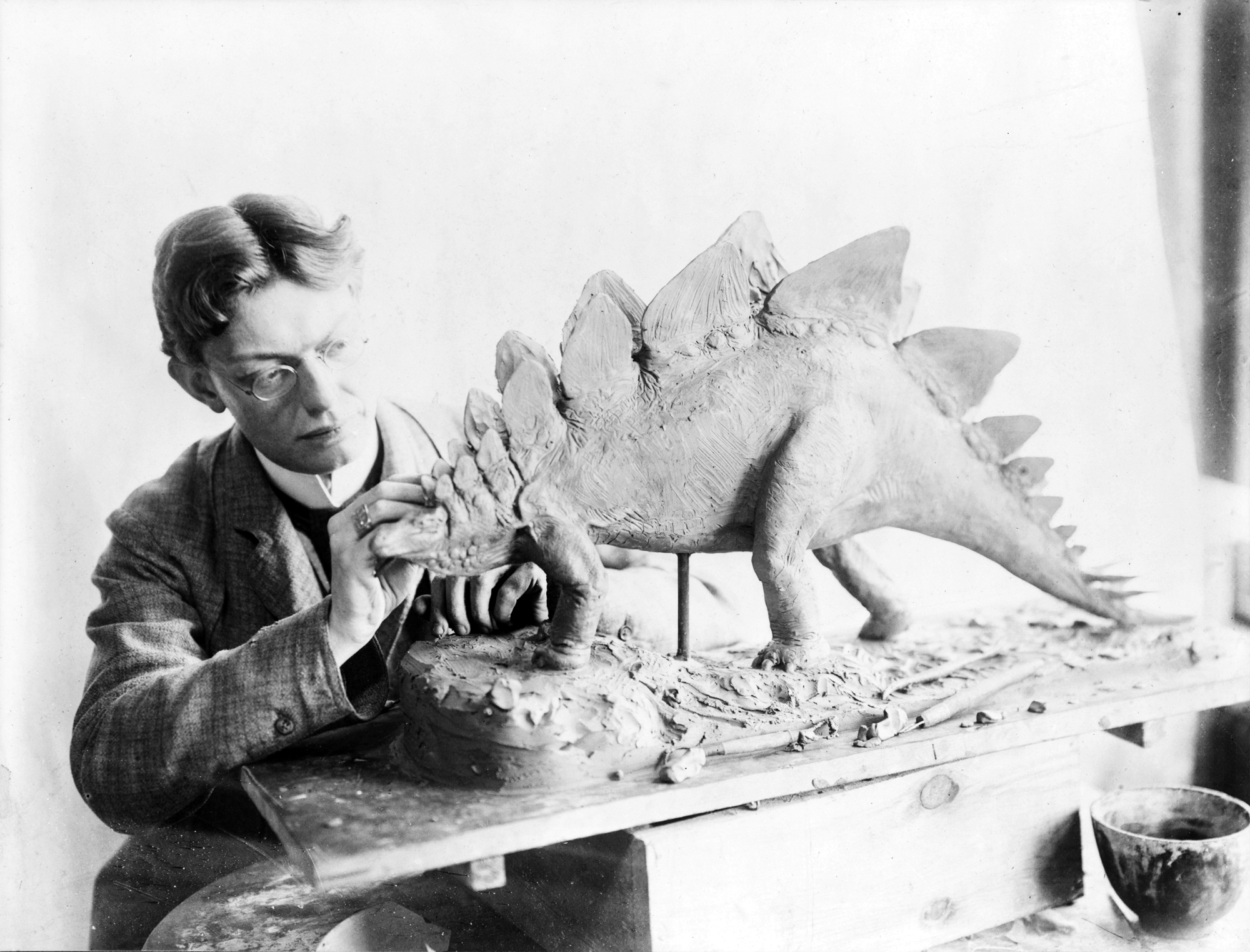
Knight working on Stegosaurus in 1899

Knight's work also found its way to the Carnegie Museums in Pittsburgh, the Smithsonian Institution, and Yale's Peabody Museum of Natural History, among others. Knight also created sculptures of animals both living and extinct. Several zoos, such as the Bronx Zoo, Lincoln Park Zoo, and Brookfield Zoo, also approached Knight to paint murals of their living animals, and Knight enthusiastically complied. Knight was actually the only person in America allowed to paint Su Lin, a giant panda that lived at Brookfield Zoo during the 1930s.

Although Knight's interest in animals and animal anatomy is well known, Knight also had an interest in botany. He often traveled to Florida and used the palm trees for his prehistoric paintings.

While making murals for museums and zoos, Knight continued illustrating books and magazines, and became a frequent contributor to National Geographic. He also wrote and illustrated several books of his own, such as Before the Dawn of History (Knight, 1935), Life Through the Ages (1946), Animal Drawing: Anatomy and Action for Artists (1947), and Prehistoric Man: The Great Adventure (1949). Additionally, Knight became a popular lecturer, describing prehistoric life to audiences across the country.

Eventually, Knight began to retire from the public sphere to spend more time with his grandchildren, mostly his granddaughter Rhoda, who shared his passion for animals and prehistoric life. In his later years, his eyesight began to deteriorate and he painted less often. From 1944 to 1946 he painted his final series of paintings at the National History Museum of Los Angeles County.

In 1951, he painted his last work, a mural for the Everhart Museum in Scranton, Pennsylvania. Two years later, on April 15, 1953, Knight died in New York City.

== Legacy ==
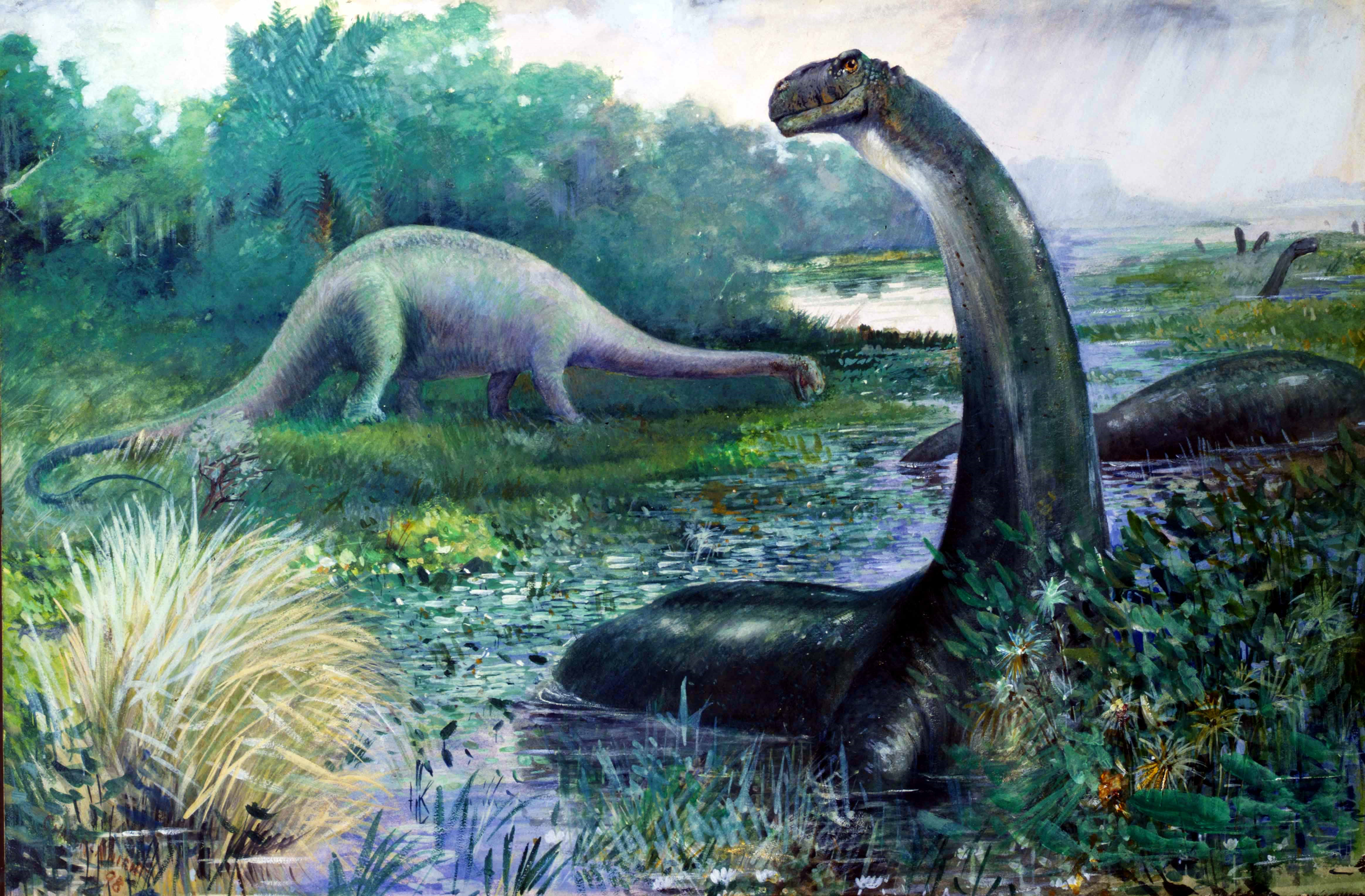
Brontosaurus, 1897

Knight has been hailed as "one of the great popularizers of the prehistoric past", and as having influenced generations of museum-goers. Examples of Knight's work frequently appeared in dinosaur books published in the US during the first half of the twentieth century and countless other artists and illustrators borrowed heavily from Knight's conceptions of dinosaurs and other prehistoric animals. More recent works also include examples of Knight's paintings; for example, Stephen Jay Gould used one of Knight's paintings for the cover of his 1991 book Bully for Brontosaurus and another in his 1996 book Dinosaur in a Haystack. Though other paleoartists have equaled Knight, including Zdeněk Burian, Knight's paintings still remain very popular among dinosaur and paleontology enthusiasts. A commemorative edition of Knight's 1946 book Life Through the Ages ISBN 0-253-33928-6 was recently published by Indiana University Press, and a 2007 calendar ISBN 0-7649-3622-0 of Knight's paintings is also currently available. Additionally, fantasy artist William Stout has compiled a series of Charles Knight Sketchbooks, which contain many rare and previously unpublished drawings and studies by Knight.

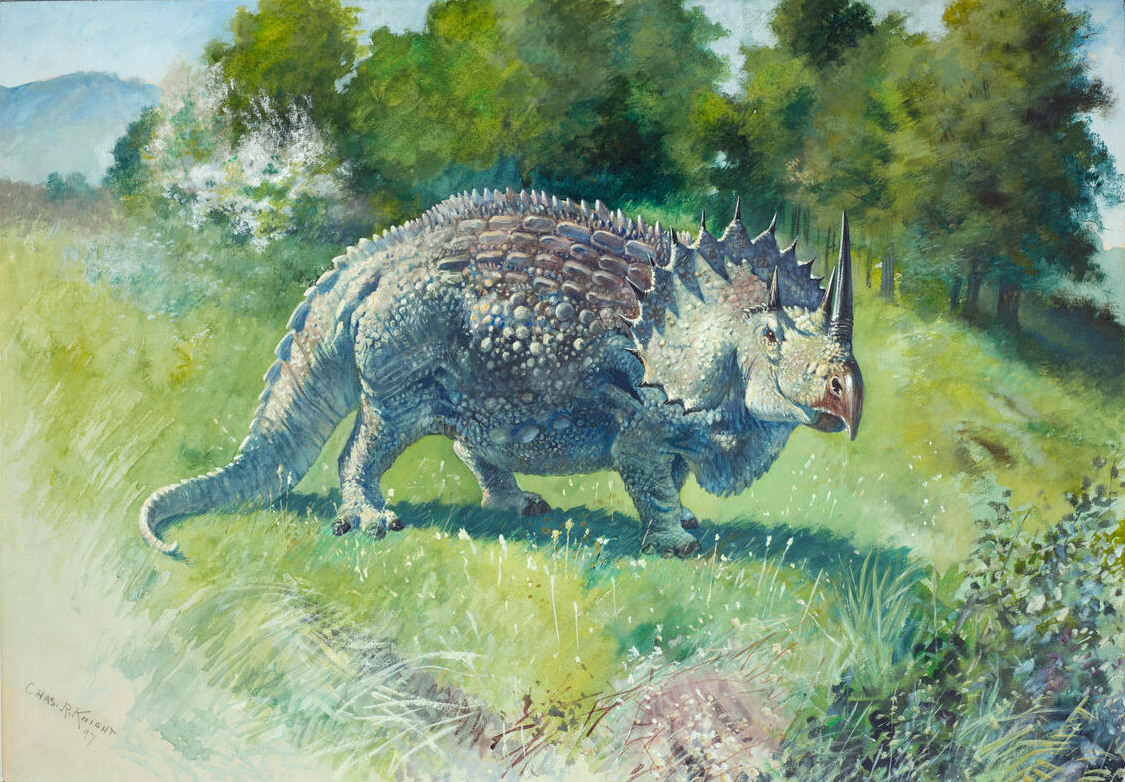
Knight's restoration of Agathaumas from 1897, which was later used as basis for a model Agathaumas used in the 1925 film The Lost World

Because Knight worked in an era when new and often fragmentary fossils were coming out of the American west in quantity, not all of his creations were based on solid evidence; dinosaurs such as his improbably adorned Agathaumas (1897) for example, were somewhat speculative. His depictions of better-known ceratopsians as solitary animals inhabiting lush grassy landscapes were largely imaginative (the grasslands that feature in many of his paintings didn't appear until the Cenozoic). Although Knight sometimes made musculoskeletal studies of living animals, he did not do so for his dinosaur restorations, and he restored many dinosaurs with typical reptilian-like limbs and narrow hips (Paul, 1996). In the 1920s, studies by the celebrated palaeontologists Alfred Romer and Gerhard Heilmann (Heilmann, 1926) had confirmed that dinosaurs had broad avian-like hips rather than those of a typical reptile. Knight often restored extinct mammals, birds and marine reptiles in very dynamic action poses, but his depictions of large dinosaurs as ponderous swamp-dwellers destined for extinction reflected more traditional concepts (Paul, 1996). In his catalogue to Life through the Ages (1946), he reiterated views that he had written earlier (Knight, 1935), describing the great beasts as "slow-moving dunces" that were "unadaptable and unprogressive" while conceding that small dinosaurs had been more active. Some of his pictures are now known to be wrong, such as the tripod kangaroo-like posture of the hadrosaurs and theropods, whereas their spinal column was roughly horizontal at the hip; and the sauropods standing deeply in water whereas they were land-dwellers. Knight also drew dinosaur tails dragging on the ground, whereas they were held out approximately horizontally.

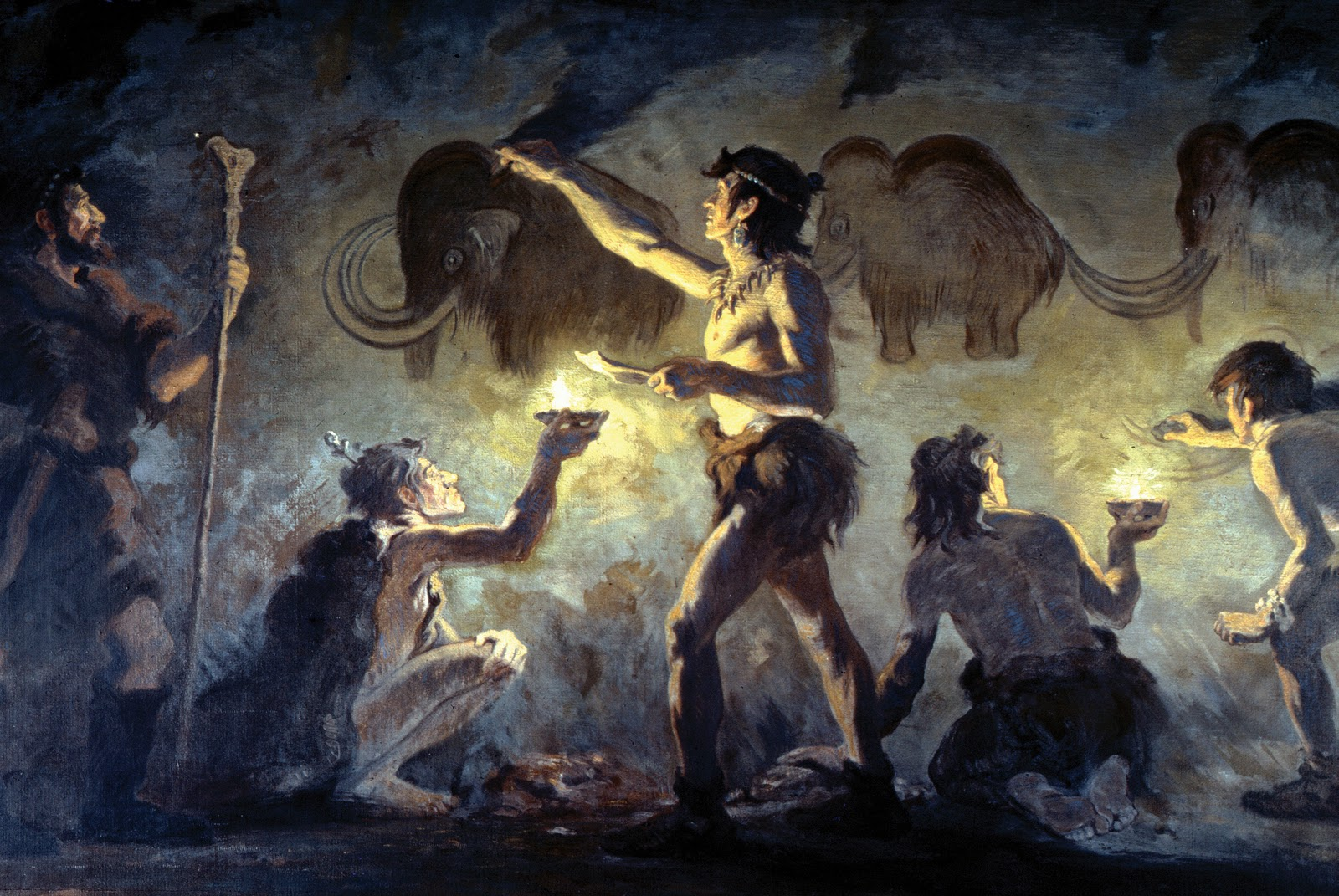
Cro-Magnon artists painting in Font-de-Gaume, 1920

The late Stephen Jay Gould was one of Knight's most well-known fans, notably refusing to refer to Brontosaurus as "Apatosaurus" because Knight had always referred to the creature with the former name. Gould writes in his 1989 book Wonderful Life, "Not since the Lord himself showed his stuff to Ezekiel in the valley of dry bones had anyone shown such grace and skill in the reconstruction of animals from disarticulated skeletons. Charles R. Knight, the most celebrated of artists in the reanimation of fossils, painted all the canonical figures of dinosaurs that fire our fear and imagination to this day". Other admirers have included special effects artist Ray Harryhausen, who writes in his autobiography An Animated Life, "Long before Obie (Willis O'Brien), myself, and Steven Spielberg, he put flesh on creatures that no human had ever seen. […] At the L.A. County Museum I vividly remember a beautiful Knight mural on one of the walls depicting the way the tar pits would have looked in ancient times. This, plus a picture book about Knight's work my mother gave me, were my first encounters with a man who was to prove an enormous help when the time came for me to make three-dimensional models of these extinct beings". Paleoartist Gregory S. Paul has also mentioned Knight as a big influence on him.

In 2012, a book about Knight and his art written by Richard Milner titled Charles R. Knight The Artist Who Saw Through Time was published. It starts with an introduction by Knight's granddaughter Rhoda.

A website dedicated to Knight was created and maintained by Rhoda Knight Kalt (1936-2024) and features many of his paintings.

An homage to the painter was also made in the 1998 IMAX feature film, T-Rex: Back to the Cretaceous, in which he was portrayed by actor Tuck Milligan.

== Collections of works ==
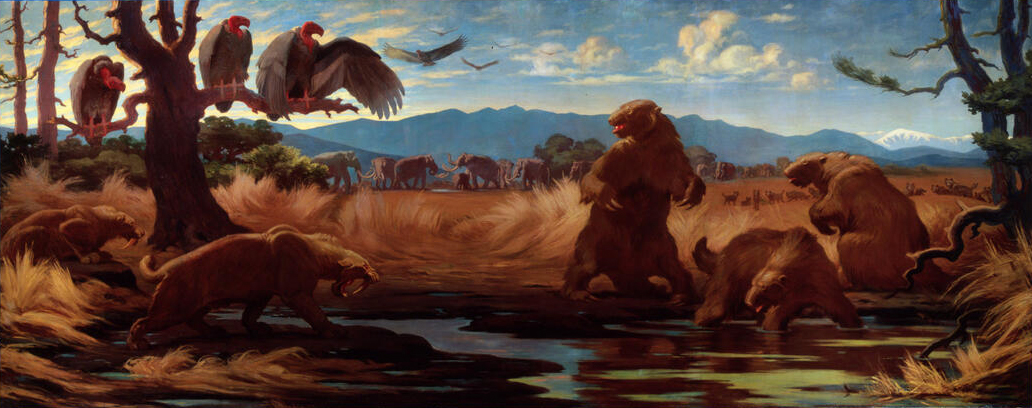
1921 mural at the AMNH, showing the fauna of the La Brea Tar Pits. This image was adapted as the cover illustration for the 1975 book The Mythical Man-Month.

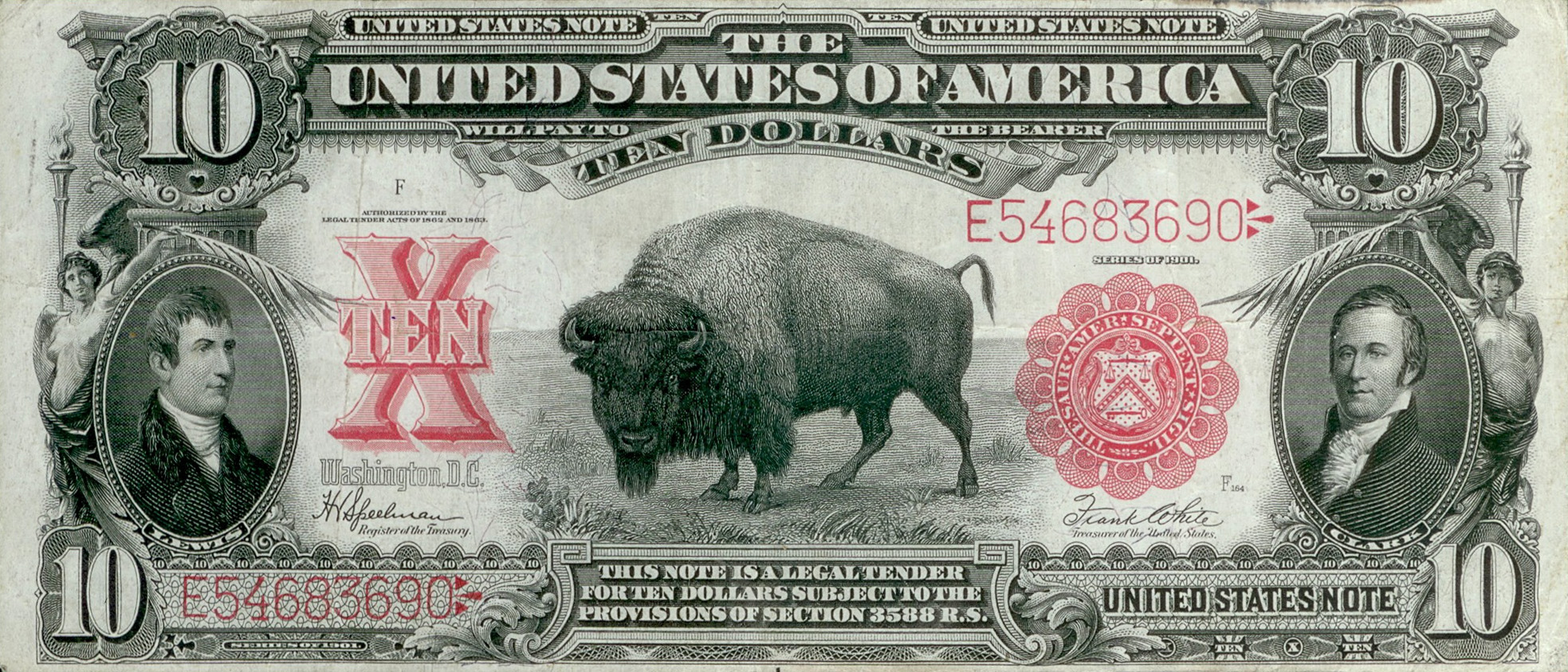
Bison on the 1901 United States ten-dollar bill, drawn by Knight

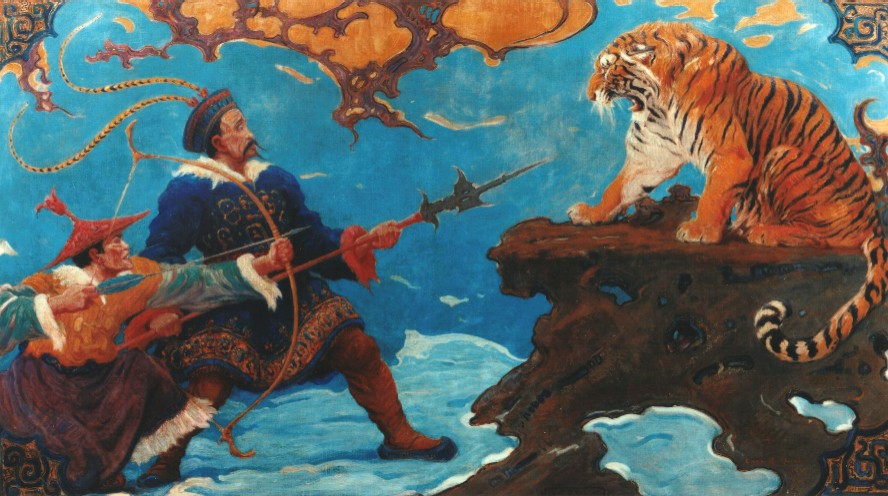
Tiger holding Hunters at bay, 1917

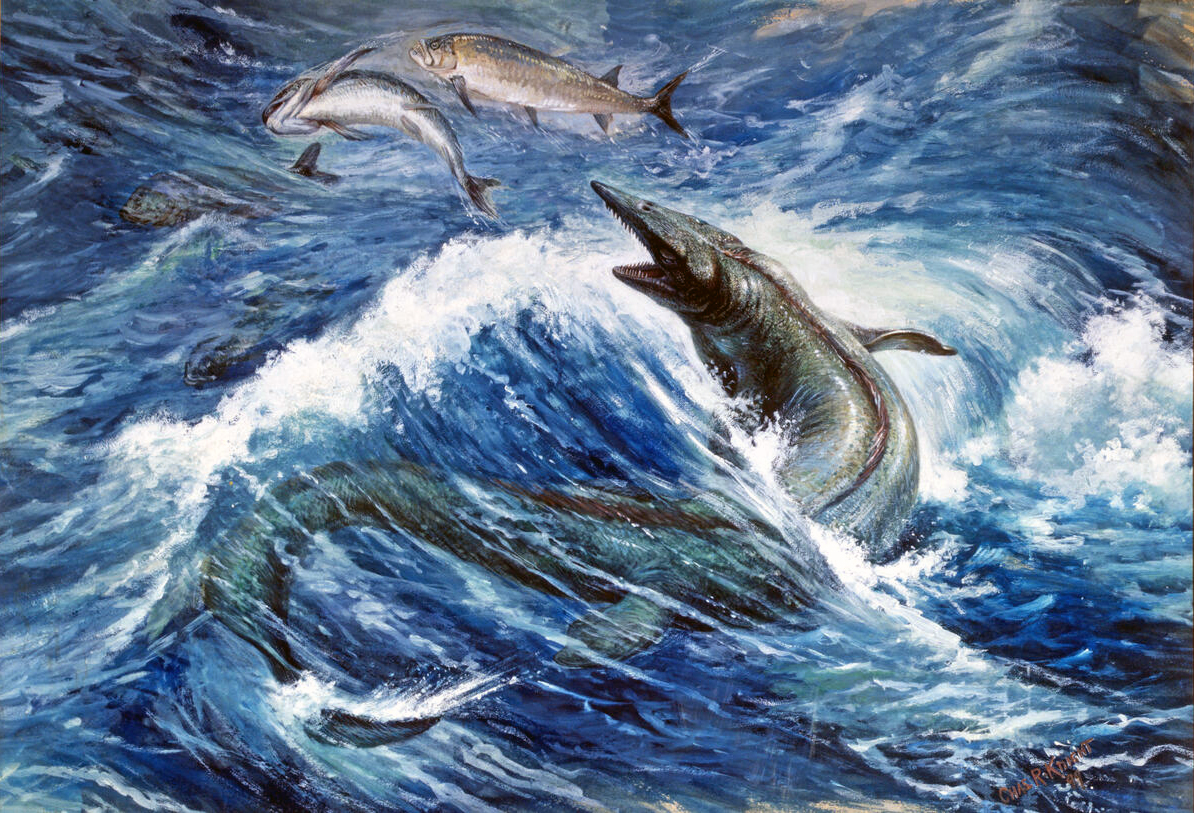
Tylosaurus from 1899

Knight's works are currently included as part of the permanent collections of these colleges, libraries, museums, and zoos:

- Academy of Natural Sciences (Philadelphia, Pennsylvania)
- American Museum of Natural History (New York, New York)
- Bethune-Cookman College (Daytona Beach, Florida)
- Bronx Zoo (Bronx, New York)
- Carnegie Museum of Natural History (Pittsburgh, Pennsylvania)
- The Dinosaur Museum (Blanding, Utah)
- Everhart Museum (Scranton, Pennsylvania)
- Field Museum of Natural History (Chicago, Illinois)
- Florida Museum of Natural History (Gainesville, Florida)
- Illinois State Museum (Springfield, Illinois)
- Mesa Southwest Museum (Mesa, Arizona)
- Museum of the Earth (Ithaca, New York)
- National Museum of Natural History (Washington, DC)
- National Zoo (Washington, DC)
- Natural History Museum of Los Angeles County (Los Angeles, California)
- Princeton University (Princeton, New Jersey)
- Science Museum of Minnesota (Saint Paul, Minnesota)
- Sebring Public Library (Sebring, Florida)
- Yale Peabody Museum of Natural History (New Haven, Connecticut)

In addition, a touring exhibit, Honoring the Life of Charles R. Knight, was launched in 2003 and has visited several locations throughout the United States.

== Gallery ==
=== Field Museum murals (1926—1930) ===
==== Paleozoic ====
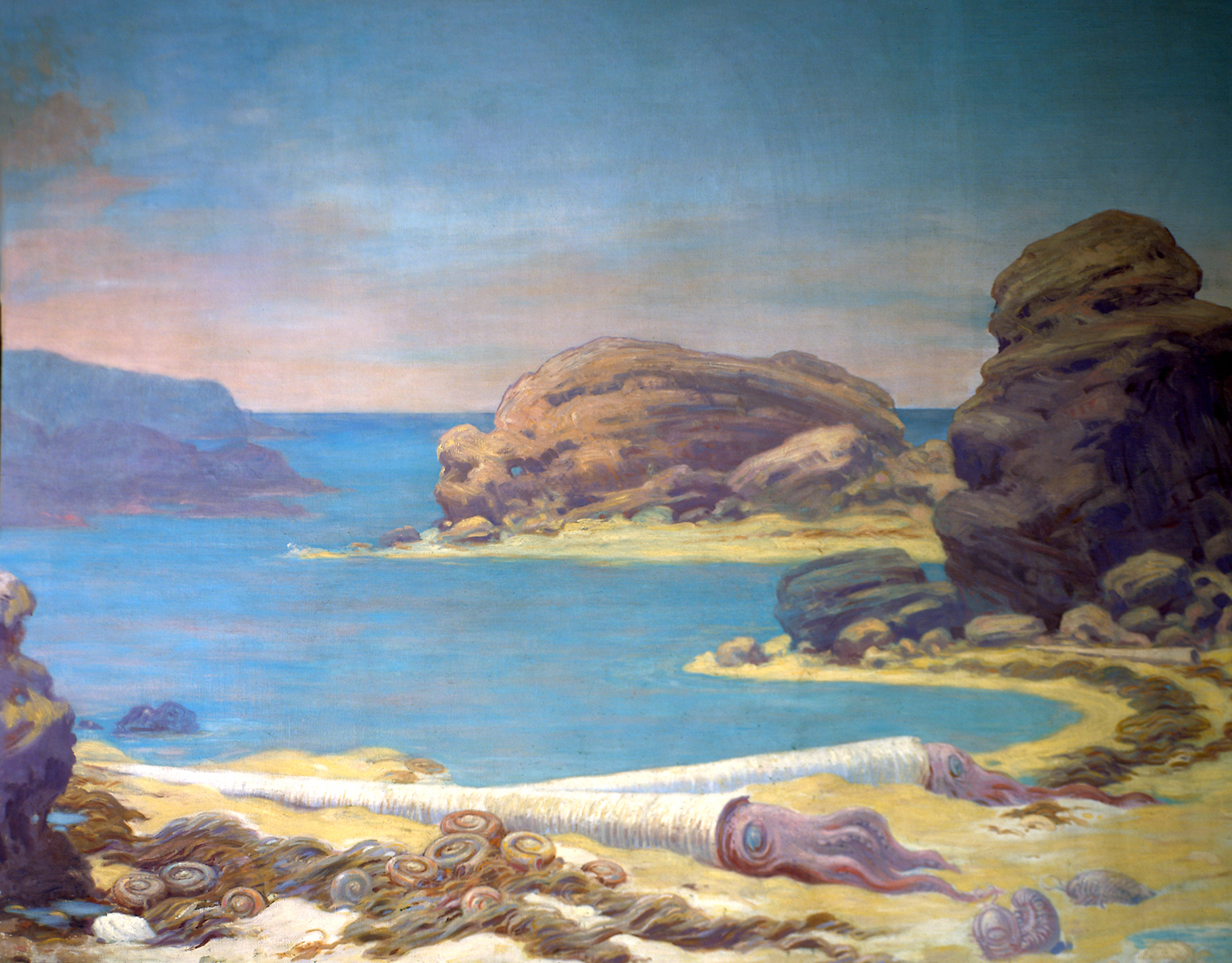
Beached nautiloids from the Ordovician

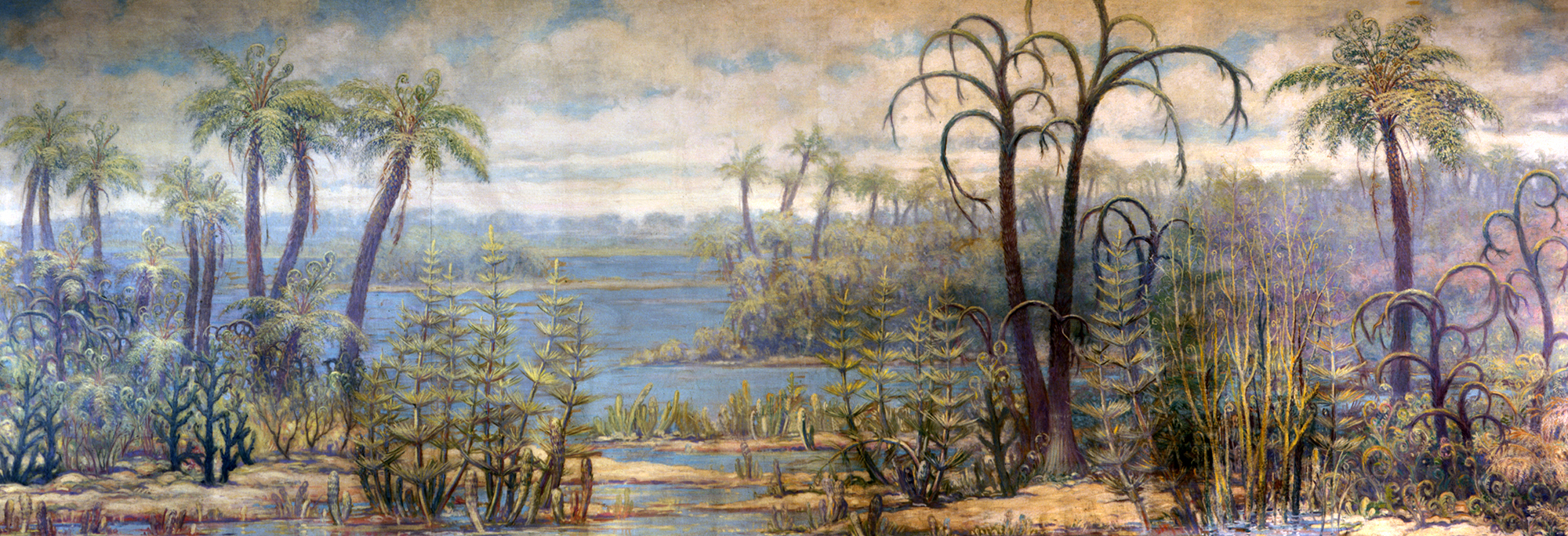
Early terrestrial plants from the Devonian

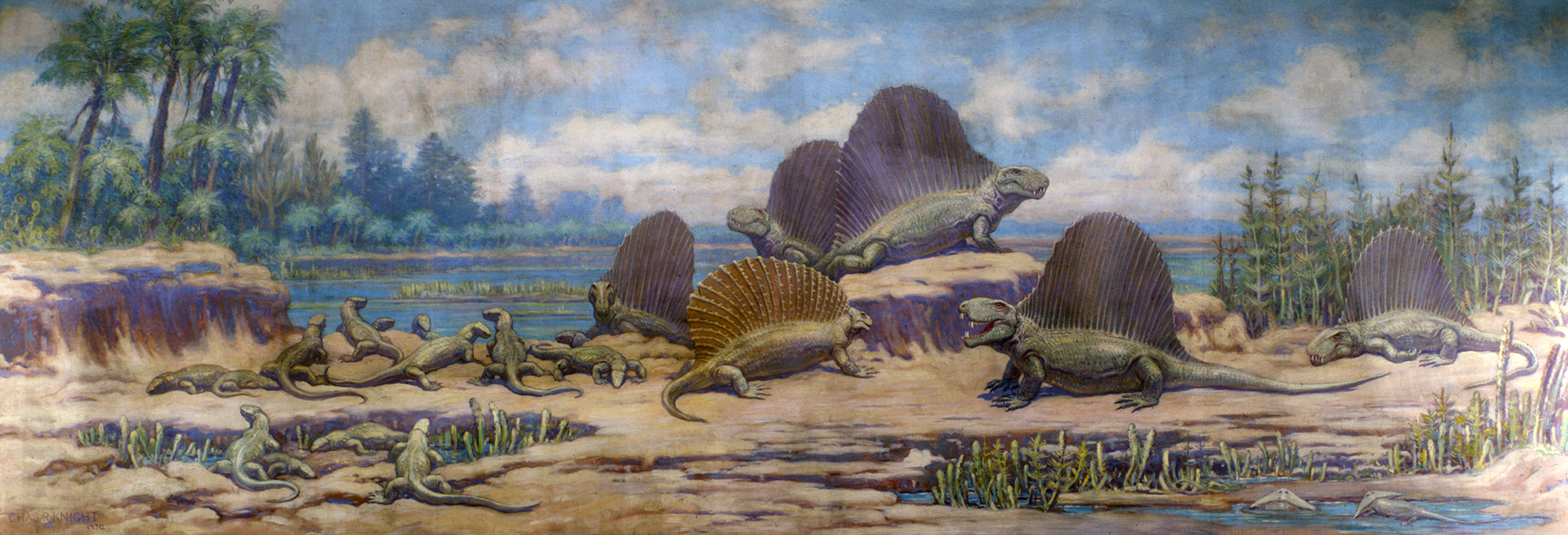
Dimetrodon, Edaphosaurus, Casea and Diplocaulus from the Permian (1930)

==== Mesozoic ====
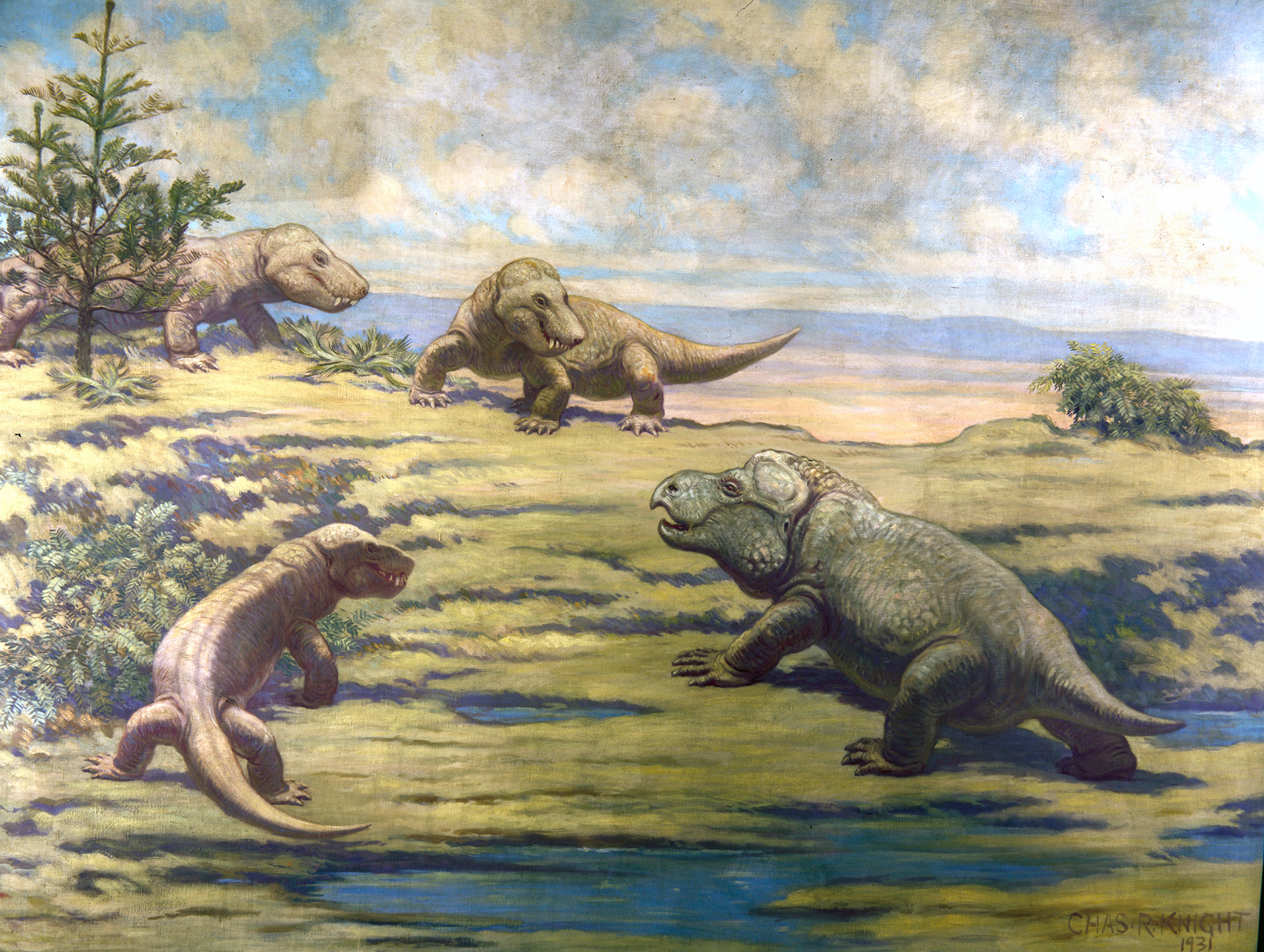
Cynognathus and Kannemeyeria from the Triassic

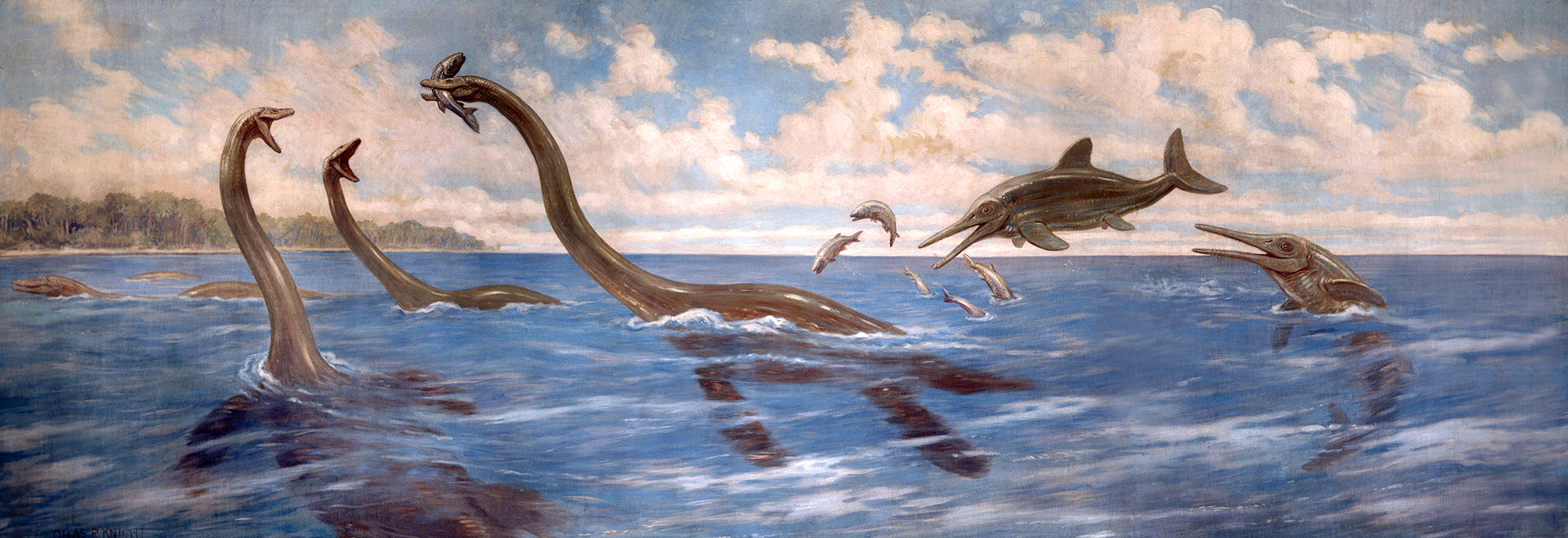
Plesiosaurs and Stenopterygius from the Jurassic

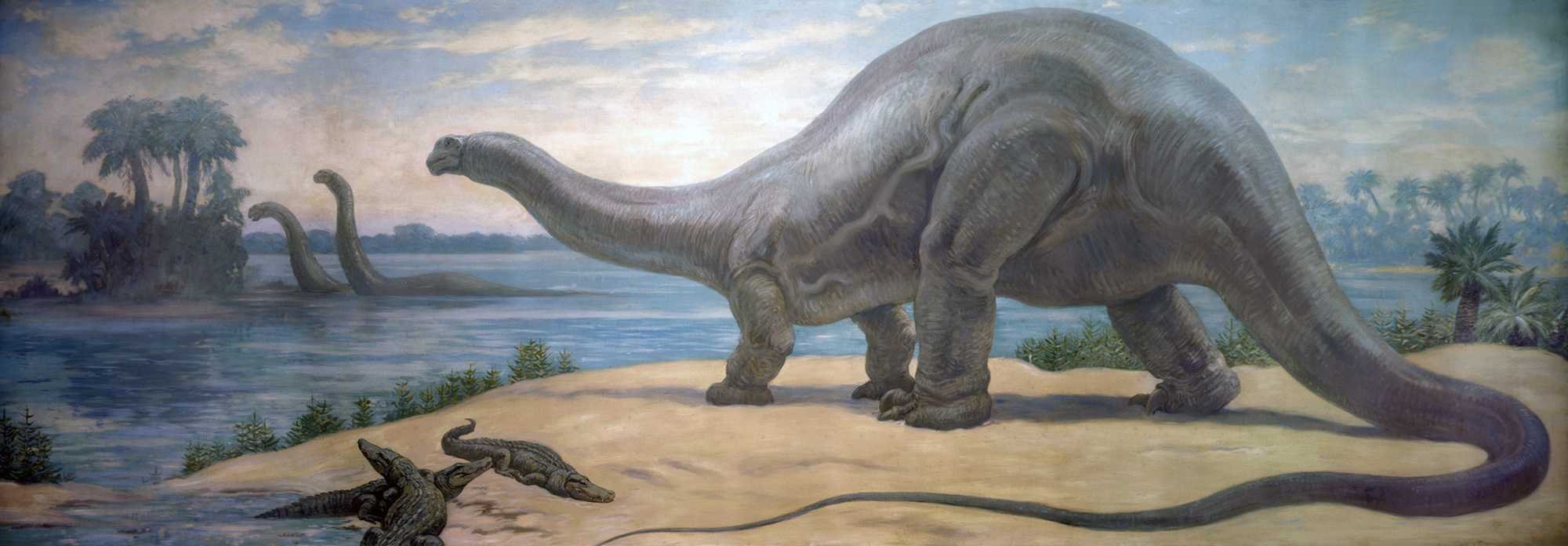
Brontosaurus from the Jurassic (1930)

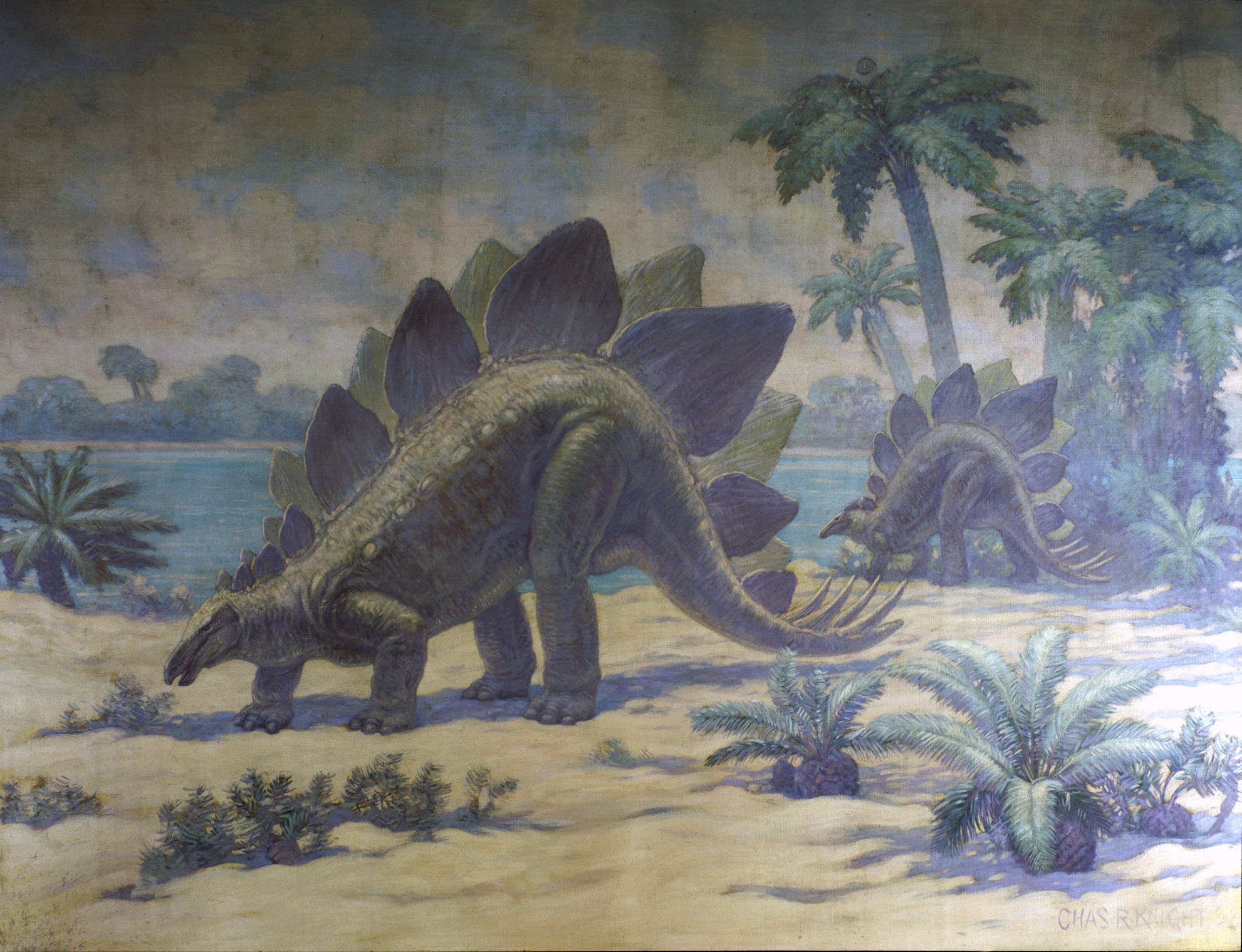
Stegosaurus from the Jurassic (1927)

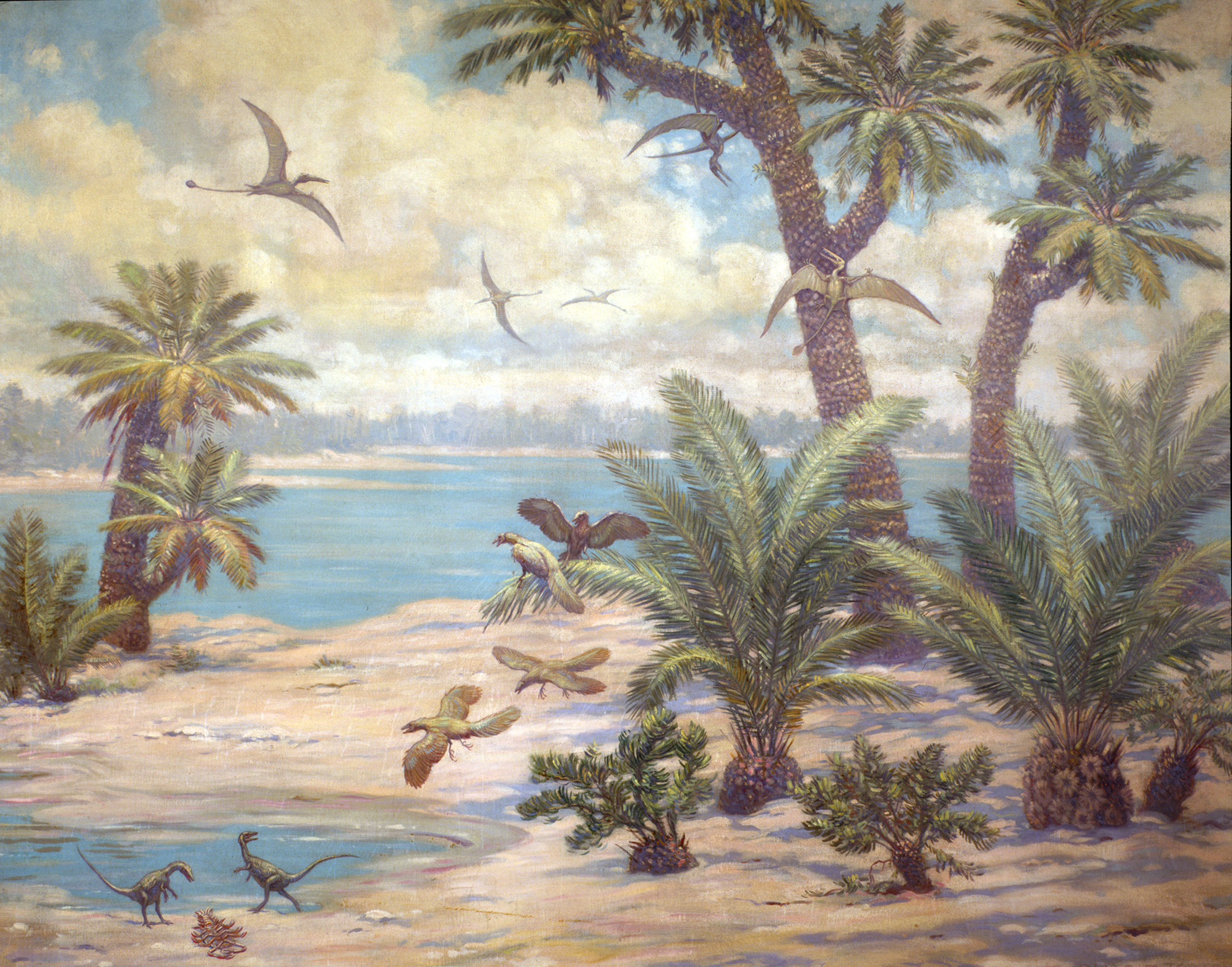
Archaeopteryx, Compsognathus, and Rhamphorhynchus from coastal Jurassic Europe

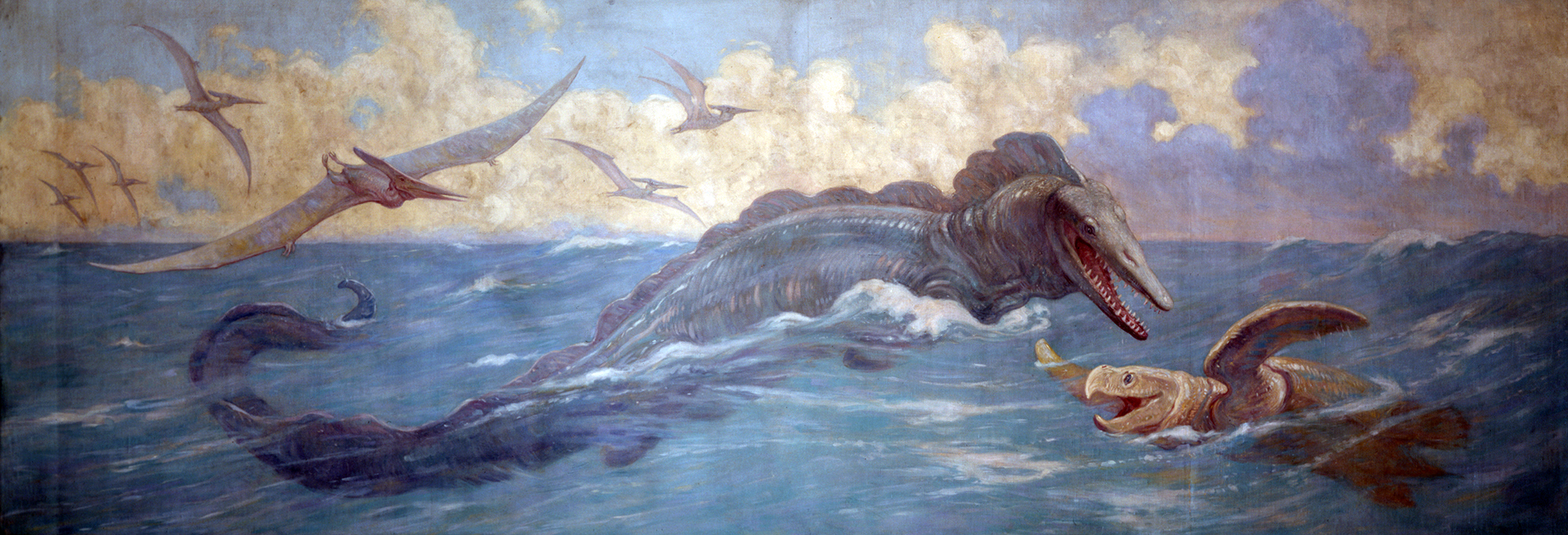
Tylosaurus, Protostega, and Pteranodon from Late Cretaceous seas

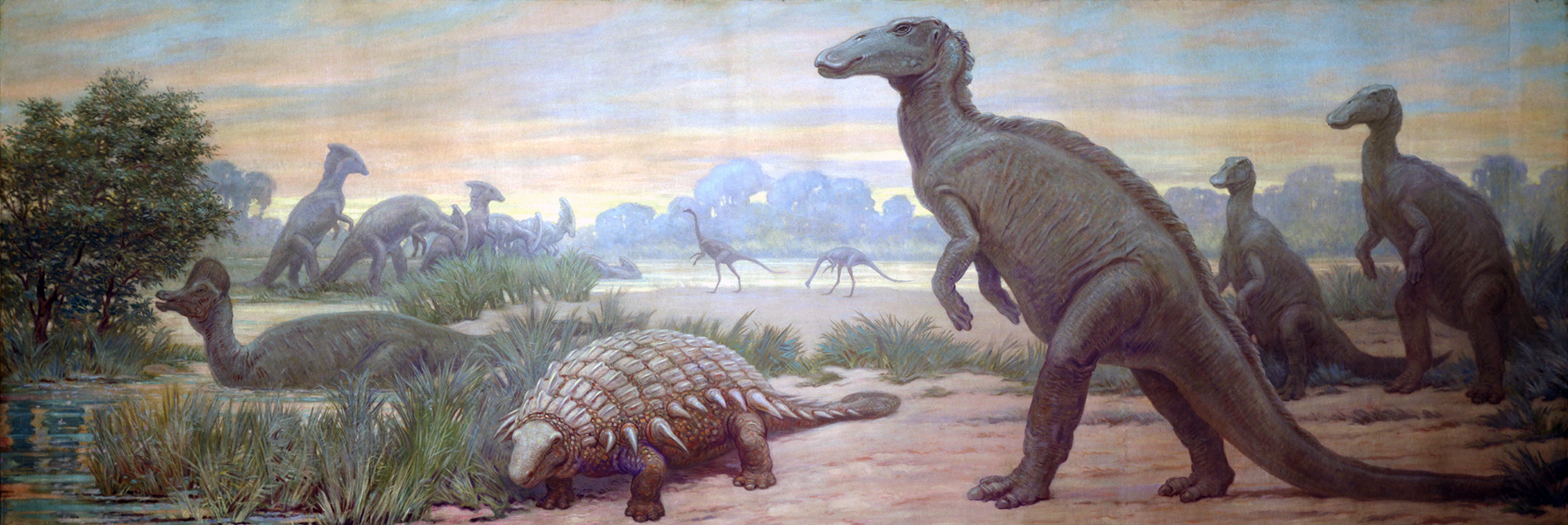
Corythosaurus, Parasaurolophus, Palaeoscincus, Struthiomimus, and Edmontosaurus from the Late Cretaceous

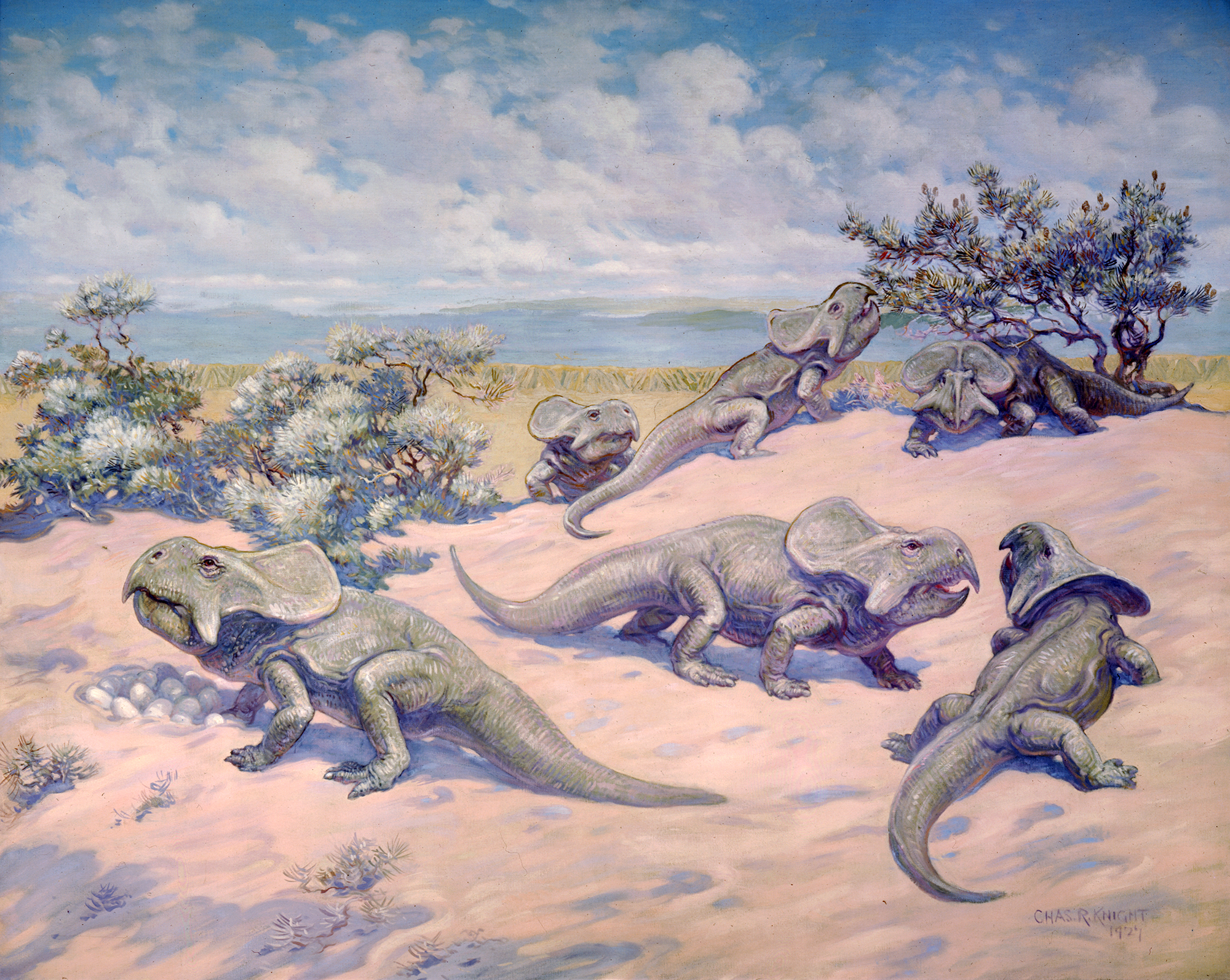
Nesting Protoceratops from Late Cretaceous Mongolia

==== Cenozoic ====
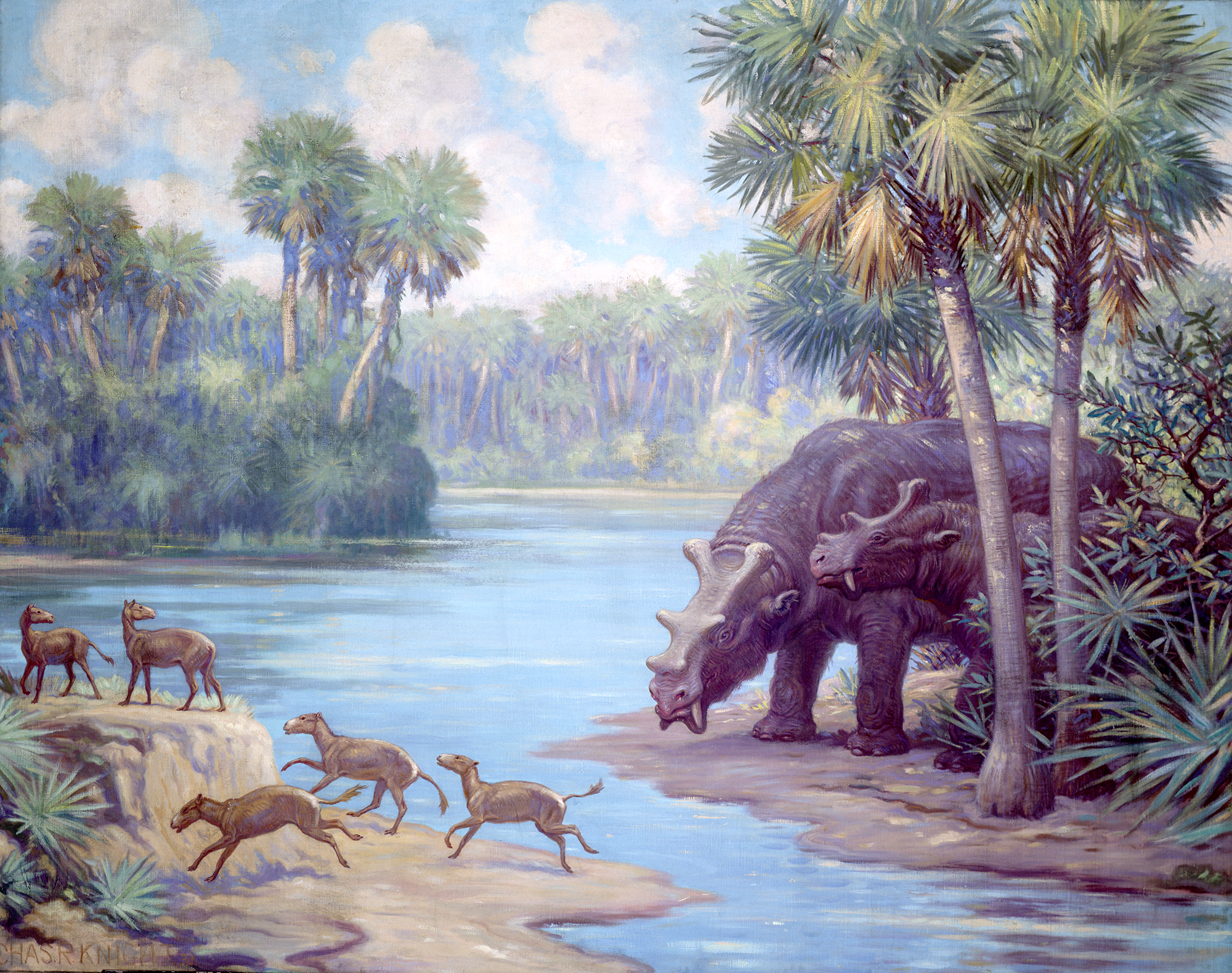
Uintatherium and Orohippus from the Eocene

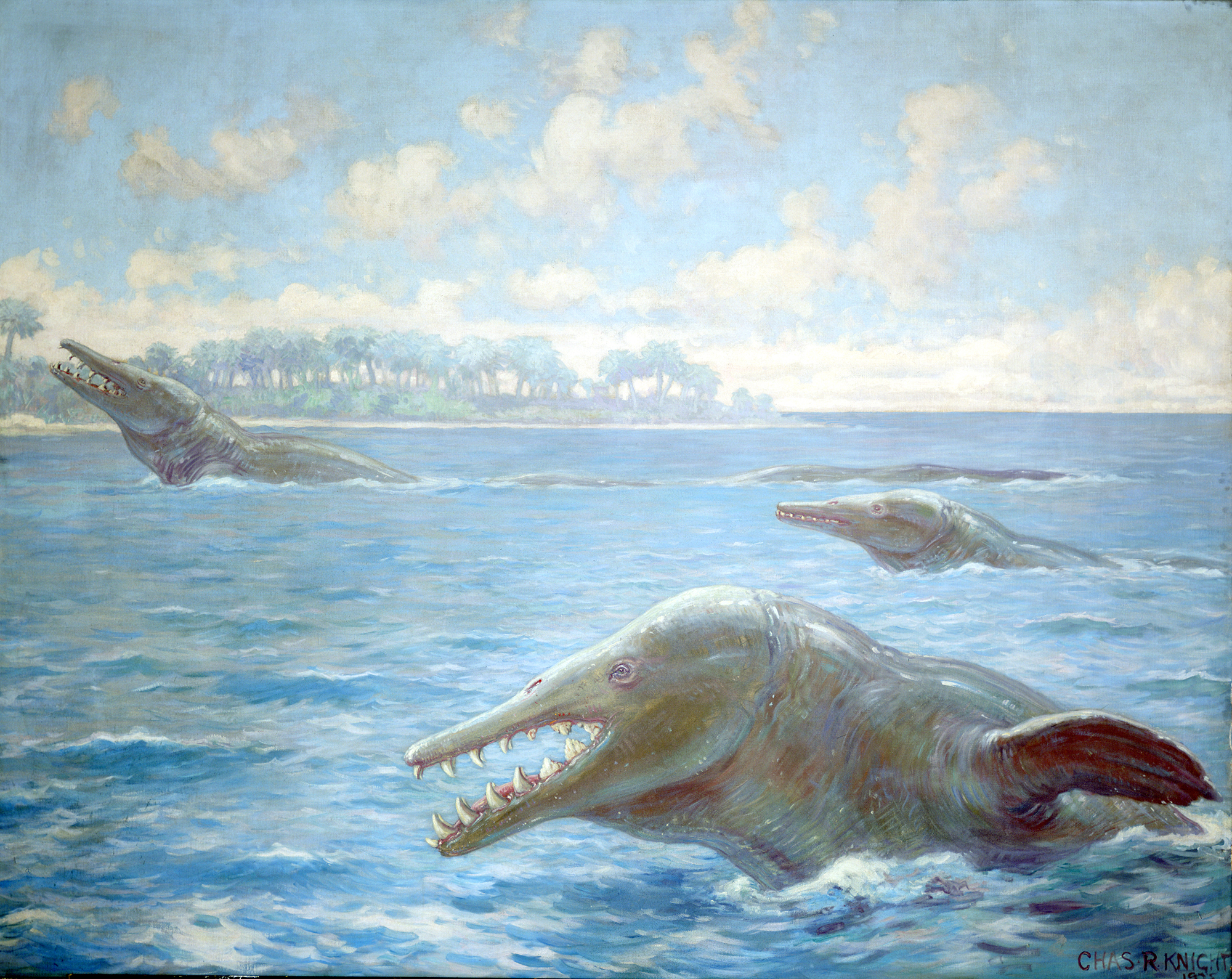
Zeuglodon from the Eocene

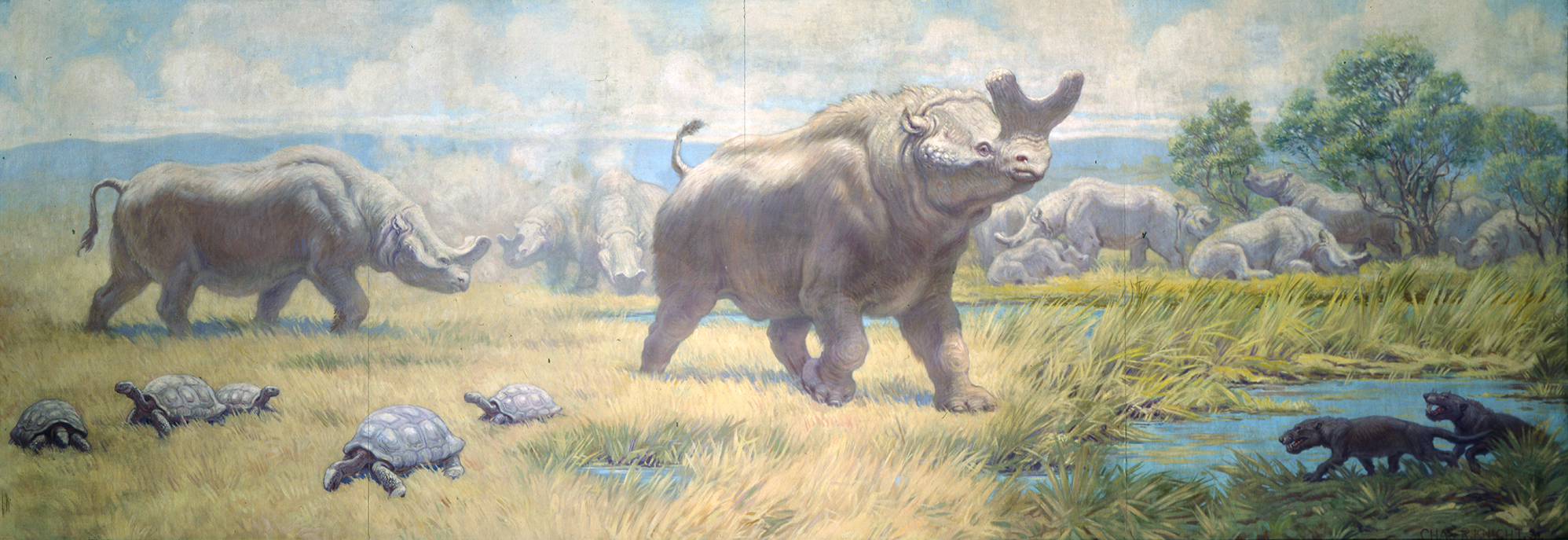
Brontotherium, Hyaenodon, and Stylemys from the Oligocene

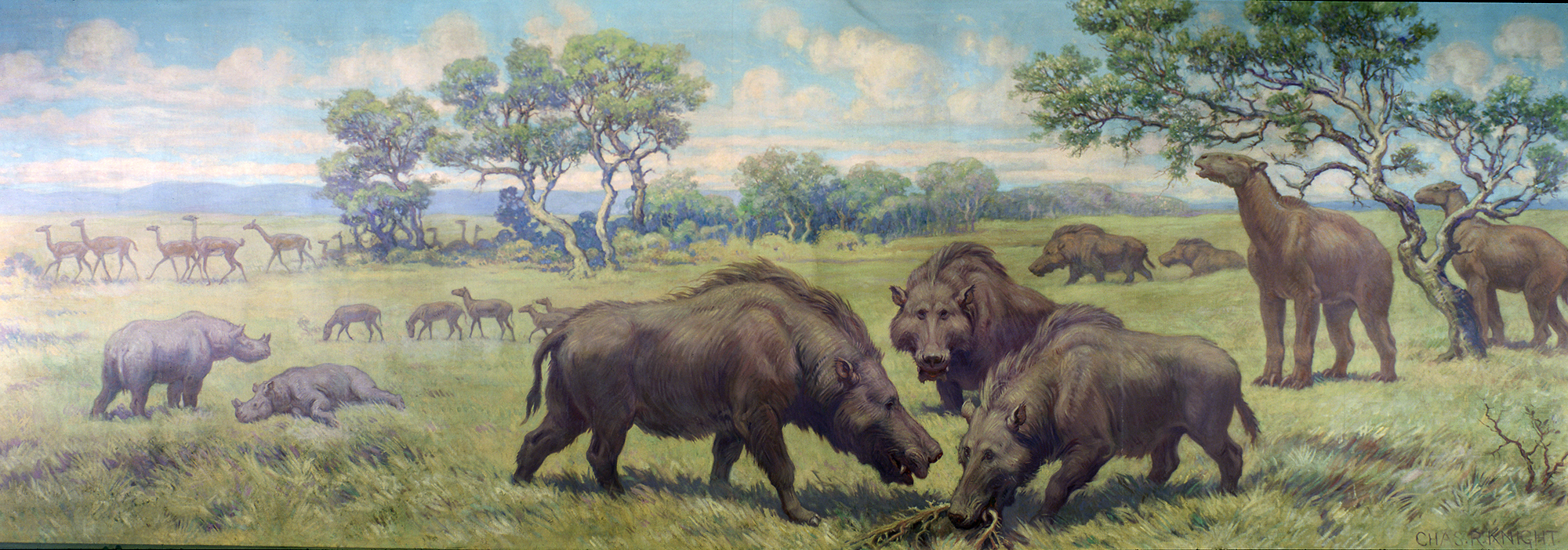
Oxydactylus, Menoceras, Parahippus, Dinohyus, and Moropus from the Miocene

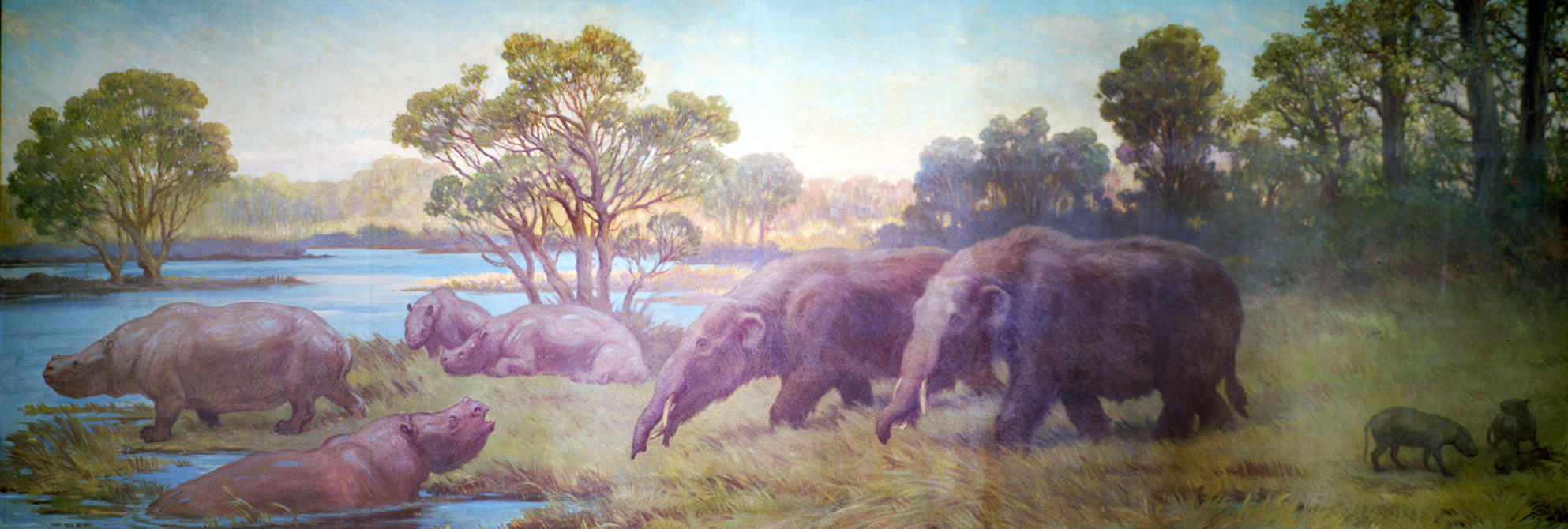
Teleoceras, Trilophodon, and oreodonts from the Pliocene

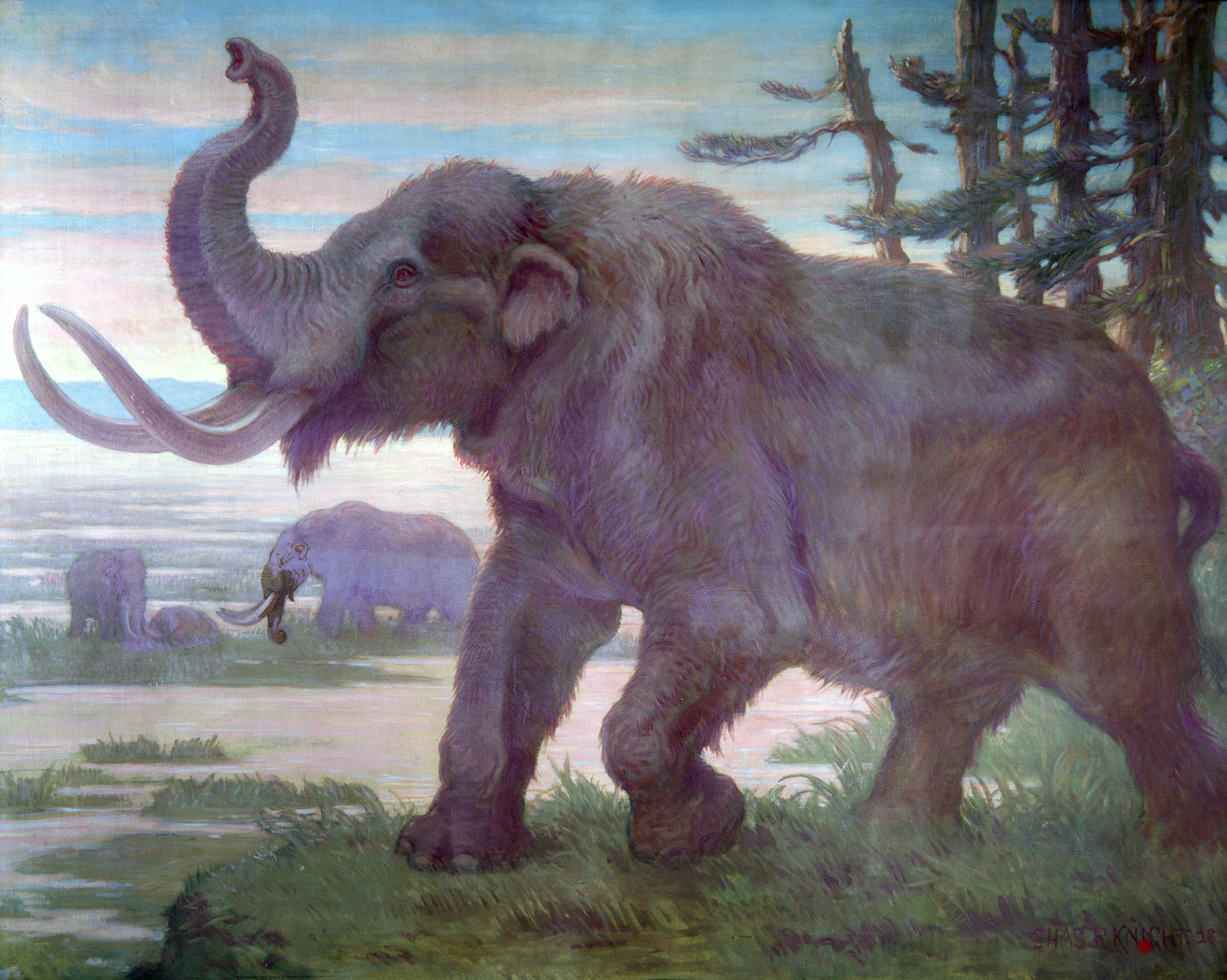
American mastodon from the Pleistocene

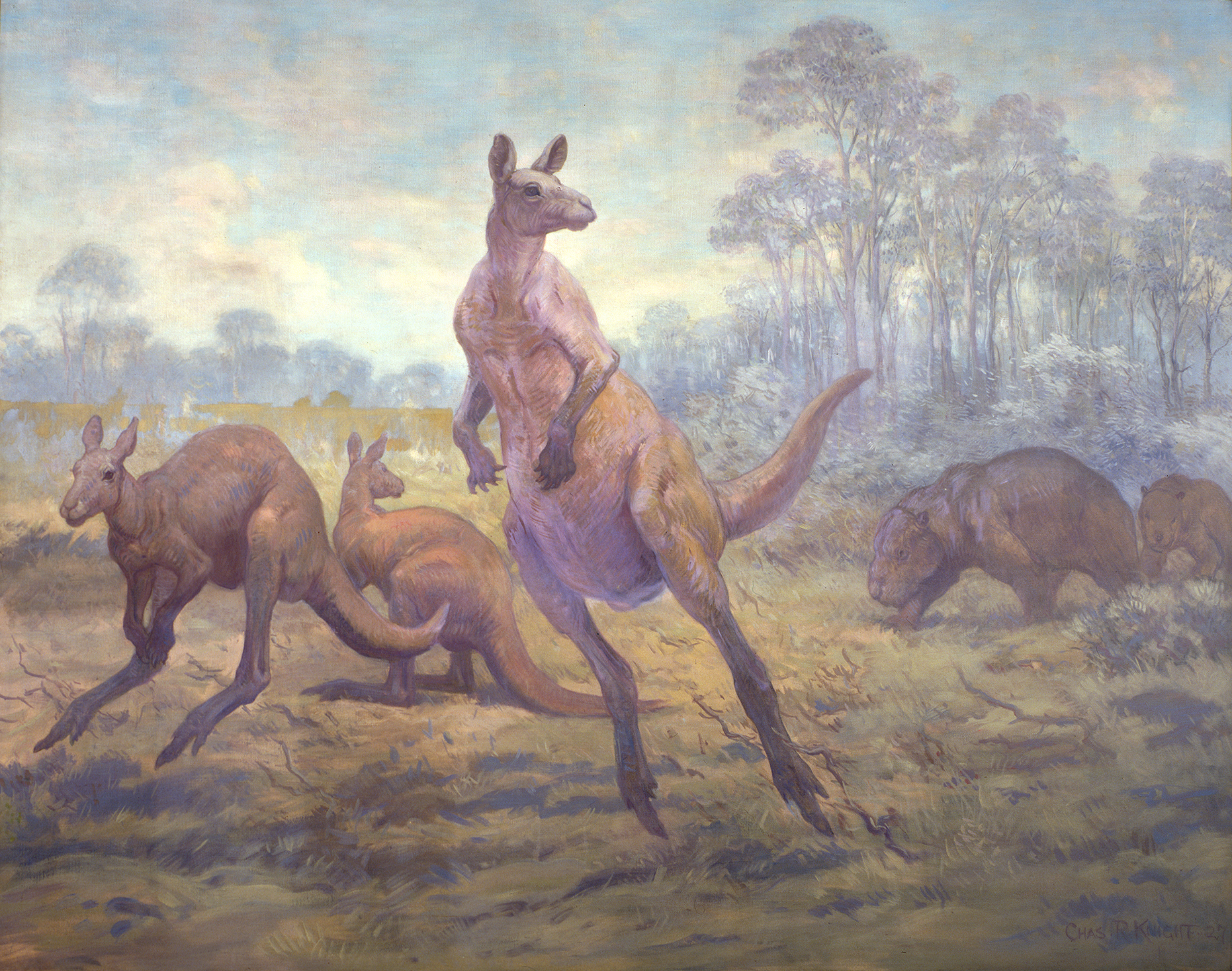
Palorchestes and Diprotodon from the Pleistocene of Australia

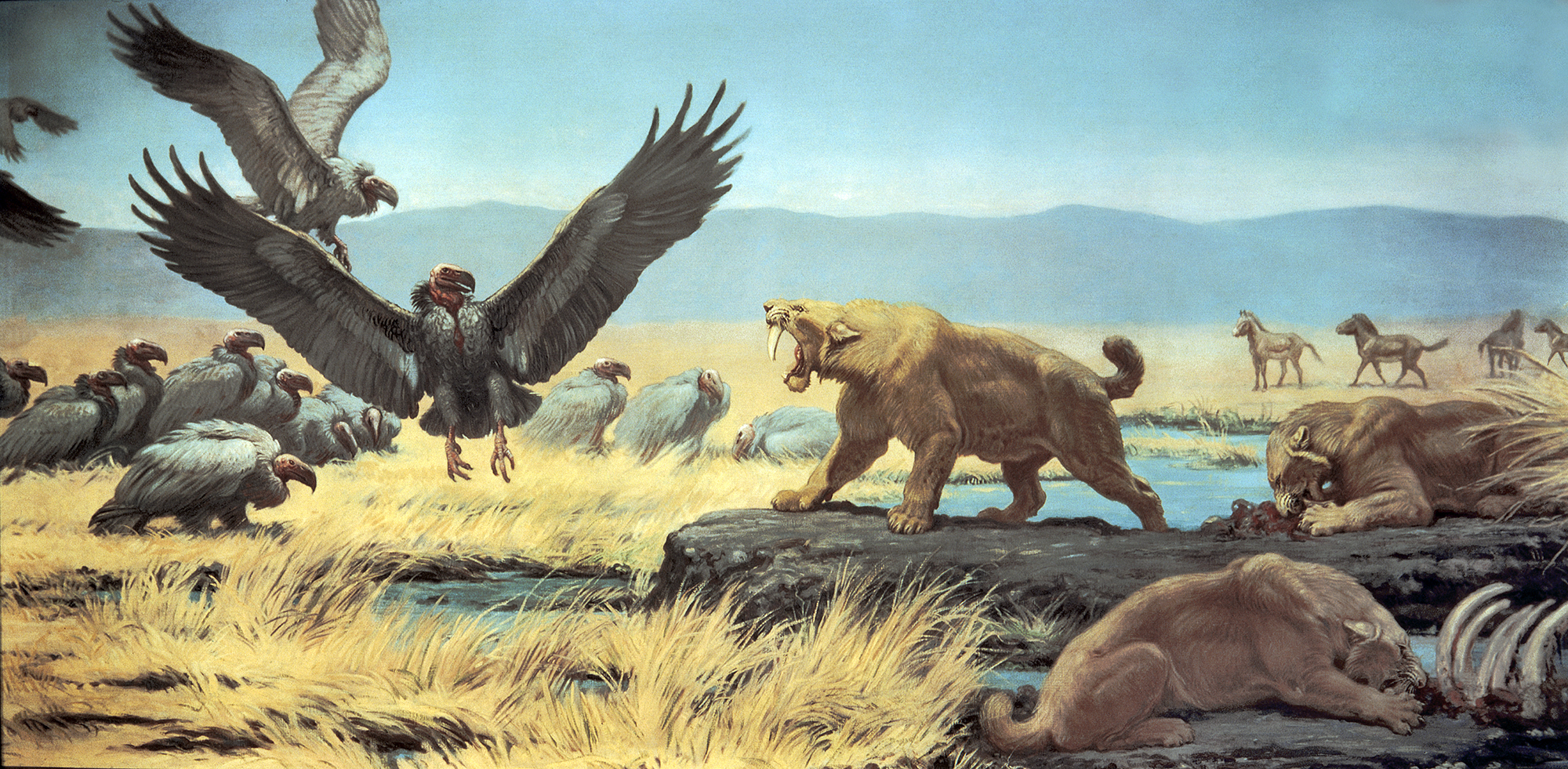
Rancho La Brea Tar Pools from Pleistocene California

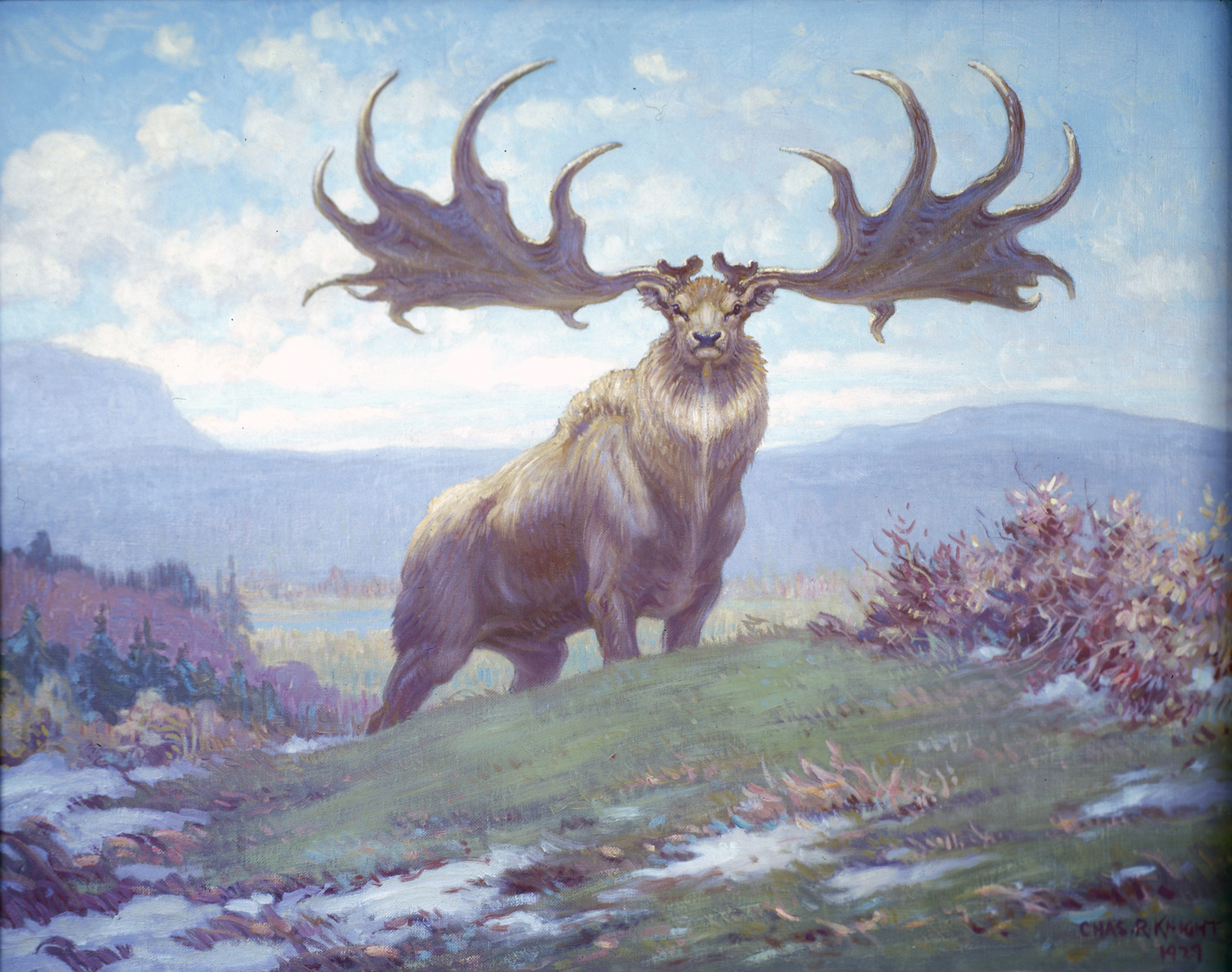
Megaloceros from the Pleistocene

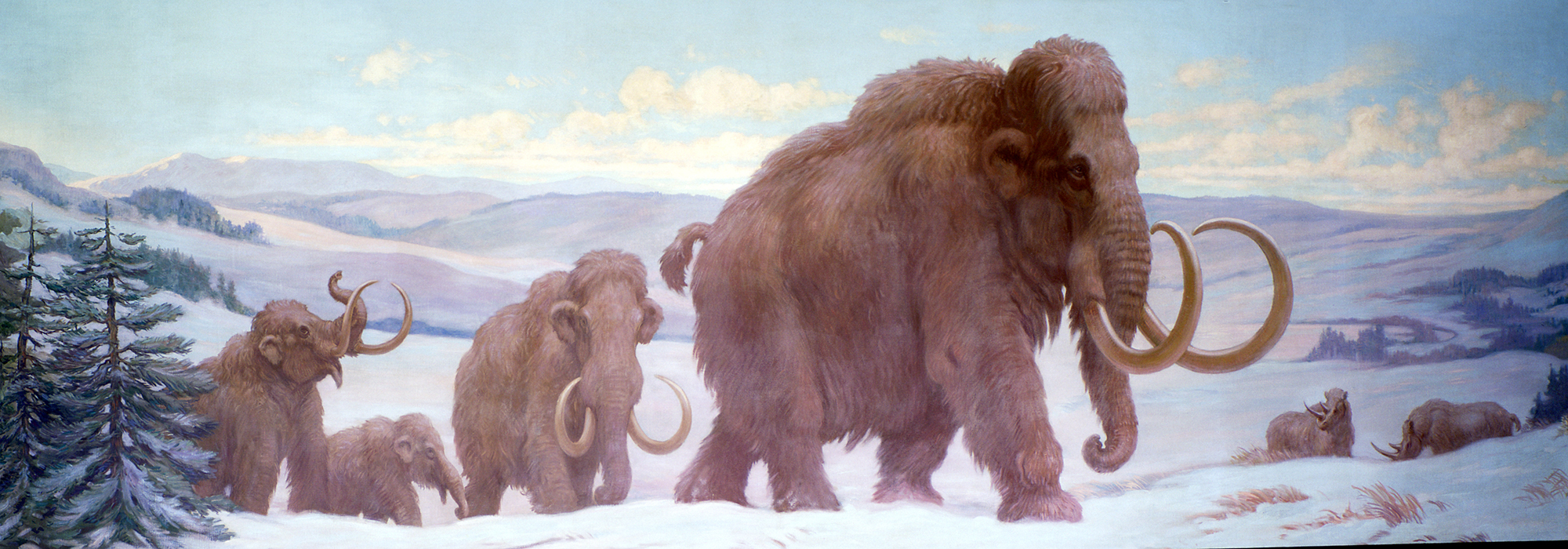
Wooly Mammoths from the Pleistocene

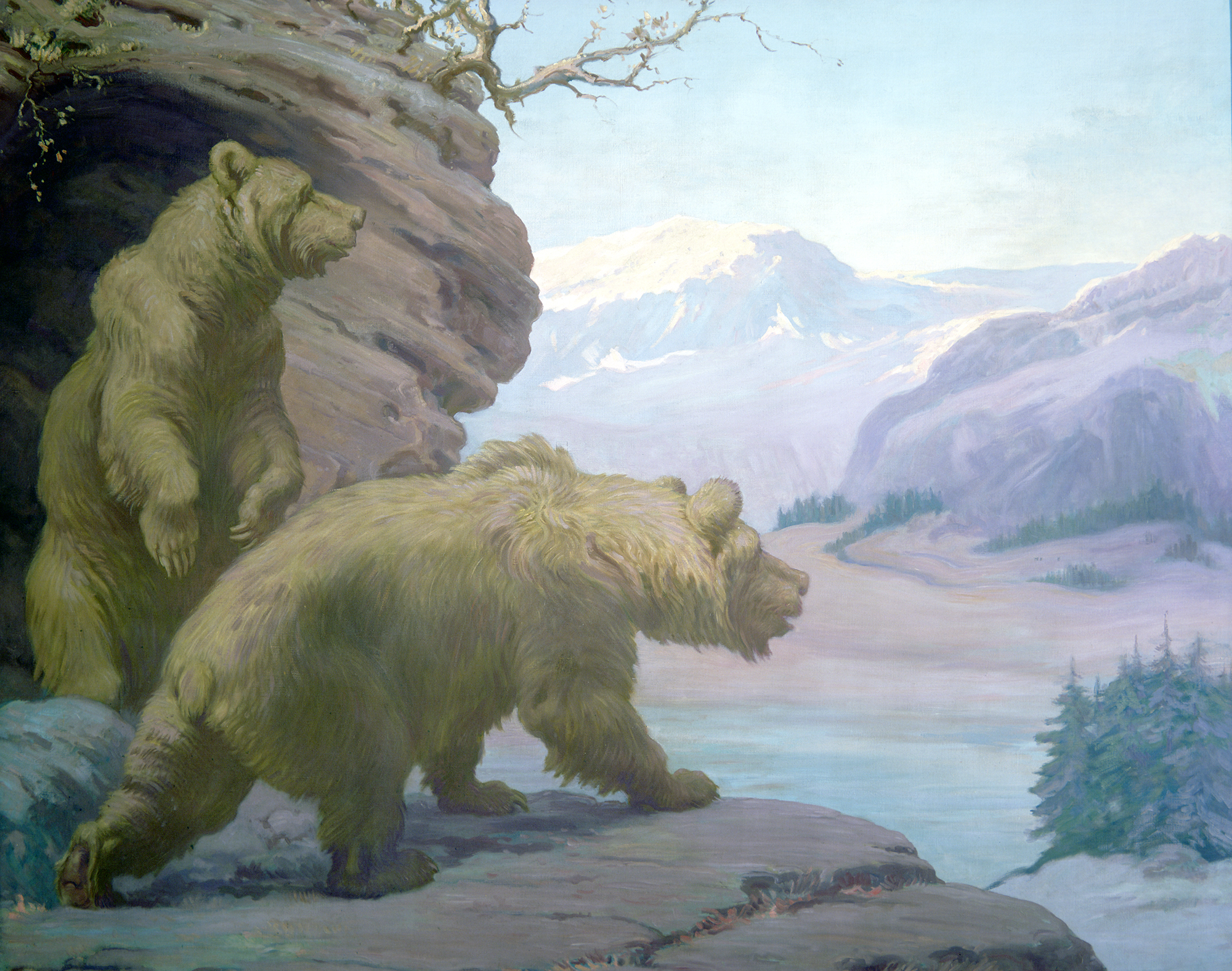
Cave Bears from the Pleistocene

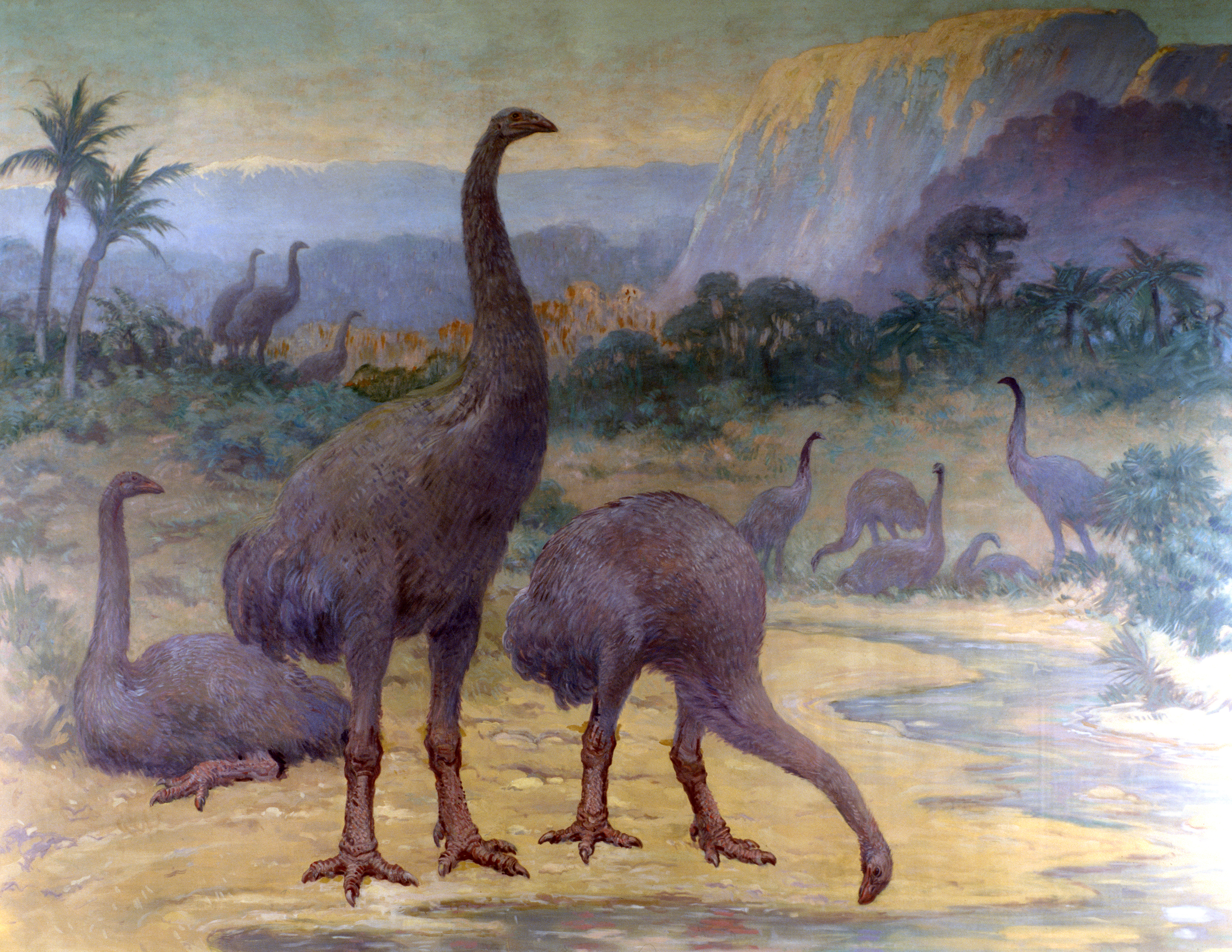
Dinornis from the Holocene

=== Other artwork ===
==== Paleozoic ====
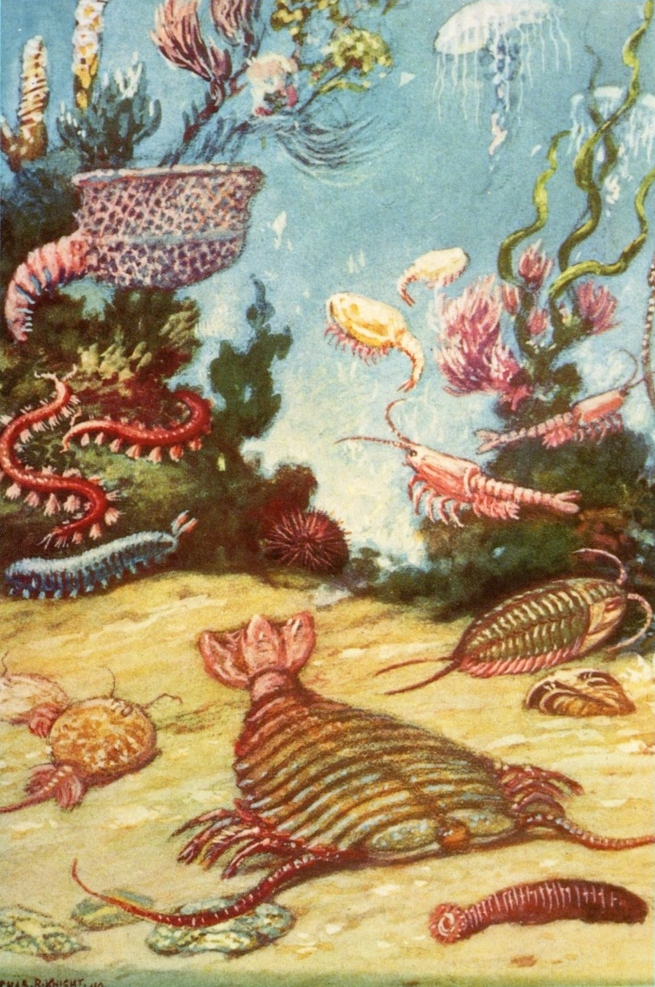
Cambrian Burgess Shale marine life

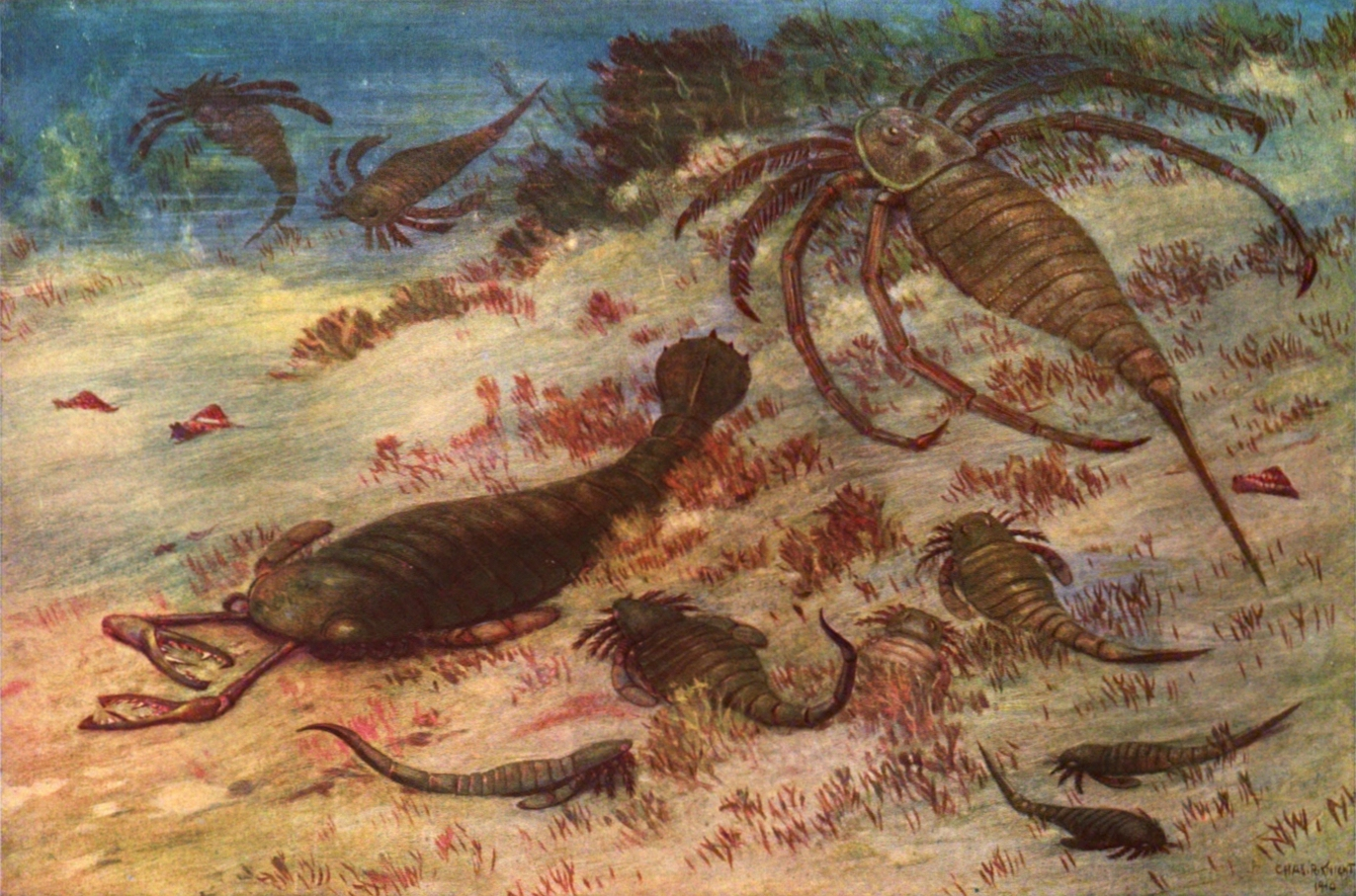
Paleozoic eurypterid sea scorpions

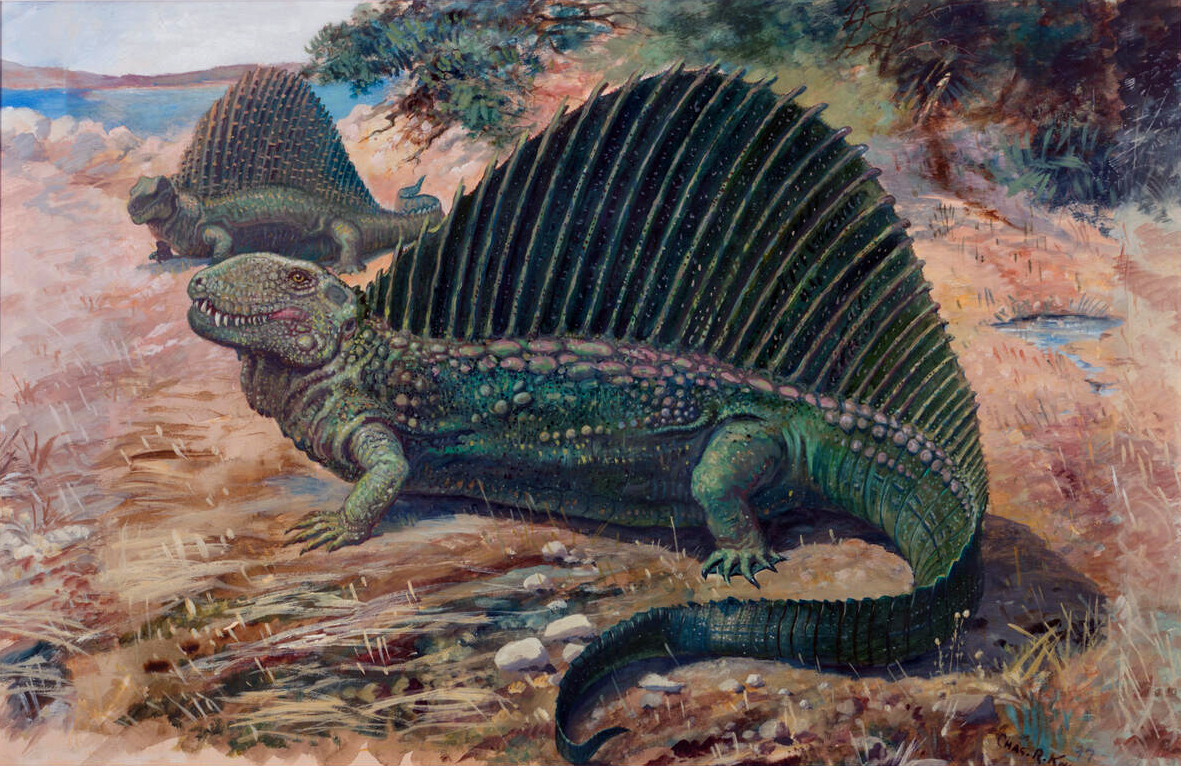
Dimetrodon

==== Mesozoic ====
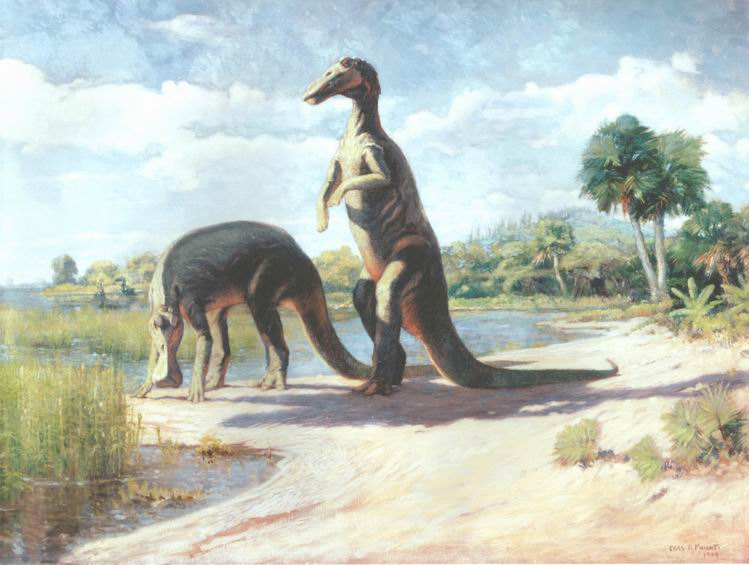
Trachodon

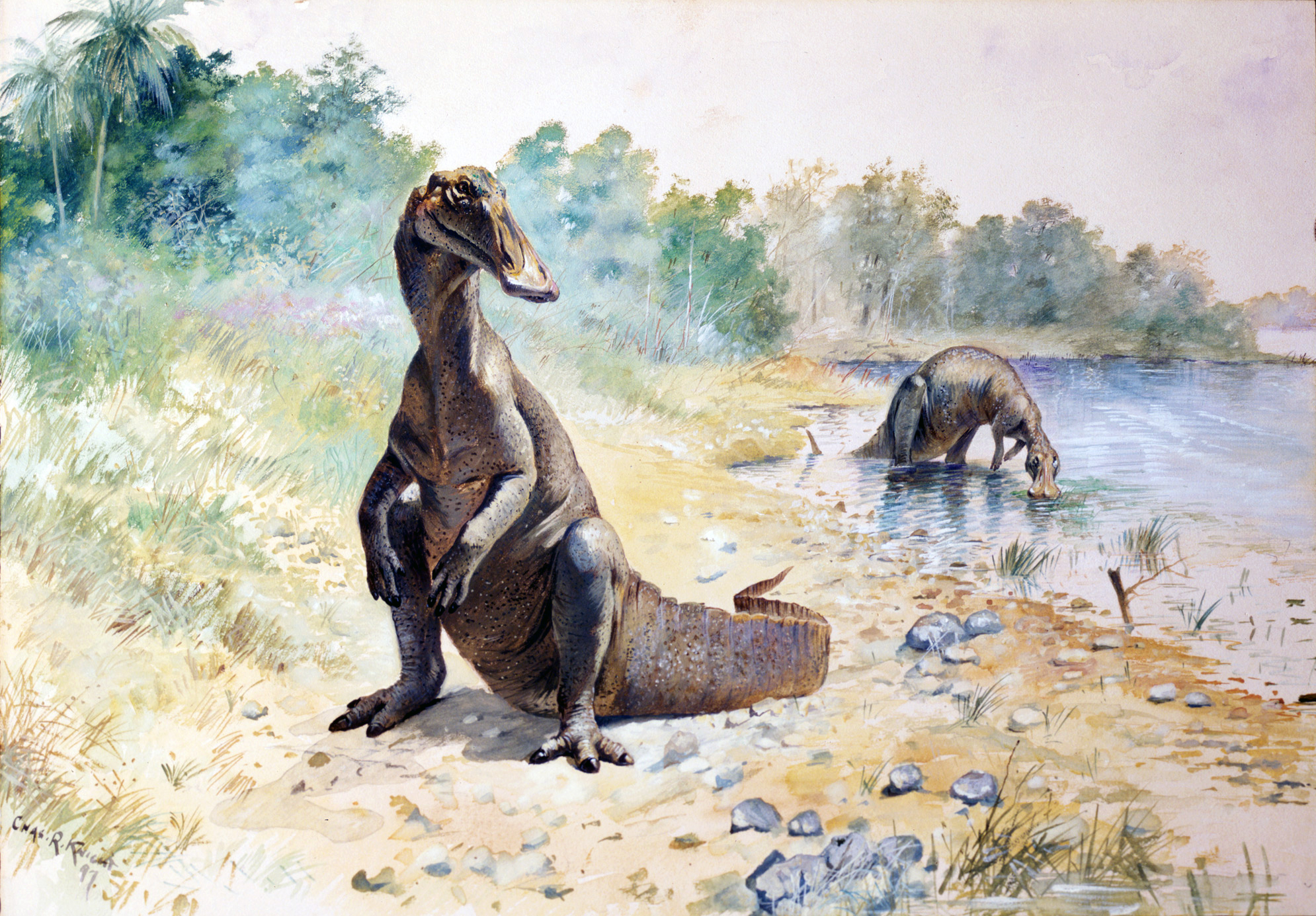
Trachodon

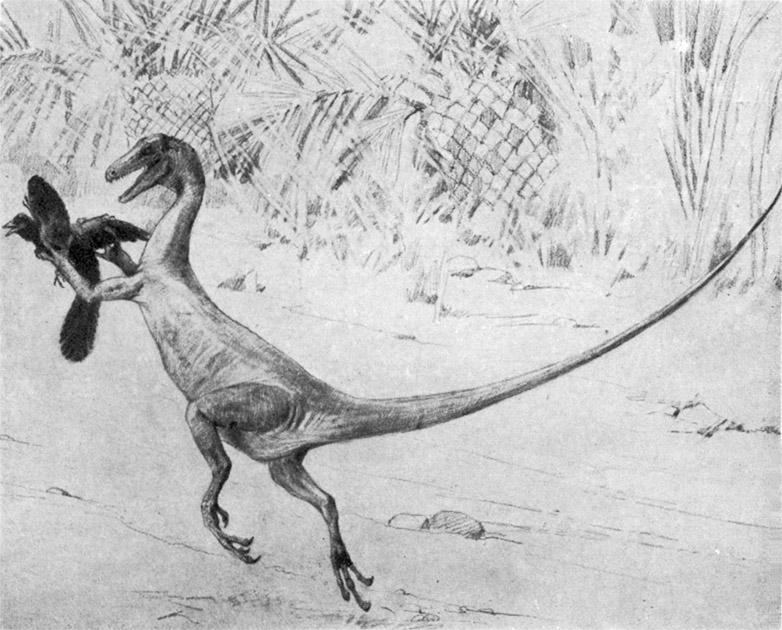
Ornitholestes

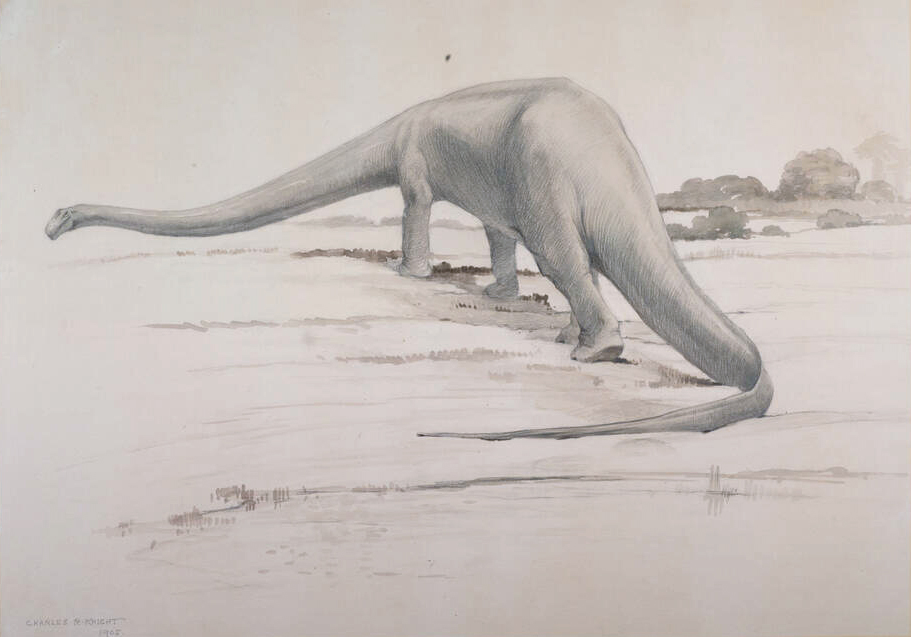
Diplodocus

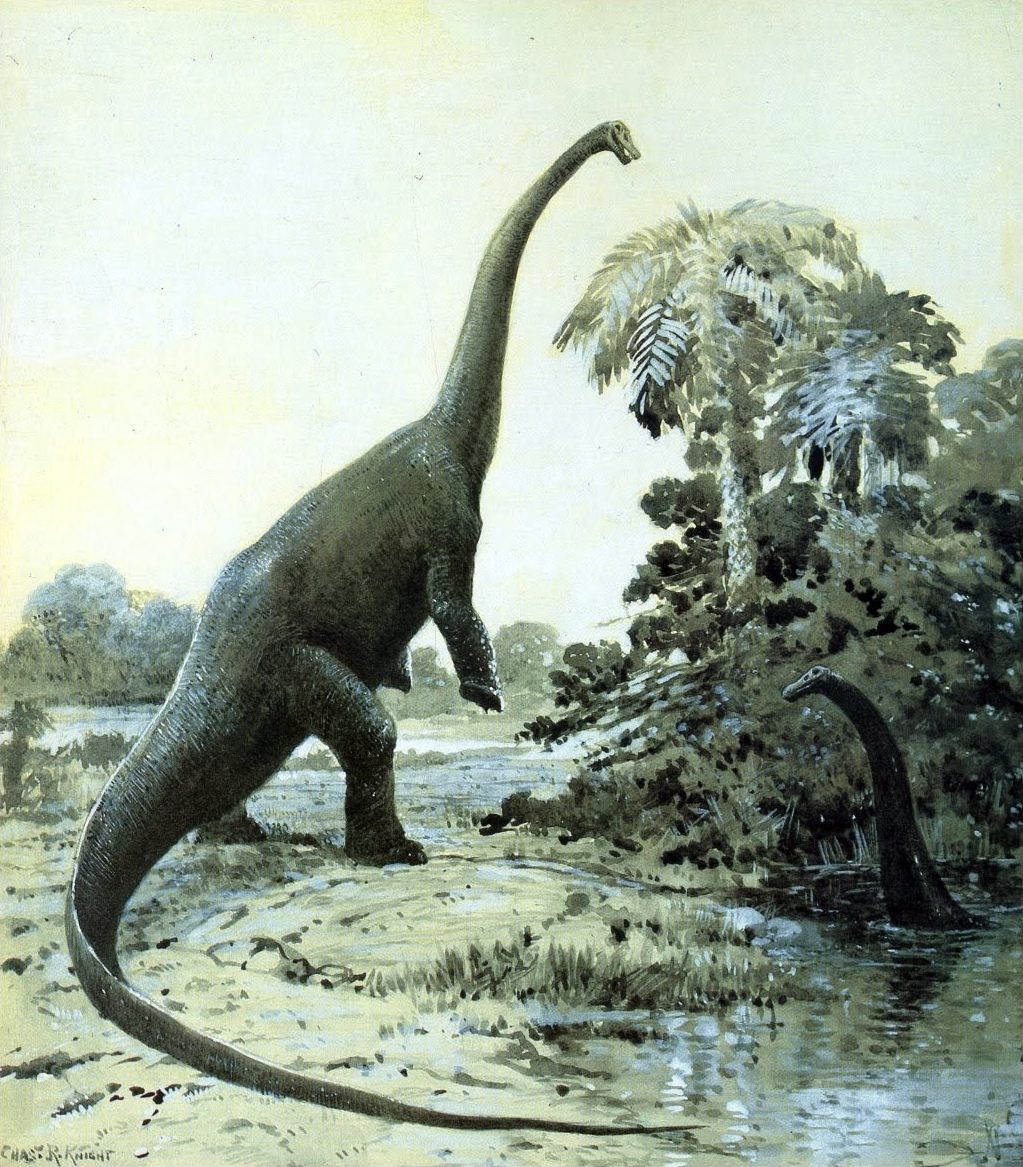
Rearing Diplodocus

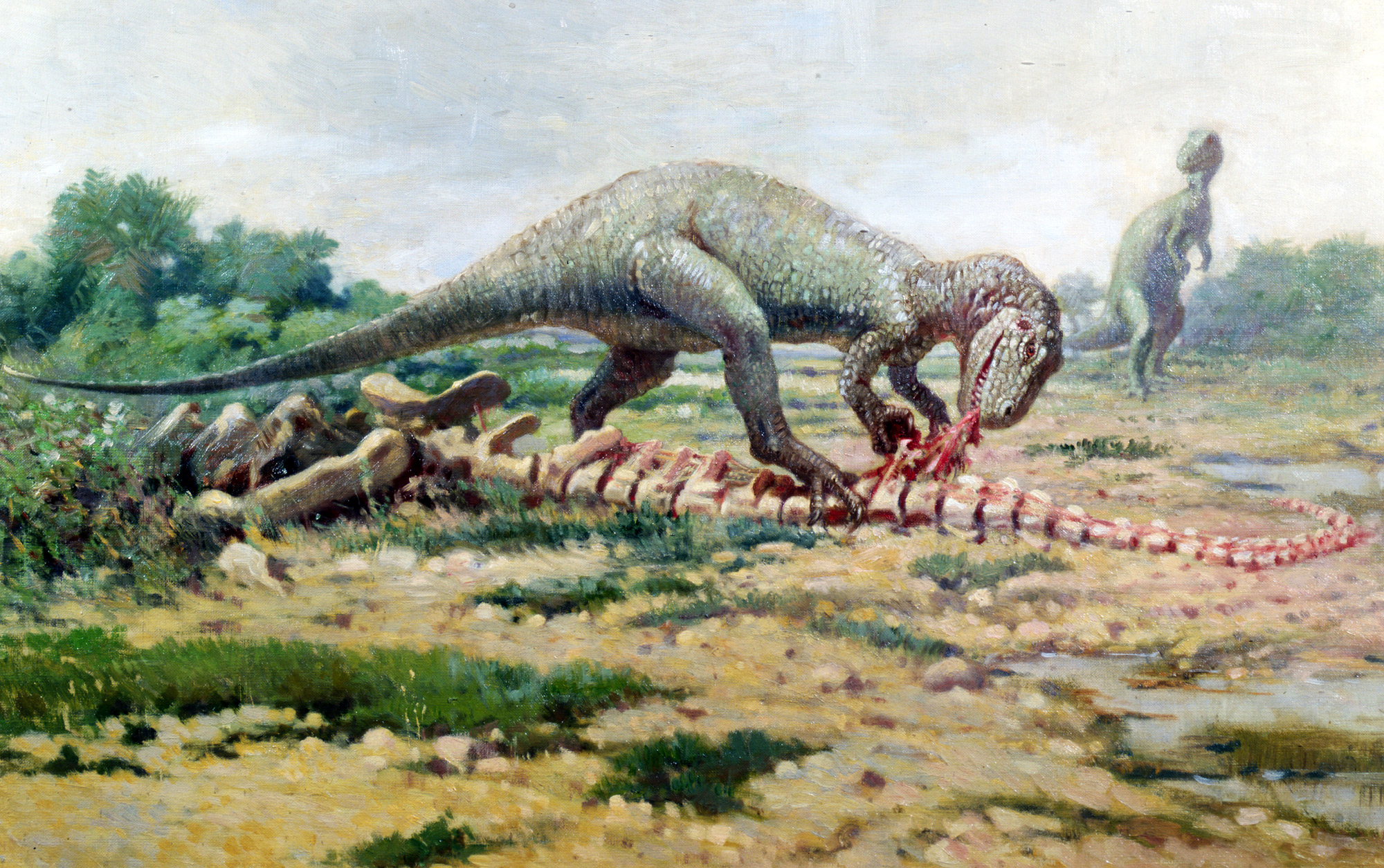
Feeding Allosaurus

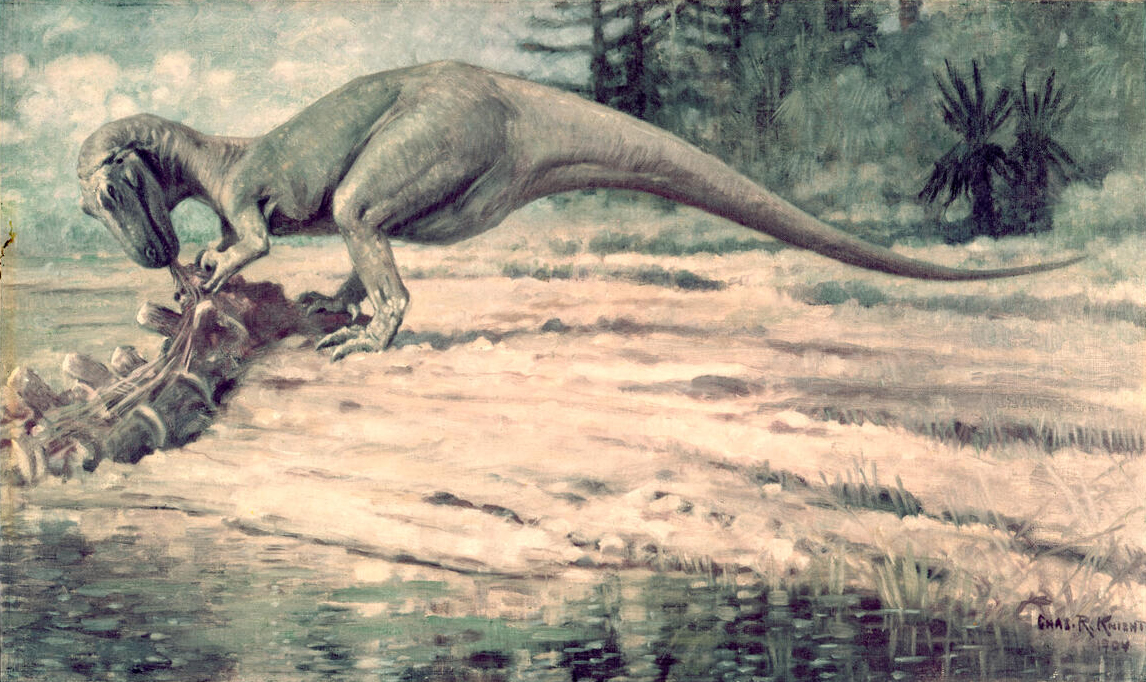
Allosaurus eating

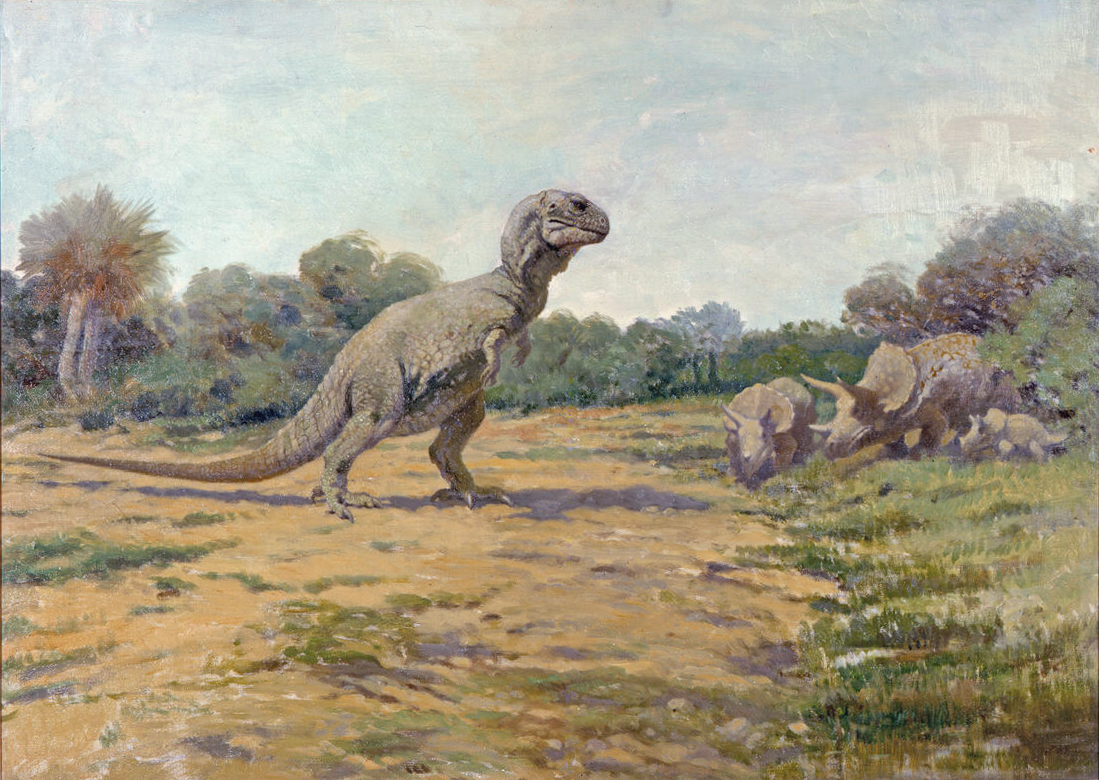
Tyrannosaurus

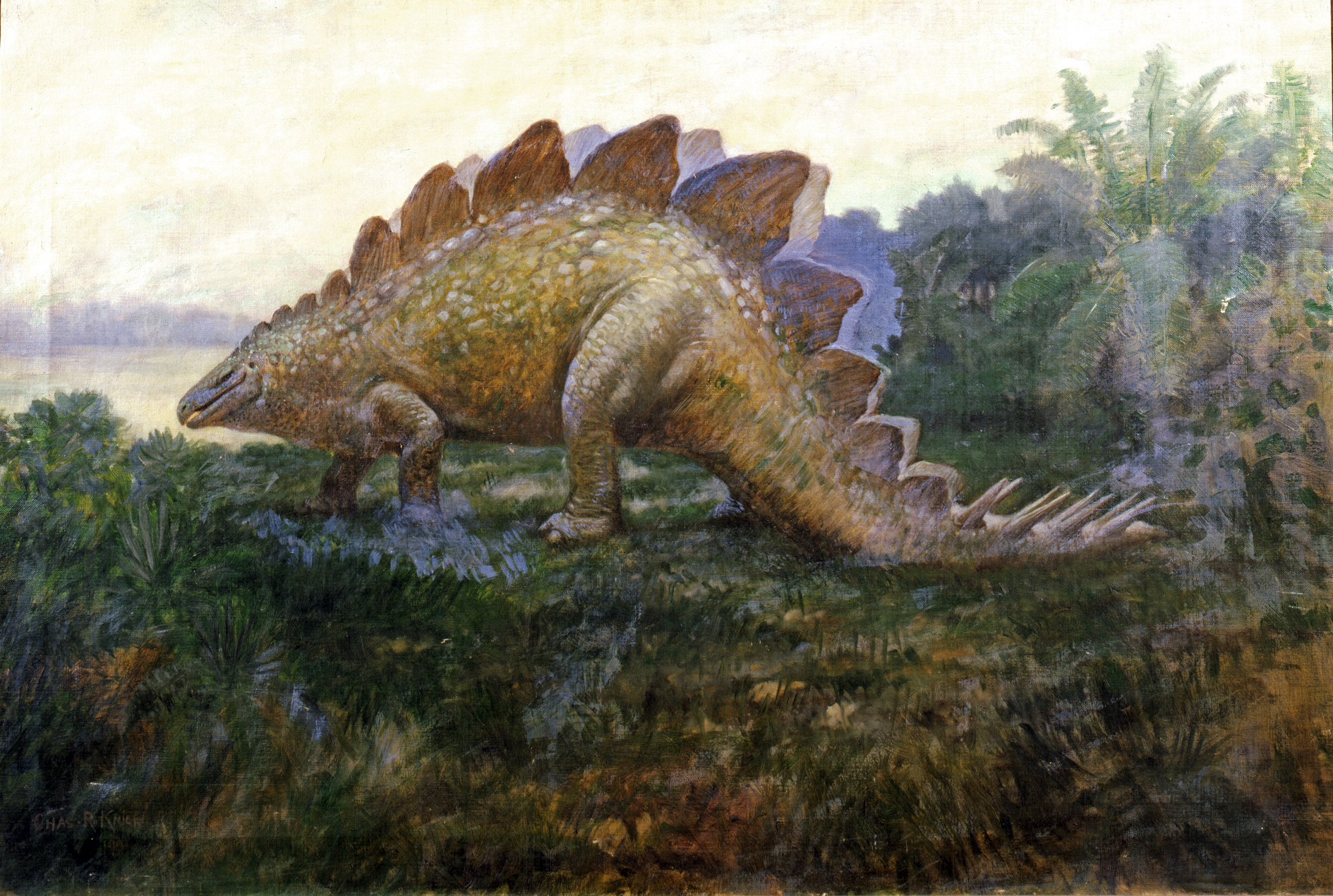
Stegosaurus

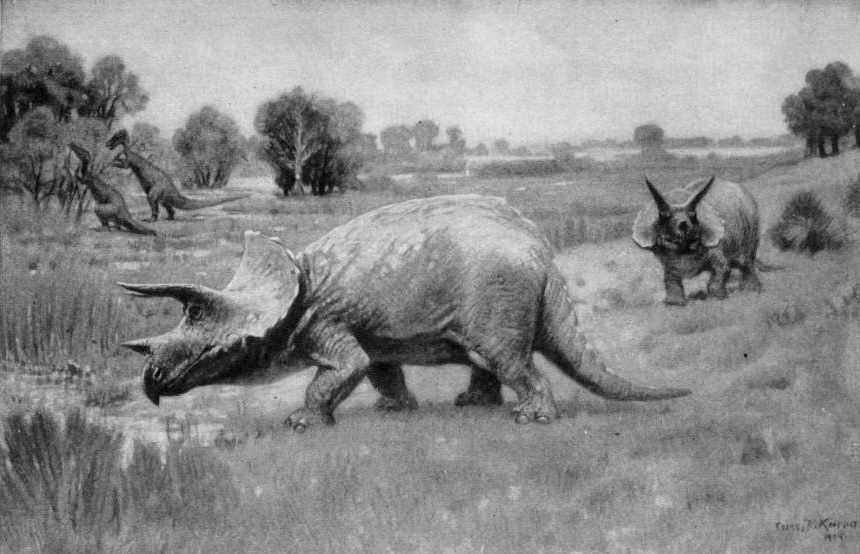
Triceratops from 1904

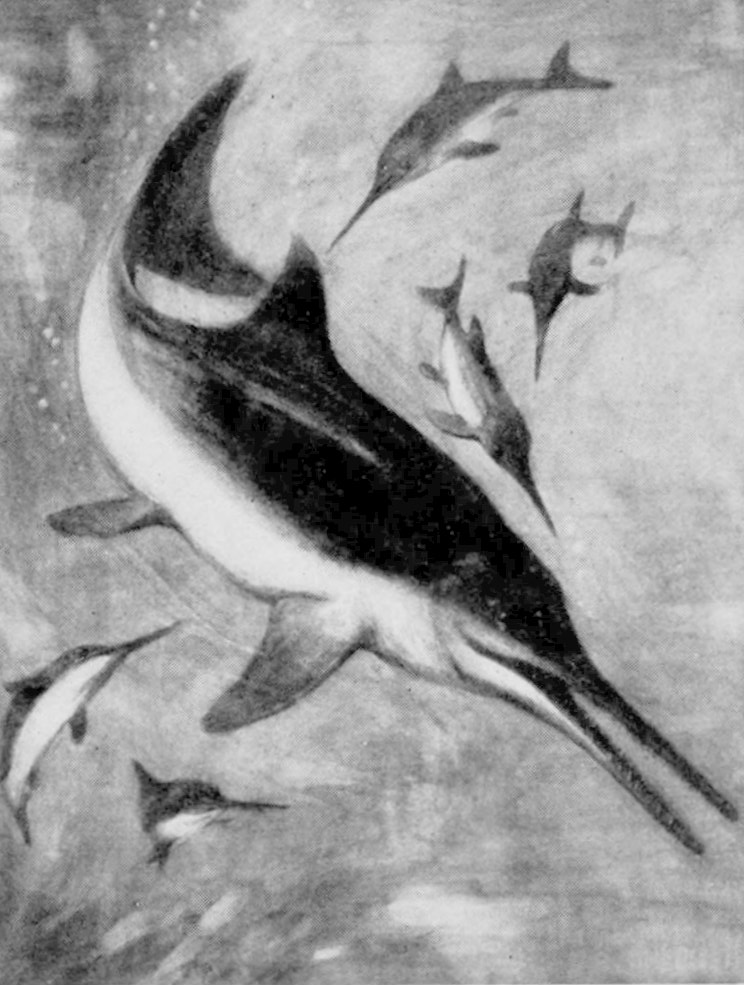
Ichthyosaur with young

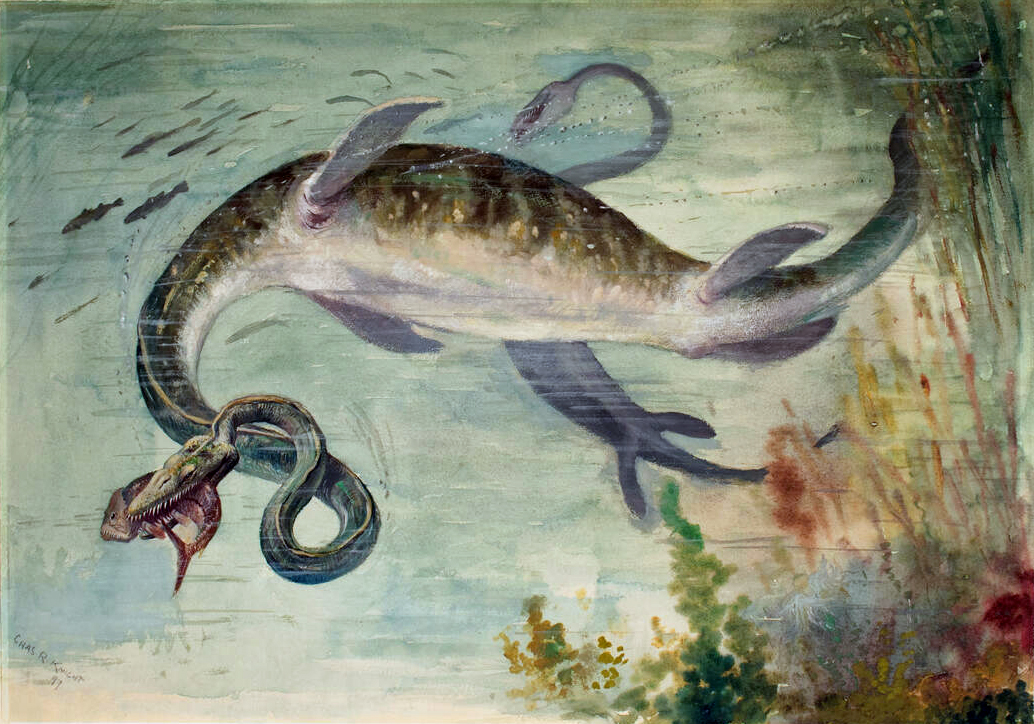
Snake-necked Elasmosaurus

==== Cenozoic ====
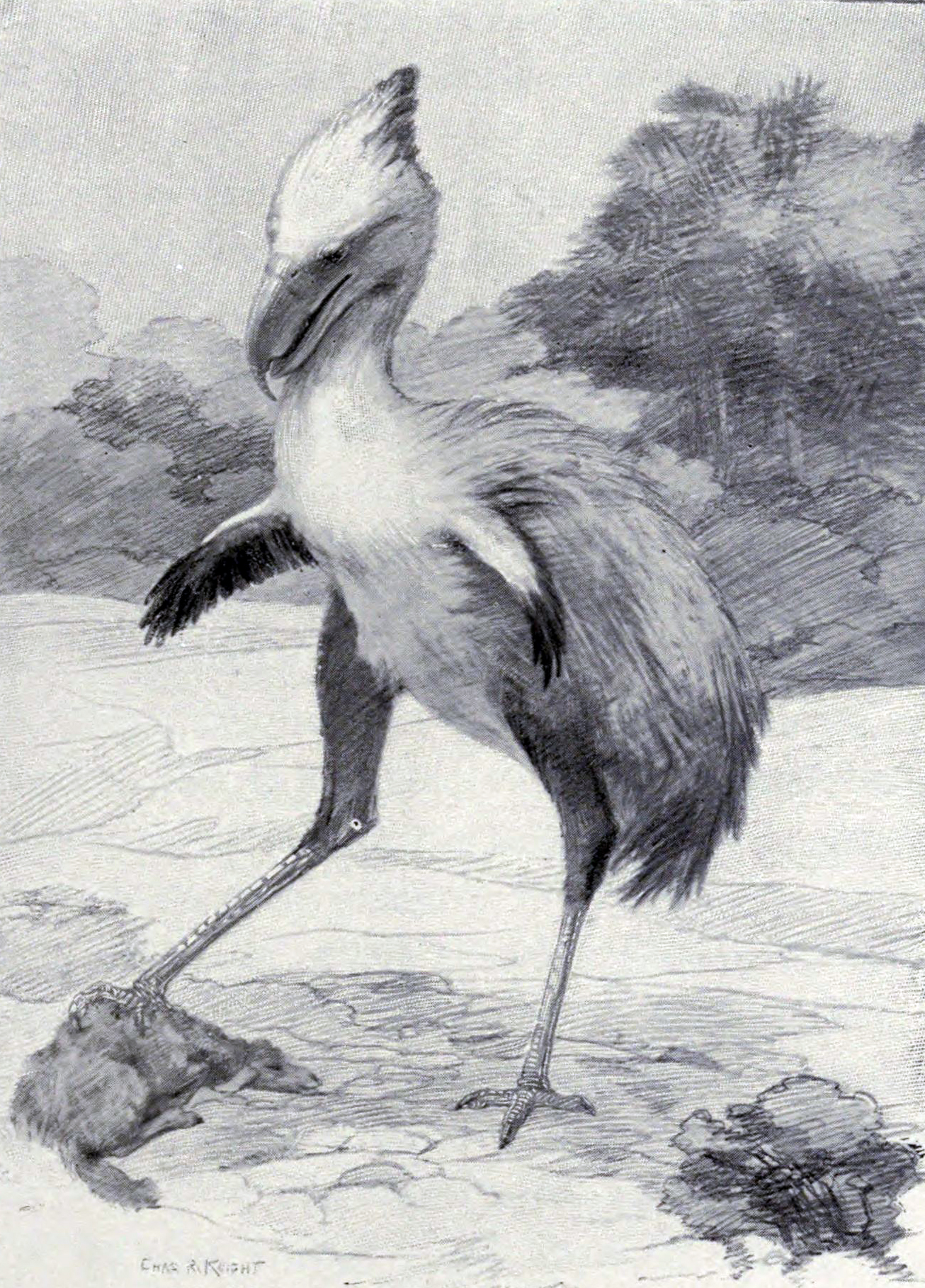
Phorusrhacos

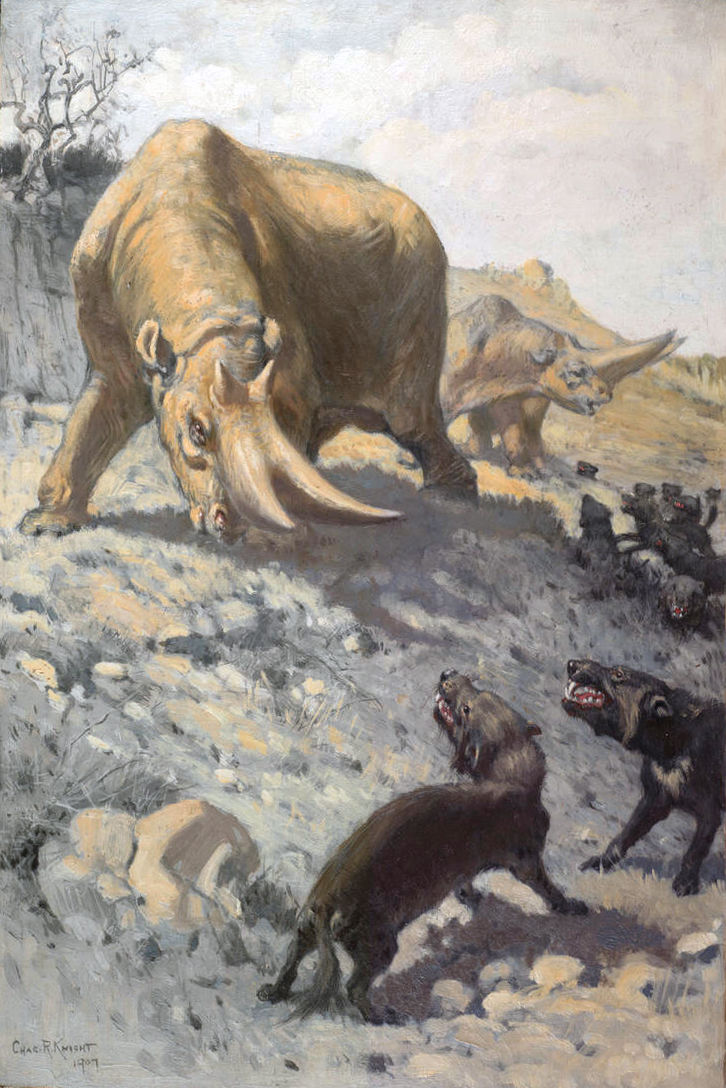
Arsinoitherium attacked by two Pterodon

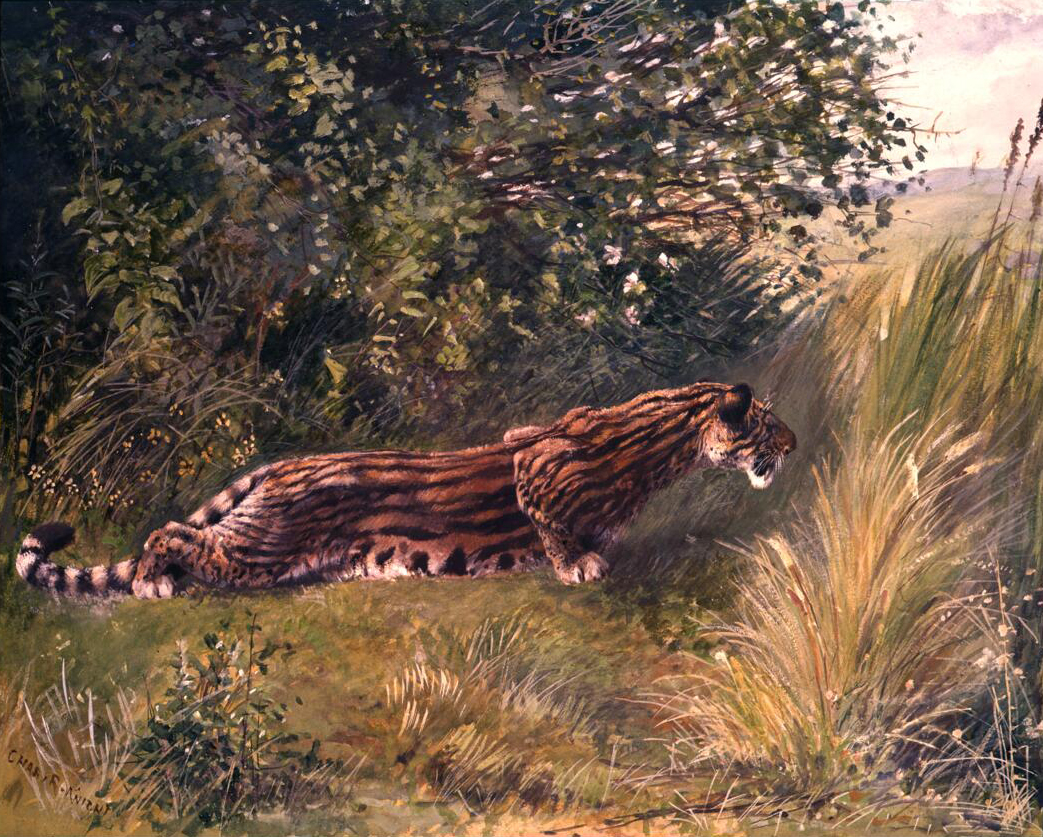
Hoplophoneus

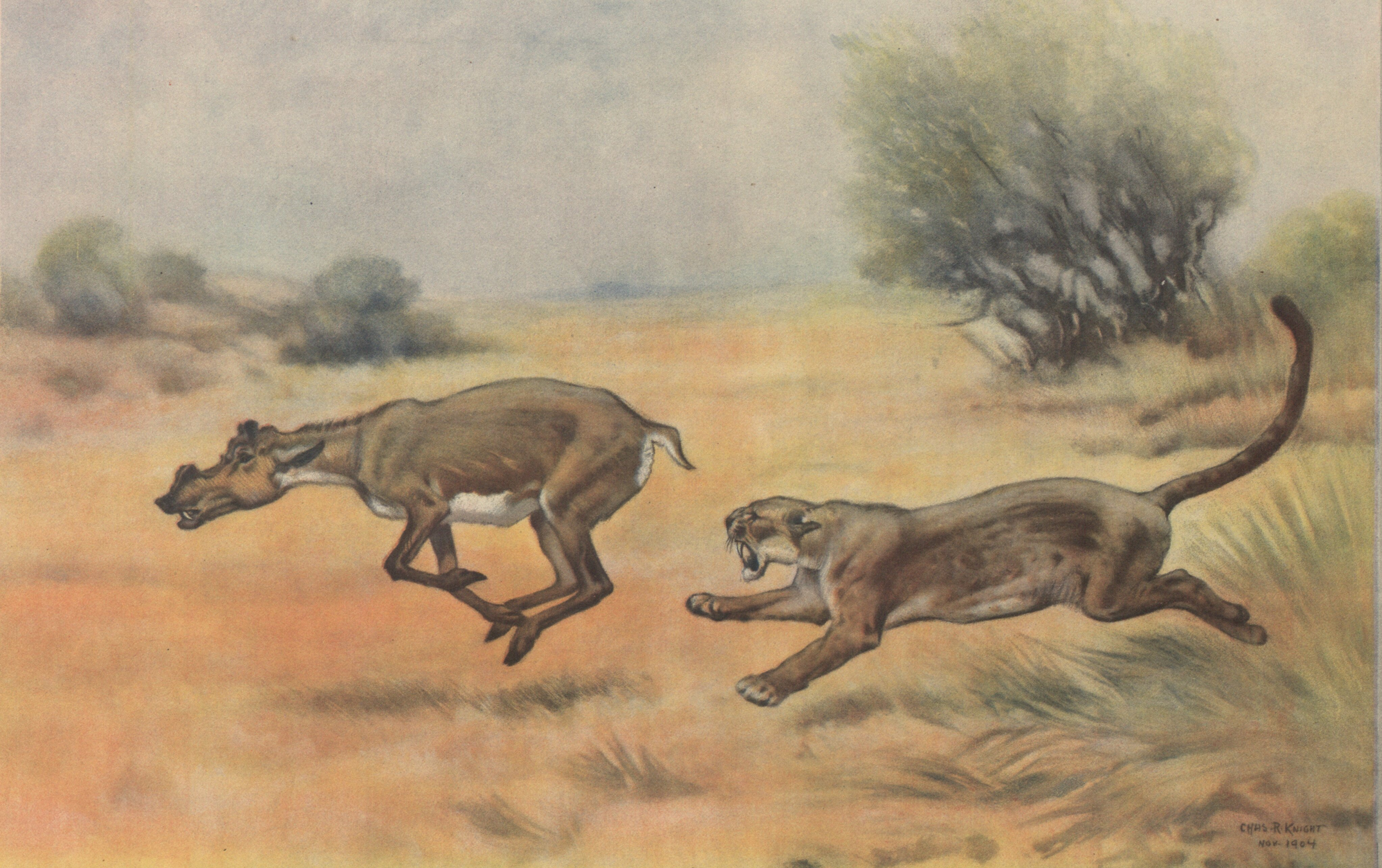
Dinictis and Protoceras from 1904

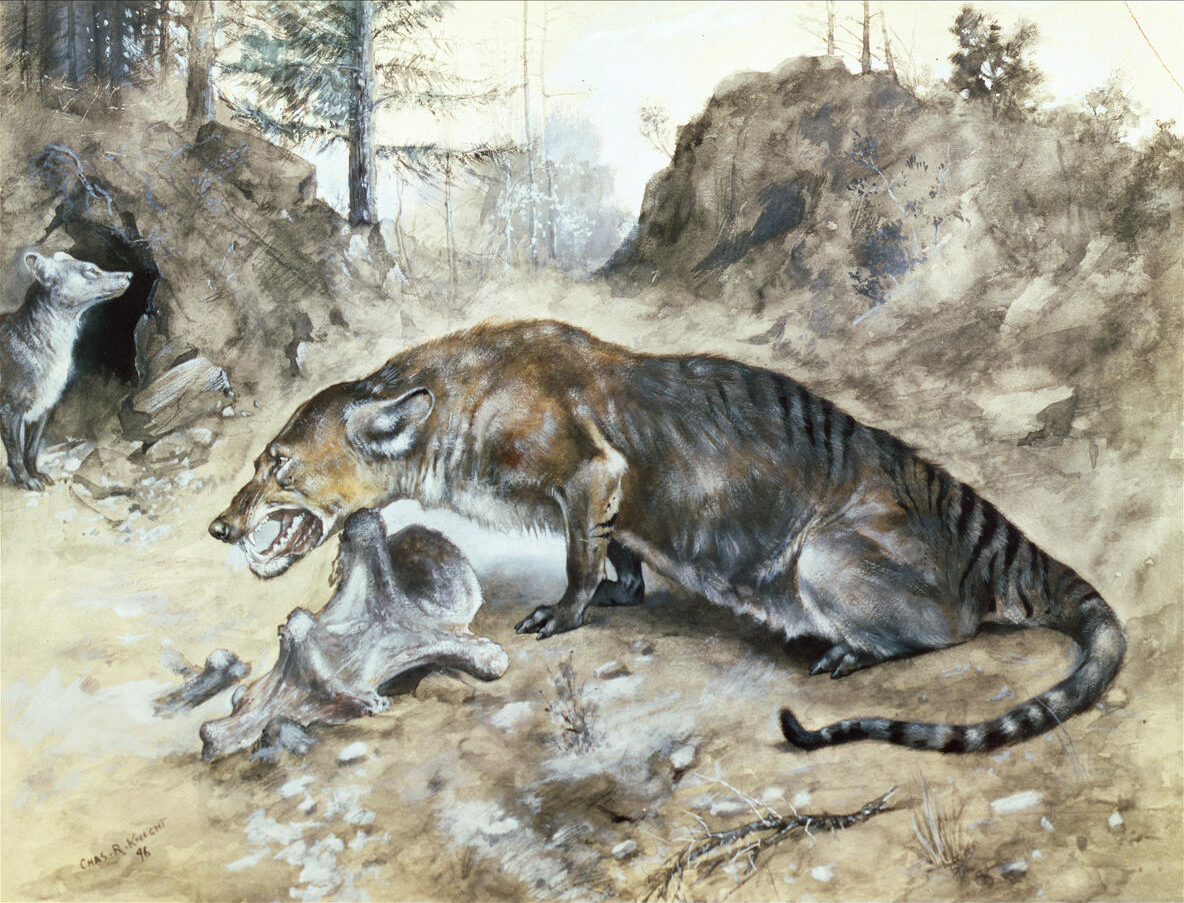
Mesonyx

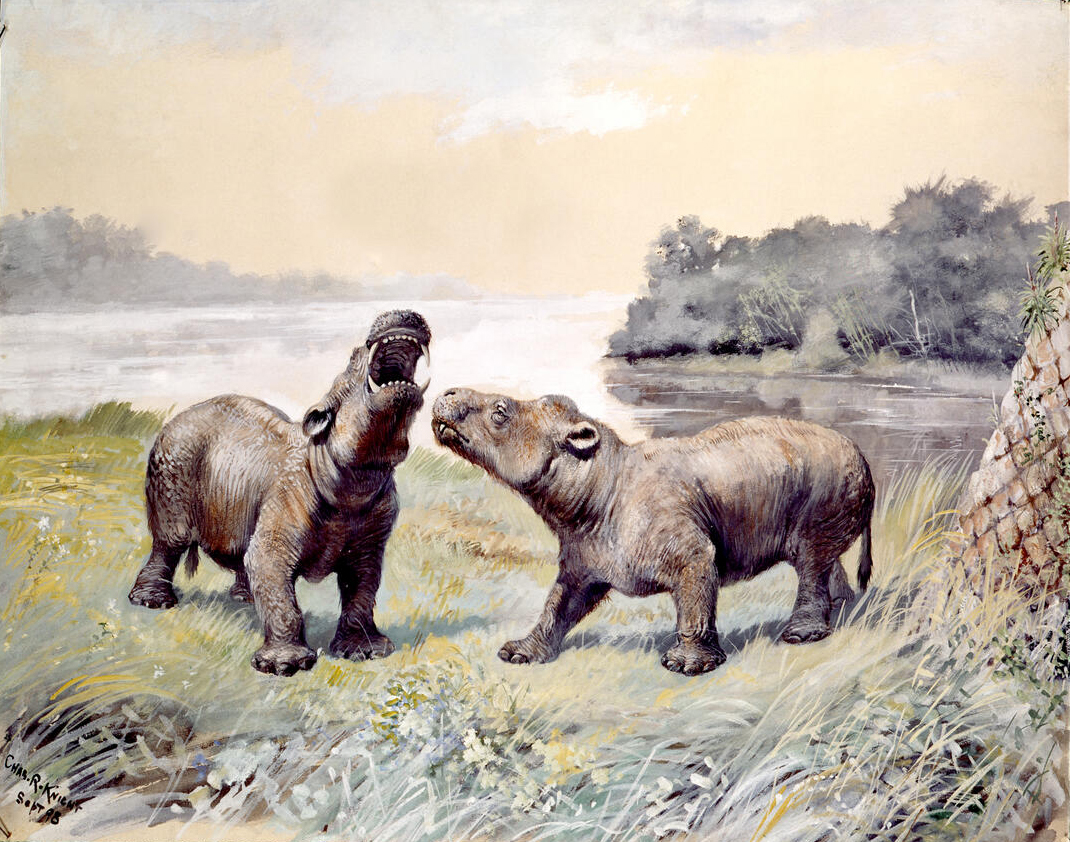
Coryphodon

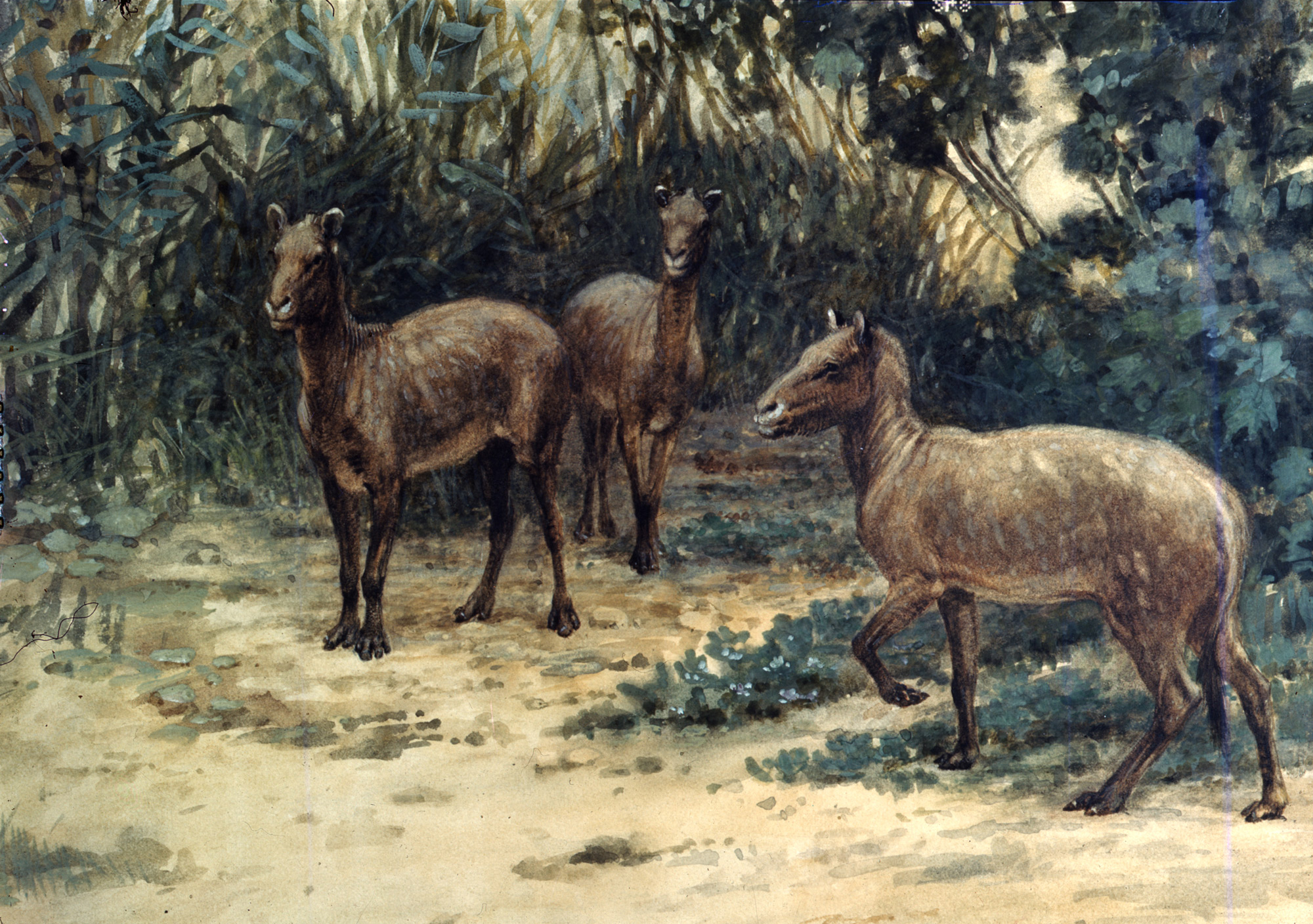
Eohippus

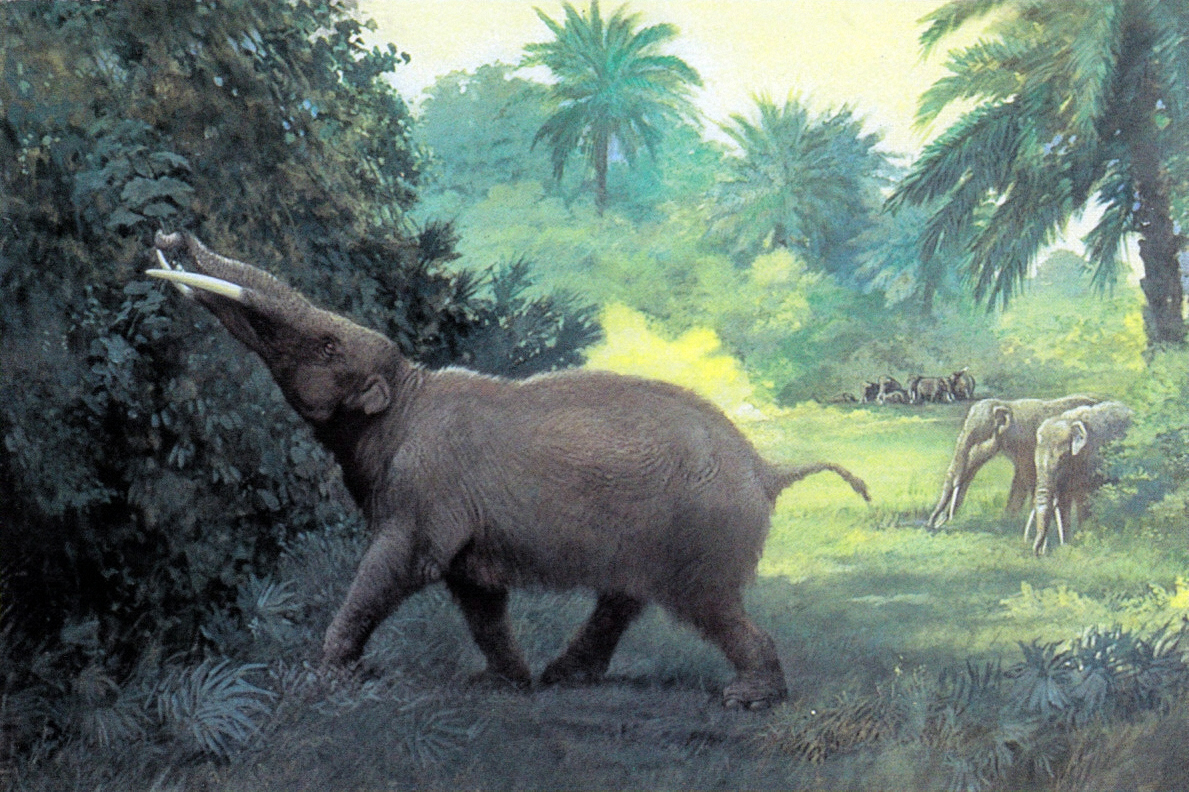
Trilophodon or “Mastodon” angustidens

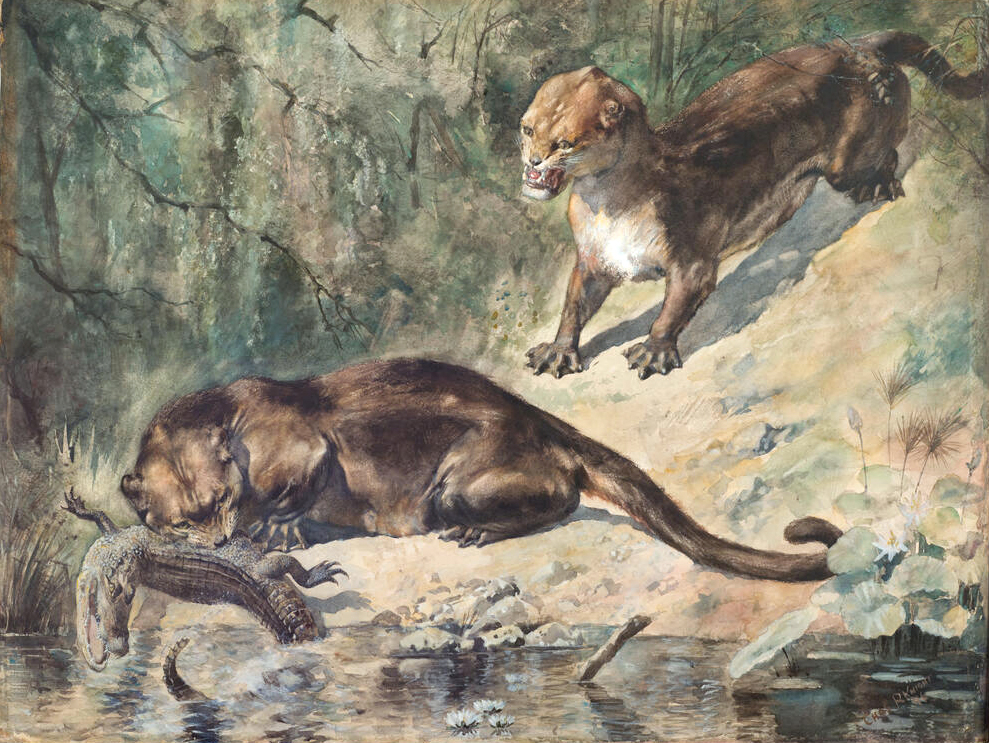
Patriofelis

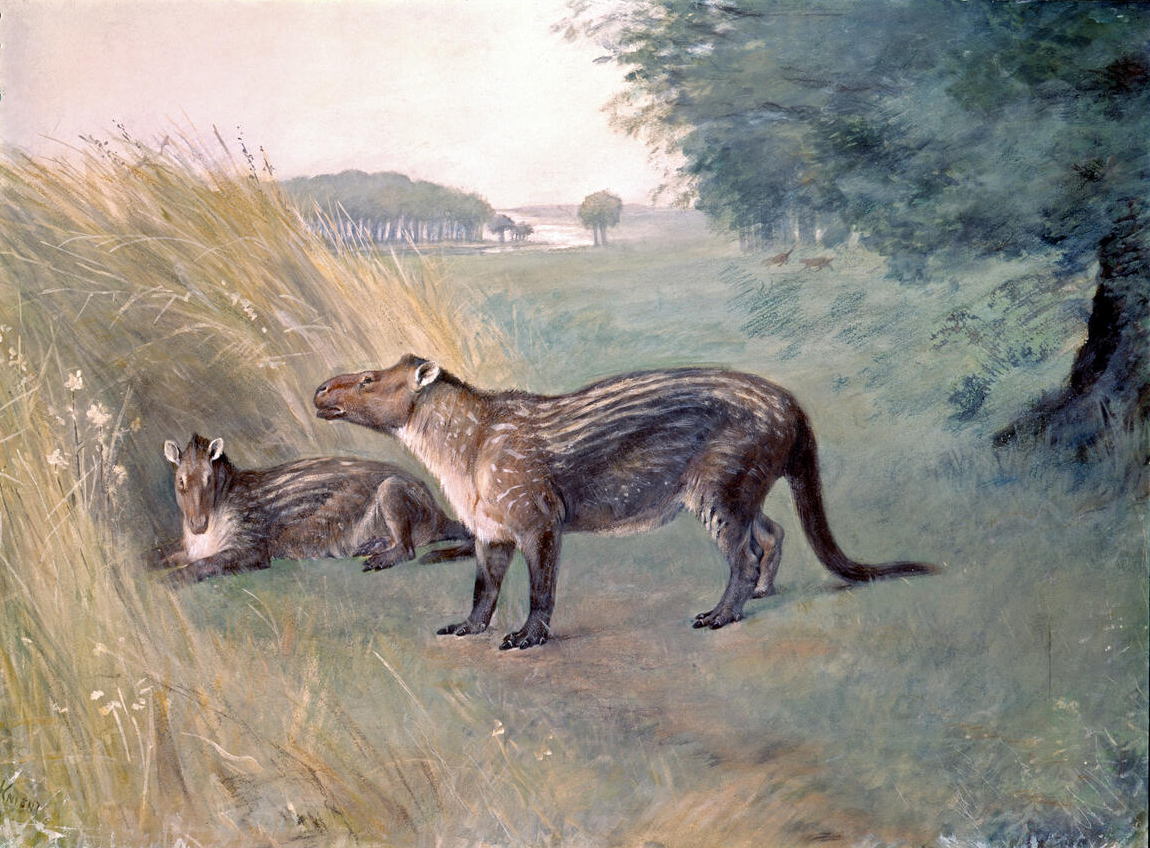
Phenacodus

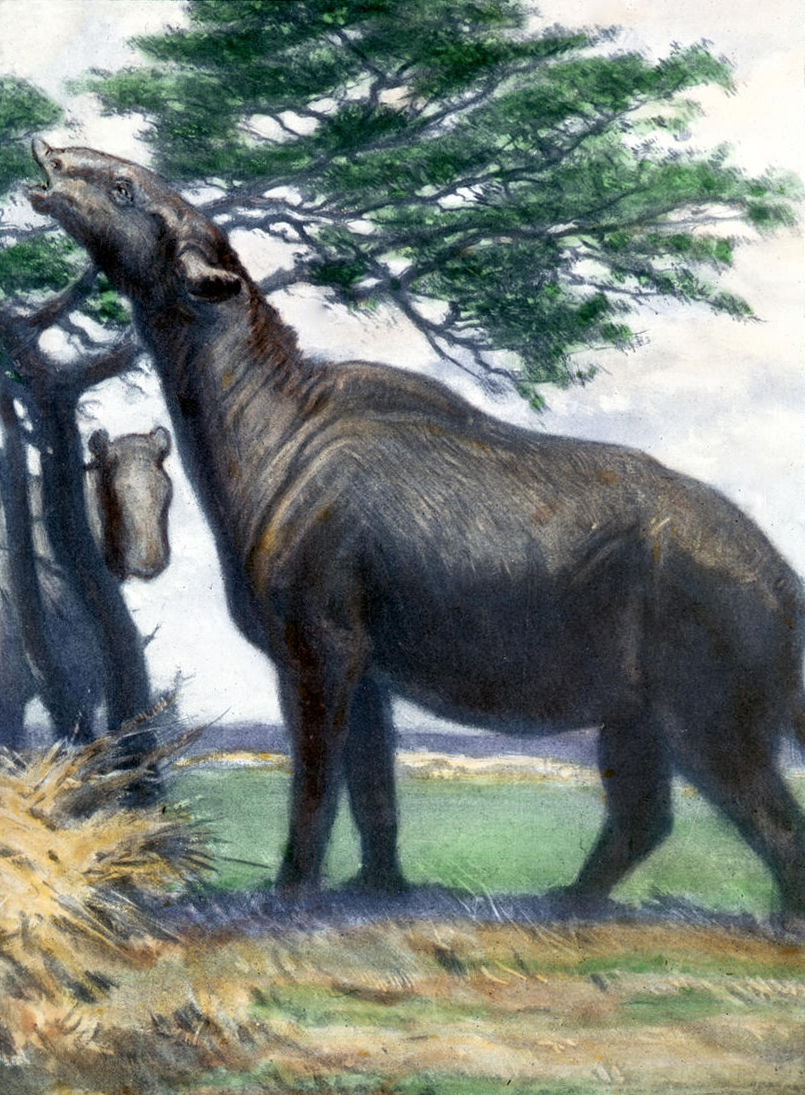
Paraceratherium

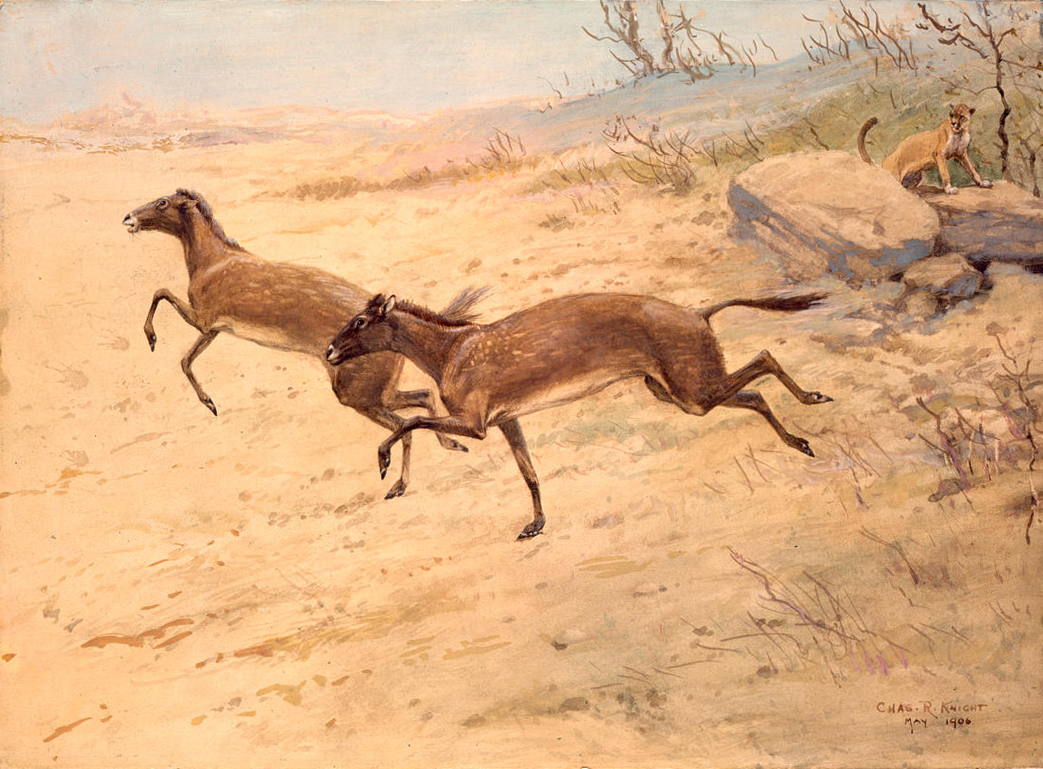
Mesohippus

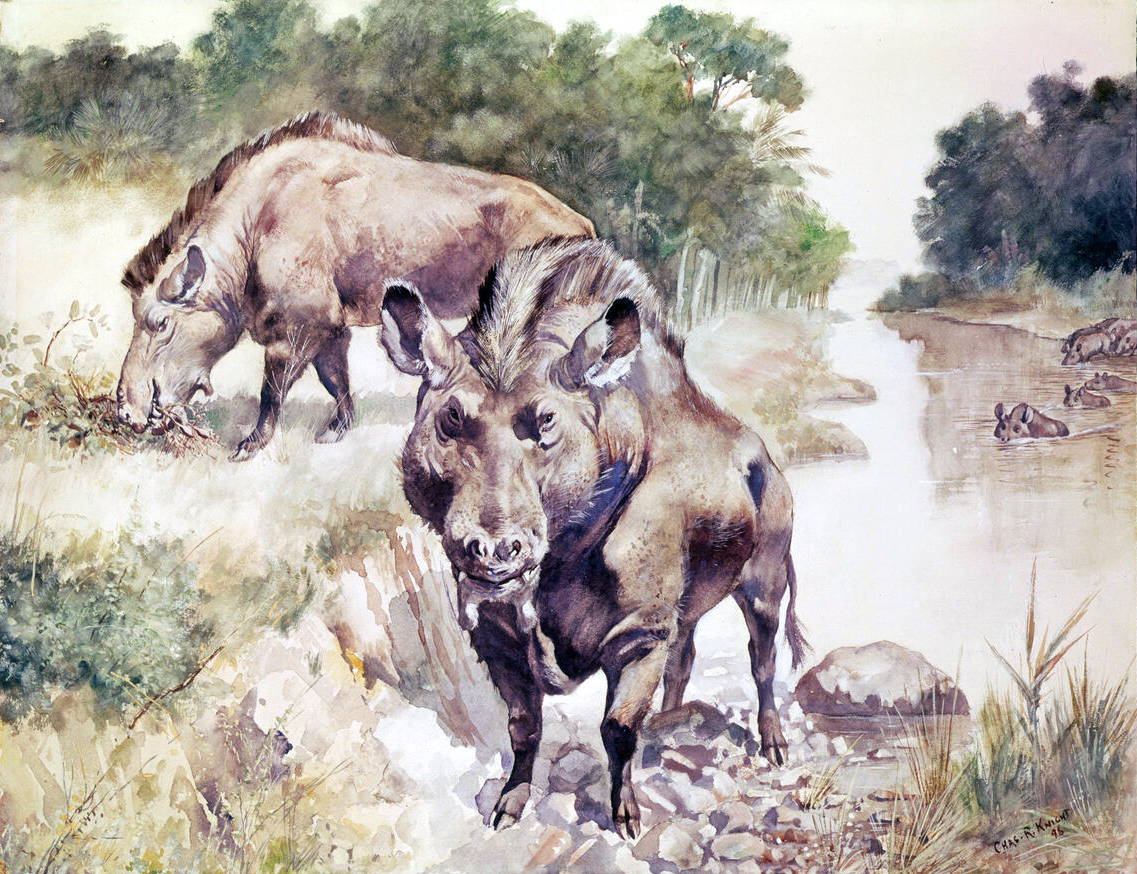
Entelodon

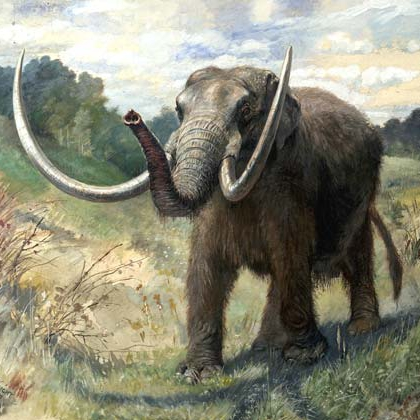
Mastodon

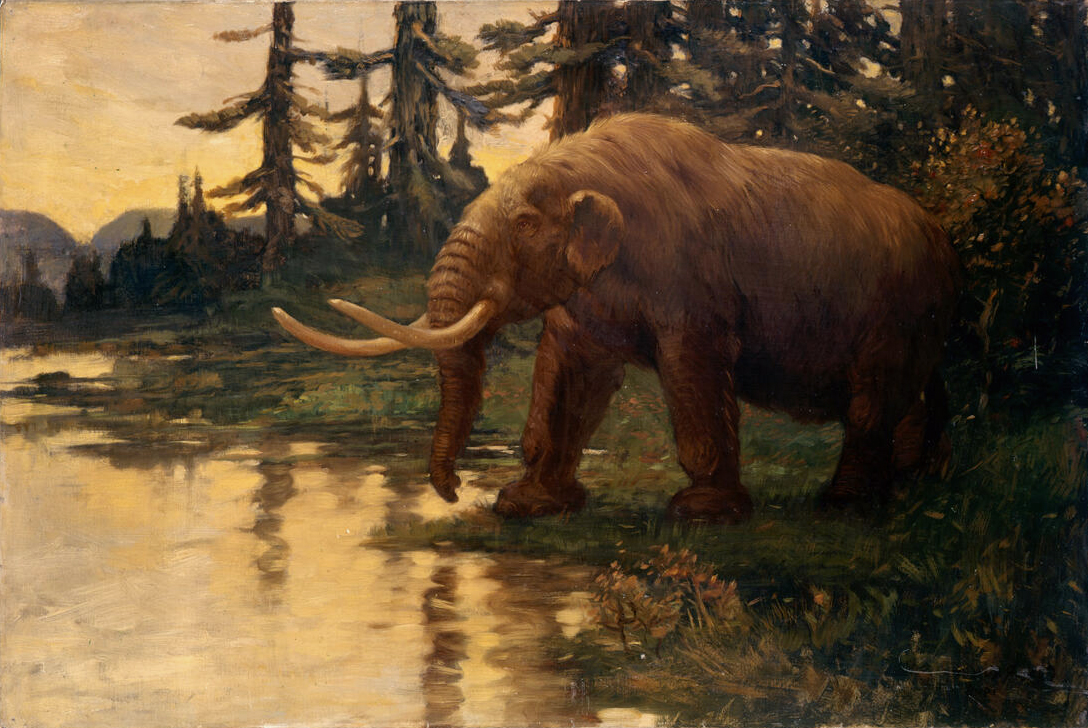
The Warren mastodon

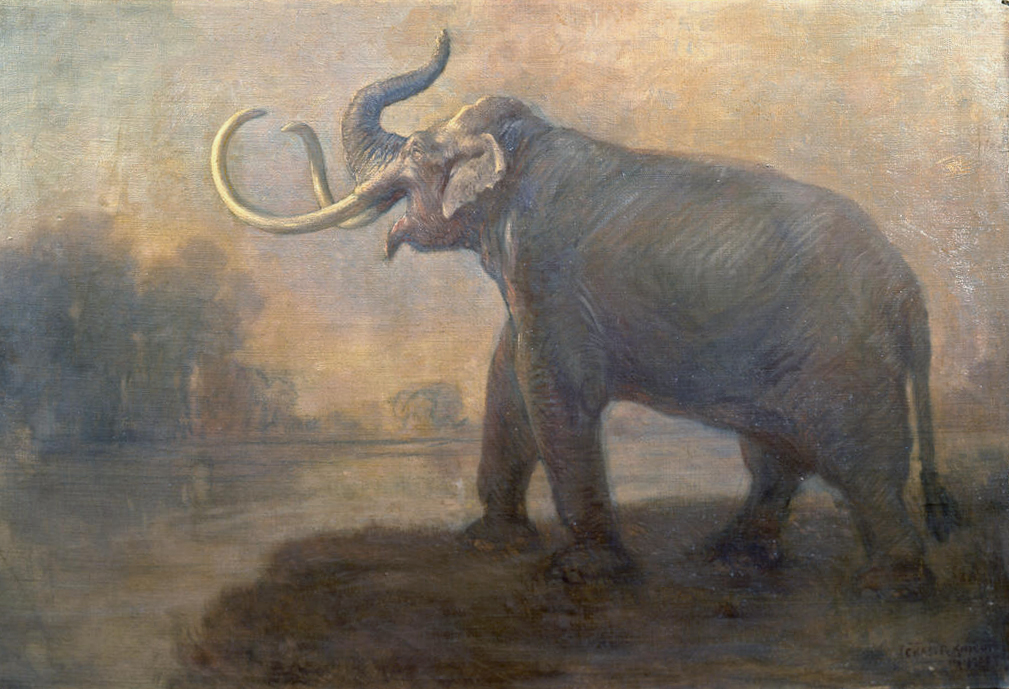
Imperial mammoth

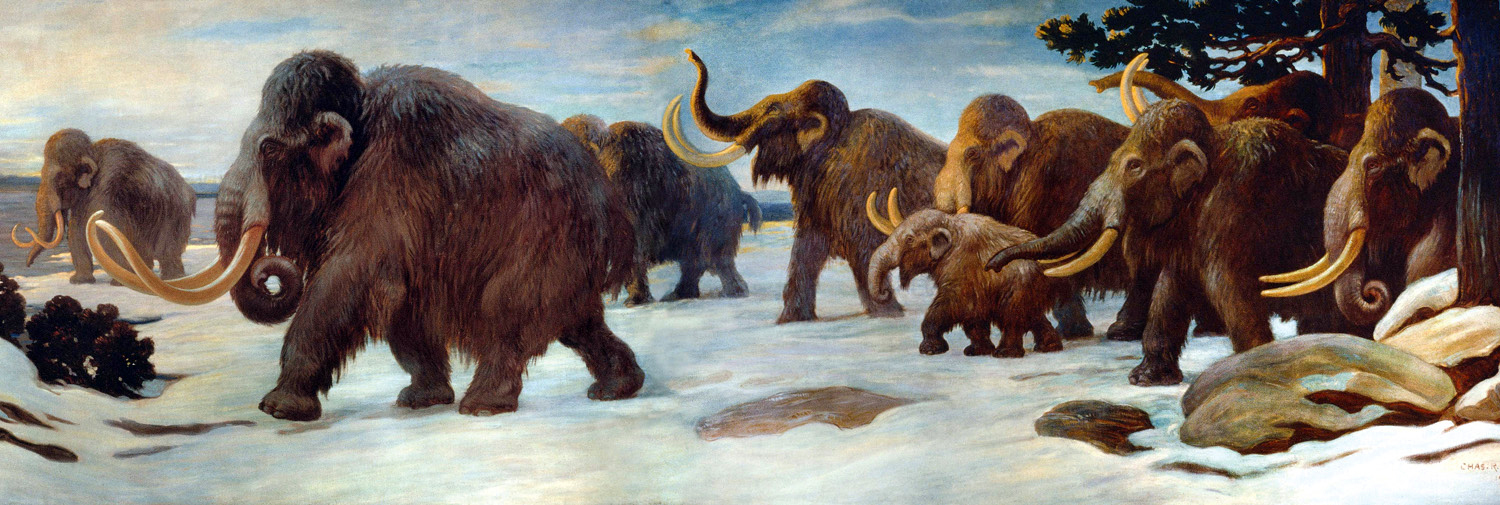
Wooly mammoths

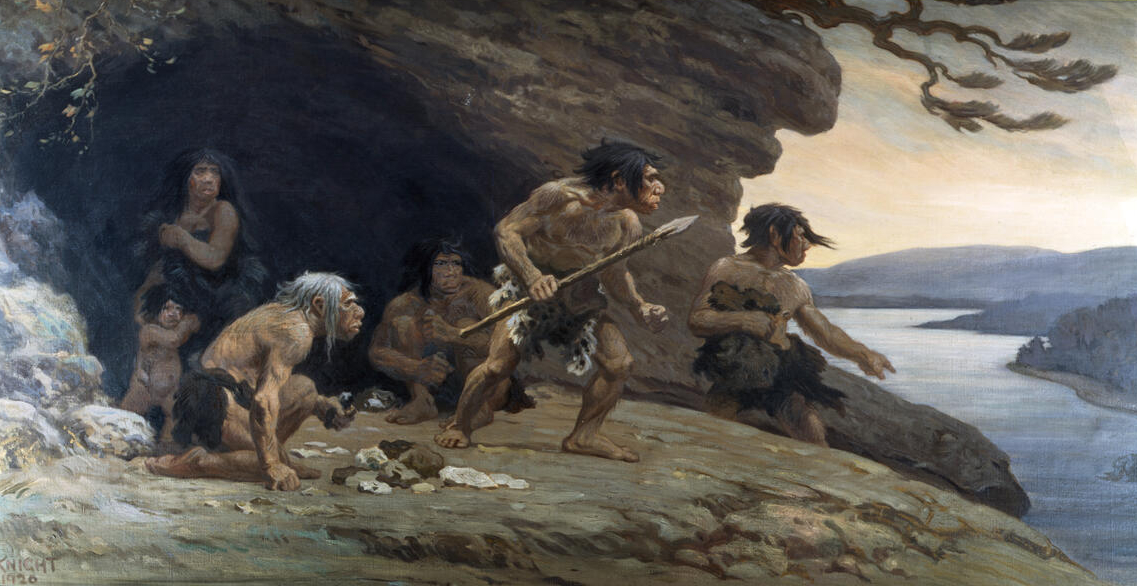
Neanderthal flintworkers from 1920

=== Publications ===
- Before the Dawn of History, 1935
- Life Through the Ages, 1946
- Animal Drawing: Anatomy and Action for Artists, 1947
- Prehistoric Man: The Great Adventurer, 1949
- Charles R. Knight, Autobiography of an Artist, 2005

== See also ==
- Paleoart
- Wildlife art
- Zdeněk Burian
