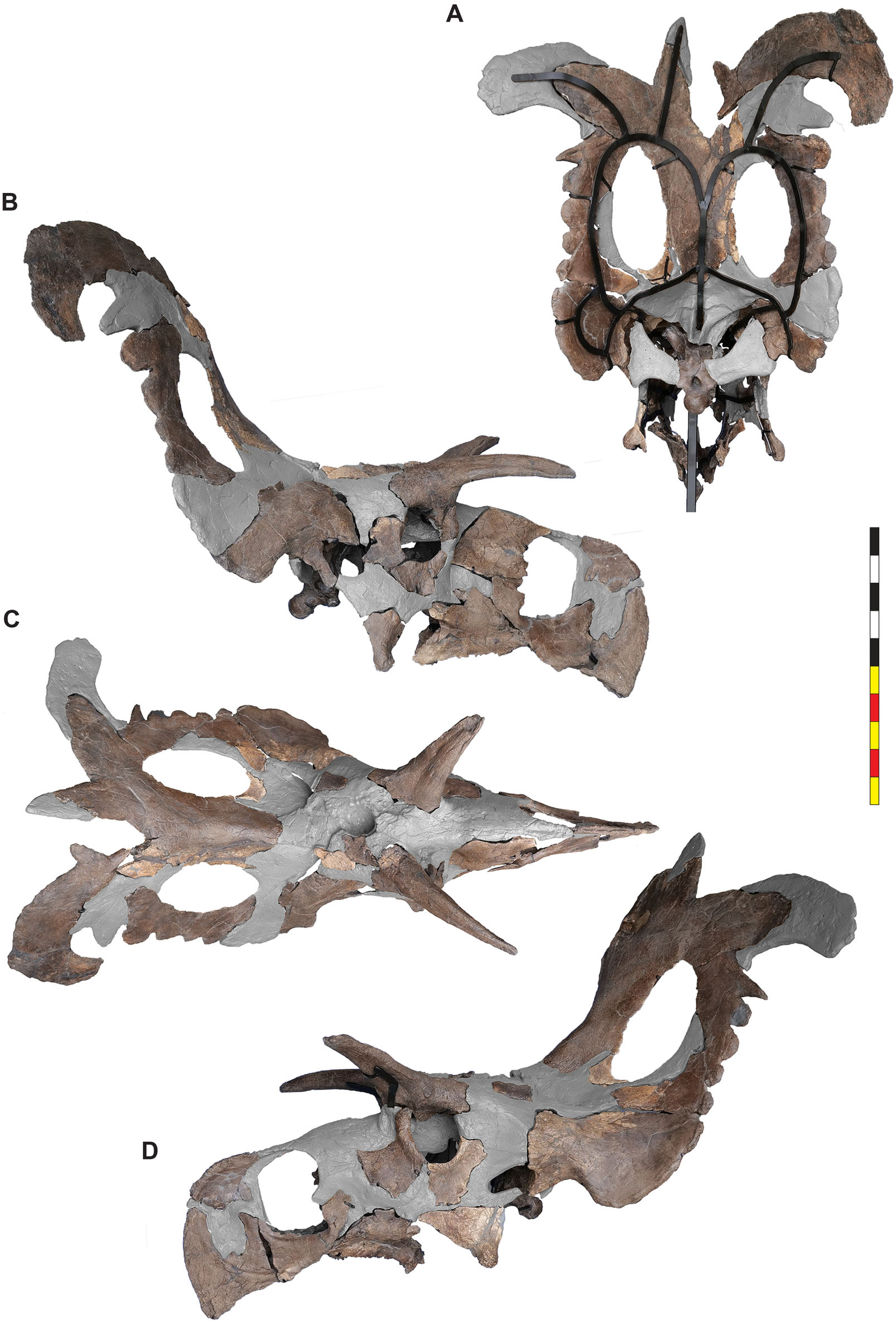
- Mounted skull of Lokiceratops

Scientific classification
- Kingdom: Animalia
- Phylum: Chordata
- Class: Reptilia
- Clade: Dinosauria
- Clade: †Ornithischia
- Clade: †Ceratopsia
- Family: †Ceratopsidae
- Subfamily: †Centrosaurinae
- Clade: †Albertaceratopsini
- Genus: †Lokiceratops; Loewen et al., 2024
- Species: †L. rangiformis

Binomial name
- †Lokiceratops rangiformis Loewen et al., 2024

= Lokiceratops =

Lokiceratops Temporal range: Late Cretaceous (Campanian), ~78.1 Ma

Genus of ceratopsian dinosaur

Lokiceratops (meaning "Loki horned face") is an extinct genus of centrosaurine ceratopsian dinosaur from the Late Cretaceous (Campanian) Judith River Formation of Montana, United States. The genus contains a single species, L. rangiformis, known from most of the skull and a partial skeleton. Four other ceratopsians are known from the same stratigraphic interval as Lokiceratops—more than in any other locality—suggesting that this clade was very diverse during the Late Cretaceous of northern Laramidia.

== Discovery and naming ==
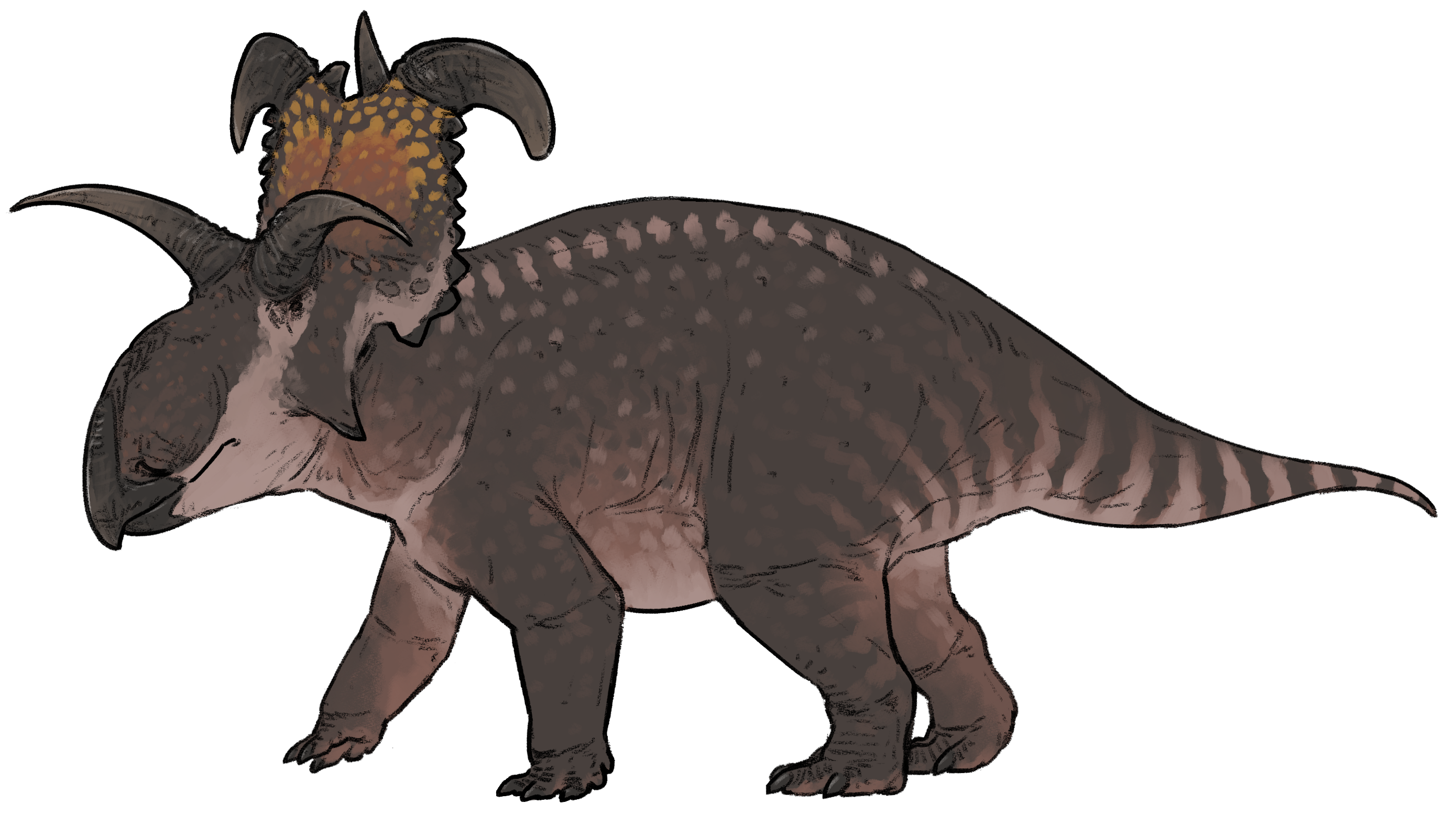
Speculative life restoration

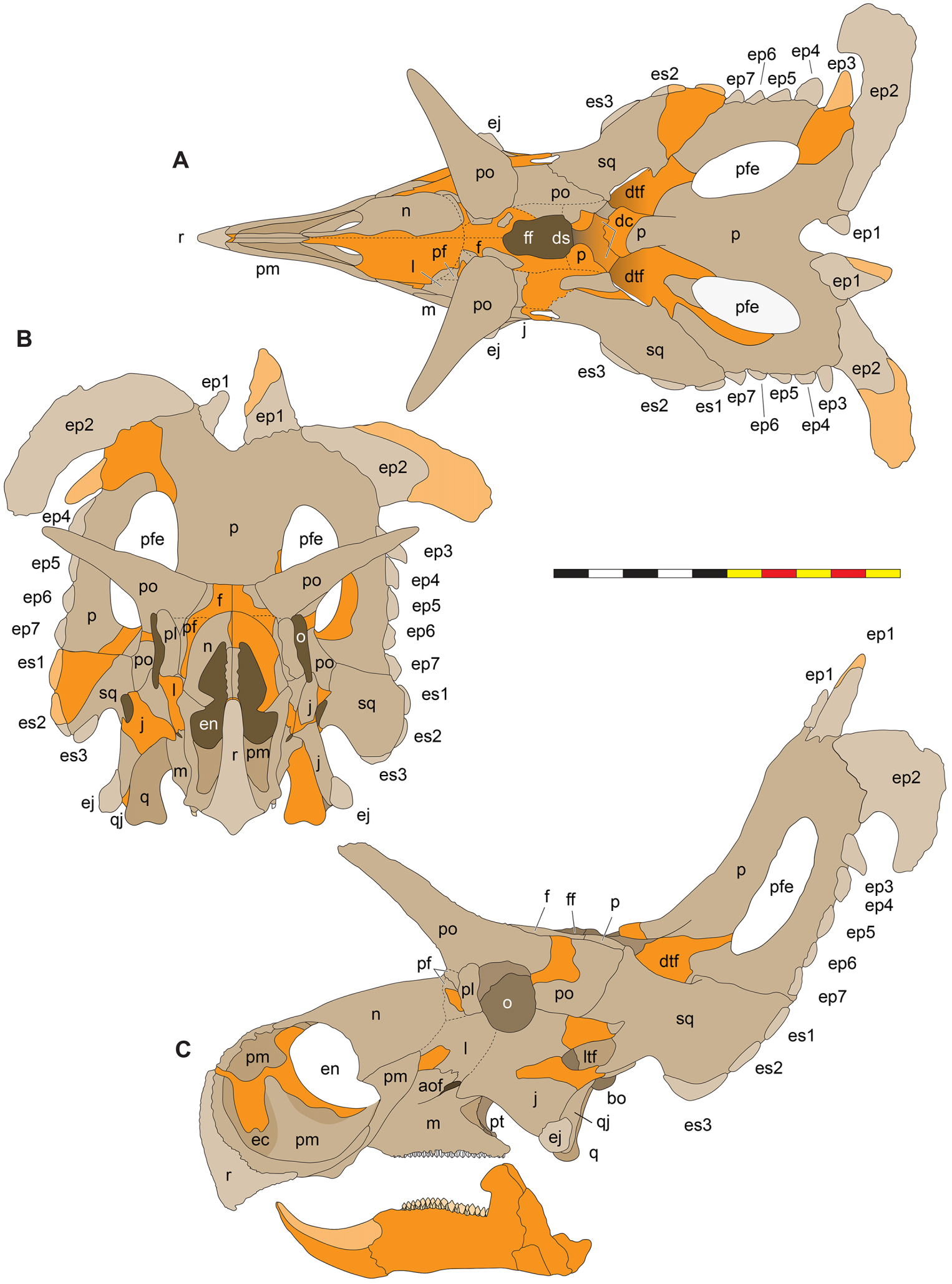
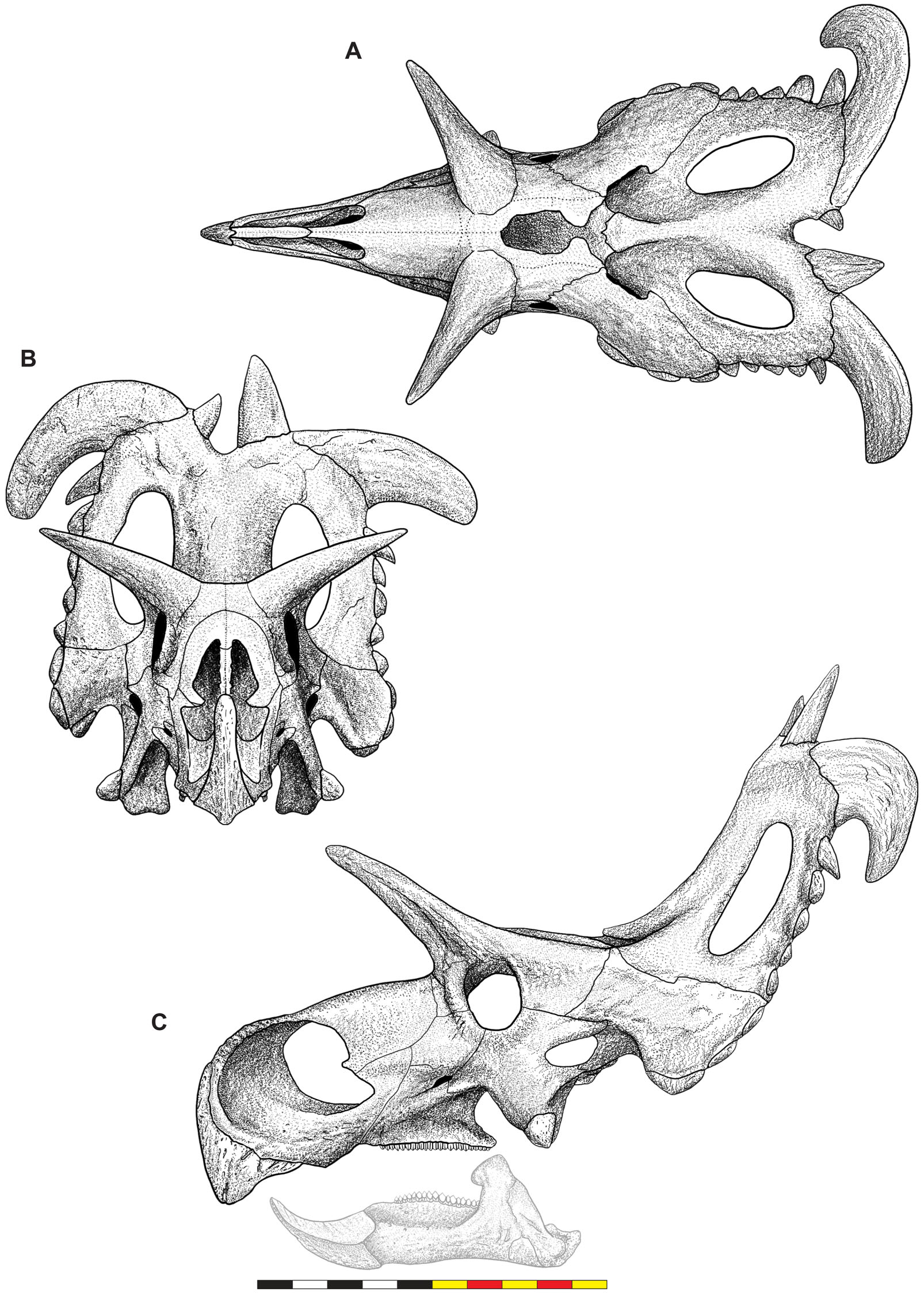
Skull of Lokiceratops; reconstruction with unknown material in orange (left) and lifelike illustration (right)

The Lokiceratops holotype specimen, EMK 0012, was discovered by Mark Eatman in 2019 in the Loki Quarry, representing outcrops of the Judith River Formation (McClelland Ferry Member) in the Kennedy Coulee. This locality is situated in the badlands near Milk River and the town of Rudyard in Hill County, northern Montana, United States, close to the Canadian border. The specimen was discovered disarticulated but in association, with much of the material exhibiting some degree of plastic deformation due to compression.

The holotype consists of many bones of the skull and fragmentary postcrania, comprising a posterior cervical vertebra, the synsacrum and associated dorsal and caudal vertebrae, an isolated caudal vertebra and chevron, the fused right scapula and coracoid of the pectoral girdle, and both ilia and ischia of the pelvic girdle.

Following its discovery and collection, EMK 0012 was transported to Fossilogic, a company specializing in the preparation of fossils. The material was prepared throughout 2021 before being molded to create accessible plastic casts for researchers. A lifelike reconstructed skull could then be assembled by articulating the identified bones and filling in the gaps with mirrored bones from the opposite side of the skull and data informed by related species. A skull cast was made for display and researcher access at both the Natural History Museum of Utah in Salt Lake City, Utah (UMNH VP C-991) and the Royal Ontario Museum in Toronto, Canada (ROM 88670). Once fully ready for display, the holotype material was moved to the Museum of Evolution (Evolutionsmuseet) at the Knuthenborg Safaripark in Maribo, Lolland, Denmark, where it is now permanently reposited. In 2022—following the museum's acquisition of the specimen and prior to its academic description—the Knuthenbord Safaripark announced that the skeleton represented a new species of ceratopsian dinosaur that would eventually be named after a Norse god. They further noted that the holotype specimen, nicknamed "Frederik", represents one of the first distinct dinosaur species to be displayed in the country.

In 2024, an international team of researchers led by Mark A. Loewen and Joseph J. W. Sertich published the description in PeerJ of Lokiceratops rangiformis as a new genus and species of centrosaurine ceratopsian based on these fossil remains. The generic name, Lokiceratops, combines a reference to Loki, the Norse god, with the Greek word "ceratops"—derived from kéras (κέρας), meaning "horn" and ṓps (ὤψ), meaning "face"—a common suffix for ceratopsian names. This name was chosen in reference to the similarity between the dinosaur's frill horns and the curved blades sometimes associated with Loki. It also honors the partnership between researchers in the United States (where the specimen was found) and Denmark, a Nordic country (where the specimen is housed). The specific name, rangiformis, references the mammal genus Rangifer (commonly known as the caribou or reindeer) whose antlers are said to be bilaterally asymmetrical as in the frill ornamentations of Lokiceratops. Thus, the full binomial name is intended to mean "Loki's horned face that looks like a caribou".

== Description ==
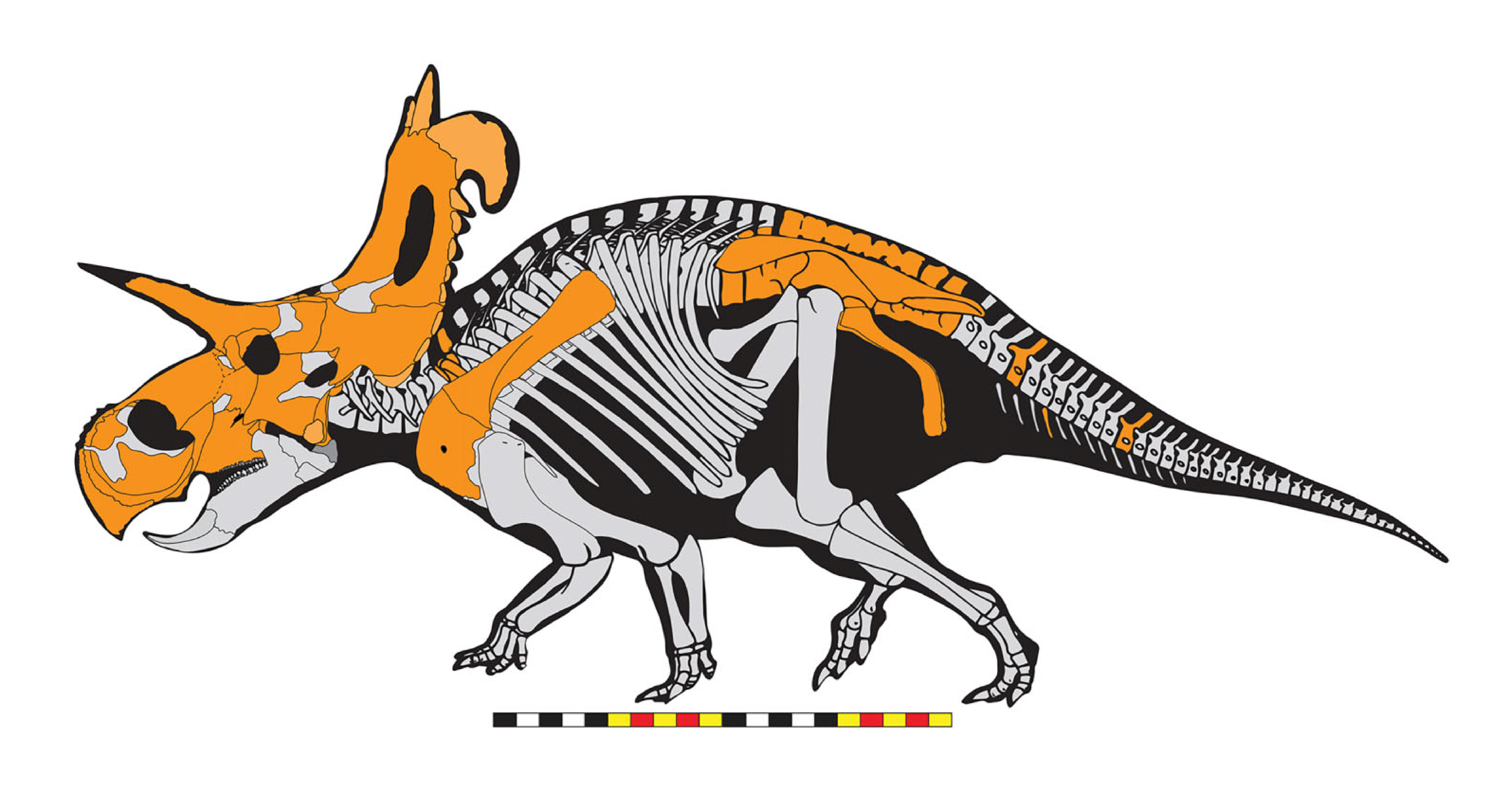
Reconstructed skeleton with known material in orange

The fossil material of Lokiceratops is about 20% larger than putative adult individuals of the contemporary ceratopsian Medusaceratops. The skull has a basal length of about 0.95 metres (3.1 ft) and a total length of 1.92–1.99 metres. The holotype individual was likely around 6.7 metres (22 ft) long, with a weight of about 5 tonnes (11,000 lb). As such, it represents one of the largest known centrosaurines.

Unlike its closest relatives, Lokiceratops appears to lack a nasal horn. The second epiparietal is hypertrophied (excessively enlarged) and bladelike, curving laterally along the same plane as the frill. These horns are larger than any other known centrosaurine frill ossification.

== Classification ==
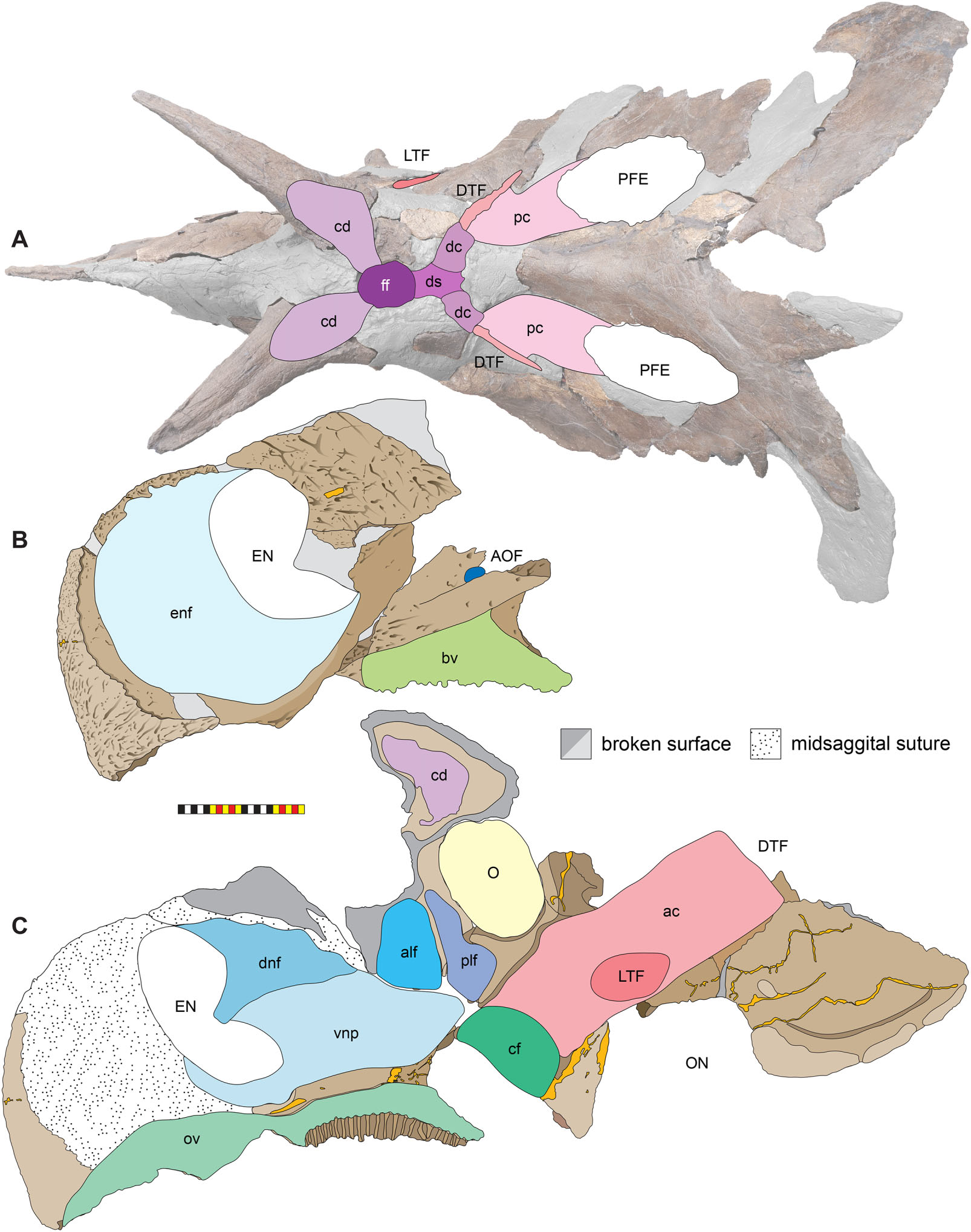
Pneumatic regions of the Lokiceratops skull, including the round external narial fossa (enf) characteristic of centrosaurines

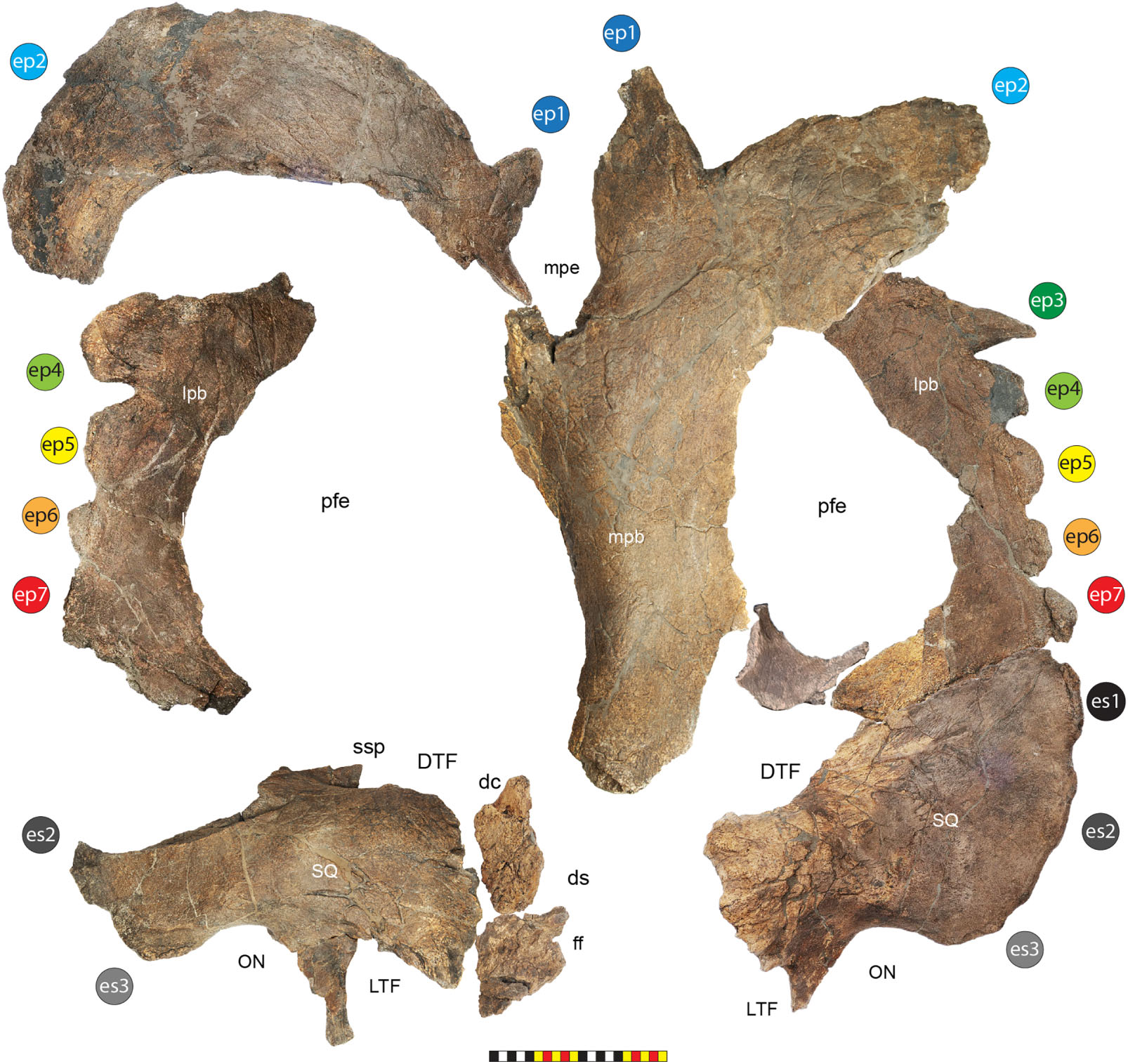
Frill of Lokiceratops

To determine the relationships of Lokiceratops, Loewen et al. (2024) tested it using a phylogenetic analysis. Based on several characters—including the presence of more than six epiparietals on each side of the frill, the large, flat, bladelike epiparietals, the round premaxillary external narial fossa, and the fan-like squamosal—it could be identified as a member of the ceratopsian subfamily Centrosaurinae. More precisely, they recovered it as the sister taxon to the clade formed by Albertaceratops and the contemporary Medusaceratops. Loewen et al. named the clade to which the three species belong the Albertaceratopsini. All three of these genera share a rounded (rather than narrow) frontoparietal fontanelle, as well as a first epiparietal situated in the same lateral plane as the frill. Their results are displayed in the cladogram below, along with comparative illustrations of the reconstructed frills of well-known genera:

- Centrosaurinae
  - Diabloceratops
  - Machairoceratops
  - - Yehuecauhceratops
    - Menefeeceratops
  - - Xenoceratops
    - ?
      CPC 279 (Cerro del Pueblo Fm. centrosaurine)
    - Nasutoceratopsini
      - Crittendenceratops
      - - Nasutoceratops
        - Avaceratops specimens
    - - Albertaceratopsini
        - Lokiceratops
        - - Albertaceratops
          - Medusaceratops
      - - - Wendiceratops
          - Sinoceratops
        - Eucentrosaura
          - Coronosaurus
          - Spinops
          - Centrosaurus
          - - Styracosaurus spp.
            - - Stellasaurus
              - Pachyrhinosaurini

Following the peer-reviewed description of Lokiceratops, some paleontologists expressed criticism regarding its validity and distinction from its closest albertaceratopsin relatives, Alberaceratops and Medusaceratops. Paleontologist Denver Fowler explained that some ceratopsians, such as the well-studied Triceratops, are known to change noticeably in morphology throughout the course of their lives. He further noted that some of the anatomical characteristics of Lokiceratops may actually be indicative of a fully mature Medusaceratops, rather than a distinct taxon; as in mature Triceratops, the brow horns are hollow, compared to younger individuals' solid horns. This would imply some degree of intraspecific variability (differences between individuals of the same species) within centrosaurines.

Other peer reviewers expressed doubt that differences in frills indicated distinct species. Paleontologist Jordan Mallon was skeptical that five species of massive plant eaters could coexist in such a small region of what is now Montana and western Canada. He notes that most of the variations of those species are with their frill patterns and not their feeding adaptations. "Their jaws and teeth are more or less built the same way." If the region did indeed support that much diversity, he says, you would expect the animals to be feeding on different types of plants to avoid competition. Dinosaur paleontologist Elizabeth Freedman Fowler expressed concern over the methods used to collect the fossils. Only two of the fossils collected were protected using plaster jackets as is good field collection practice - they wrapped the rest in aluminum foil. Some of the bones might have broken, Fowler says, and precious information about the new specimen might have been lost.

== Environment ==
The Loki Quarry is characterized by carbonaceous fine-grained sandstones, siltstones, and mudstones, with depositional features indicating a poorly-drained fluvial system. Gar scales & mollusks occur in the quarry, as well as carbonized plant fragments and wood, and beads of amber.

== Paleoecology ==
Lokiceratops lived in the Judith River Formation of what is now Montana. It may have lived alongside many other dinosaurs including the fellow ceratopsids Furcatoceratops, Medusaceratops and Judiceratops, the ankylosaurs Edmontonia and Zuul, the hadrosaurs Brachylophosaurus and Corythosaurus, the pachycephalosaurs Colepiocephale and Hanssuesia, the maniraptorans Dromaeosaurus, Hesperornis, and Saurornitholestes, and the tyrannosaurs Daspletosaurus and Gorgosaurus. Lokiceratops would have also lived alongside several non-dinosaurian reptiles including the eusuchians Brachychampsa and Deinosuchus, which was likely an apex predator, the squamates Exostinus and Paraderma, the testudines Basilemys and Neurankylus, and the choristoderan Champsosaurus.
