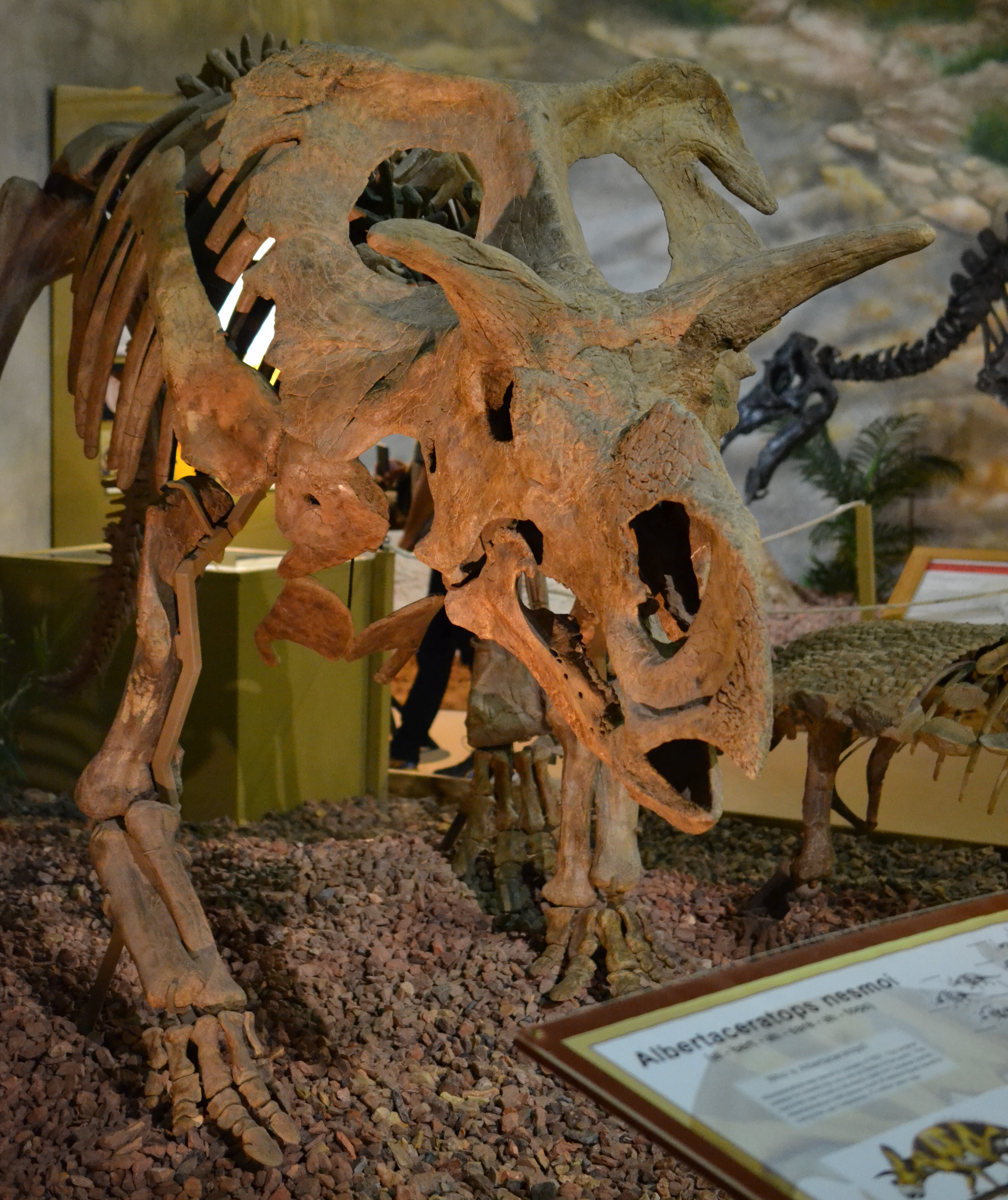
- Skeleton at Wyoming Dinosaur Museum formerly referred to Albertaceratops

Scientific classification
- Kingdom: Animalia
- Phylum: Chordata
- Class: Reptilia
- Clade: Dinosauria
- Clade: †Ornithischia
- Clade: †Ceratopsia
- Family: †Ceratopsidae
- Subfamily: †Centrosaurinae
- Clade: †Albertaceratopsini
- Genus: †Medusaceratops; Ryan, Russell & Hartman, 2010
- Species: †M. lokii

Binomial name
- †Medusaceratops lokii Ryan, Russell & Hartman, 2010

= Medusaceratops =

Medusaceratops Temporal range: Middle Campanian, 77.5 Ma

Extinct genus of dinosaurs

Medusaceratops is an extinct genus of centrosaurine ceratopsian dinosaur known from the Late Cretaceous Judith River Formation (middle Campanian stage) of Montana, northern United States. It contains a single species, Medusaceratops lokii.

== Discovery ==
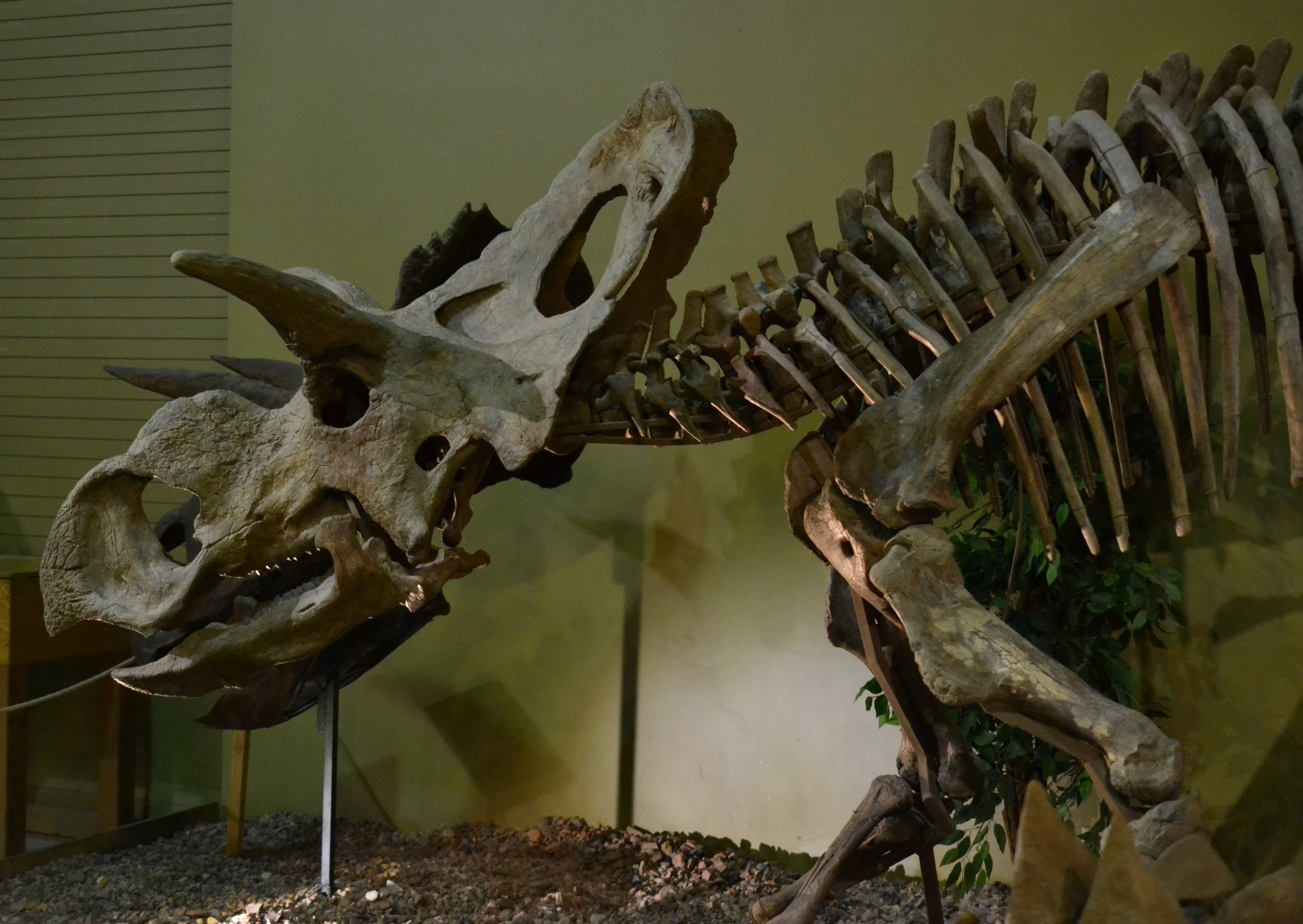
Side view of skeleton

The known material of Medusaceratops came from a bonebed in the badlands on the west side of Kennedy Coulee adjacent to the Milk River, in the Milk River Natural Area, near Havre, Hill County of Montana. The material was first reported by Sweeney and Boyden (1993), who considered it to represent the southernmost occurrence of Styracosaurus albertensis, based on misidentified frill spikes. Trexler and Sweeney (1995) reinterpreted the spikes as eye-socket horncores and noted their similarity to those of the nomen dubium Ceratops montanus from a nearby area, however, could not refer the bonebed material to any valid existing taxon. The bonebed, known as the Mansfield Bonebed honoring its landowner, is located on private land and historically has been excavated by several commercial companies. The type material of Medusaceratops and other specimens were excavated more recently and have been purchased by the Wyoming Dinosaur Center from Canada Fossils, Ltd., of Calgary, Alberta. Additional material from the same excavation was purchased and accessioned by the Royal Tyrrell Museum of Palaeontology. Canada Fossils, Ltd., also assembled two composite skeletons using the Mansfield Bonebed material which are in the collections of the Wyoming Dinosaur Center and the Fukui Prefectural Dinosaur Museum, however neither of the casts has an exact reconstruction of Medusaceratops as it was later described.

The name Medusaceratops was coined by Canadian paleontologist Michael J. Ryan of the Cleveland Museum of Natural History in 2003 in a dissertation. Its fossils were subsequently confused with those of Albertaceratops, another centrosaurine ceratopsian from Alberta which had been described by Ryan in 2007. Later, Ryan realized that the Mansfield Bonebed fossils did not belong to Albertaceratops. Medusaceratops was formally described and name by Michael J. Ryan, Anthony P. Russell and Scott Hartman in 2010 and the type species is Medusaceratops lokii. The generic name refers to Medusa, a monster from Greek mythology whose "hair" consists of snakes and its gaze could turn men to stone, alluding to a unique trait of this genus - the large, thick snake-like spikes that extend to the sides of the frill, in combination with Latinized Greek ceratops, meaning "horned-face", which is a common suffix for ceratopsian genera names. The specific name lokii honors Loki, a troublemaking god in the Norse mythology, in reference to the years confusion that surrounded the taxonomic designations of the Mansfield Bonebed material before it was given its own name.

The Mansfield Bonebed material was collected from the upper part of the Judith River Formation, in a region where it is lithologically equivalent to the Oldman Formation of Canada. The bonebed is located at approximately the same level as the holotype of Albertaceratops, dating to 77.5 million years ago, to the middle Campanian stage of the Late Cretaceous. Thus, Medusaceratops was considered to represent the oldest known chasmosaurine, until the naming of Judiceratops by Longrich (2013), also from the Judith River Formation, but from an area equivalent to the lower Oldman Formation or upper Foremost Formation.

However, Ryan had already indicated that part of the Mansfield material represented not a chasmosaurine, but a centrosaurine. Chiba et al. in 2017 described new material of Medusaceratops from the Mansfield Bonebed, found in 2011 and 2012 by David Trexler, indicating the presence of traits that were characteristic of Centrosaurinae in the skeleton of M. lokii. They concluded that all the material could be referred to a single species. The phylogenetic analysis conducted by the authors indicated that Medusaceratops was not a member of Chasmosaurinae after all, but rather an early centrosaurine ceratopsid that was more closely related to Centrosaurini and Pachyrhinosaurini than Nasutoceratopsini.

== Description ==
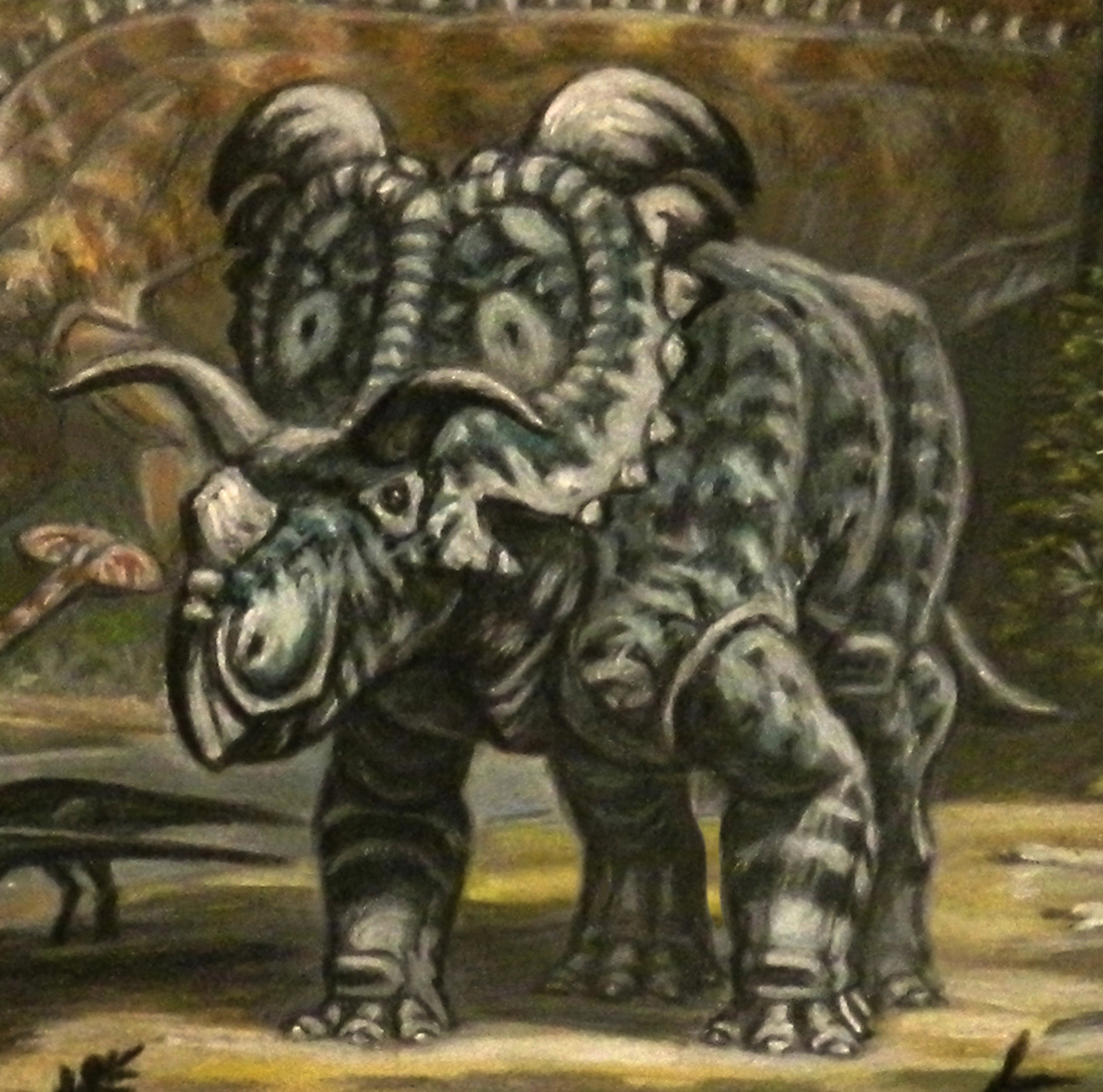
Restoration

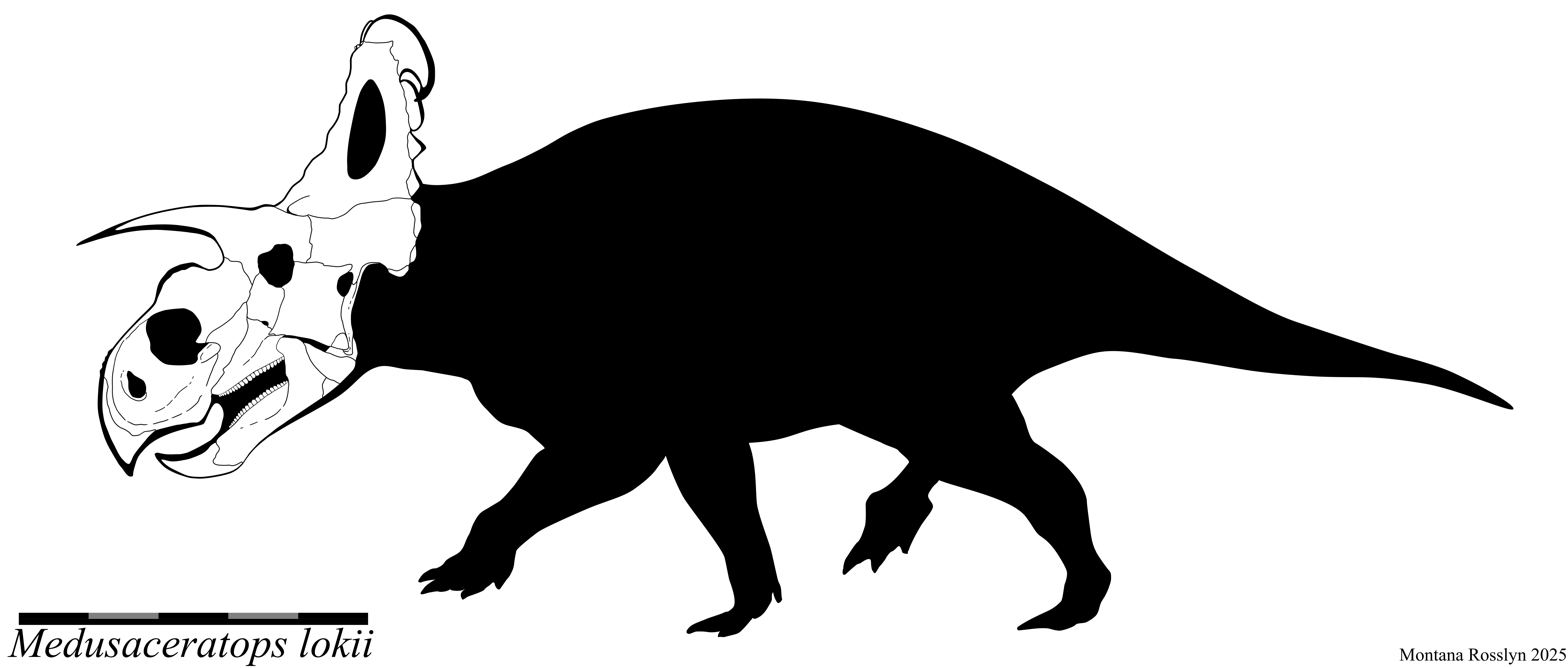
Skeletal Diagram

Two partial parietals (frills) that are housed at the Wyoming Dinosaur Center were chosen as the type material of Medusaceratops, including the holotype WDC DJR 001 and the paratype WDC DJR 002. Although all the chasmosaurine material from the Mansfield Bonebed was thought to be referable to Medusaceratops, which totals at several hundred individual elements, upon its original description only these two partial frills have been scientifically described while the rest of the material was being reexamined. Many of the other elements are not diagnosable to a genus level and can only be confidently referable to Ceratopsidae.

Upon its original description Medusaceratops was thought to represent a chasmosaurine. It was suggested that based on its type material alone, Medusaceratops is unique among Chasmosaurinae in having only three epiparietals (frill spikes) on each side of the frill. The first frill spike pair is large and the second is smaller, and both are uniquely widened at base, pachyostotic, curve down the sides of the frill, and are depressed down the front of the frill. The third frill spike pair is small and triangular, unmodified in comparison to early chasmosaurines, but similarly depressed, and borders the squamosal bone. The highly broadened and curved first frill spike pair of Medusaceratops closely resembles the third pair of the frill ornamentation of Albertaceratops, however Medusaceratops was thought to differ (like all chasmosaurines) in lacking tab-shaped, frequently overlapping fourth to seventh pairs of the frill ornamentation of centrosaurines.

This was challenged in 2018, by the description of additional Mansfield Bonebed material assignable to Medusaceratops. It became apparent that the 1-3 frill spikes mentioned above are in fact spikes 2–4. The first epiparietal is small and variably procurving and thus was misinterpreted before. At least one more epiparietal pair was also identified (after the fourth), resulting in a total of at least 5 pairs, consistent with centrosaurines like Albertaceratops and Wendiceratops, but not with chasmosaurines. The midline ramus of Medusaceratops, a bone separating the two sides of the frill, was also among the newly described material. It is broad, resulting in rounder and smaller frill fenestrae (holes) like in other centrosaurines. Thus, the new study reassigned Medusaceratops to Centrosaurinae, among which it is most similar to Albertaceratops and Wendiceratops.

In 2010, a length of roughly 6 meters (~20 feet) was estimated for Medusaceratops lokii.

== Classification ==
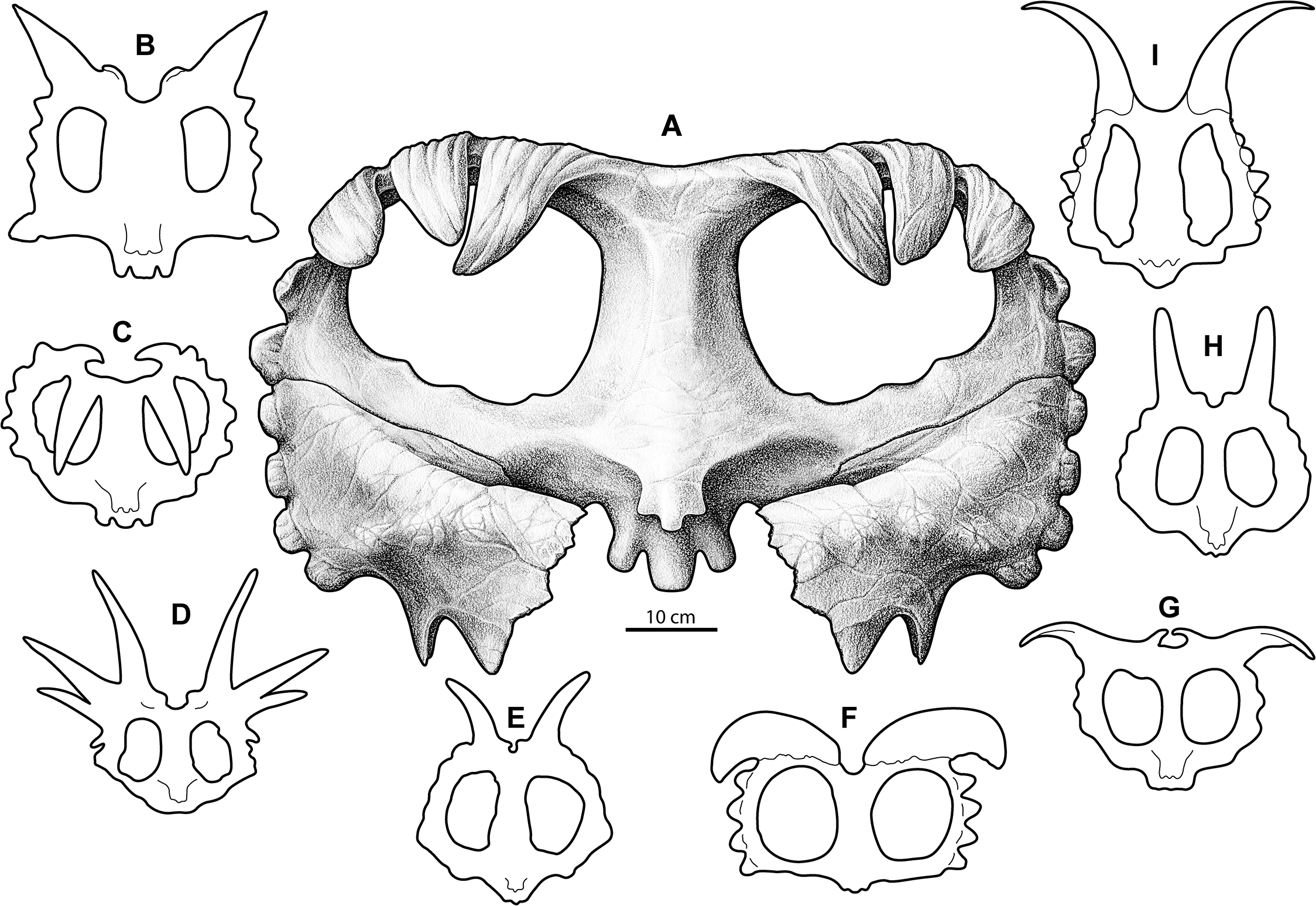
Reconstruction of parietals of various centrosaurines, including Wendiceratops (A) showing 5 epiparietal pairs and broad midline ramus. Medusaceratops itself is marked by letter (F).

Among valid ceratopsids from the Judith River Formation, Medusaceratops can be directly distinguished from centrosaurine Avaceratops, and chasmosaurines Judiceratops and Spiclypeus based on its unique frill ornamentation. It differs from chasmosaurine Mercuriceratops based on its less unique squamosal bone, as evident from newly described squamosal bones of Medusaceratops. All material previously assigned to the centrosaurine Albertaceratops from the formation is now assigned to Medusaceratops or considered too fragmentary.

The cladogram presented below follows a phylogenetic analysis by Chiba et al. (2017) who redescribed Medusaceratops as a centrosaurine:

- Centrosaurinae
  - - Diabloceratops eatoni
    - Machairoceratops cronusi
  - - Nasutoceratopsini
      - Avaceratops lammersi (ANSP 15800)
      - MOR 692
      - CMN 8804
      - Nasutoceratops titusi
      - Malta new taxon
    - - Xenoceratops foremostensis
      - - - Sinoceratops zhuchengensis
          - Wendiceratops pinhornensis
        - Albertaceratops nesmoi
        - Medusaceratops lokii
        - Eucentrosaura
          - Centrosaurini
          - Pachyrhinosaurini

== See also ==
- Timeline of ceratopsian research
