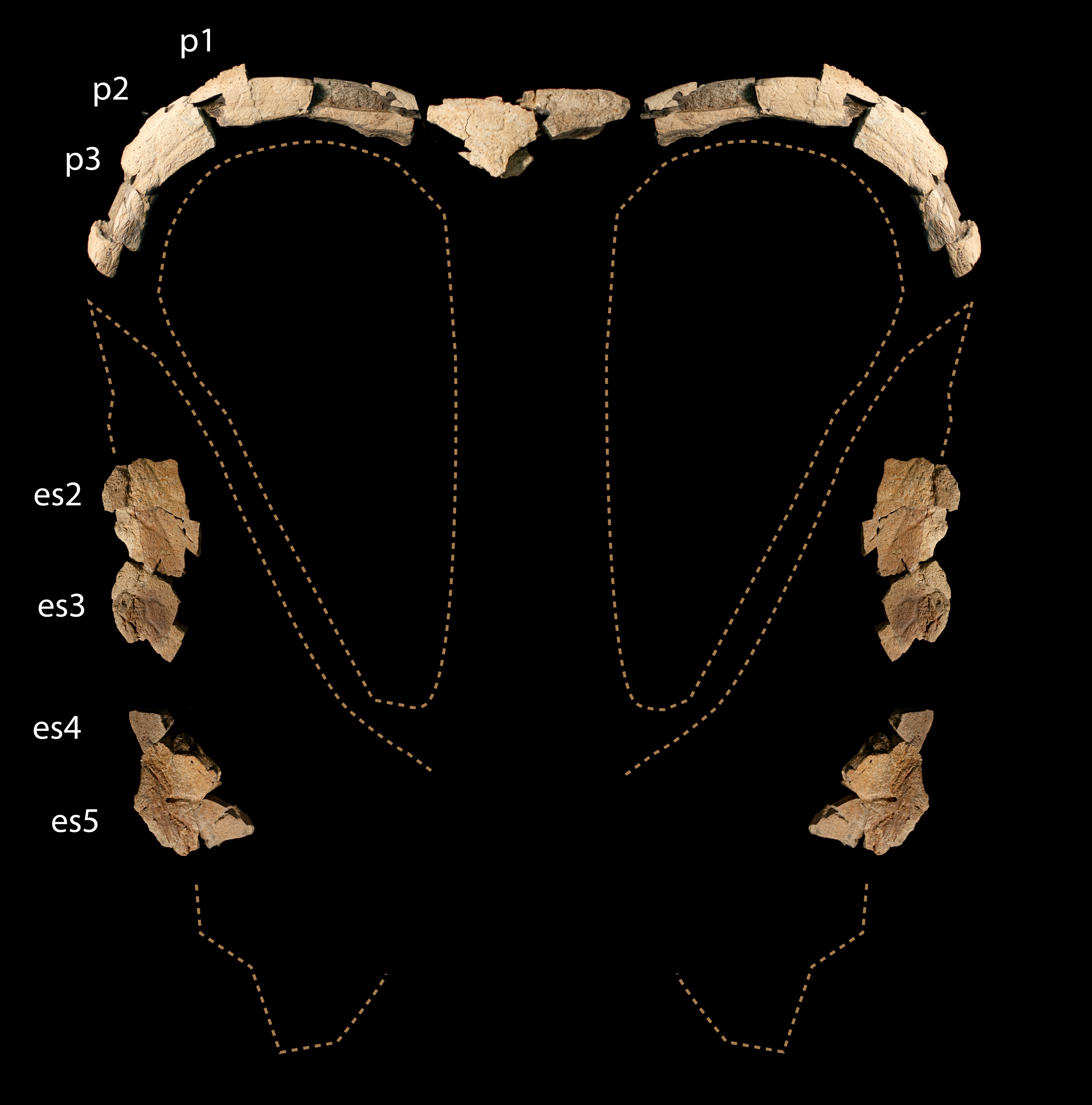
- Frill

Scientific classification
- Domain: Eukaryota
- Kingdom: Animalia
- Phylum: Chordata
- Clade: Dinosauria
- Clade: †Ornithischia
- Family: †Ceratopsidae
- Subfamily: †Chasmosaurinae
- Genus: †Judiceratops; Longrich, 2013
- Species: †J. tigris

Binomial name
- †Judiceratops tigris Longrich, 2013

= Judiceratops =

Judiceratops Temporal range: Late Cretaceous, 78–77.5 Ma

Extinct genus of dinosaurs

Judiceratops (/ˌdʒuːdiːˈsɛrətɒps/ JOO-dee-SERR-ə-tops; meaning "Judith River horned face") is an extinct horned dinosaur. It lived around 78 million years ago, during the Late Cretaceous Period in what is now Montana, United States. Like other horned dinosaurs, Judiceratops was a large, quadrupedal herbivore. It is the oldest known chasmosaurine.

== Discovery ==
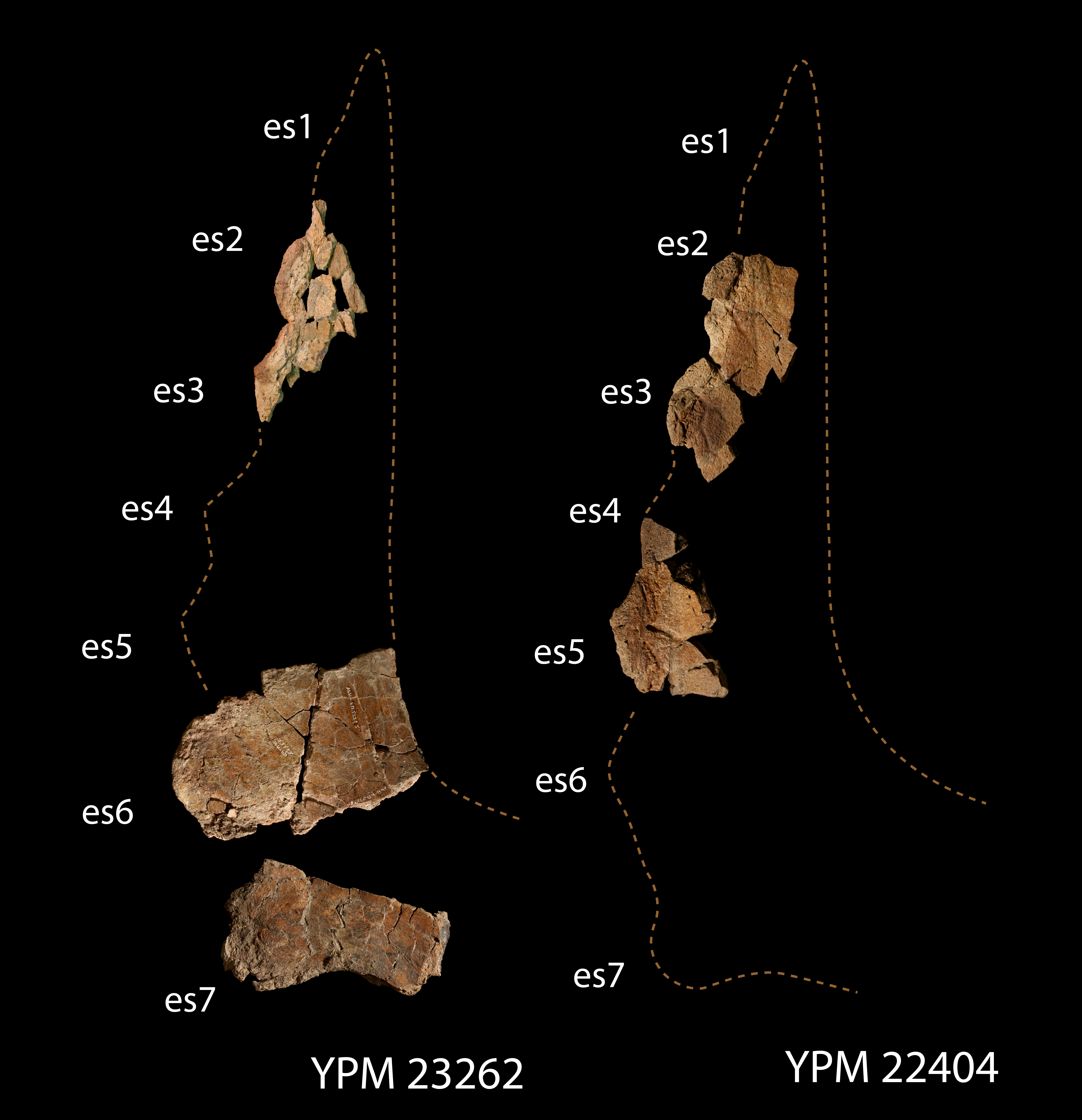
Squamosals of the type and referred specimens of Judiceratops

The holotype YPM VPPU 022404 consists of an incomplete skull including the horns, parts of the frills, and fragments from the back of the frill. Judiceratops shows a distinctive combination of characters, not seen in other ceratopsids. The postorbital (located above the eyes) horns are moderately elongate, inclined forward and outwards, and have an unusual teardrop-shaped cross section.Other fragmentary specimens are known from the same area, which preserve distinctive features of the frill.

A referred specimen, YPM VPPU 023262, overlaps the holotype in two areas, including the distal blade of the squamosal, and the postorbital horns. It resembles the holotype in several features, including the shape of the marginal hornlets and the concave lateral margin of the distal blade. Critically, it shares the same unusual horn shape seen in the holotype, supporting referral of the two fossils to the same species, and it helps to provide additional information on the anatomy of Judiceratops. It shows that the animal had large scallops on the frill's proximal margins, and a very broad, platelike bar in the center of the frill.

== Description ==
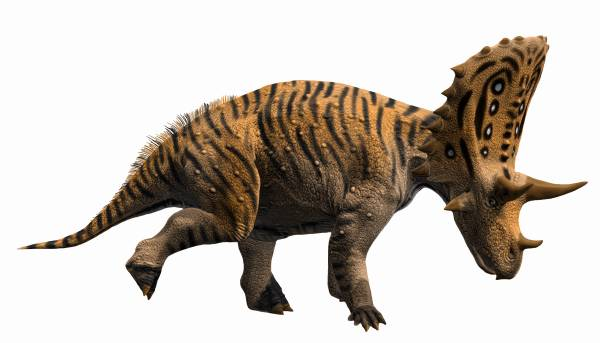
Life restoration

Its frill (parietal bone) has a broad midline bar, a rounded caudal margin, and reduced osteoderms (bony projections) on the rear edge of the frill, the epiparietals. The osteoderms on the lateral margins of the frill are large near the front, but small towards the back.

== Classification ==
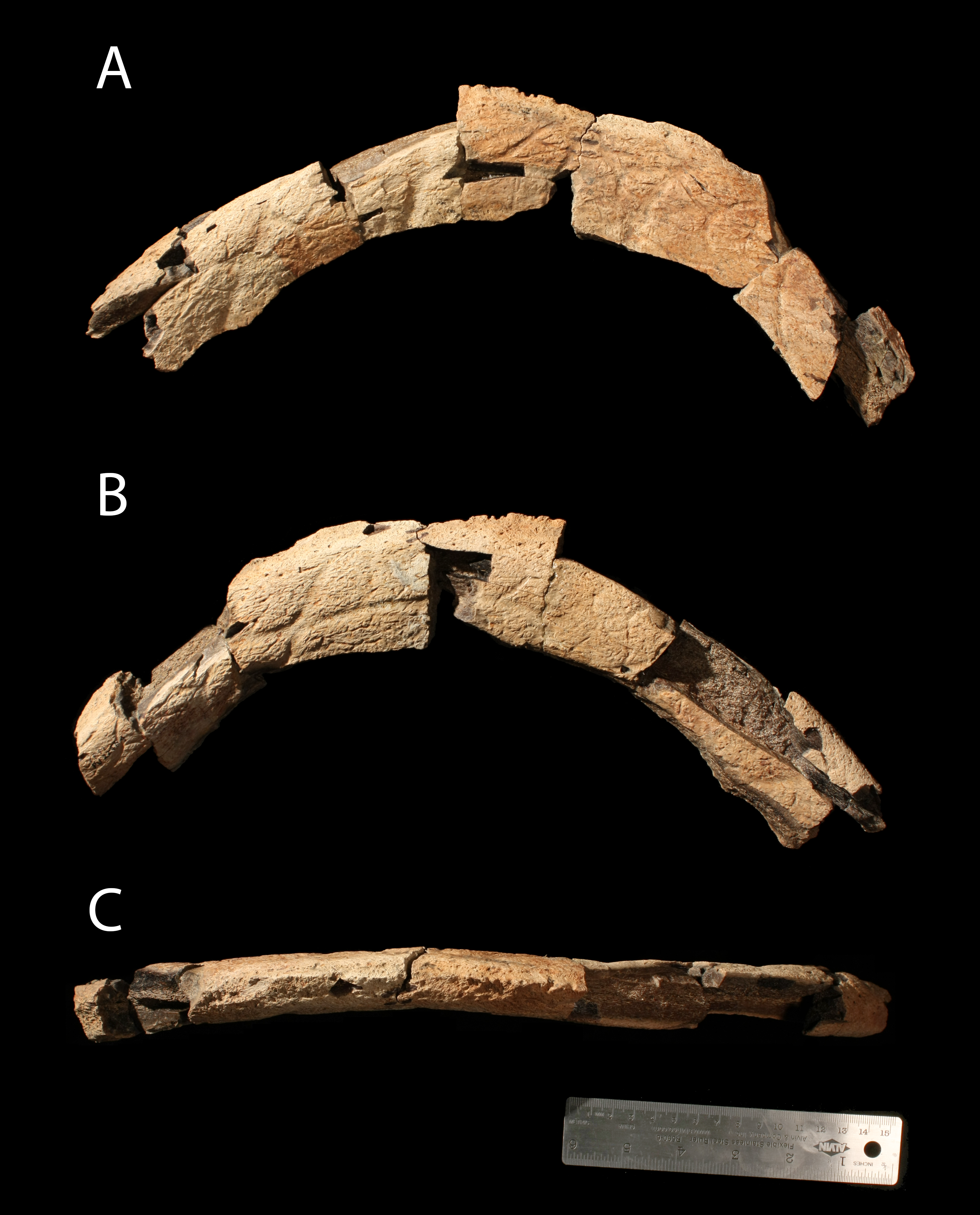
Posterior of the frill (parietal bone) of Judiceratops, holotype. A, dorsal view, B, ventral view, C, posterior view. The epoccipital hornlets are very low and fused to the back of the frill, forming low keels

Judiceratops is a basal chasmosaurine. It is more primitive than most genera within the subfamily with the exception of Mercuriceratops. The below cladogram follows Longrich (2015), who named a new species of Pentaceratops, and included nearly all species of chasmosaurine.

- Chasmosaurinae
  - Mercuriceratops
  - - Judiceratops
    - - - Chasmosaurus
          - Chasmosaurus sp. CMN 2280
          - - Chasmosaurus belli
            - Chasmosaurus irvinensis
        - Mojoceratops
      - - Agujaceratops
        - - - Pentaceratops aquilonius
            - Williams Fork chasmosaur
            - - Pentaceratops sternbergii
              - Utahceratops
          - - Kosmoceratops
              - Kosmoceratops richardsoni
              - Kosmoceratops sp. CMN 8301
            - - - Anchiceratops
                - Almond Formation chasmosaur
              - - - Bravoceratops
                  - Coahuilaceratops
                - - Arrhinoceratops
                  - Triceratopsini
                    - Titanoceratops
                    - - Torosaurus
                      - Triceratops
                        - T. utahensis
                        - - T. horridus
                          - T. prorsus

Despite the fragmentary nature of the fossils, they can be identified as a distinct species. Frills of horned dinosaurs are highly distinctive, with different species having distinct arrangements of the epoccipital hornlets. From species to species, hornlets differed in their number, arrangement, size, and shape, and the bones of the frill, the squamosal and parietal, differ as well. This probably reflects rapid evolution of the frill in response to sexual selection, similar to how sexual selection creates a large variety of display feathers in living dinosaurs such as birds of paradise.

=== Evolution ===
Judiceratops is the oldest known member of the Chasmosaurinae, but already shows many of the distinctive features of the group including the long, concave squamosals and pointed epioccipitals. Along with the presence of specialized centrosaurines such as Albertaceratops at the same time, it suggests rapid evolution of the horned dinosaurs between the Turonian (when the oldest horned dinosaur in North America, Zuniceratops, appears) and the middle Campanian, when Chasmosaurinae and Centrosaurinae show up in the fossil record. This period spans about 15 million years- a relatively short period in terms of dinosaur evolution, suggesting rapid evolution.

Although Judiceratops is currently the oldest known chasmosaurine, it does not seem to be ancestral to later horned dinosaurs such as Chasmosaurus and Pentaceratops. Instead the specialized features of the frill- the large winglike hornlets on the margins of the frill, and the reduced ones on the back- show that it represents a side branch in chasmosaurine evolution. No fossils from this lineage are known from later rocks, consistent with a pattern of high turnover- species rapidly evolved, and became extinct- as seen in other horned dinosaurs in the latest Cretaceous. Its precise relationships to other members of the group are unclear, but given its relatively early appearance and the lack of features clearly linking it to later members of the Chasmosaurinae, it seems to represent a deep divergence within Chasmosaurinae.

== Paleoecology ==
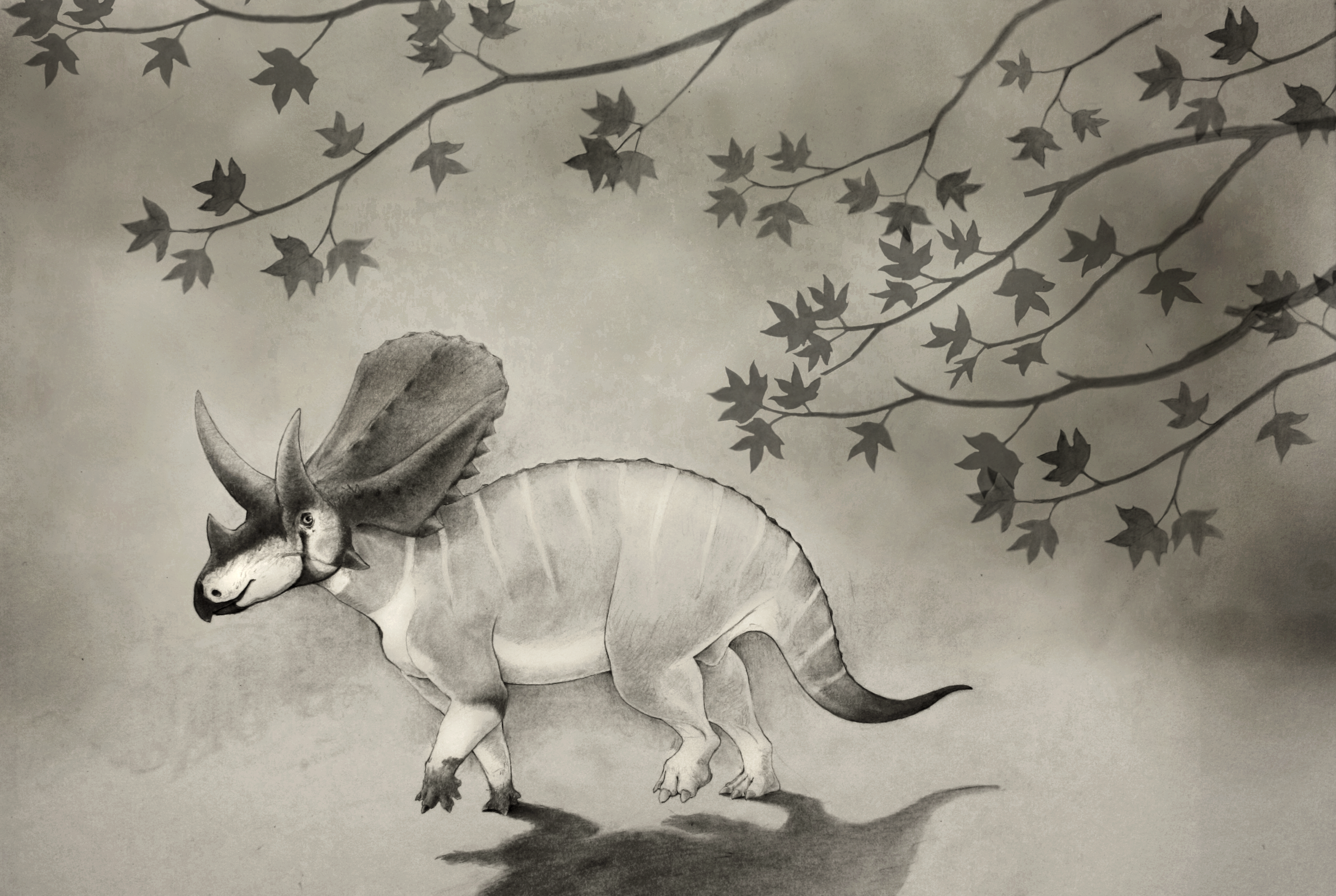
Restoration

The remains of the holotype specimen of Judiceratops YPM VPPU 022404 were recovered from the Judith River Formation in Hill County, Montana. The specimen was collected in brown/green mudstone and gray/yellow sandstone which dates to the Campanian stage of Late Cretaceous period, approximately 78 million years ago. This specimen is housed at the Yale Peabody Museum. Judiceratops shared its paleoenvironment with bony fishes, amphibians, the Choristoderan Champsosaurus, the hadrosaur Brachylophosaurus canadensis, the pachycephalosaur Colepiocephale lambei, the theropods Dromaeosaurus, Gorgosaurus and Troodon, and with fellow ceratopsians Albertaceratops, Medusaceratops and Avaceratops.

== See also ==
- Timeline of ceratopsian research
