= Claggett Shale =

Geological formation in Montana

- Stratigraphic range: Late Cretaceous, Campanian
- Type: Geological formation
- Underlies: Judith River Formation

Location
- Region: North America

The Claggett Shale is a geological formation in Montana whose strata date back to the Late Cretaceous. Dinosaur remains are among the fossils that have been recovered from the formation.

== Vertebrate paleofauna ==
- Hesperornis altus? - "Tibiotarsus and vertebra." (possibly from the Judith River Formation)
- Hesperornis montana
- cf. Maiasaura
- Tyrannosauridae indet.

== See also ==
- List of dinosaur-bearing rock formations
