= Judith River Formation =

Fossil-bearing geologic formation in Montana, part of the Judith River Group

- Stratigraphic range: Campanian, 79–75.3 Ma
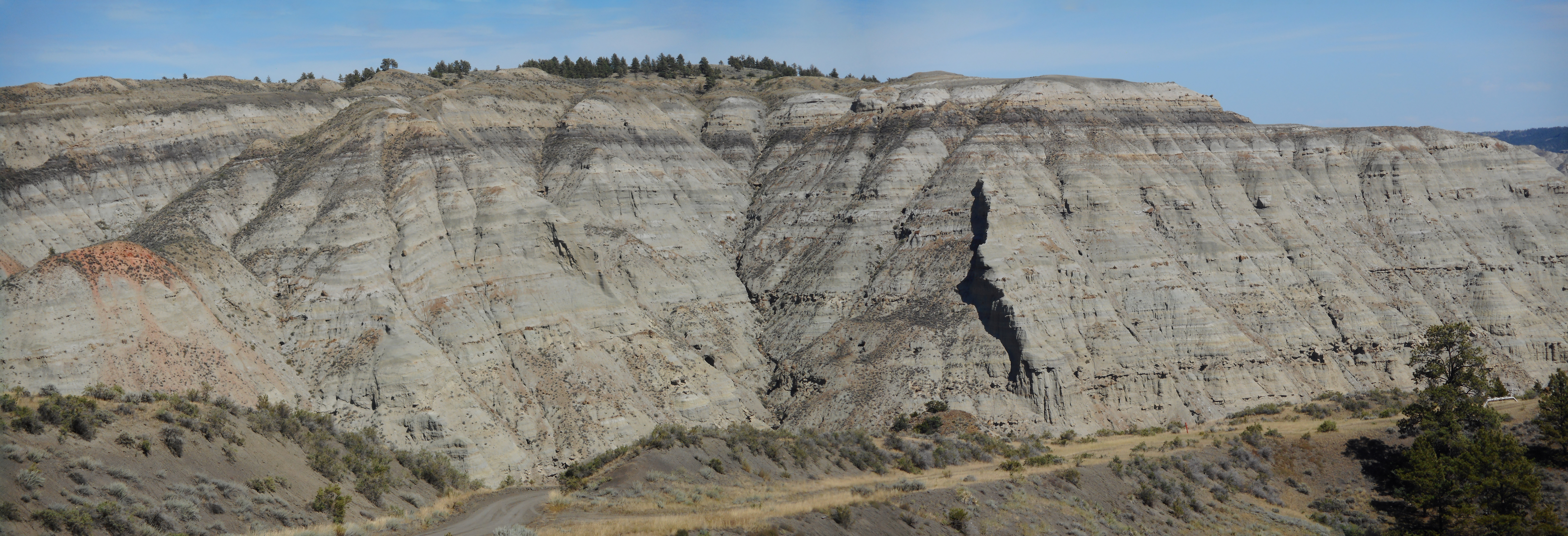
- Judith River Formation, Upper Missouri Breaks National Monument
- Type: Geological formation
- Unit of: Montana Group
- Sub-units: Parkman Sandstone Member, McClelland Ferry Member, Coal Ridge Member, Woodhawk Member
- Underlies: Bearpaw Formation
- Overlies: Claggett Formation, Pakowki Formation
- Thickness: max 360 meters (1,180 ft)

Lithology
- Primary: Mudstone and sandstone

Location
- Region: Alberta, Montana, South Dakota, Saskatchewan, Wyoming
- Country: Canada, United States

Type section
- Named for: Judith River near the confluence with the Missouri River
- Named by: F.V. Hayden, 1871; F.B. Meek, 1876.

The Judith River Formation is a fossil-bearing geologic formation in Montana, and is part of the Montana Group. It dates to the Late Cretaceous, between 79 and 75.3 million years ago, corresponding to the "Judithian" land vertebrate age. It was laid down during the same time period as portions of the Two Medicine Formation of Montana and the Oldman Formation of Alberta. It is an historically important formation, explored by early American paleontologists such as Edward Drinker Cope, who named several dinosaurs from scrappy remains found here on his 1876 expedition (such as Monoclonius). Modern work has found nearly complete skeletons of the hadrosaurid Brachylophosaurus.

== Lithology ==
The Judith River Formation is composed of mudstone, siltstone and sandstone. Coal beds, bentonite and coquinas are also observed.

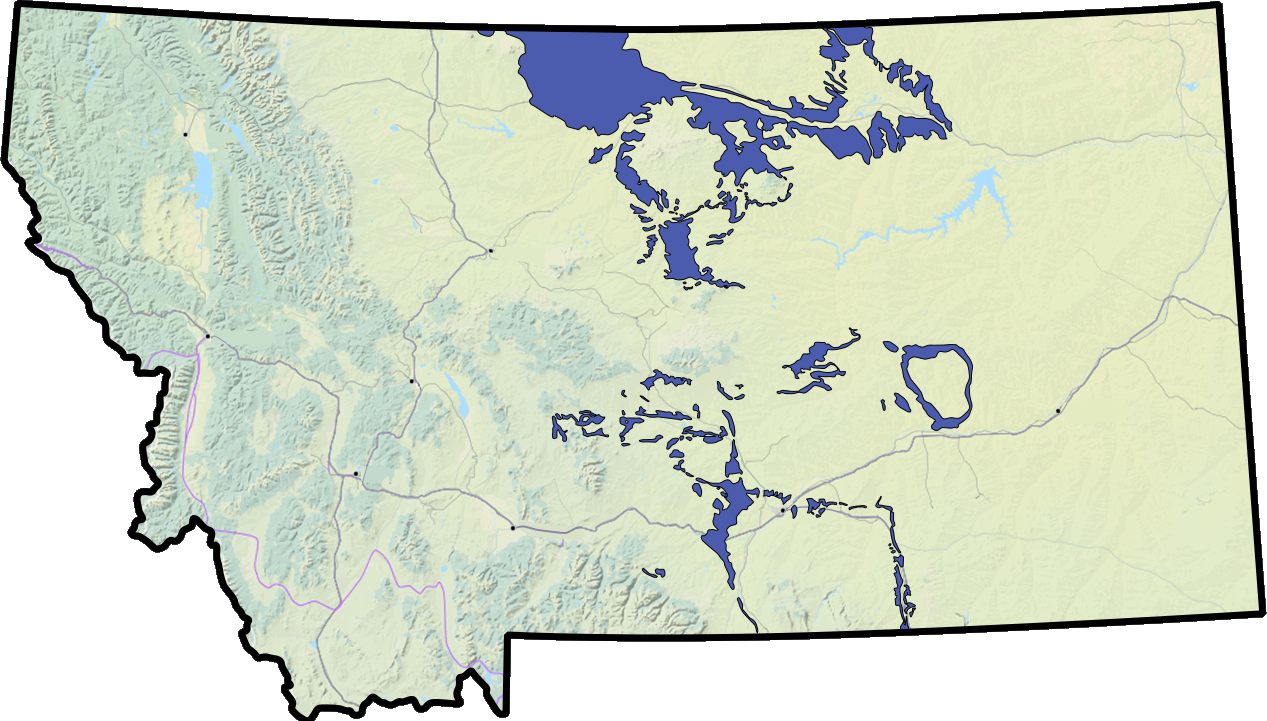
Surface exposures of the Judith River Formation from the USGS, map courtesy of OpenStreetMap.

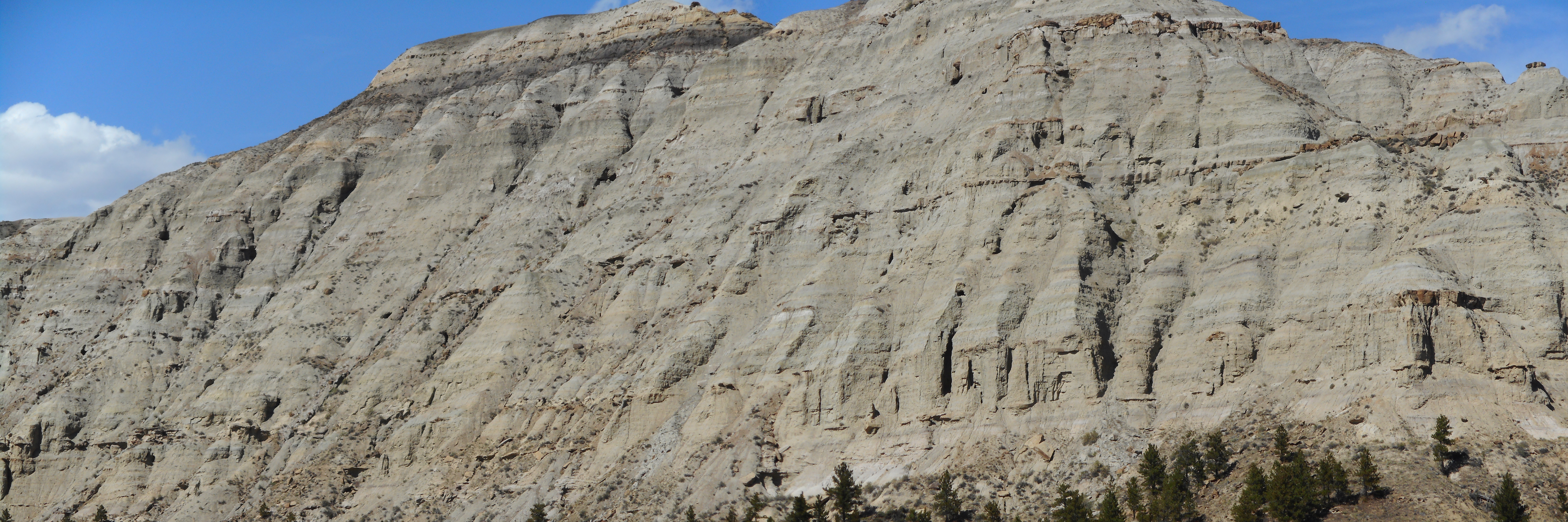
Judith River Formation, Upper Missouri Breaks National Monument

== Relationship with other units ==
The Judith River Formation conformably overlies the Claggett Formation and Pakowki Formation. It is overlain by the Bearpaw Formation. It is equivalent to the Belly River Formation in the southern Canadian Rockies foothills, the Lea Park Formation in central Alberta and the Wapiti Formation in the northwestern plains.

=== Sub-divisions ===
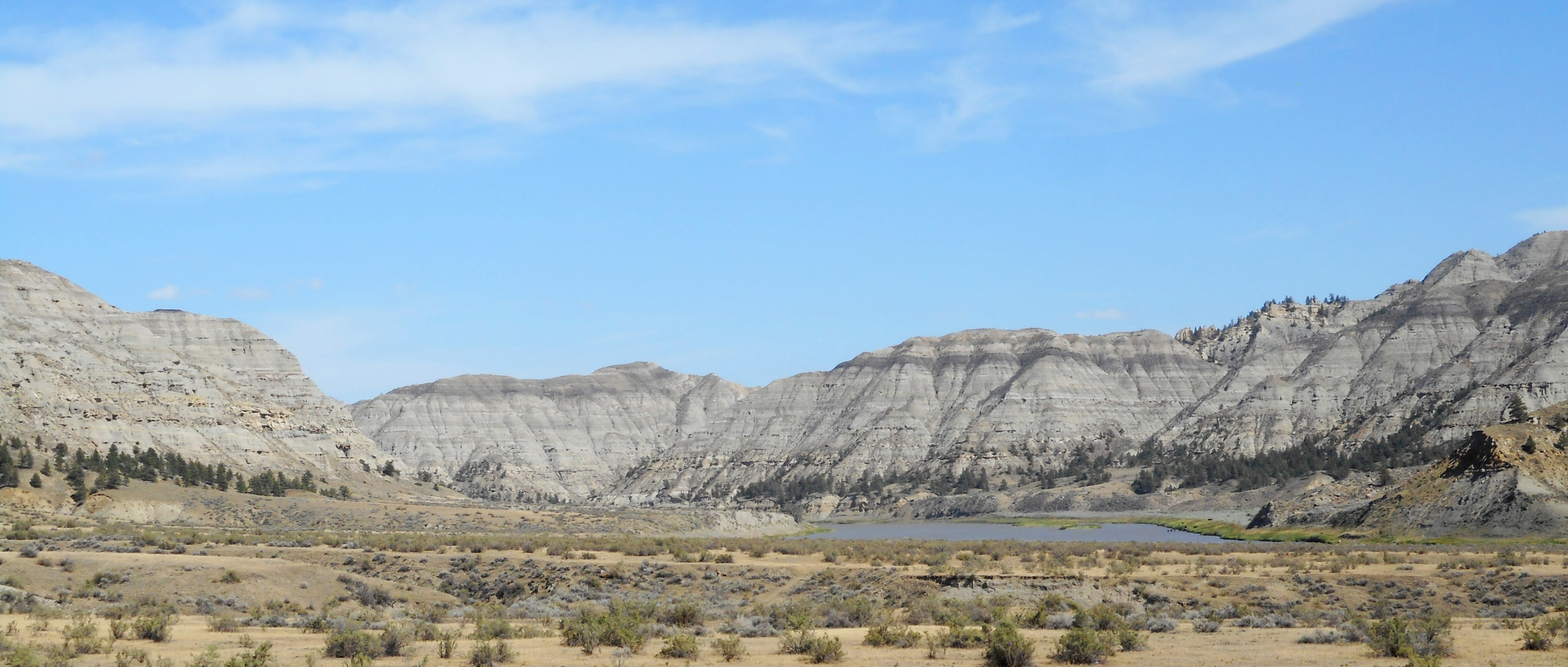
Missouri River carved through the Judith River Formation, Upper Missouri Breaks National Monument

The Judith River Formation is divided into four members, the Parkman Sandstone Member, the McClelland Ferry Member, the Coal Ridge member, and the Woodhawk Member. The McClelland Ferry Member (78.7-76.3 Ma) is believed to be equivalent to the Oldman Formation, with the Coal Ridge Member (76.3-75.3 Ma) equivalent to the Dinosaur Park Formation.

== Fauna ==
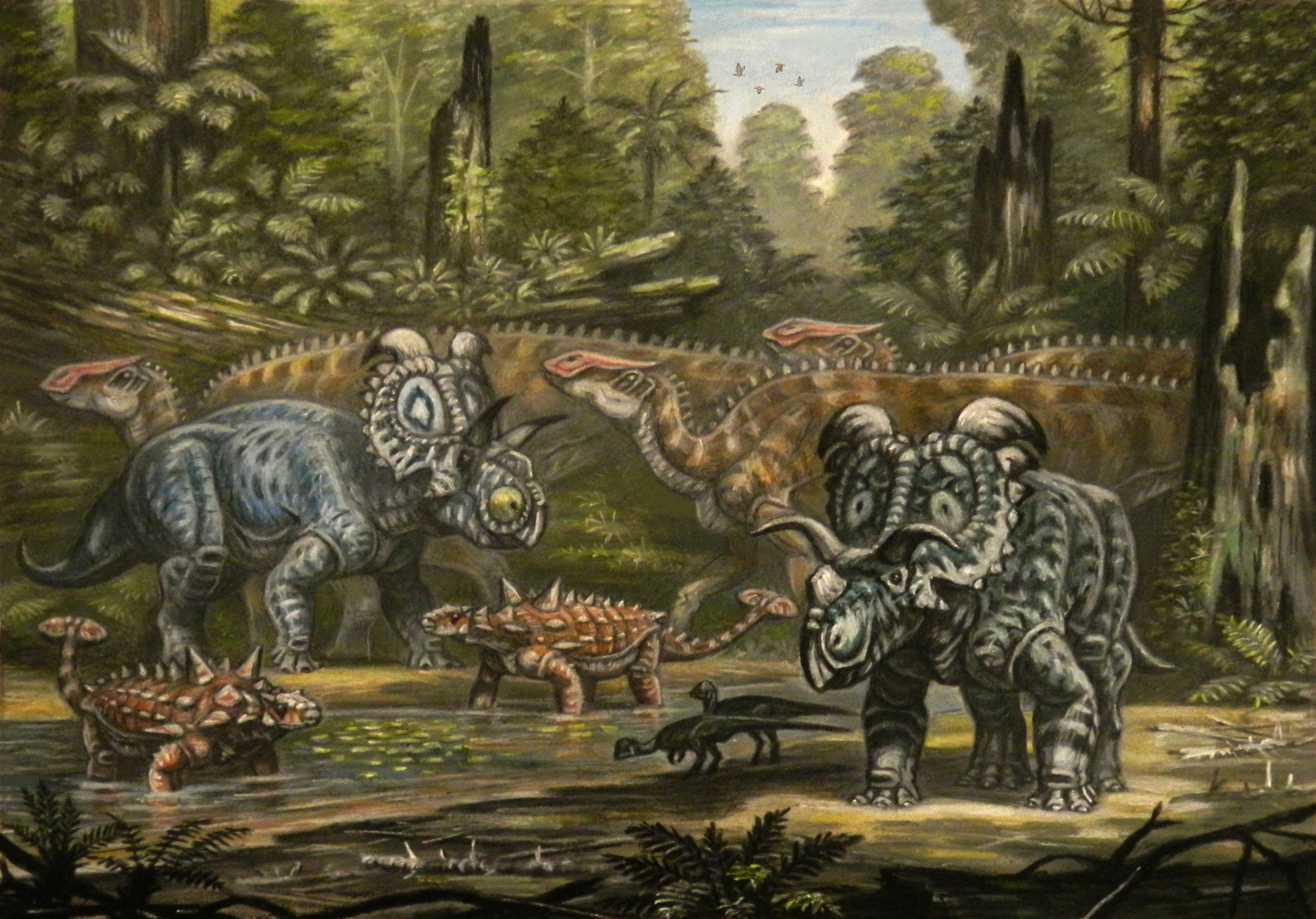
Dinosaurs of Judith River Formation

Faunal list follows a review published by Ashok Sahni in 1972 unless otherwise noted.

Color key: Taxon / Reclassified taxon / Taxon falsely reported as present / Dubious taxon or junior synonym / Ichnotaxon / Ootaxon / Morphotaxon

Notes
Uncertain or tentative taxa are in small text
~~crossed out~~ taxa are discredited.

=== Amphibians ===
There are three potential species of discoglossid frogs. Hip bones, possibly representing a North American member of the European spadefoot toad family are also known from the formation.

Amphibians of the Judith River Formation
Genus	Species	Location	Stratigraphic position	Abundance	Notes	Images
Habrosaurus	H. dilatus				A siren	
Lisserpeton	L. bairdi				A scapherpetonid salamander	
Nezpercius	N. dodsoni	Clambank Hollow			A frog known from a partial illium.	
Opisthotriton	O. kayi				A possible lungless salamander	
Prodesmodon	P. copei				A lungless salamander	
Scapherpeton	S. tectum				A scapherpetonid salamander	

=== Fish ===
==== Bony fish ====
Bony fishes of the Judith River Formation
Genus	Species	Location	Stratigraphic position	Abundance	Notes	Images
Arotus	A. hieroglyphus				A holostean.	
Belonostomus	Belonostomus longirostris				An aspidorhynchiform.	The holotype of Priscosturion, MOR 1184
Cyclurus	C. fragosus				A bowfin.	The holotype of Priscosturion, MOR 1184
Lepisosteus	L. occidentalis			Scales	A gar.	The holotype of Priscosturion, MOR 1184
?Paralbula	?P. sp.				A bonefish.	The holotype of Priscosturion, MOR 1184
Priscosturion	P. longipinnis	McClelland Ferry	Upper Campanian		A sturgeon.	The holotype of Priscosturion, MOR 1184
Psammorhynchus	P. longipinnis	McClelland Ferry	Upper Campanian		Preoccupied name, renamed Priscosturion.	The holotype of Priscosturion, MOR 1184
Polyodontidae	Indeterminate				A paddlefish. Known remains exceeded size of Chinese paddlefish, total length would exceed 2 metres (6.6 ft).	The holotype of Priscosturion, MOR 1184

==== Cartilaginous fish ====
Cartilaginous fishes of the Judith River Formation
Genus	Species	Location	Stratigraphic position	Abundance	Notes	Images
Myledaphus	M. bipartitus				A stingray.	
Cretalamna	C. sp	Montana			An Otodontid shark	
Carcharias	Carcharias sp.				A sand tiger shark	
Squalicorax	S.kaupi				An Anacoracid shark	

=== Plesiosaurs ===
Plesiosaurs of the Judith River Formation
Genus	Species	Location	Stratigraphic position	Abundance	Notes	Images
Plesiosauria	Plesiosauria indet.					

=== Pterosaurs ===
Pterosaurs of the Judith River Formation
Genus	Species	Location	Stratigraphic position	Abundance	Notes	Images
?Quetzalcoatlus		Hidden Valley Quarry				
Pterosauria	indet	JDM Quarry	McClelland Ferry			A pterosaur metacarpal from the JDM quarry

=== Choristoderes ===
Choristoderes of the Judith River Formation
Genus	Species	Location	Stratigraphic position	Abundance	Notes	Images
Champsosaurus	C. sp.					Champsosaurus

=== Crocodylomorphs ===
Crocodylomorphs of the Judith River Formation
Genus	Species	Location	Stratigraphic position	Abundance	Notes	Images
Brachychampsa	B. montana				An alligatorid.	Brachychampsa
Leidyosuchus	L. canadensis				An alligatoroid.	
Deinosuchus	D. hatcheri			Two giant dorsal vertebrae and a number of osteoderms.	An enormous eusuchian.	Deinosuchus

=== Lizards ===
Lizards of the Judith River Formation
Genus	Species	Location	Stratigraphic position	Abundance	Notes	Images
Chamops	C. segnis				A whiptail.	
Exostinus	E. lancensis				A knob-scaled lizard.	
Leptochamops	L. denticulatus				A whiptail.	
Paraderma	P. bogerti				A parasaniwid.	
Parasaniwa	P. wyomingensis				A parasaniwid.	

=== Ornithischians ===
==== Ankylosaurs ====
Ankylosaurs reported from the Judith River Formation
Genus	Species	Location	Member	Material	Notes	Images
Edmontonia	E. longiceps			Isolated teeth	A nodosaurid.	Edmontonia
Zuul	Z. crurivastator		middle Coal Ridge	Cranial and postcranial skeletal remains and soft tissue, type specimen	An ankylosaurid.	Zuul

==== Hadrosaurs ====
Hadrosaurs reported from the Judith River Formation
Genus	Species	Location	Member	Material	Notes	Images
Brachylophosaurus	B. canadensis		middle McClelland Ferry		A hadrosaurid which was one of the more common dinosaurs in the area.	Brachylophosaurus
Corythosaurus	C. sp.		middle Coal Ridge	two partial skeletons	A lambeosaurine hadrosaurid	Corythosaurus
Probrachylophosaurus	P. bergei		lower McClelland Ferry		A brachylophosaurin hadrosaur	Probrachylophosaurus

==== Marginocephalians ====
===== Ceratopsians =====
Ceratopsians reported from the Judith River Formation
Genus	Species	Location	Member	Material	Notes	Images
Albertaceratops	A. nesmoi				Reclassified as Medusaceratops lokii	
Avaceratops	A. lammersi		lower McClelland Ferry	"[Two] partial skulls, skeleton, juvenile," type specimen	A ceratopsid. Possibly dubious.	Avaceratops
Chasmosaurinae	gen. et sp. nov.			A mostly complete skull	MOR 11940, An unnamed Chasmosaur housed at the Museum of the Rockies.	The skull of the new Chasmosaurine in lateral (side view).
Furcatoceratops	F. elucidans	Fergus County, Montana	Upper Coal Ridge	Nearly complete subadult skeleton.	A ceratopsid	Furcatoceratops
Judiceratops	J. tigris		lower McClelland Ferry		A ceratopsid	Judiceratops
Lokiceratops	L. rangiformis	Kennedy Coulee	lower McClelland Ferry	Disarticulated, associated skeleton including most of the skull and fragmentary postcrania	A ceratopsid	Lokiceratops
Medusaceratops	M. lokii		lower McClelland Ferry	Bonebed	A ceratopsid	Medusaceratops
Mercuriceratops	M. gemini		lower Coal Ridge	"one apomorphic squamosal"	A ceratopsid	Mercuriceratops
Spiclypeus	S. shipporum		McClelland Ferry	Partial skull, vertebrae, ribs, humerus, ilium, femur, tibia, and fibula.	A ceratopsid	Spiclypeus

===== Pachycephalosaurs =====
Pachycephalosaurs reported from the Judith River Formation
Genus	Species	Location	Member	Material	Notes	Images
Colepiocephale	C. lambei	Kennedy Coulee	lower McClelland Ferry	"nearly complete frontoparietal dome"	A pachycephalosaurid closely related to Stegoceras.	Colepiocephale
Hanssuesia	H. sternbergi				A pachycephalosaurid. Also present in the Dinosaur Park and Oldman Formations. Possible synonym of Stegoceras.	Hanssuesia

=== Theropods ===
==== Dromaeosaurs ====
Dromeosaurs reported from the Judith River Formation
Genus	Species	Location	Stratigraphic position	Material	Notes	Images
Dromaeosaurus	D. albertensis	Ox Hill Quarry, Careless Creek Quarry, Hidden Valley Quarry & Blackbird Ridge Quarry.	lower McClelland Ferry	Teeth	A dromaeosaurid, also found in the Dinosaur Park Formation	Dromaeosaurus
Saurornitholestes	S. langstoni	Careless Creek, Emily's Ankle, Top Cat, Hidden Valley & Blackbird Ridge quarries.	Lower McClelland Ferry	Numerous teeth	A dromaeosaurid	Saurornitholestes

==== Troodonts ====
Troodonts reported from the Judith River Formation
Genus	Species	Location	Stratigraphic position	Material	Notes	Images
Troodon	T. formosus	Antelope Head, Careless Creek, Emily's Ankle, Top Cat, Hidden Valley, Blackbird Ridge & Jensen Ranch quarries.		28 teeth	Teeth of a Small theropod distinct from those of tyrannosaurids	

==== Tyrannosaurs ====
Tyrannosaurs reported from the Judith River Formation
Genus	Species	Location	Stratigraphic position	Material	Notes	Images
Daspletosaurus	D. torosus		Coal Ridge	Maxilla	A large tyrannosaurid.	Daspletosaurus
Daspletosaurus	D. wilsoni	Jack's B2	lower Coal Ridge	Partial skull, cervical, sacral, and caudal vertebrae, and a rib, chevron, and first metatarsal	Originally considered to be a transitional species between D. torosus and D. horneri, though the validity of this claim has been questioned	Daspletosaurus
Daspletosaurus	D. sp.		Coal Ridge	Partial skeleton	While initially referred to D. torosus, it is more recently classified as Daspletosaurus sp. as it contains some characters in common with other named species of the genus as well as its own unique features. Furthermore, most of the skull is not preserved and is therefore missing many crucial features required for a specific classification	Daspletosaurus
Gorgosaurus	G. libratus			Postorbital	A large tyrannosaurid, also found in the Dinosaur Park Formation and possibly the Two Medicine Formation.	Gorgosaurus
?Tyrannosaurus	T. sp.	Fergus County		A Lacrimal	Found alongside a specimen of Deinosuchus, but may not be from the Judith River Formation	
Teratophoneini				Partial skull and skeleton		

==== Other theropods ====
Theropods reported from the Judith River Formation
Genus	Species	Location	Stratigraphic position	Material	Notes	Images
Hesperornis	H. altus			Partial tibiotarsus	One of the only known freshwater occurrences of a hesperornithid.	Hesperornis
Ornithomimosauria indet.	Indeterminate		Coal Ridge Member	A left and right dentary	A large ornithomimosaur with potential affinities to the Deinocheiridae	Skull reconstruction of the possible Judith River deinocheirid
Richardoestesia	R. gilmorei	Careless Creek, Emily's Ankle, Hidden Valley & Blackbird Ridge quarries.		12 teeth	A coelurosaur	

=== Dubious Taxa ===
Many early American dinosaur discoveries were made in the Judith River Formation, and most of the early taxa are considered nomina dubia today.

Turtles of the Judith River Formation
Genus	Species	Location	Stratigraphic position	Abundance	Notes	Images
Aublysodon	A. lateralis			"Isolated teeth," type specimen	Junior synonym of Deinodon horridus	
Aublysodon	A. mirandus			Teeth, type specimen	Possible junior synonym of Deinodon horridus	
Ceratops	C. montanus			"occipital condyle, paired horn cores," type specimen	A dubious ceratopsid	
Deinodon	D. falculus			Teeth	Isolated tyrannosaur teeth classified in the dubious genus Deinodon	
Deinodon	D. hazenianus			Teeth	Junior synonym of Deinodon horridus	
Deinodon	D. horridus			"Teeth," type specimen	Isolated tyrannosaur teeth that formed the basis of the dubious genus Deinodon	
Deinodon	D. incrassatus			Teeth	Junior synonym of Deinodon horridus	
Deinodon	D. lateralis				Junior synonym of Deinodon horridus	
Diclonius	D. calamarius			"Teeth."	Nomen dubium	
Diclonius	D. pentagonius			"Fragmentary dentary with teeth," type specimen	A dubious hadrosaurid	
Diclonius	D. perengulatus			"Teeth."	Nomen dubium	
Dromaeosaurus	D. explanatus			"Tooth."	Possible relative of Saurornitholestes	Dromaeosaurus
Dromaeosaurus	D. laevifrons			"Tooth."	Possible relative of Saurornitholestes	Dromaeosaurus
Dysganus	D. bicarinatus			"Isolated teeth."	Nomen dubium	
Dysganus	D. encaustus			"Single tooth and [five] tooth fragments." "Isolated teeth."	Nomen dubium	
Dysganus	D. haydenianus			"Isolated teeth."	Nomen dubium	
Dysganus	D. peiganus			"Tooth."	Nomen dubium	
~~Hadrosaurus~~	H. paucidens				A dubious hadrosaur, sometimes known as Lambeosaurus paucidens	
?"Kritosaurus"	?"K." breviceps				A dubious hadrosaurid	
Monoclonius	M. crassus		lower Coal Ridge	"[Five] skulls, [one] complete." Type specimen	A dubious ceratopsid	
Ornithomimus	O. tenuis			"Fragmentary metatarsal."	A possible troodontid or juvenile tyrannosaurid	
Palaeoscincus	P. costatus			"Tooth," type specimen	A dubious ankylosaur	
Paronychodon	P. lacustris			Teeth, type specimen	An indeterminate maniraptoran, also found in the Dinosaur Park, Milk River, and Kirtland Formations	
Pteropelyx	P. grallipes			"Skeleton lacking skull."	A dubious hadrosaurid	
Trachodon	T. mirabilis			Isolated teeth, type specimen	A dubious hadrosaurid	
Troodon	T. formosus	Antelope Head, Careless Creek, Emily's Ankle, Top Cat & Hidden Valley quarries.		Teeth (type specimen), egg	A troodontid, possibly dubious. A neotype from the Two Medicine Formation has been proposed.	Troodon
Zapsalis	Z. abradens			"Teeth," type specimen	A dromaeosaurid	

=== Turtles ===
Turtles of the Judith River Formation
Genus	Species	Location	Stratigraphic position	Abundance	Notes	Images
Adocus	A. sp.					
Aspideretoides	A. sp					
Aspideretoides	A. foveatus					
Axestemys	A. spledidus					
Basilemys	B. sp.				A Mesoamerican river turtle.	
Boremys	B. sp					
Boremys	B. pulchra					
Chelydridae	indet.					
Neuankylus	N. sp.					
Neuankylus	N. eximius					
Plesiobaena	P. antiqua					

== Flora ==
All the flora stated below is pulled from the PBDB.

=== Ferns ===
Ferns of the Judith River Formation
Genus	Species	Location	Stratigraphic position	Abundance	Notes	Images
Azollopsis	A. coccoides	Montana				
Azolla	A. simplex	Montana				
Biretisporites	B. deltoideus	Montana				
Baculatisporites	B. sp	Montana				
Cyathidites	C. sp	Montana				
Deltoidospora	D. diaphana	Montana				
Echinatisporis	E. sp	Montana				
Laevigatosporites	L. haardtii	Montana				
Todisporites	T. dubius	Montana				

=== Gymnosperms ===
==== Cycadophyta ====
Ferns of the Judith River Formation
Genus	Species	Location	Stratigraphic position	Abundance	Notes	Images
Cycadopites	C. fragilis	Montana				

==== Conifers ====
Ferns of the Judith River Formation
Genus	Species	Location	Stratigraphic position	Abundance	Notes	Images
Araucariales	Indeterminate	Montana				
Pityosporites	P. constrictus	Montana				
Taxodiaceaepollenites	T. hiatus	Montana				

=== Angiosperms ===
Ferns of the Judith River Formation
Genus	Species	Location	Stratigraphic position	Abundance	Notes	Images
Scabrastephanocolpites	S. lepidus	Montana				
Monosulcites	M. riparius	Montana				
Tubulifloridites	T. aedicula	Montana				
Erdtmanipollis	E. procumbentiformis	Montana				
Liliacidites	L. sp.	Montana				

== See also ==
- List of dinosaur-bearing rock formations
