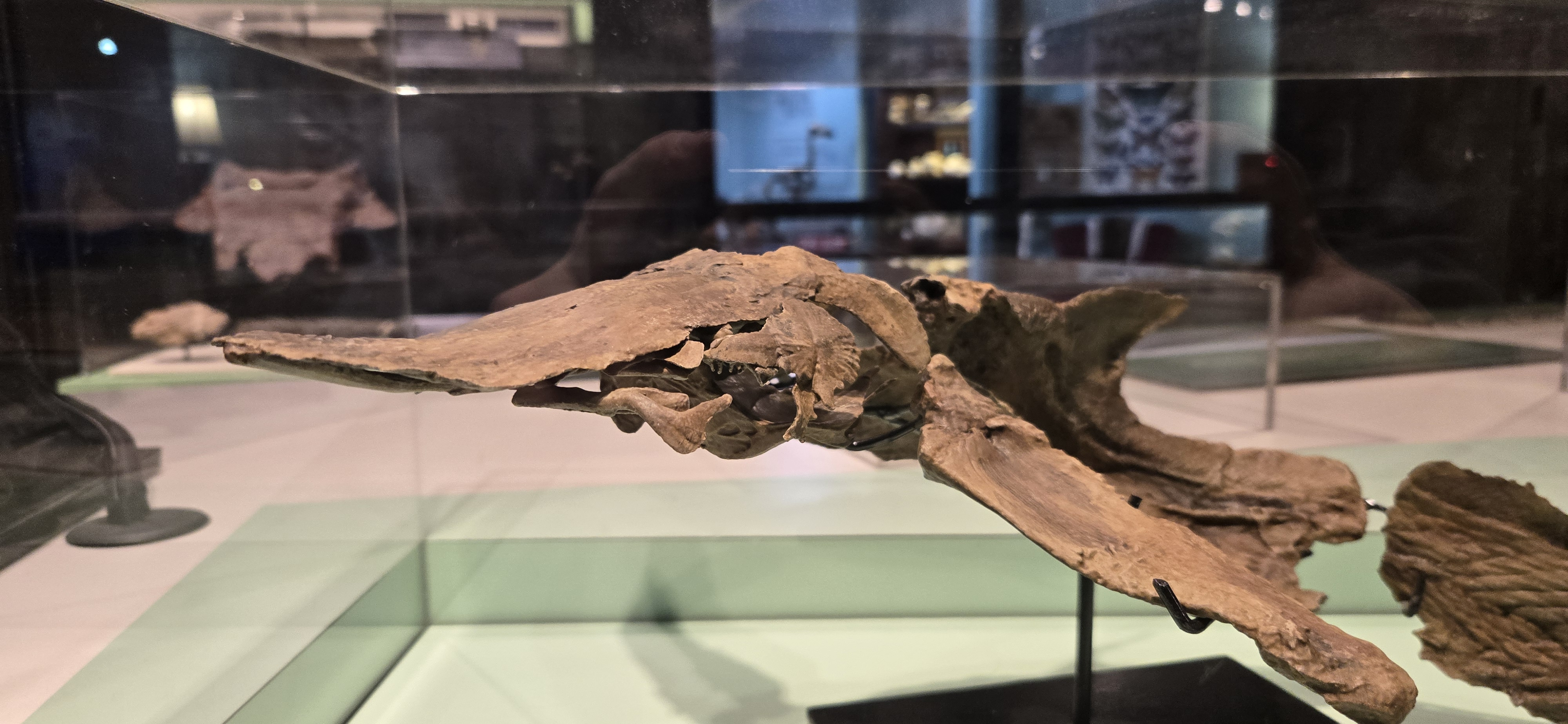
- The holotype of Priscosturion, MOR 1184

Scientific classification
- Kingdom: Animalia
- Phylum: Chordata
- Class: Actinopterygii
- Order: Acipenseriformes
- Family: Acipenseridae
- Subfamily: †Priscosturioninae; Grande and Hilton, 2009
- Genus: †Priscosturion; Grande and Hilton, 2009
- Species: †P. longipinnis

Binomial name
- †Priscosturion longipinnis (Grande and Hilton, 2006)

Synonyms
- Psammorhynchus Grande & Hilton, 2006

= Priscosturion =

Priscosturion Temporal range: Campanian

Genus of fishes

Priscosturion is a genus of sturgeon from the Judith River Formation. It lived during the Campanian stage of the Late Cretaceous, some 77.5 million years ago. Initially called Psammorhynchus, its describers Lance Grande and Eric J. Hilton renamed the animal in 2009. The fish belongs to the subfamily Priscosturioninae within the larger family Acipenseridae. Priscosturion is only known from one species, P. longipinnis.

== Description ==
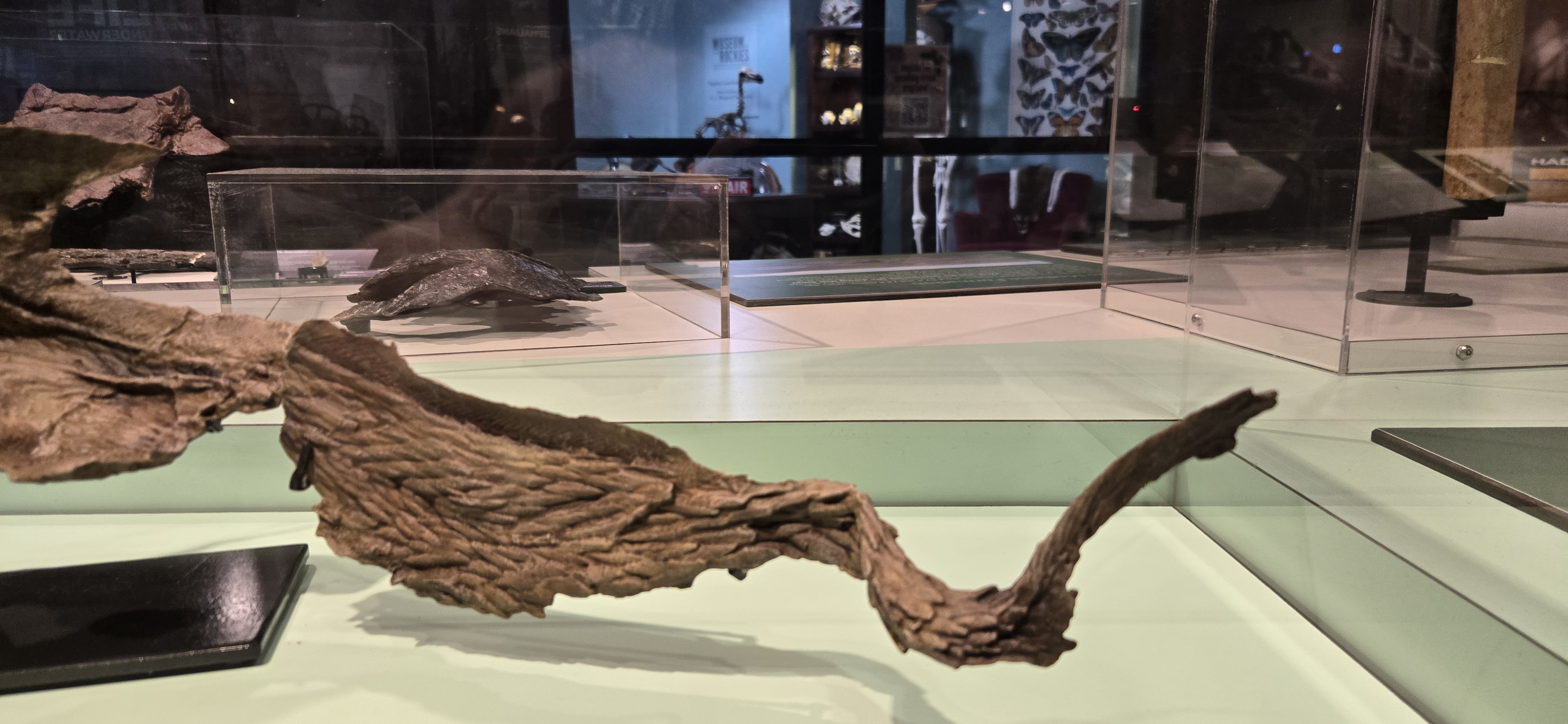
The rear portion of the holotype

Priscosturion was around 800 millimetres (31 in) in overall length. Its type specimen is rather complete. It is notable for its rather robust vertebrae.
