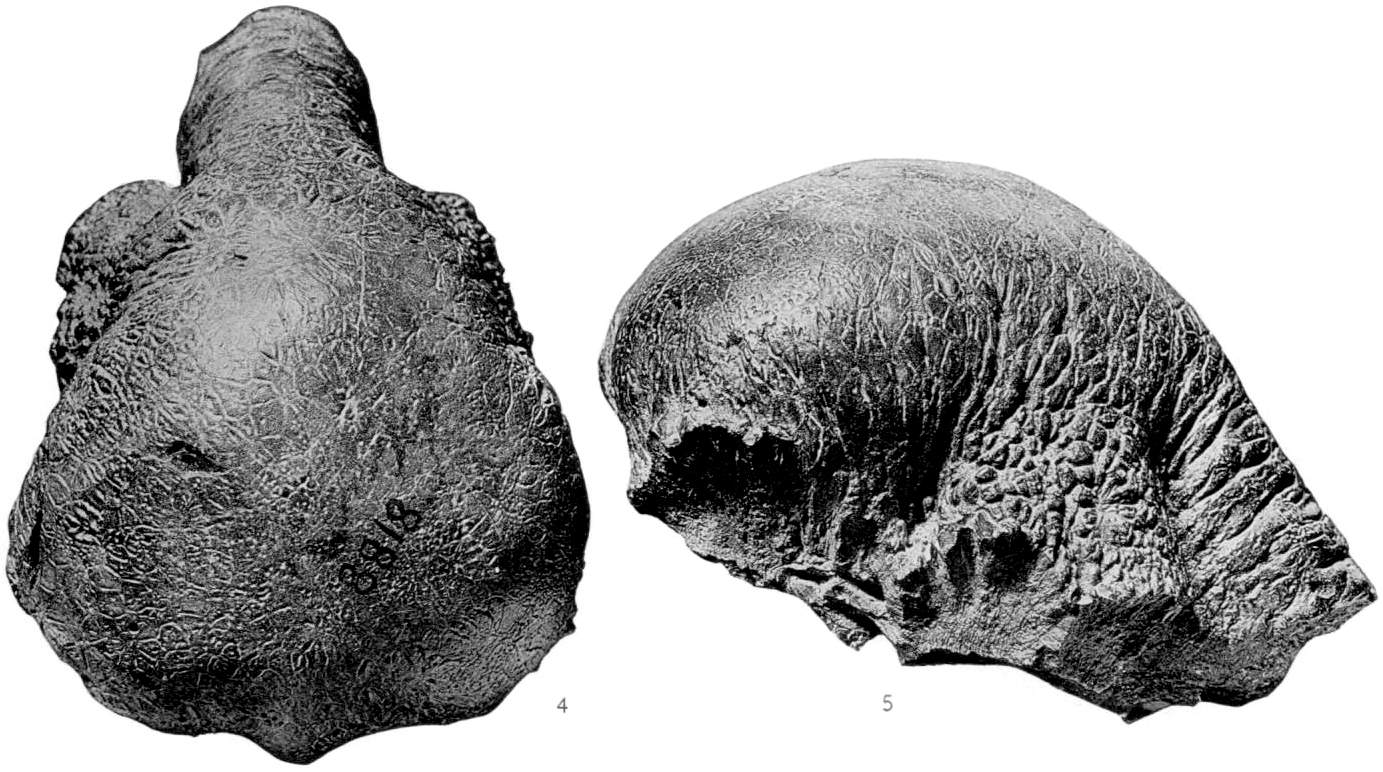
- Holotype skull CMN 8818

Scientific classification
- Kingdom: Animalia
- Phylum: Chordata
- Class: Reptilia
- Clade: Dinosauria
- Clade: †Ornithischia
- Clade: †Pachycephalosauria
- Family: †Pachycephalosauridae
- Genus: †Colepiocephale; Sullivan, 2003
- Species: †C. lambei

Binomial name
- †Colepiocephale lambei (Sternberg, 1945)

Synonyms
- Stegoceras lambei Sternberg, 1945

= Colepiocephale =

Colepiocephale Temporal range: Late Cretaceous, 80.45–78 Ma

Extinct genus of dinosaurs

Colepiocephale (meaning "knucklehead") is a genus of pachycephalosaurid dinosaur from Late Cretaceous (middle Campanian stage) deposits of Alberta, Canada. It was collected from the Foremost Formation. The type species, C. lambei, was originally described by Sternberg in 1945 as Stegoceras lambei, and later renamed by Sullivan in 2003. C. lambei is a domed pachycephalosaur characterized principally by the lack of a lateral and posteriosquamosal shelf, a steeply down-turned parietal, and the presence of two incipient nodes tucked under the posterior margin of the parietosquamosal border.

== History of naming ==
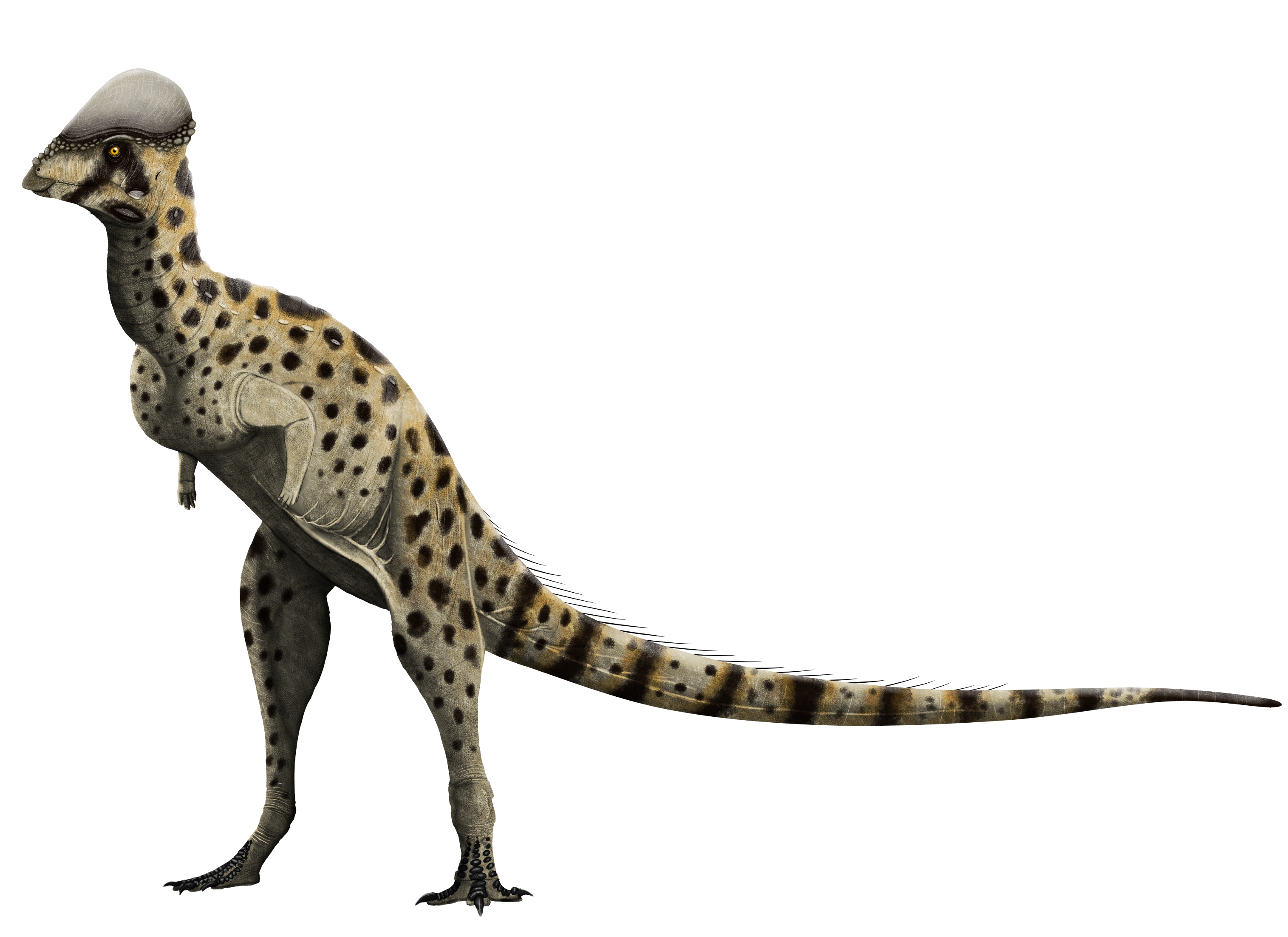
Life reconstruction

In 1923, a partial skull was collected from the Oldman Formation of Alberta by E.J. Whitaker, as the only fossil found at a locality 4.8 km (3 mi) below Bow Island ferry along the South Saskatchewan River and 61–91 m (200–300 ft) below the top of the Oldman Formation. It was acquired by the Geological Survey of Canada where it gained the accession number GSC No. 8818. GSC 8818 was first described by American palaeontologists Barnum Brown and Erich Maren Schlaikjer in 1943 as a specimen of the pachycephalosaur Troodon validus, which had earlier been given the name Stegoceras validus but was not believed to be a distinct genus by Brown and Schlaijker. This identification was disputed by American palaeontologist Charles Mortram Sternberg in 1945, who showed that Troodon, for a time believed to be a pachycephalosaur, was instead a carnivorous theropod, who as a result revived Stegoceras as well as named the new family Pachycephalosauridae to house pachycephalosaurs. Sternberg also recognized that GSC 8818 was a separate species from S. validus, and created the new species Stegoceras lambei with GSC 8818 as the holotype. The species name was in honour of the deceased Canadian palaeontologist Lawrence M. Lambe.

The separation of S. lambei from S. validum was not supported by the 1987 study of American palaeontologists Hans-Dieter Sues and British palaeontologist Peter Galton, who considered the two species as synonyms. However, American paleontologists Thomas E. Williamson and Thomas D. Carr chose to retain S. lambei as separate in 2002, finding it as a close relative of S. validum and Stegoceras sternbergi and more distantly related to Stegoceras breve. These species and the general taxonomy of Stegoceras was reviewed in 2003 by American palaeontologist Robert M. Sullivan, who found that S. lambei was closer to Pachycephalosaurus than Stegoceras and chose to give it the new genus name Colepiocephale. The name is a combination of the Latin word colepium, "knuckle", in reference to the curled knuckle-like appearance of the dome, and the Ancient Greek κεφαλή (cephale) meaning "head". The accession number for the holotype had also changed by this time to CMN 8818, as it was now held in the Canadian Museum of Nature. Along with the holotype, 13 other specimens were referred to Colepiocephale lambei, held variously in the CMN, Royal Ontario Museum, Royal Tyrrell Museum of Palaeontology, and the University of Alberta Laboratory of Vertebrate Palaeontology, and all these specimens come from the Foremost Formation, part of the historical Oldman Formation. Being from the Foremost, Colepiocephale would be one of the oldest pachycephalosaurs from North America, from the early Campanian.

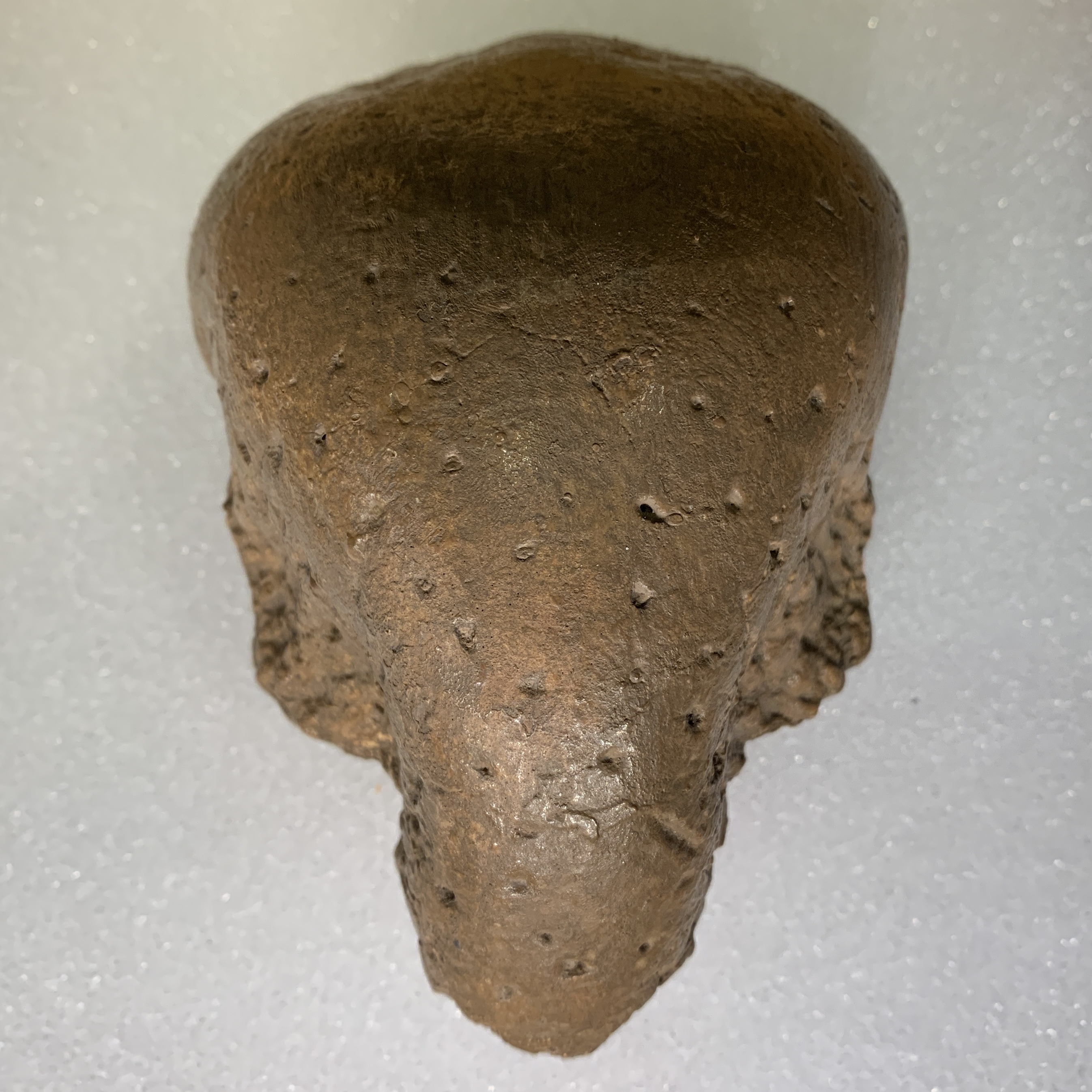
Dome at Royal Tyrrell Museum

A redescription and revision of Colepiocephale was published by Canadian palaeontologists Ryan K. Schott and David C. Evans, and Williamson, Carr and Mark B. Goodwin in 2009, including identifying the first specimen of the taxon from the Judith River Formation of Montana. The distinctiveness of Colepiocephale was supported, as well as its status as an older genus, with the Judith River specimen from sediments in Kennedy Coulee that are approximately 78 million years old, while the specimens of the Foremost are between 79.79 and 80.45 million years old. 31 specimens from the Foremost are identifiable as pachycephalosaurs, and all of them, where complete enough, show the features diagnostic to Colepiocephale suggesting it was the only pachycephalosaur within its time and space interval. This gives the possibility that other age-equivalent specimens from Judith River could be part of the genus, though their identification is uncertain.
