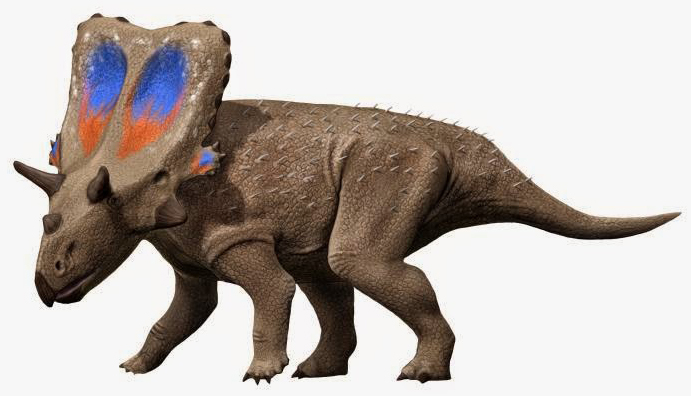
- Restoration

Scientific classification
- Domain: Eukaryota
- Kingdom: Animalia
- Phylum: Chordata
- Clade: Dinosauria
- Clade: †Ornithischia
- Family: †Ceratopsidae
- Subfamily: †Chasmosaurinae
- Genus: †Mercuriceratops; Ryan et al., 2014
- Species: †M. gemini

Binomial name
- †Mercuriceratops gemini Ryan et al., 2014

= Mercuriceratops =

Mercuriceratops Temporal range: Late Cretaceous, 77 Ma

Extinct genus of dinosaurs

Mercuriceratops is an extinct genus of herbivorous chasmosaurine ceratopsid dinosaur known from the Late Cretaceous (Campanian stage) of Alberta, Canada and Montana, United States. It contains a single species, Mercuriceratops gemini.

== Discovery ==
In 2007, Triebold Paleontology Inc found frill elements in Fergus County, Montana.

In 2014, the type species Mercuriceratops gemini was named and described by Michael Ryan, David Evans, Philip John Currie and Mark Loewen. The generic name combines the name of the Roman god Mercury, a reference to the similarity of the neck shield to the winged helmet of the messenger of the gods, with ~ceratops, "horn face", a usual suffix in ceratopian names. The specific name is that of the constellation Gemini, named after the twins Castor and Pollux, in reference to the similar specimens the species is based on.

The species is represented only by two squamosal bones collected from approximately time-equivalent sections of the upper Judith River Formation and the lower Dinosaur Park Formation. The holotype, ROM 64222, was found by Triebold, in layer of the Judith River Formation dating from the middle Campanian, about seventy-seven million years old. It consists of a partial right squamosal, possibly of a subadult individual. It was acquired by the Royal Ontario Museum. The second specimen, UALVP 54559, was referred. It too is a partial right squamosal but slightly larger and probably of an older individual. It was found by Susan Owen-Kagen, a preparator at the University of Alberta, at a distance of 380 kilometres from the holotype, in Alberta in the Dinosaur Provincial Park, on the north bank of the Red Deer River, one kilometre east of Happy Jack's Cabin, in a layer of the lower Dinosaur Park Formation, two metres above the Oldman Formation. Associated with UALVP 54559, remains of a brow horn core were discovered but these were not referred because the connection with the squamosal was considered too uncertain.

== Description ==
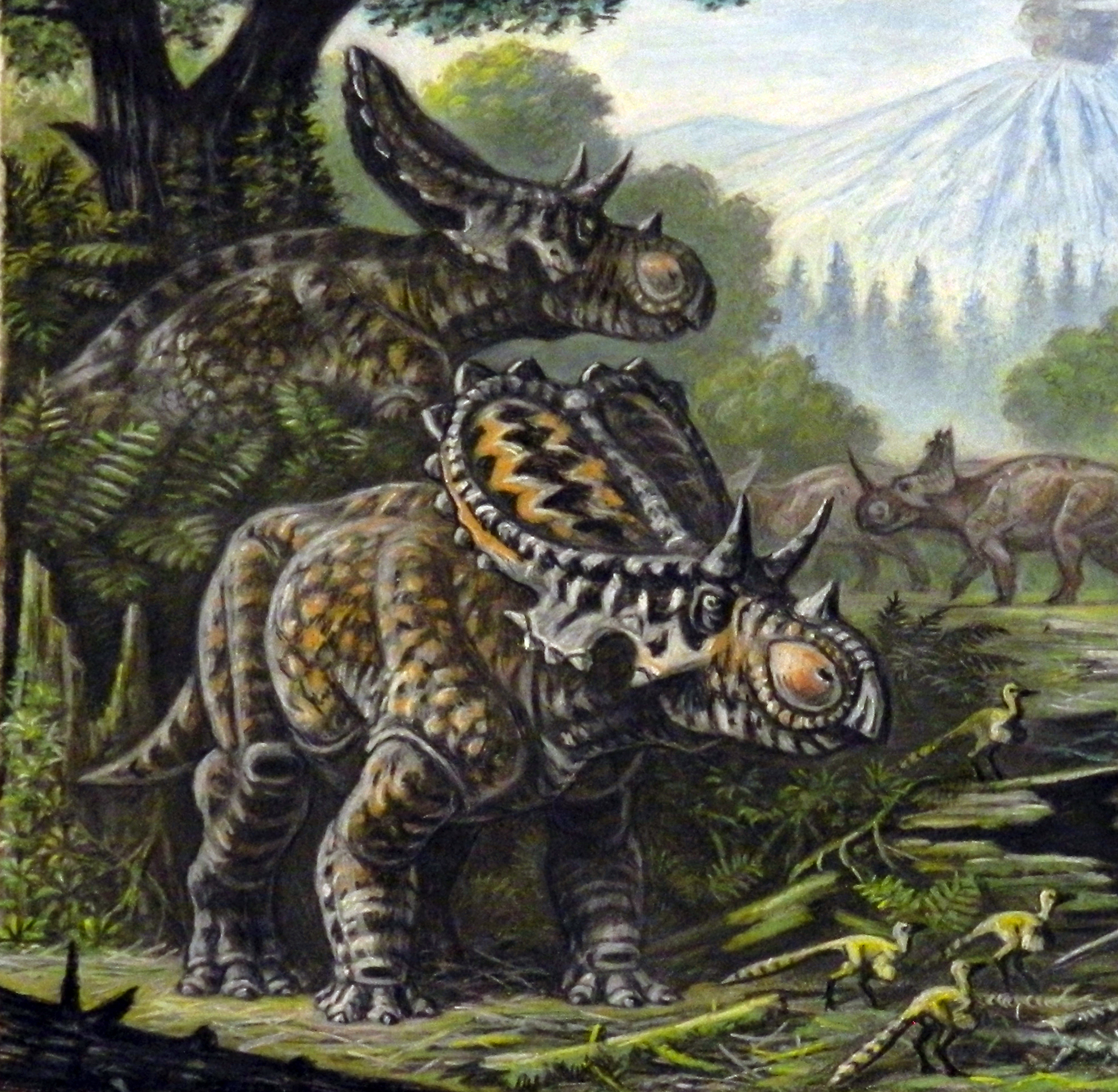
Restoration

Mercuriceratops was a medium-sized ceratopsian, reaching 4 metres (13 ft) in length and 1 metric ton (1.1 short tons) in body mass. The holotype squamosal has a length of 793 millimetres (31.2 in; 2.602 ft).

Ryan et al. (2014) established a single autapomorphy, unique derived trait, of Mercuriceratops. The squamosal possesses a rear branch that is narrowed and rod-shaped instead of being blunt, triangular and tapering, the normal chasmosaurine form, or broadly rounded as with Triceratops. The narrowing is caused by an indentation of the outer rim of the squamosal.

The squamosal carries at least six, and perhaps as many as eight, episquamosals, osteoderms on the frill rim. Based on the narrow form of the squamosal, it was deduced that the inner shield bones, the parietals, were very wide and pierced by enormous parietal fenestrae.

Mercuriceratops was placed in the Chasmosaurinae. It is the oldest chasmosaurine known from Canada, and the first pre-Maastrichtian ceratopsid to have been collected on both sides of the Canada–US border. Though the profile of the Mercuriceratops squamosal suggests it was a transitional form between older rectangular squamosals of centrosaurine shape and later triangular squamosals, the describers rejected this hypothesis because juvenile centrosaurines do not show such a transitional phase during their ontogeny.

== See also ==
- Timeline of ceratopsian research
