= Kennedy Coulee =

Dry gorge in the North American prairies

Coordinates: 48°59′55″N 110°35′30″W

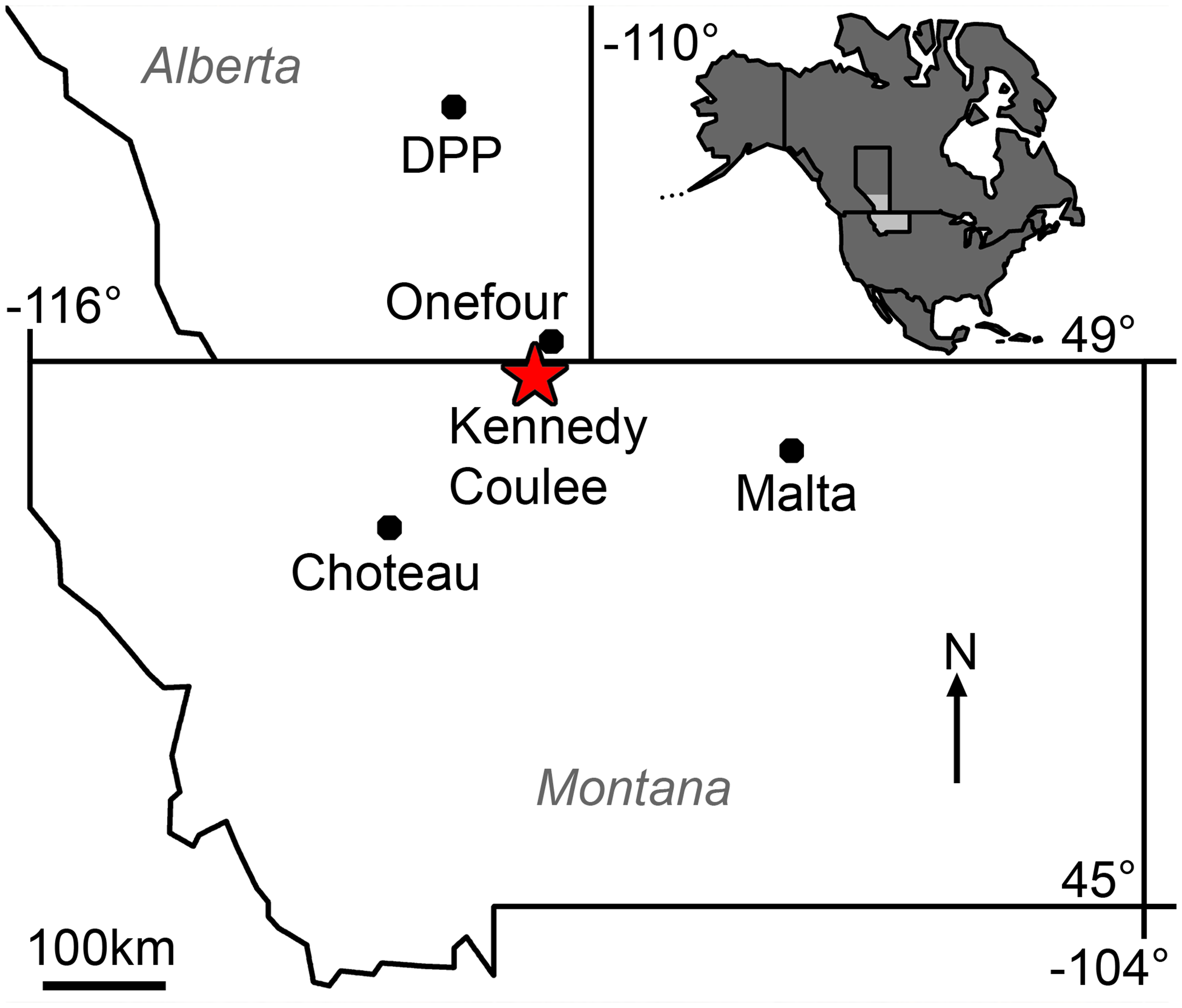
Map of different sites in Montana and Alberta where several dinosaur species of the Brachylophosaurini (Saurolophinae) family have been found. The red star, located on the Kennedy Coulee, spots a Probrachylophosaurus site.

The Kennedy Coulee (or "Kennedy's Coulee") is a coulee – a dry gorge or valley – in northern Montana and southern Alberta. Its exposed rocks of the Judith River Formation are a rich source of fossils.

The Kennedy Coulee begins in the Kennedy Coulee Ecological Reserve, a 1,068-hectare (4.12 sq mi) park in Alberta on the Canada–Montana border, and continues southeastwards for several miles into Hill County, Montana, before turning north and joining the Milk River valley near the US–Canadian border.

The name "Kennedy's Coulee" dates back at least to 1891, when a coal mine was under development there.
