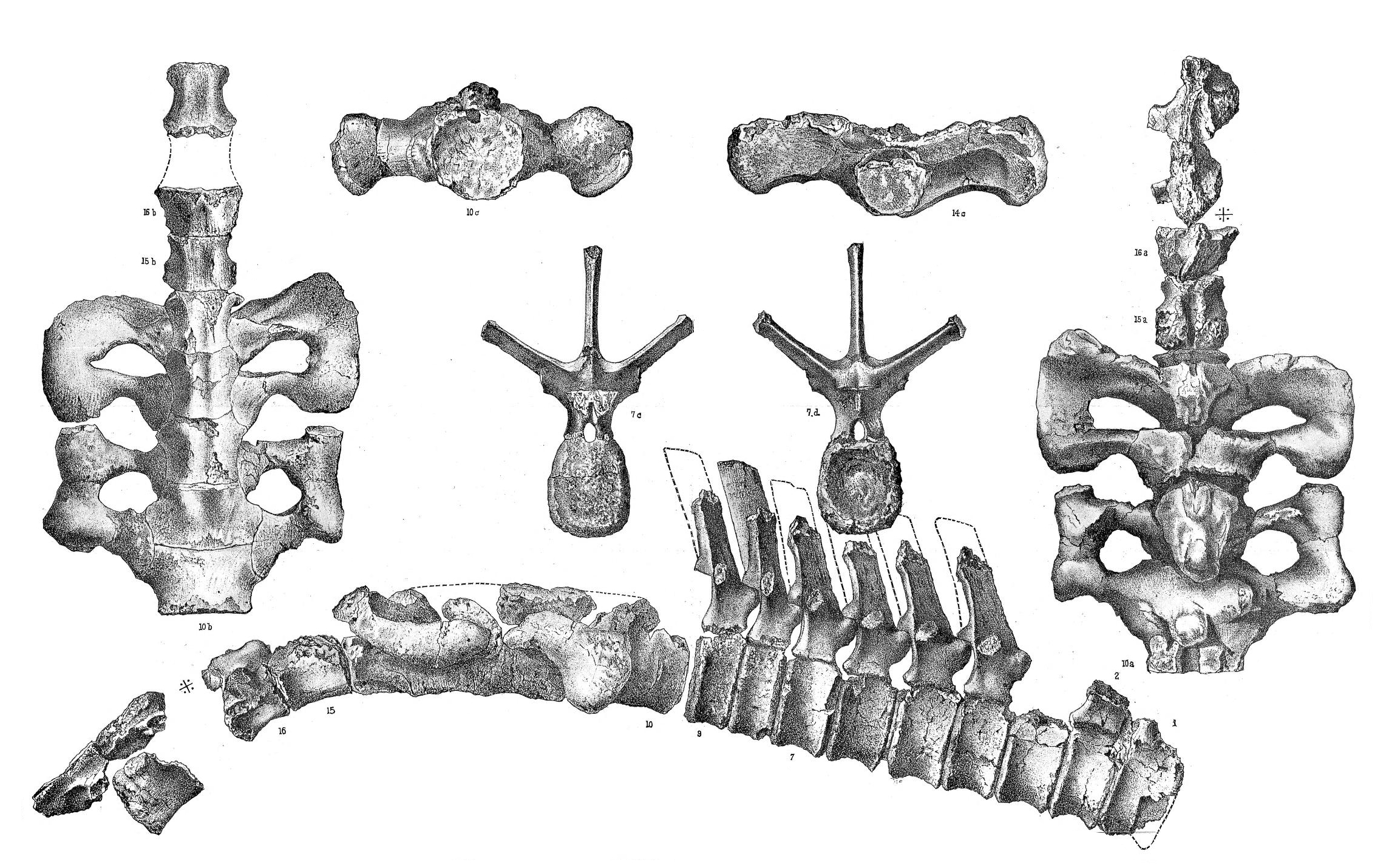
- Illustration of the vertebrae and sacrum

Scientific classification
- Kingdom: Animalia
- Phylum: Chordata
- Class: Reptilia
- Clade: Dinosauria
- Clade: †Ornithischia
- Clade: †Ceratopsia
- Family: †Ceratopsidae
- Subfamily: †Chasmosaurinae
- Tribe: †Triceratopsini
- Genus: †Agathaumas; Cope, 1872

Type species
- †Agathaumas sylvestris Cope, 1872

Species
- See text

= Agathaumas =

Agathaumas Temporal range: Late Cretaceous, 66 Ma

Extinct genus of dinosaurs

Agathaumas (/æɡəˈθɔːməs/; "great wonder") is a dubious genus of a large ceratopsid dinosaur that lived in Wyoming during the Late Cretaceous (late Maastrichtian stage, 66 million years ago). The name comes from Ancient Greek: αγαν - 'much' and θαυμα - 'wonder'. It was seen as the largest land animal known at the time of its discovery.

It was the first ceratopsian known to science from more than teeth, though relatively little is known about it. The original specimen consisted only of the animal's hip bones, hip vertebrae and ribs, and because these bones vary little between ceratopsid species, it is usually considered a nomen dubium. It is provisionally considered a synonym of Triceratops or Torosaurus, but is difficult to compare to both genera because it is only known from postcranial remains.

== History ==
The holotype remains of Agathaumas were first found in 1872 in southwestern Wyoming. They were discovered by Fielding Bradford Meek and Henry Martyn Bannister while they were looking for fossil shells in the Lance Formation near the Black Butte and Bitter Creek. Meek and Bannister were employed by Ferdinand Vandeveer Hayden's Geological Survey of the Territories and notified paleontologist Edward Drinker Cope of the find. Cope himself searched the ridge near Black Butte and re-discovered Meek's site, finding huge bones protruding from the rocks near a coal vein. The bones were preserved in sand and clay sediments, packed with fossil sticks and leaves, indicating a heavily forested habitat. Cope later (in 1873) described the skeleton as "the wreck of one of the princes among giants." Cope and his team eventually recovered complete hip bones, sacral vertebrae, and several ribs from the animal. Later in 1872, Cope published a description and name for the animal, Agathaumas sylvestris, or "marvelous forest-dweller," in reference to its great size and the environment revealed in the same rocks as its bones. The name Agathaumas has been cited as an example of Cope's excitement with this discovery, which he considered, at the time, as the largest known land animal that had ever lived. Several years later, with the discovery of the giant sauropod dinosaurs of the Morrison Formation, it became clear to him that British forms such as Cetiosaurus and Pelorosaurus were land animals.

=== Classification history ===
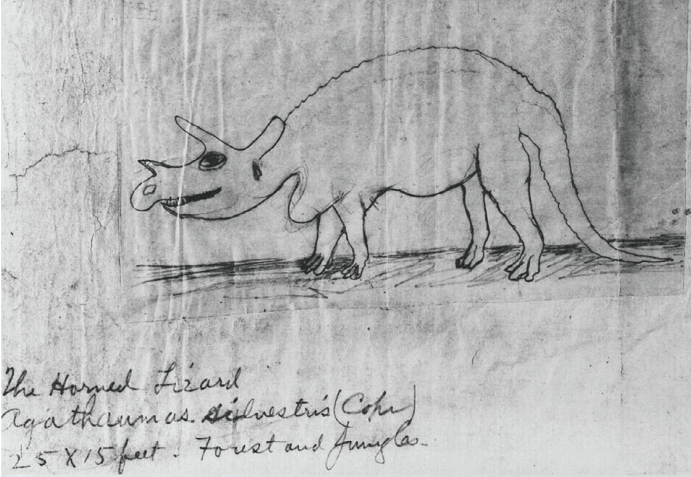
Cope's 1890 sketch of Agathaumas as a ceratopsian based on Triceratops

Cope originally did not know to what group Agathaumas belonged, though he noted that some of the remains were similar to the British reptile Cetiosaurus and very different from the corresponding elements of Hadrosaurus and Dryptosaurus (Laelaps). In 1882, Othniel Charles Marsh, Cope's rival in the Bone Wars, suggested that Agathaumas, along with Cionodon, another Cope taxon, was a Hadrosaurid. In 1883, with his description of the skull of Edmontosaurus (Diclonius), Cope also suggested that his taxa Agathaumas, Monoclonius, and Dysganus could be Hadrosaurids. Cope did not assign Agathaumas into the group now recognized as Ceratopsia until later in 1889, when Cope recognized that his genera Monoclonius and Polyonax were related due to Marsh's description of Triceratops fossils. Marsh had already named a group for the horned dinosaurs, Ceratopsidae, but Cope did not recognize this family name as he believed Ceratops could not be distinguished from other taxa; Cope erected a new name, Agathaumidae. Cope later named 2 more "Agathaumids", Manospondylus gigas and Claorhynchus trihedrus, based on fragmentary fossils in 1892, expanding his group to 5 genera.

After reassessment by John Bell Hatcher, Richard Swann Lull, and Nelda Wright in the 1900s and 1930s, all of the members of Agathaumidae were found to be dubious, and the family name Ceratopsidae was preferred over Agathaumidae. Agathaumas itself was found to be a dubious Ceratopsid by Hatcher and Lull, as well as by John Ostrom and Peter Wellnhofer who placed it as Triceratops sp.

== Species ==
Type:

- Agathaumas sylvestris Cope, 1872; 16 vertebrae from the tail, sacrum and back, a partial pelvis and several ribs

Species previously referred to Agathaumas:

- A. flabellatus (Marsh, 1889) Burkhardt, 1892; alternative combination for Triceratops flabellatus; synonymous with Triceratops horridus.
- A. milo Cope, 1874; included with Thespesius occidentalis by Cope, dubious at Hadrosauridae family level.
- A. monoclonius Breithaupt, 1994; nomen dubium included with Monoclonius sphenocerus
- A. mortuarius (Cope, 1874) Hay, 1901; nomen dubium, alternative combination for Polyonax mortuarius; possible synonym of Triceratops horridus
- A. prorsus (Marsh, 1890) Lydekker, 1893; alternative combination of Triceratops prorsus, unused since
- A. sphenocerus (Cope, 1889) Ballou, 1897; nomen dubium included with Monoclonius sphenocerus

Unfortunately, due to the fragmentary nature of Agathaumas sylvestris’ holotype specimen, Agathaumas is a dubious taxon and cannot be referred beyond Ceratopsidae. based on stratigraphy it is likely a member of Triceratopsini.

== Knight's restoration ==
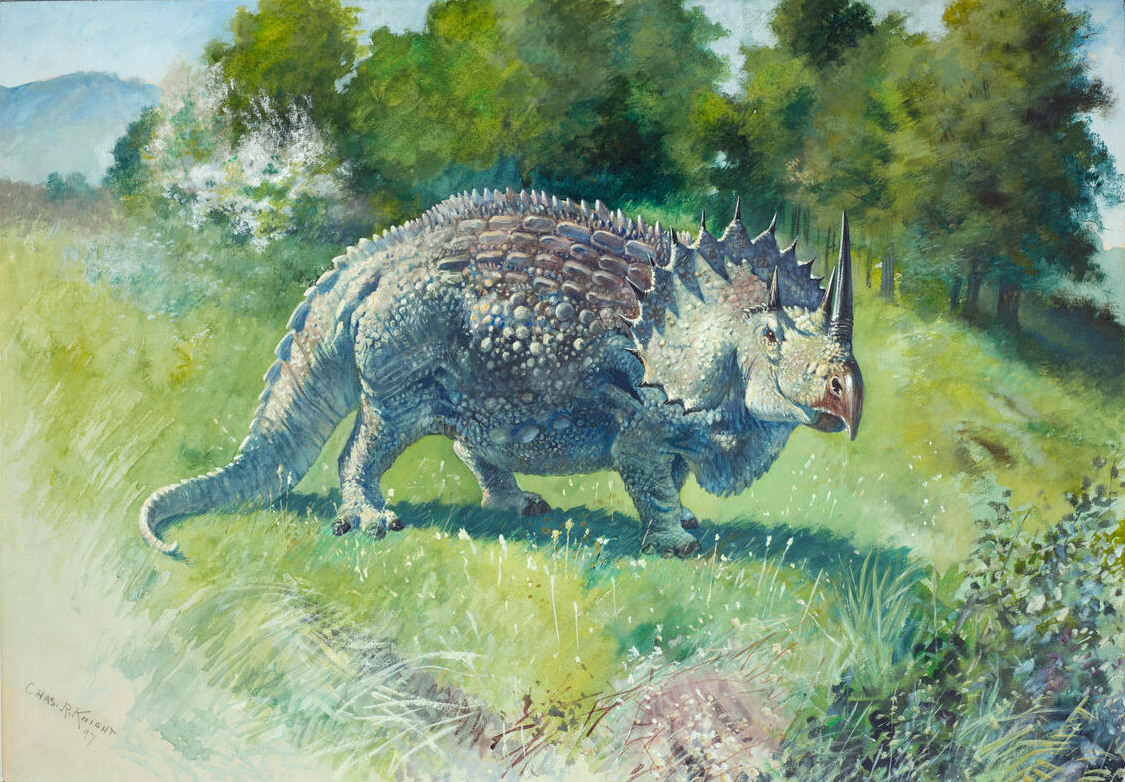
"Agathaumas sphenocerus" by Charles R. Knight, 1897

In 1897, paleoartist Charles R. Knight painted "Agathaumas sphenocerus" for an article in The Century Magazine under the supervision of Edward Drinker Cope. The nasal horn and brow horns were based on "Monoclonius" sphenocerus (possible synonym of Centrosaurus apertus) and "Monoclonius" recurvicornis (unnamed genus similar to Einiosaurus) respectively, which were found in the Judith River Formation in Montana and named by Cope in 1889. The rest of the skull and body were based on an 1891 skeletal reconstruction of Triceratops prorsus by Othniel Charles Marsh. The armor was based on isolated elements from the Lance Formation in Wyoming that Marsh erroneously referred to Triceratops in 1891: the spines on the frill were a Denversaurus schlessmani cervical spine, the scutes on the flank were indeterminate ankylosaurian osteoderms (either Denversaurus or Ankylosaurus magniventris), and the spikes on the back were a Pachycephalosaurus wyomingensis squamosal horn. The name Agathaumas was arbitrarily used for Knight's depiction and no parts were based on A. sylvestris. His painting inspired a stop motion model created by Marcel Delgado that appeared in the 1925 film The Lost World.

== See also ==
- Timeline of ceratopsian research
