= Dysganus =

Dysganus Temporal range: Late Cretaceous, 79–74.9 Ma

Scientific classification
- Kingdom: Animalia
- Phylum: Chordata
- Class: Reptilia
- Clade: Dinosauria
- Clade: †Ornithischia
- Clade: †Ceratopsia
- Clade: †Coronosauria
- Superfamily: †Ceratopsoidea
- Family: †Ceratopsidae
- Genus: †Dysganus; Cope, 1876

Type species
- †Dysganus encaustus Cope, 1876

Other species
- †D. bicarinatus Cope, 1876; †D. peiganus Cope, 1876; †D. haydenianus Cope, 1876

Extinct genus of dinosaurs

Dysganus (dis-GANN-us) (meaning "rough enamel") is a dubious genus of ceratopsian dinosaur from the Campanian stage of the Late Cretaceous. The fossil teeth referred to Dysganus were first collected by Charles Sternberg from the Judith River Formation of Montana and later described by Edward Drinker Cope. All of the species are now seen as dubious ceratopsians, though referred material from tyrannosaurids and hadrosaurids were found in New Mexico.

== Etymology ==
The generic name Dysganus is derived from the Greek roots dys- meaning “bad” and -ganos for tooth enamel, the full name meaning “rough enamel”. The specific name for the type species, D. encaustus, means “burnt in” based on the concave tooth tip. The other species named by Cope have several meanings. D. bicarinatus means “two keels” after the 2 keels running down the length of the type teeth. D. haydenianus was named after American paleontologist and biologist Ferdinand V. Hayden. Lastly, D. peiganus was named after the Peigan Native Americans of Montana, where the type was found.

== History and species ==
Dysganus was first described by American Paleontologist Edward Drinker Cope in 1876 with Dysganus encaustus as the type species based on several fragmentary teeth, believing it was a small herbivorous dinosaur related to Cionodon and Hadrosaurus. Cope also named the species D. haydenianus, D. bicarinatus, and D. peiganus based on solely fragmentary teeth. The fossils had been collected from the Campanian strata of the Judith River Formation east of the Judith River in Montana by Charles Sternberg and company. The type specimens of each species consist of one to eight teeth, all being detached and likely from different individuals. Cope named Dysganus during the Bone Wars, his competition with Yale paleontologist Othniel Charles Marsh, to collect and describe as many fossil taxa as possible. This competition caused the two to publish small papers on finds that hadn't been properly named or analyzed, contributing to taxonomic issues later on. All of the specimens described by Cope were later sold to the American Museum of Natural History in New York after Cope's death where they remain today. Some of the teeth like those of D. peiganus were said by Cope to be more similar to those of Palaeoscincus, while others more akin to Cionodon and Trachodon. Cope also referred teeth collected by David Baldwin from the Upper Cretaceous of the San Juan Basin in northwestern New Mexico, stating they were similar to those of D. encaustus. These likely were the teeth of hadrosaurids and even tyrannosaurids. In 1907, John Bell Hatcher redescribed the teeth of Dysganus, and found that the genus' teeth were composed of those from Hadrosaurs and Ceratopsids making it a chimera and nomen dubium. William Matthew at the AMNH later designated holotype teeth due to their chimeric and composite nature.

Type:

- Dysganus encaustus Cope, 1876; Single maxillary tooth, though originally included 5 additional teeth. Dubious at the Ceratopsia level.

Species previously referred to Dysganus:

- D. bicarinatus Cope, 1876; Single maxillary tooth, originally included seven others from various areas of the skull. Dubious at the Ceratopsia level.
- D. haydenianus Cope, 1876; Single maxillary tooth, originally included two others and bone shards. Dubious at the Ceratopsia level.
- D. peiganus Cope, 1876; Single tooth from the anterior dentary. Hypothesized to be an ankylosaurian, a stegosaurid, or a hypsilophodontid, but it is actually an unworn ceratopsian tooth.

== Classification ==
Cope originally classified Dysganus in Trachodontidae, a family of hadrosauroids now considered a junior synonym of the family Hadrosauridae. In 1901, Franz Nopcsa von Felső-Szilvás assigned Dysganus to the Ceratopsia, either by reading Cope's original descriptions of the genus or by Cope in 1890 indirectly suggesting that Dysganus was a ceratopsian rather than a "trachodontid". Later in 1907, Hatcher et al. republished Cope's original descriptions of Dysganus in their entirety and deduced that the holotype of D. encaustus included teeth of hadrosaurids (then trachodontids), and the teeth of ceratopsids. The teeth of D. peiganus were thought to be from a stegosaurian by Lull and Wright in 1942. However, later analysis by Walter Coombs and Peter Galton demonstrated that all of the teeth were of ceratopsian nature, just from different parts of the mouth and at different stages of erosion.

== Paleoecology ==
All 4 named species are known from the Judith River Formation, the site of expeditions first by Edward Drinker Cope's crews during the early stages of the Bone Wars, including the discoveries of many taxa that he named, though all are now seen as dubious. These include fossils of large, carnivorous tyrannosaurid theropods like Aublysodon and Deinodon and the small dromaeosaurid Zapsalis. Hadrosaurids like Trachodon, Cionodon and Pteropelyx were named. The most common fossils are those of ceratopsians like Monoclonius and Ceratops. Lastly, the ankylosaur Palaeoscincus is known from scattered teeth.
