= 1876 in paleontology =

List of years in paleontology	(table)
- … 1866; 1867; 1868; 1869; 1870; 1871; 1872; 1873; 1874; 1875; 1876; 1877; 1878; 1879; 1880; 1881; 1882; 1883; 1884; 1885; 1886 …
- In science 1873 1874 1875 1876 1877 1878 1879
- Art; Archaeology; Architecture; Literature; Music; Philosophy; Science; +...

Paleontology or palaeontology is the study of prehistoric life forms on Earth through the examination of plant and animal fossils. This includes the study of body fossils, tracks (ichnites), burrows, cast-off parts, fossilised feces (coprolites), palynomorphs and chemical residues. Because humans have encountered fossils for millennia, paleontology has a long history both before and after becoming formalized as a science. This article records significant discoveries and events related to paleontology that occurred or were published in the year 1876.

== Dinosaurs ==
Taxon	Novelty	Status	Author(s)	Age	Unit	Location	Notes	Images
Aublysodon lateralis	Sp. nov.	Nomen dubium	Cope	Campanian	Judith River Formation	Montana	A species of Aublysodon	
Chondrosteosaurus gigas	Gen. et sp. nov.	Nomen dubium	Owen	Barremian	Wessex Formation	England	A sauropod	
Diclonius pentagonus	Gen. et sp. nov.	Nomen dubium	Cope	Campanian	Judith River Formation	Montana	A hadrosaurid	
Diclonius calamarius	Sp. nov.	Nomen dubium	Cope	Campanian	Judith River Formation	Montana	A species of Diclonius	
Diclonius perangulatus	Sp. nov.	Nomen dubium	Cope	Campanian	Judith River Formation	Montana	A species of Diclonius	
Dysganus encaustus	Gen. et sp. nov.	Nomen dubium	Cope	Campanian	Judith River Formation	Montana	A ceratopsid	
Dysganus bicarinatus	Sp. nov.	Nomen dubium	Cope	Campanian	Judith River Formation	Montana	A species of Dysganus	
Dysganus haydenianus	Sp. nov.	Nomen dubium	Cope	Campanian	Judith River Formation	Montana	A species of Dysganus	
Dysganus peiganus	Sp. nov.	Nomen dubium	Cope	Campanian	Judith River Formation	Montana	A species of Dysganus	
Laelaps explanatus	Sp. nov.	Nomen dubium	Cope	Campanian	Judith River Formation	Montana	A species of Laelaps	
Laelaps falculus	Sp. nov.	Nomen dubium	Cope	Campanian	Judith River Formation	Montana	A species of Laelaps	
Laelaps incrassatus	Sp. nov.	Nomen dubium	Cope	Campanian	Judith River Formation	Montana	A species of Laelaps	
Macrurosaurus semnus	Gen. et sp. nov.	Nomen dubium	Seeley	Albian	Cambridge Greensand	England	A sauropod	
Monoclonius crassus	Gen. et sp. nov.	Nomen dubium	Cope	Campanian	Judith River Formation	Montana	A ceratopsid	
Paronychodon lacustris	Gen. et sp. nov.	Nomen dubium	Cope	Campanian	Judith River Formation	Montana	A troodontid	
Zapsalis abradens	Gen. et sp. nov.	Nomen dubium	Cope	Campanian	Judith River Formation	Montana	A dromaeosaurid	

== Anapsids ==
=== Newly named anapsids ===
Name	Status	Authors	Location	Notes	Images
Anthodon		Sir Richard Owen	South Africa; Tanzania	A pareiasaur.	Anthodon
Pareiasaurus		Sir Richard Owen	South Africa; Zambia	A pareiasaur	Pareiasaurus

== Plesiosaurs ==
=== Newly named plesiosaurs ===
Name	Status	Authors	Notes
Plesiosaurus longirostris	Valid	Blake	Now referred to Hauffiosaurus.
Plesiosaurus propinquus	Junior synonym	Blake	A junior synonym of Rhomaleosaurus zetlandicus.
Uronautes	Valid	Cope	

== Pterosaurs ==
=== New taxa ===
Name	Status	Authors	Location	Notes	Images
Nyctosaurus	Valid	Marsh	USA (Kansas)	A Pterosaur with an antenna-like crest .	Nyctosaurus
Pteranodon	Valid	Marsh	USA Kansas; England; Japan	An Crested Pterosaur, Erroneously known as "Pterodactyl"	Pteranodon

== Synapsids ==
=== Non-mammalian ===
Name	Status	Authors	Age	Location	Notes	Images
Cistecephalus	Valid	Owen	255 Millions of years ago.	South Africa	Box-Headed animal	Cistecephalus
Endothiodon	Valid	Owen	257 Millions of years ago.	Brazil; India; Malawi; South Africa; Tanzania; Zambia		Endothiodon
Gorgonops	Valid	Owen	257 Millions of years ago.	Malawi; South Africa	A Gorgonopsian.	Gorgonops
Scaloposaurus	Valid	Owen	251 Millions of years ago.	South Africa		Scaloposaurus
Tapinocephalus	Valid	Owen	261 Millions of years ago.	South Africa	A Dome-headed Dinocephalian.	Tapinocephalus
Theriognathus	Valid	Owen	255 Millions of years ago.	Tanzania		Theriognathus
Titanosuchus	Valid	Owen	261 Millions of years ago.	South Africa	Titanic crocodile.	Titanosuchus
