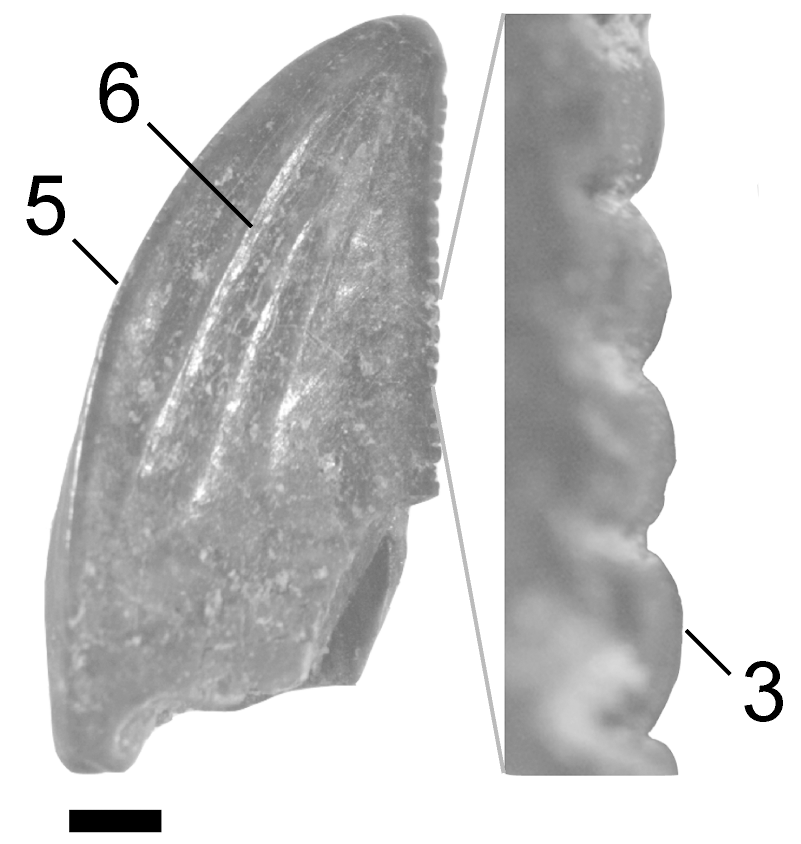
- Tooth of cf. Zapsalis from the Milk River Formation, with close up of denticles

Scientific classification
- Kingdom: Animalia
- Phylum: Chordata
- Class: Reptilia
- Clade: Dinosauria
- Clade: Saurischia
- Clade: Theropoda
- Family: †Dromaeosauridae
- Clade: †Eudromaeosauria
- Subfamily: †Dromaeosaurinae
- Genus: †Zapsalis; Cope, 1876

Type species
- †Zapsalis abradens Cope, 1876

= Zapsalis =

Zapsalis Temporal range: Late Cretaceous, 75 Ma

Extinct genus of dinosaurs

Zapsalis is a genus of dromaeosaurine theropod dinosaurs. It is a tooth taxon, often considered dubious because of the fragmentary nature of the fossils, which include teeth but no other remains.

== Etymology ==
The generic name is derived from Greek za~, "thorough", and psalis, "pair of scissors". The specific name means "abrading" in Latin.

== History and classification ==
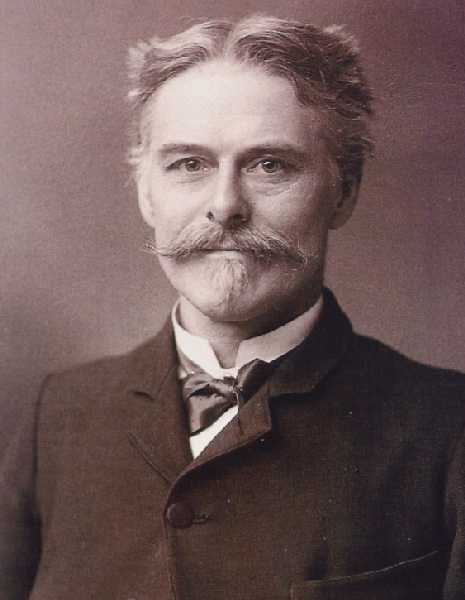
Photo of Edward Drinker Cope, the describer of Zapsalis.

Fossils of Zapsalis were first described by American paleontologist Edward Drinker Cope in 1876 but as species of the large carnivorous theropod Laelaps (now Dryptosaurus). Cope erected 2 species, Laelaps explanatus and L. laevifrons, the former based on a collection of 27 teeth and the latter based on a single tooth. It wasn't until later in 1876 that Cope made the genus Zapsalis, with Z. abradens as the type, based on a second premaxillary tooth. All of the fossils were collected from the Campanian age strata of the Judith River Formation in Montana, USA. Cope named Zapsalis during the Bone Wars, his competition with Yale paleontologist Othniel Charles Marsh, to collect and describe as many fossil taxa as possible.

After the Bone Wars, the type fossils of Zapsalis and the Laelaps species were sold to the American Museum of Natural History in New York. In the wake of the Bone Wars, the complicated errors in dinosaur taxonomy were left to other paleontologists, with the Laelaps species being moved to other theropod dinosaurs like Deinodon, Aublysodon, and Dromaeosaurus. Z. abradens was moved to Dromaeosaurus and synonymized with the other Dromaeosaur Paronychodon. It wasn't until 2002 that Julia Sankey e.a. concluded the teeth represented a separate "?Dromaeosaurus Morphotype A". In 2013 Derek Larson and Philip Currie recognised Zapsalis as a valid taxon from the Judith River and Dinosaur Park Formation. The teeth are typified by a combination of rounded denticles, straight rear edge and vertical grooves. Similar teeth from the older Milk River Formation were referred to a cf. Zapsalis. In 2019, Currie and Evans announced that the Zapsalis teeth from the Dinosaur Park Formation represented the second premaxillary tooth of Saurornitholestes langstoni, in a paper describing a complete skull of that species. The authors kept the species distinct because the type species' holotype is likely indeterminate on a species level.

As for Laelaps explanatus and L. laevifrons, they were never synonymized with Zapsalis but have been synonymized with Saurornitholestes langstoni and in turn, Zapsalis, as well.

== Description ==
The type tooth of Z. abradens is flat lingually, with no mesial serrations and 3 distal serrations per millimeter and is 12 mm in total length. There are three lingual ridges and four labial ones. Currie & Evans, 2019 diagnosed Zapsalis from Saurornitholestes by noting the type of the former is lacking mesial serrations and being concave apicodistally, and therefore "recommended that the two genera be kept separate." The second premaxillary teeth of Zapsalis and other dromaeosaurids may have been structurally specialized for preening feathers, as seen in some Oviraptorosaurs as well.

== Paleoenvironment ==
All four named species are known from the Judith River Formation, the site of expeditions first by Edward Drinker Cope's crews during the early stages of the Bone Wars, including the discoveries of many taxa that he named, though all are now seen as dubious. These include fossils of large, carnivorous tyrannosaurid theropods like Aublysodon and Deinodon. As for the herbivorous Ornithischians, like the beaked hadrosaurids Trachodon and Cionodon were named. The most common fossils are those of the horned Ceratopsians like Monoclonius, Ceratops, and Pteropelyx. Lastly, the armored ankylosaur Palaeoscincus is known from scattered teeth.

== See also ==
- Timeline of dromaeosaurid research
