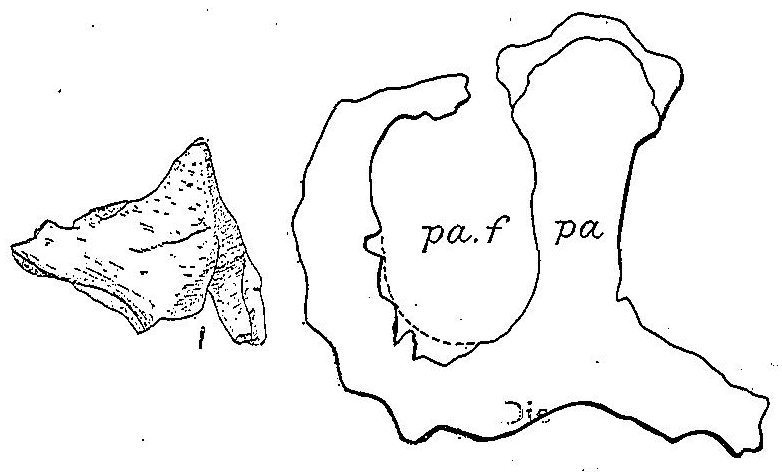
- Nasal horn base and lectotype frill of M. crassus

Scientific classification
- Kingdom: Animalia
- Phylum: Chordata
- Clade: Dinosauria
- Clade: †Ornithischia
- Clade: †Ceratopsia
- Family: †Ceratopsidae
- Subfamily: †Centrosaurinae
- Genus: †Monoclonius; Cope, 1876

Type species
- †Monoclonius crassus Cope, 1876

= Monoclonius =

Monoclonius Temporal range: Late Cretaceous, 77–74.8 Ma

Extinct genus of dinosaurs

Monoclonius (meaning "single sprout") is an extinct dubious genus of herbivorous ceratopsian dinosaur found in the Late Cretaceous layers of the Judith River Formation in Montana, United States, and the uppermost rock layers of the Dinosaur Park Formation in Alberta, Canada dated to between 75 and 74.6 million years ago.

Monoclonius was first named by Edward Drinker Cope in 1876. Later, much taxonomic confusion was caused by the discovery of Centrosaurus, a very similar genus of ceratopsian that is known from much better remains. Today, typical Monoclonius specimens are usually believed to be juvenile Centrosaurus or subadults, in many cases of other genera such as Centrosaurus. Those specimens that remain under the name Monoclonius are mostly too incomplete or immature to be confidently matched with adult specimens from the same time and place. This is especially true of the type species, Monoclonius crassus. Therefore, Monoclonius is often considered a nomen dubium now, pending further study.

== History ==
=== Cope's initial discoveries ===
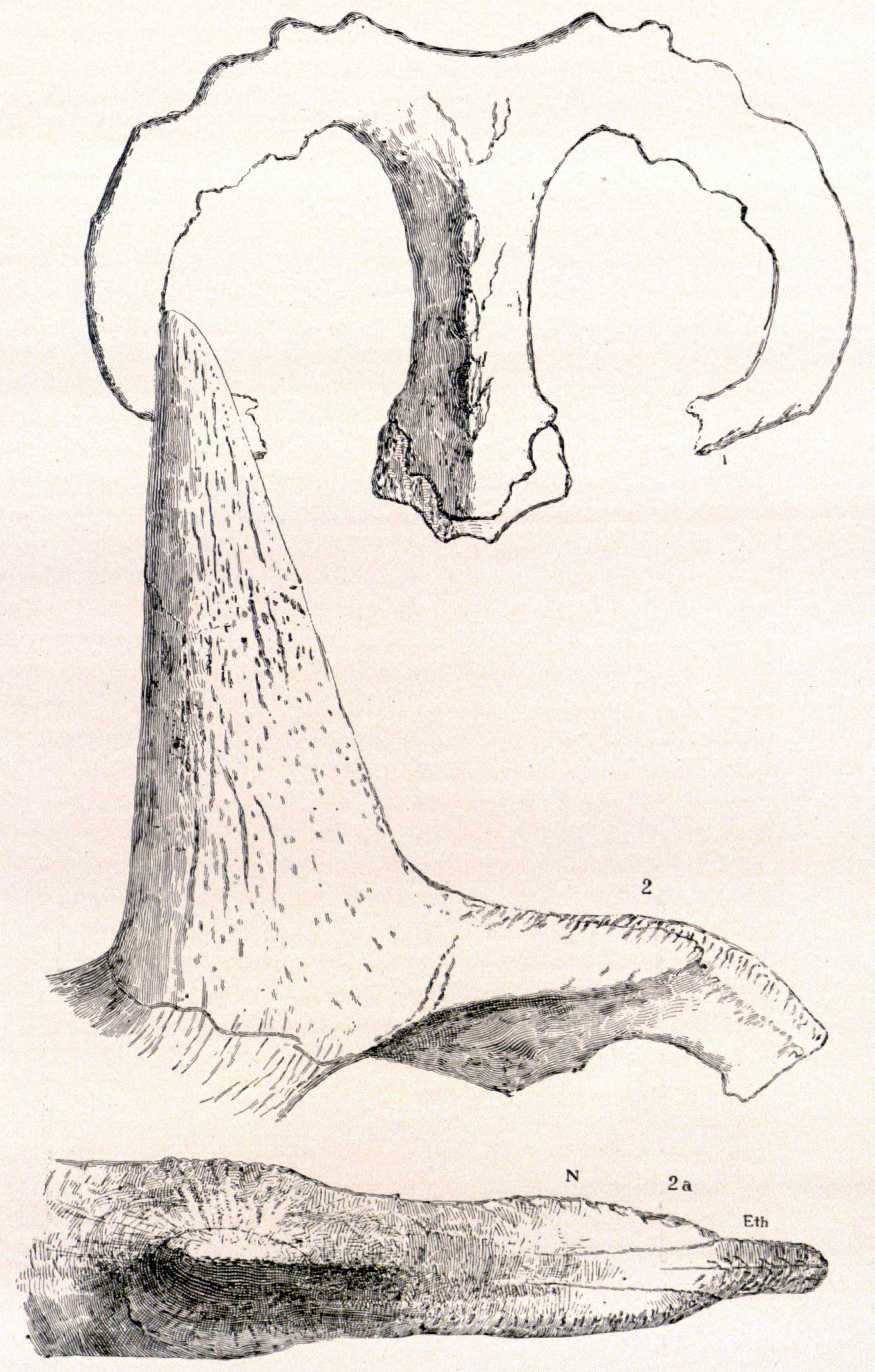
M. crassus and M. sphenocerus holotypes

Monoclonius was Edward Drinker Cope's third named ceratopsian, after Agathaumas and Polyonax. Several fossils were found by Cope, assisted by a young Charles Hazelius Sternberg, in the summer of 1876 near the Judith River in Chouteau County, Montana, only about a hundred miles (some 150 km) from the site of the Battle of the Little Bighorn, fought that June. The finds did not represent a single, let alone articulated, skeleton, but came from different locations. Together they included elements of most parts of the animal (only the feet were entirely missing), including the base part of a long nasal horn, part of the skull frill, brow horns, three fused cervical vertebrae, a sacrum, a shoulder girdle, an ilium, an ischium, two thighbones, a shinbone, a fibula and parts of a forelimb. Just two weeks after leaving Montana, Cope hastily described and named these finds on 30 October 1876 as the type species Monoclonius crassus. The specific name means "the fat one" in Latin. Since the ceratopsians had not been recognised yet as a distinctive group, Cope was uncertain about much of the fossil material, not recognizing the nasal horn core, nor the brow horns, as part of a fossil horn. The skull frill he interpreted as an episternum, an ossified part of the breastbone, and the fused cervicals he assumed to be anterior dorsals.

Contrary to what was stated in most popular or technical science publications prior to 1992, the name Monoclonius does not mean "single horn" or refer to its distinctive single nasal horn. In fact, the genus was named before it was known to have been a horned dinosaur, and had previously been considered a "hadrosaur". The name in fact means "single sprout", from Greek μόνος, monos, "single", and κλωνίον, klonion, "sprout", in reference to the way its teeth grew compared to its relative Diclonius ("double sprout"), which was named by Edward Drinker Cope in the same paper as Monoclonius. In Diclonius, Cope interpreted the fossils to show two series of teeth in use at one time (one mature set and one sprouting replacement set), while in Monoclonius, there appeared to be only one set of teeth in use as a chewing surface at any one time, with replacement teeth growing in only after mature teeth had fallen out. This salient feature of the tooth, which specimen is now lost, almost certainly precludes it from being centrosaurine: it probably indeed is hadrosaurian and was by mistake associated with the rest of the type material.

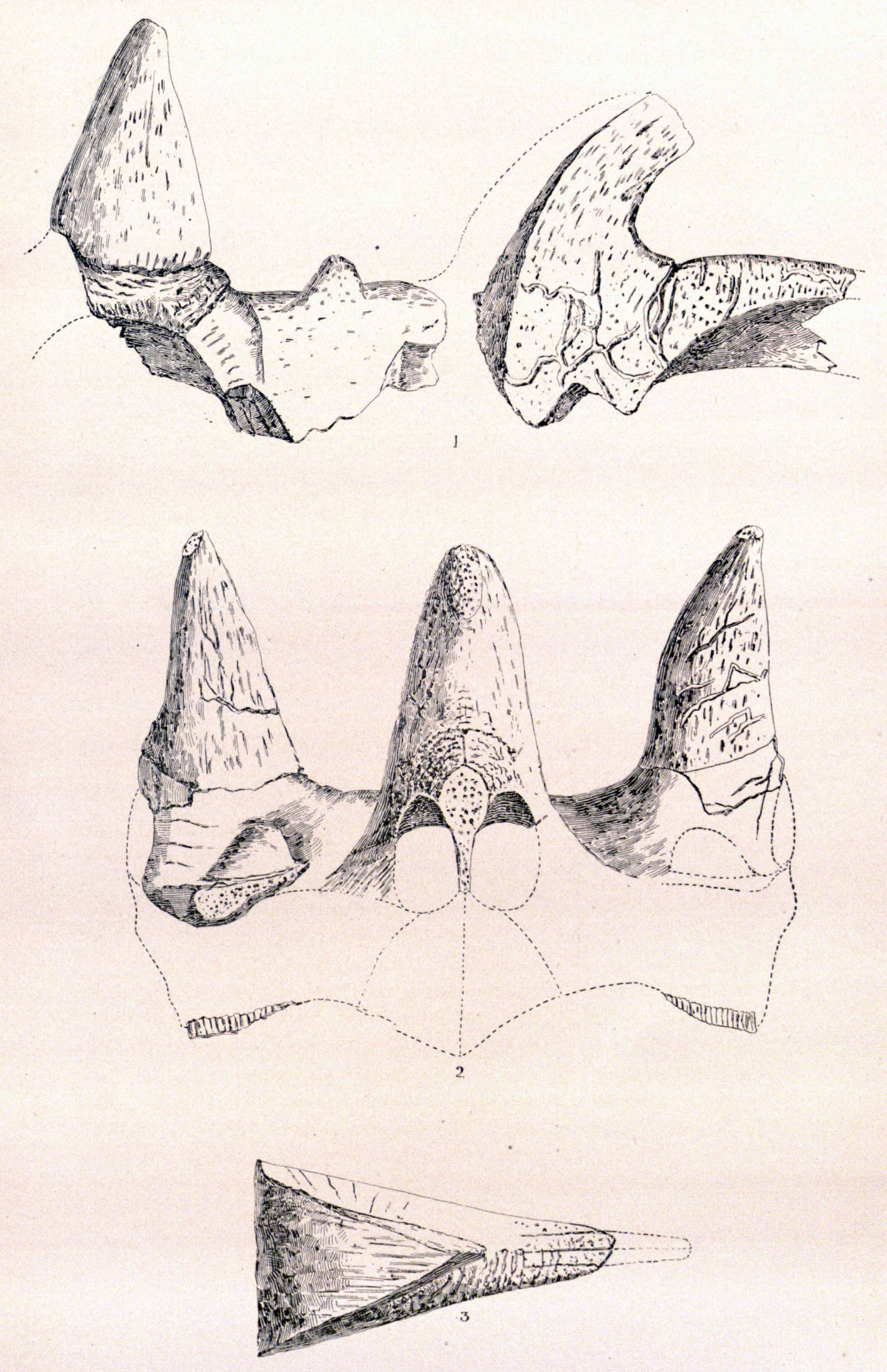
M. recurvicornis holotype

After Othniel Charles Marsh's description of Triceratops in 1889, Cope reexamined his Monoclonius specimen and realized that Triceratops, Monoclonius, and Agathaumas represented a group of similar dinosaurs. In the same year he redescribed Monoclonius as having a large nasal horn and two smaller horns over the eyes and a large frill, of which the parietal bone had been found with broad openings. In the same paper in which Cope examined M. crassus, he also named three more Monoclonius species. The first was Monoclonius recurvicornis, meaning "with a recurved horn", based on specimen AMNH 3999, a short curved nasal horncore and two brow horns, that he had already reported in 1877 but not associated with M. crassus. The second was Monoclonius sphenocerus, the "wedge-horned" from Greek σΦηνός, sphènos, "wedge", based on specimen AMNH 3989, a 325 millimetres (12.8 in; 1.066 ft) long nasal horn, found by Sternberg in 1876 on Cow Island in the Missouri. The third species was Monoclonius fissus, "the split one", based on specimen AMNH 3988, a pterygoid that Cope assumed to be a split squamosal.

In 1895, for financial reasons, Cope was forced to sell a large part of his collection to the American Museum of Natural History. This included his Monoclonius specimens that thus received AMNH inventory numbers. The M. crassus fossils were catalogued as AMNH 3998. Although John Bell Hatcher had been one of Marsh's workers and therefore in the 'Yale Camp' of the Bone Wars, the rivalry between Cope and Marsh, after the death of both he was invited to complete Marsh's monograph on the Ceratopsia also using Cope's material. Hatcher was very critical of Cope's collecting methods. Cope rarely identified specimens in the field with precise locations and often ended up describing composites, rather than single individuals. Hatcher reexamined the presumed type specimen of M. crassus and concluded it in fact represented several individual animals and thus was a series of syntypes. Therefore, he selected one of these as the lectotype, the name-bearing fossil, and chose the distinctive left parietal, forming the dorsal part of the neck frill. The several squamosals, sides of the frill, in the collection could not be associated to this lectotype and he did not believe that Cope's orbital horn (catalogued under a different number) belonged to it. This analysis was eventually, after Hatcher had deceased also, published by Richard Swann Lull in 1907.

=== Centrosaurus is named ===
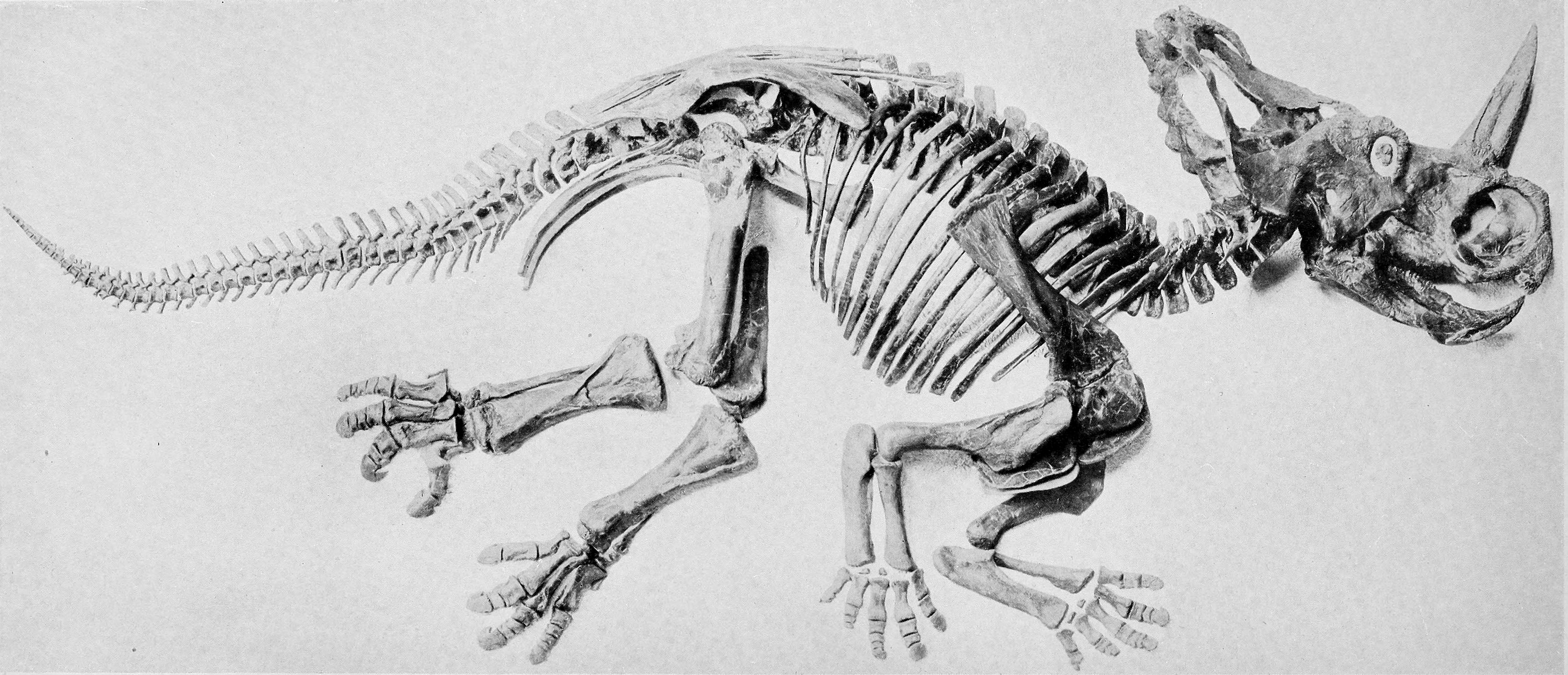
The "Monoclonius nasicornus" skeleton (material now more usually classified in Centrosaurus or Styracosaurus)

In the years after Cope's 1889 paper, it appears that there was a tendency to describe any ceratopsid material from the Judith River beds as Monoclonius. The first dinosaur species described from Canada were ceratopsians, in 1902 by Lawrence Lambe, including three new species of Monoclonius based on fragmentary skulls. Two of these, Monoclonius belli and Monoclonius canadensis, were later seen as two species within separate genera: Chasmosaurus belli and Eoceratops canadensis. The third, Monoclonius dawsoni, of which the epithet honoured George Mercer Dawson, was based on a partial skull, specimen NMC 1173. To this species a parietal was referred, specimen NMC 971. However, in 1904, Lambe decided that this parietal represented a different species and genus that he named Centrosaurus apertus.

With newer specimens collected by Charles H. Sternberg, it became accepted that Centrosaurus was distinctly separate from Monoclonius, at least by Lambe. This was challenged in a 1914 paper by Barnum Brown who reviewed Monoclonius and Centrosaurus, dismissing most of Cope's species, leaving only M. crassus. Comparing the parietals of Monoclonius and Centrosaurus, he concluded that any differences were caused by the fact that the M. crassus lectotype had been that of an old animal and damaged by erosion. This would mean that the two were synonymous, with the name Monoclonius having priority. In the same paper he named another species: Monoclonius flexus, "the curved one", based on specimen AMNH 5239, a skull found in 1912 and featuring a forward curving nasal horn. In 1915, Lambe answered Brown in another paper — the review of the Ceratopsia in which Lambe established three families — transferring M. dawsoni to Brachyceratops and M. sphenocerus to Styracosaurus. This left M. crassus, which he considered non-diagnostic, largely due to its damage and the lack of a nasal horn. Lambe ended the paper by referring Brown's M. flexus to Centrosaurus apertus, the type species of Centrosaurus. The next round fell in 1917 to Brown in a paper on Albertan centrosaurines, which, for the first time, analyzed a complete ceratopsian skeleton, specimen AMNH 5351 found by him in 1914, which he named Monoclonius nasicornus ("with the nose-horn"). In the same paper he described yet another species, Monoclonius cutleri, the epithet honouring William Edmund Cutler, based on specimen AMNH 5427, a headless skeleton featuring skin impressions.

The matter bounced back and forth, over the next few years, until R.S. Lull published his "Revision of the Ceratopsia", in 1933. Although, unlike the 1907 monograph, it has relatively few illustrations, it attempted to identify and locate all ceratopsian specimens then known. Lull described another almost complete specimen from Alberta: AMNH 5341, presently exhibited as YPM 2015 at Yale's Peabody Museum in an unusual way: the left half shows the skeleton, but the right side is a reconstruction of the living animal, and referred it to a Monoclonius (Centrosaurus) flexus. Lull had decided that Centrosaurus was a junior synonym of Monoclonius, but distinct enough to deserve subgeneric rank; he therefore also created a Monoclonius (Centrosaurus) apertus. Charles Mortram Sternberg, son of Charles H. Sternberg, in 1938 firmly established the existence of Monoclonius-type forms in Alberta — no further specimens had come from Montana since 1876 — and claimed that differences justified the separation of the two genera. Monoclonius-types were rarer and found in earlier horizons than Centrosaurus-types, seemingly indicating that the one would be ancestral to the other. In 1940 C.M. Sternberg named another species: Monoclonius lowei. The specific name honoured his field assistant Harold D'acre Robinson Lowe from Drumheller who had worked six field seasons, during the 1925-1937 period, with him across southern Alberta, with other work in Manitoba and Saskatchewan. He created yet another combination in 1949, renaming Brachyceratops montanensis into Monoclonius montanensis, a change today no longer accepted. In 1964 Oskar Kuhn renamed Centrosaurus longirostris into Monoclonius longirostris. In 1987 Guy Leahy renamed Styracosaurus albertensis into Monoclonius albertensis; in 1990 Thomas Lehman renamed Avaceratops lammersi into Monoclonius lammersi. Both names have found no acceptance.

== Classification ==
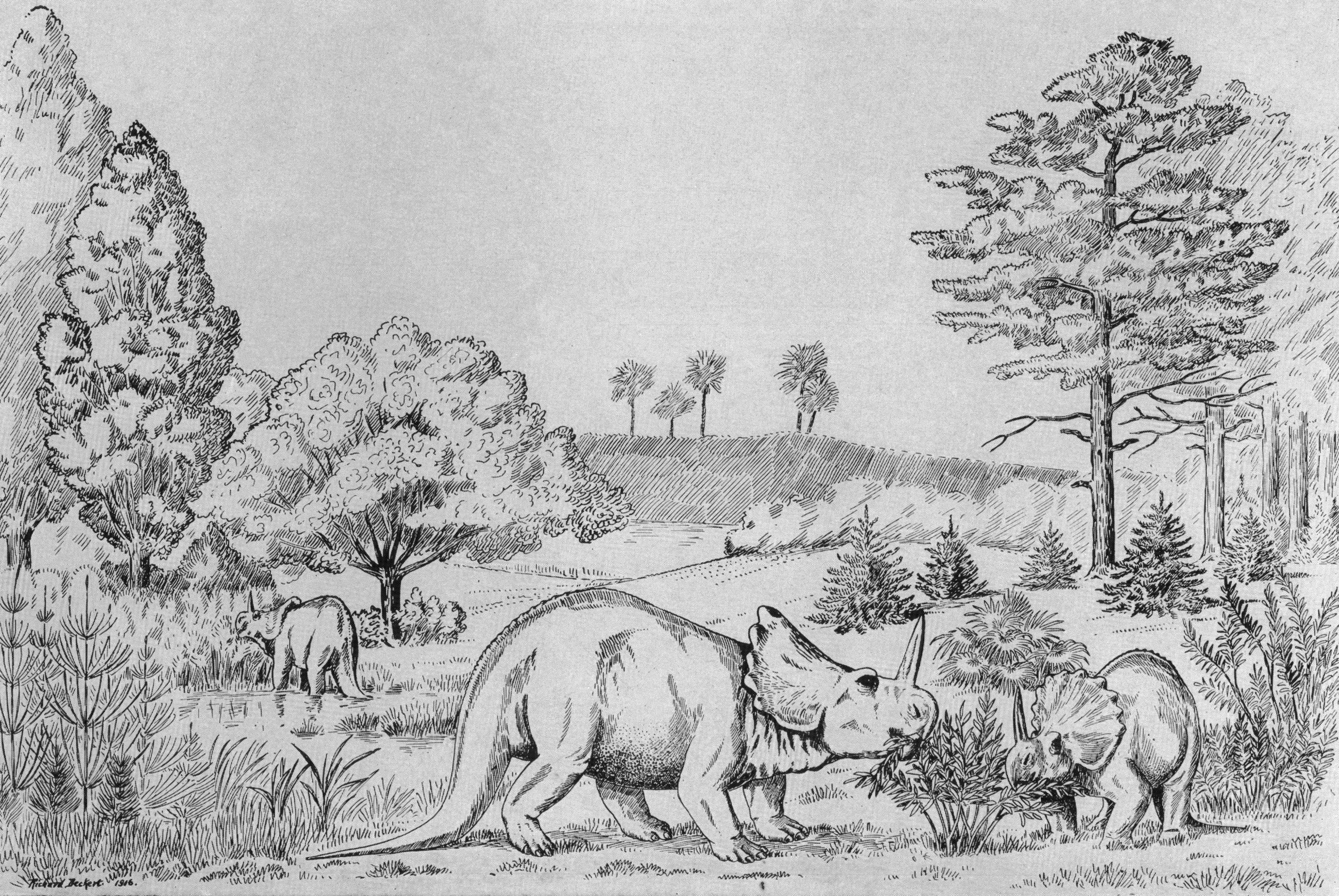
Restoration of M. nasicornis from 1917

During the 1990s, the relation between Monoclonius and Centrosaurus was still contentious. There were three relevant possibilities. The first was that, as Barnum Brown had concluded in 1914, Monoclonius crassus was a valid species and identical to Centrosaurus apertus. In that case Centrosaurus would be a junior synonym and Monoclonius would have priority. The second was that, as Lambe had thought, Monoclonius crassus was a nomen dubium, a species based on fossil material that was so indistinct that no other material could justifiably be associated with it. In that case, the name Monoclonius could be disregarded and Monoclonius species other than M. crassus — if not nomina dubia or nomina nuda themselves — would have to be referred to other genera. The third possibility was that both Monoclonius and Centrosaurus were valid and thus separate.

The last position was from 1990 defended by Peter Dodson who claimed that specimen AMNH 3998, the M. crassus lectotype, differed from the Centrosaurus apertus holotype in having a very thin parietal close to the skull frill edge. That this was not simply a matter of individual variation would be proven by the fact that M. lowei had a comparably thin frill. However, in 1997 Scott Sampson and colleagues concluded that the M. crassus lectotype and all comparable Monoclonius specimens referred to nomina dubia because they all represented juveniles or subadult individuals, as could be seen from their juvenile long-grained bone structure. In some cases the adult form is an already-known species, but in others the adult may not yet be known to science. Most centrosaurine species would thus have a "Monoclonius" phase in their ontogeny, which would explain why such specimens can be found from a wide range in time and space.

In 1998 Dodson and Allison Tumarkin argued that the bone structure could also be explained by species-specific pedomorphosis, the retention by adults of juvenile traits. This would be proven by the fact that the holotype of M. lowei, specimen NMC 8790, possessed an interparietal bone, at 609 millimetres in length the longest of any centrosaurine specimen known. The second longest, specimen NMC 5429 of Centrosaurus apertus, is only 545 millimetres long, showing NMC 8790 was not likely a subadult. However, in 2006 Michael Ryan concluded that the M. lowei holotype was an exceptionally large subadult after all, as shown by a third epiparietal, osteoderm on the frill edge, just beginning to develop, and skull sutures which are not completely closed. Monoclonius crassus was seen as a nomen dubium.

=== Dubious species ===
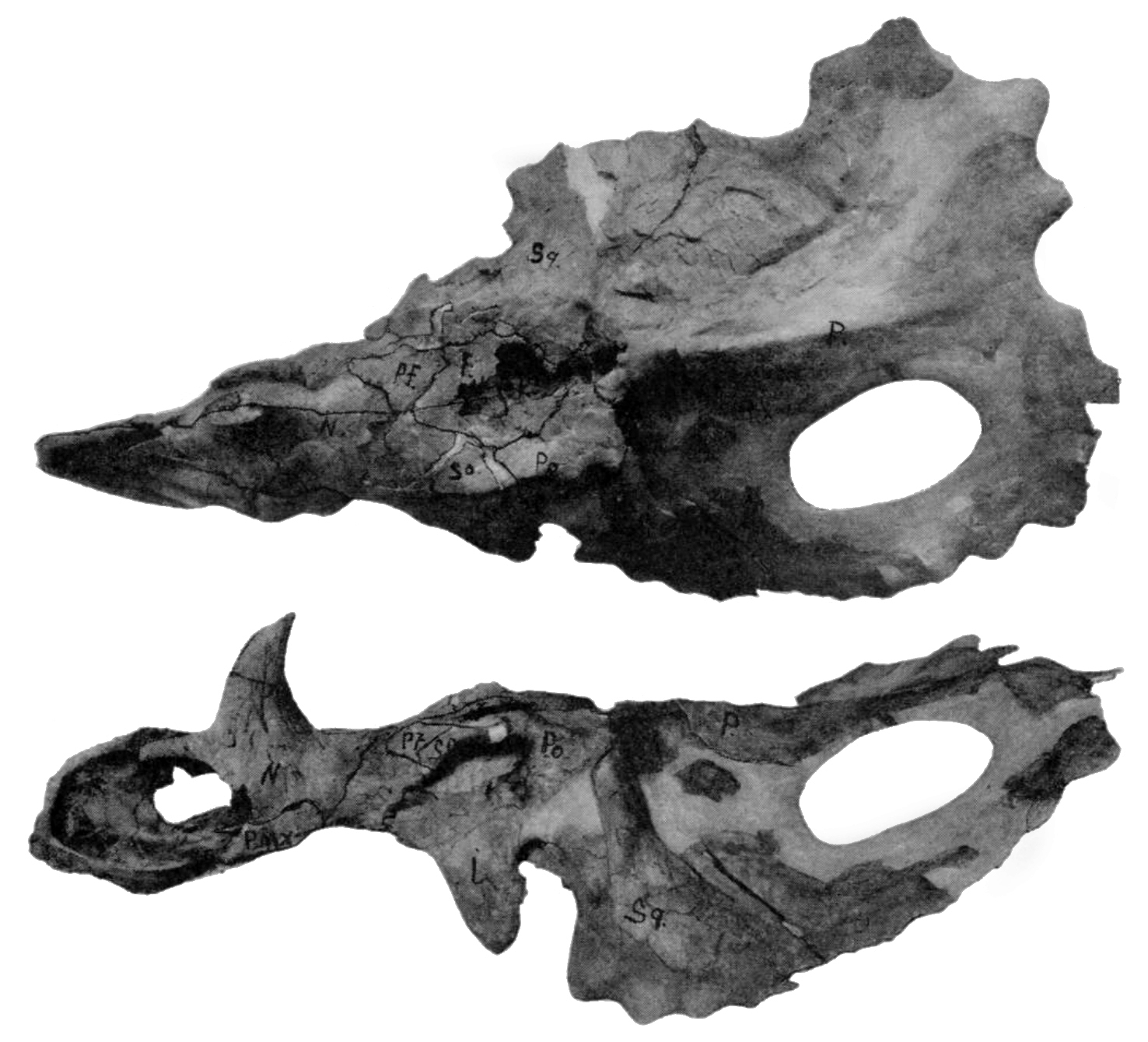
M. lowei holotype

The developing consensus that Monoclonius crassus is a nomen dubium implies that the genus is in principle constrained to this type species, M. crassus, and in fact to the lectotype frill recovered from the Judith River Formation of Montana; even the other material of the AMNH 3998 inventory number cannot justifiably be referred to it. Most of the other historical Monoclonius species have been referred to other genera or are generally seen as nomina dubia or nomina nuda.

- M. crassus Cope, 1876; type species, nomen dubium.
- M. recurvicornis was named by Cope in 1889, based on fossils he had originally discovered and described in 1877. The type specimen (AMNH 3999) consisted of a braincase, two straight orbital horns, a partial forward-curved nasal horn, and other isolated fragments.
- M. sphenocerus was named by Cope in the same 1889 publication as M. recurvicornis. The type specimen consisted of a premaxilla and a distinctive tall, straight nasal horn. It may be a synonym of Styracosaurus.
- M. fissus was also named by Cope in 1889, and based on a bone (AMNH 3988) which he thought was a squamosal that differed from the other species in the size of the attachment areas with the surrounding parts of the skull. The supposed squamosal bone was actually a pterygoid.
- M. lowei was named by Charles M. Sternberg in 1940. The current classification of M. lowei is uncertain. It is based on a large, somewhat flattened skull with a small, backward-curved nasal horn. The type and only specimen, CMN 8790, was recovered from the upper strata of the Dinosaur Park Formation in Alberta. C.M. Sternberg pointed out the resemblance of this specimen to Brachyceratops. M. lowei has previously been considered a synonym of M. crassus, but if the type specimen of that species is not considered diagnostic, M. lowei also cannot be placed in the genus Monoclonius. In 2006, Ryan suggested it might represent a subadult individual of either Styracosaurus, Achelousaurus, or Einiosaurus, based on stratigraphy. The validity of M. lowei is held strong by Peter Dodson, who considers it "almost certainly a diagnosable species" (Dodson 2013).

=== Former species ===
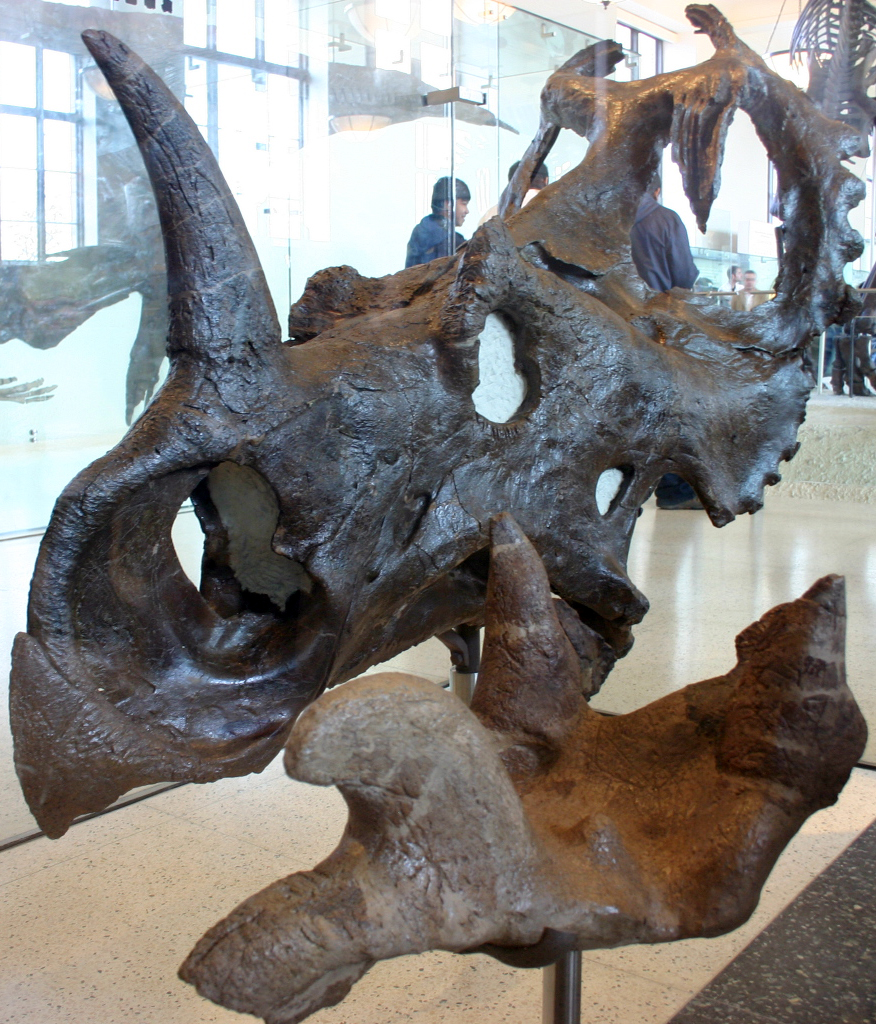
M. flexus holotype skull (now assigned to Centrosaurus apertus) with M. recurvicornis holotype in the foreground, AMNH

Numerous other species have been assigned to the genus Monoclonius in the past, most of which have been either re-classified into other genera or are currently considered synonyms of previously named species.

- M. belli Lambe, 1902; now classified as Chasmosaurus belli
- M. canadensis Lambe, 1902; now classified as Chasmosaurus canadensis or alternatively Eoceratops canadensis
- M. dawsoni Lambe, 1902; synonym of Centrosaurus apertus
- M. flexus Brown, 1914; junior synonym of Centrosaurus apertus
- M. cutleri Brown, 1917; junior synonym of Centrosaurus apertus
- M. nasicornus was named by Barnum Brown in 1917. It was once proposed to be a junior synonym of Centrosaurus apertus or Styracosaurus albertensis (possibly a female morph), or a distinct species sometimes classified as Centrosaurus nasicornus. A 2014 study of changes during growth in Centrosaurus concluded that C. nasicornus is a junior synonym of C. apertus, representing a middle growth stage.
- M. montanensis (Gilmore, 1914) Sternberg, 1949; now classified as Brachyceratops montanensis, which in itself is a possible senior synonym of Rubeosaurus ovatus
- M. longirostris (Sternberg, 1940) Kuhn, 1964; junior synonym of Centrosaurus apertus
- M. apertus (Lambe, 1904) Kuhn, 1964; now classified as Centrosaurus apertus
- M. albertensis (Lambe, 1913) Leahy, 1987; now classified as Styracosaurus albertensis
- M. lammersi (Dodson, 1986) Lehman, 1990; = Avaceratops lammersi Dodson, 1986; = Avaceratops lammersorum (Dodson, 1986) Olshevsky, 1991

== In popular culture ==
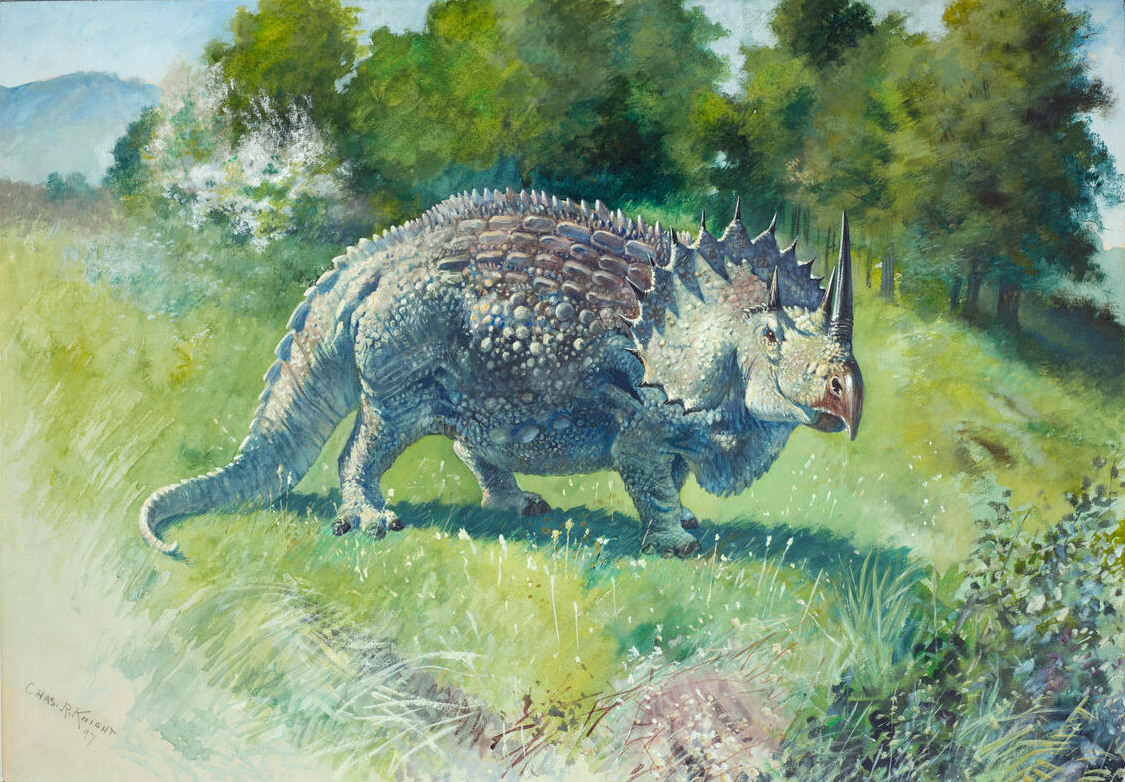
Agathaumas sphenocerus by Charles R. Knight, 1897

In 1897, artist Charles R. Knight painted Agathaumas sphenocerus for Cope. Knight based the painting on the partial skull of the species, which preserved a large nasal horn, and Monoclonius recurvicornis, which preserved small horns over the eyes. A. sphenoceros was originally referred to the genus Monoclonius and later to Styracosaurus, while M. recurvicornis is a possibly a valid species but has yet to receive a new genus. The body was based on a more complete skeleton of the species Triceratops prorsus that had been described and illustrated by O.C. Marsh in 1896. The body armor depicted in the illustration was likely based on the misidentified squamosals of Pachycephalosaurus for the larger spikes, and the smaller armor based on the dermal scutes of Denversaurus collected in Lance, Wyoming by Marsh's crews in the 1890s. At the time, Monoclonius, Agathaumas, and Triceratops were all thought to be close relatives that differed mainly in the arrangement of the horns and the presence of openings in the frill. This painting was later used as basis for a model Agathaumas in the 1925 film The Lost World.

Monoclonius was later reconstructed (based on specimens now classified as Centrosaurus) for Phil Tippett's short film Prehistoric Beast (1984). The following year (1985), the shots used on Prehistoric Beast were used again in the television documentary Dinosaur!, directed by Robert Guenette. On April 6, 2011, the Tippett Studio had published on its YouTube official channel a digital restoration of the Prehistoric Beast short.

Monoclonius appears in the Advanced Dungeons & Dragons Monster Manual and is present in both the 1st and 2nd edition of the games. It appeared in the Dino Riders toyline and accompanying animated series alongside its relative Styracosaurus, reusing the same sculpt except for the head. The Digimon Monochromon is based on Monoclonius.

== See also ==
- Timeline of ceratopsian research
