= Diclonius =

Diclonius Temporal range: Late Cretaceous, 75 Ma

Scientific classification
- Kingdom: Animalia
- Phylum: Chordata
- Class: Reptilia
- Clade: Dinosauria
- Clade: †Ornithischia
- Clade: †Ornithopoda
- Family: †Hadrosauridae
- Genus: †Diclonius; Cope, 1876

Type species
- †Diclonius pentagonus Cope, 1876

Other species
- †Diclonius calamarius Cope, 1876; †Diclonius perangulatus Cope, 1876

Synonyms
- Trachodon pentagonus (Cope, 1876)

Extinct genus of dinosaurs

Diclonius (meaning "double sprout") is a genus of dinosaur from the Late Cretaceous. It was a hadrosaur based solely on teeth. Its fossils were found in the Judith River Formation of Montana, northern US. The name is in reference to the method of tooth replacement, in which newly erupting replacement teeth could be in functional use at the same time as older, more worn teeth.

The type species, Diclonius pentagonus, was named by Edward Drinker Cope in 1876, based on a single tooth specimen (AMNH 3972). Other formally undescribed species include D. calamarius and D. perangulatus. Although Cope referred several other batches of teeth to the genus, under several species, the name is (for some people) considered a nomen dubium.

== History and species ==
In 1876 American paleontologist Edward Drinker Cope described many new fossil vertebrates in his collections from the Fort Union Formation or equivalents of Montana, including seven new species of hadrosaurid. Three of these new species Cope included within the new genus Diclonius: D. pentagonus, D. perangulatus, and D. calamarius. The teeth of Diclonius were characterized by only having one side covered with enamel, and a close relationship with Hadrosaurus and Cionodon was suggested. Diclonius pentagonus, the first species described, was known from teeth and a partial fragment of jaw, while D. perangulatus and D. calamarius were only known from shed teeth. Some teeth Cope assigned to D. perangulatus has previously been considered by American paleontologist Joseph Leidy as teeth of Trachodon, from the Judith River Formation of Fort Union equivalence. Cope named Diclonius for its tooth replacement method found in its dental battery, distinguishing the doubled "sprouting" teeth of Diclonius from the "single sprounting" teeth of Monoclonius he named in the same 1876 study.

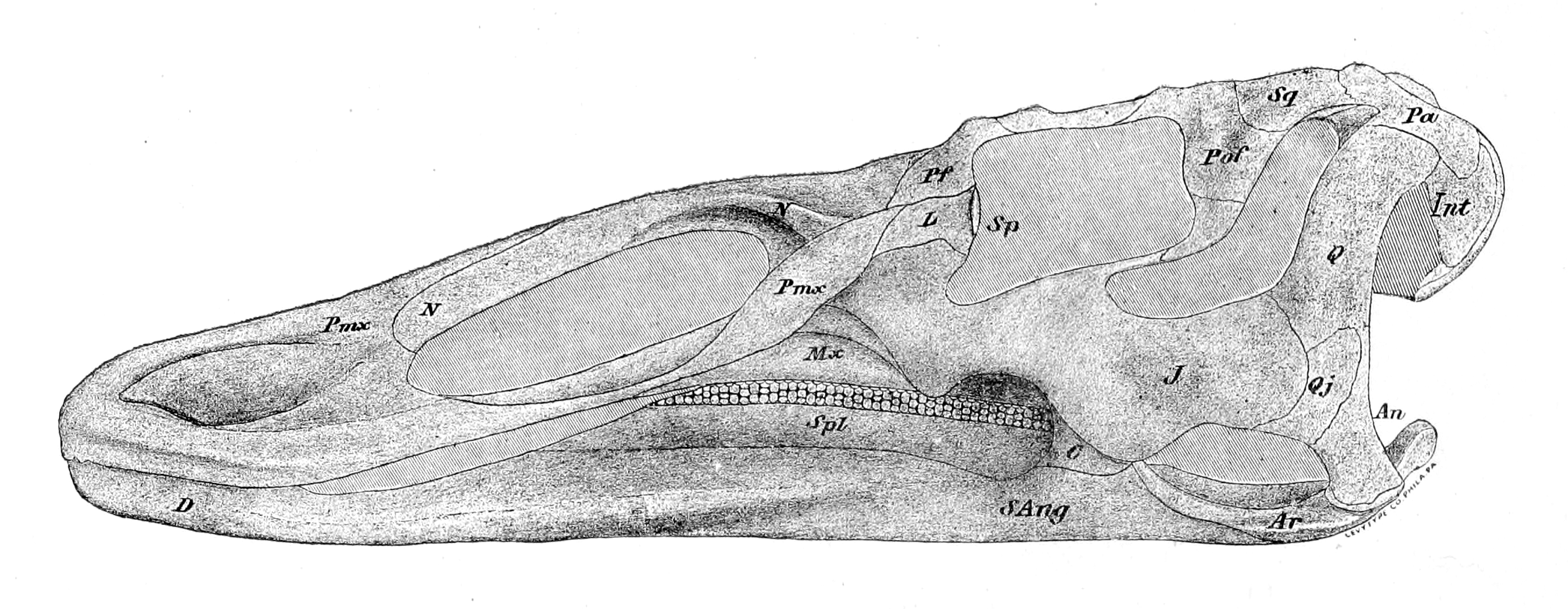
Skull of Anatosaurus copei previously assigned to Diclonius mirabilis

Cope revised the status of Diclonius in 1883 with the referral of the species Trachodon mirabilis, named by Leidy in 1868, under the new combination Diclonius mirabilis. Cope believed this was allowed as he claimed Leidy did not properly diagnose Trachodon, which had priority, which otherwise must include T. mirabilis as its type species. To D. mirabilis Cope referred a very complete skull and skeleton from the Laramie Formation of Dakota Territory.

The status of Diclonius as a diagnostic taxon was refuted by American paleontologists Richard Swann Lull and Nelda Wright in 1942, where they emphasised that teeth were not sufficient to separate genera or species. As a result, they considered Diclonius and all its species, as well as Trachodon mirabilis, nomen dubium, and removed the skull and skeleton Cope described in 1883 as the new taxon Anatosaurus copei. Lull and Wright were also unable to locate the type specimens of the species of Diclonius in the American Museum of Natural History and considered them lost. American paleontologist Walter P. Coombs revisited Diclonius again in 1988, agreeing with previous discussions about the utility of teeth as a holotype. He noted that D. pentagonus had been designated the type species of Diclonius by Hays in 1902, and identified that its type material was AMNH 3972, a single tooth. All three species could be identified as coming from the Judith River Formation, possibly around Dog Creek 4 mi (6.4 km) east of Judith River. D. perangulatus is only known from AMNH 5737, a single tooth, and D. calamarius is similarly restricted to AMNH 5733, a single tooth. Dozens of other isolated teeth were also previously considered part of the types of the species, but were removed, along with a vertebra of an amphibian.
