= Polyonax =

Polyonax Temporal range: Late Cretaceous, 66 Ma

Scientific classification
- Kingdom: Animalia
- Phylum: Chordata
- Class: Reptilia
- Clade: Dinosauria
- Clade: †Ornithischia
- Clade: †Ceratopsia
- Family: †Ceratopsidae
- Genus: †Polyonax; Cope, 1874
- Species: †P. mortuarius

Binomial name
- †Polyonax mortuarius Cope, 1874

Synonyms
- Agathaumas mortuarius (Cope, 1874) Hay, 1901; Triceratops mortuarius (Cope, 1874) Kuhn, 1936

Extinct genus of dinosaurs

Polyonax (meaning "master over many") is a genus of ceratopsid dinosaur from the Late Cretaceous (late Maastrichtian) Denver Formation of Colorado, United States. Founded upon poor remains, it is today regarded as a dubious name.

== History ==
During an 1873 trip through the western US, paleontologist and naturalist Edward Drinker Cope collected some fragmentary dinosaurian material which he soon named as a new genus. Catalogued today as AMNH FR 3950, the type material included three dorsal vertebrae, limb bone material, and what are now known to be horn cores, from a subadult individual. Although it was briefly mixed up with hadrosaurs, and even considered to be a possible synonym of Trachodon, it was recognized as a horned dinosaur in time for the first monograph on horned dinosaurs (1907), wherein it was regarded as based on indeterminate material. Today, the name is used as little more than a historical curiosity, as it dates from a time before horned dinosaurs were known to exist. The most recent review listed it as an indeterminate ceratopsid.

It has sometimes been listed as a synonym of Agathaumas, or Triceratops.

== Paleobiology ==
As a ceratopsid, Polyonax would have been a large, quadrupedal herbivore, with brow and nasal horns and a neck frill.

== See also ==
- Timeline of ceratopsian research
