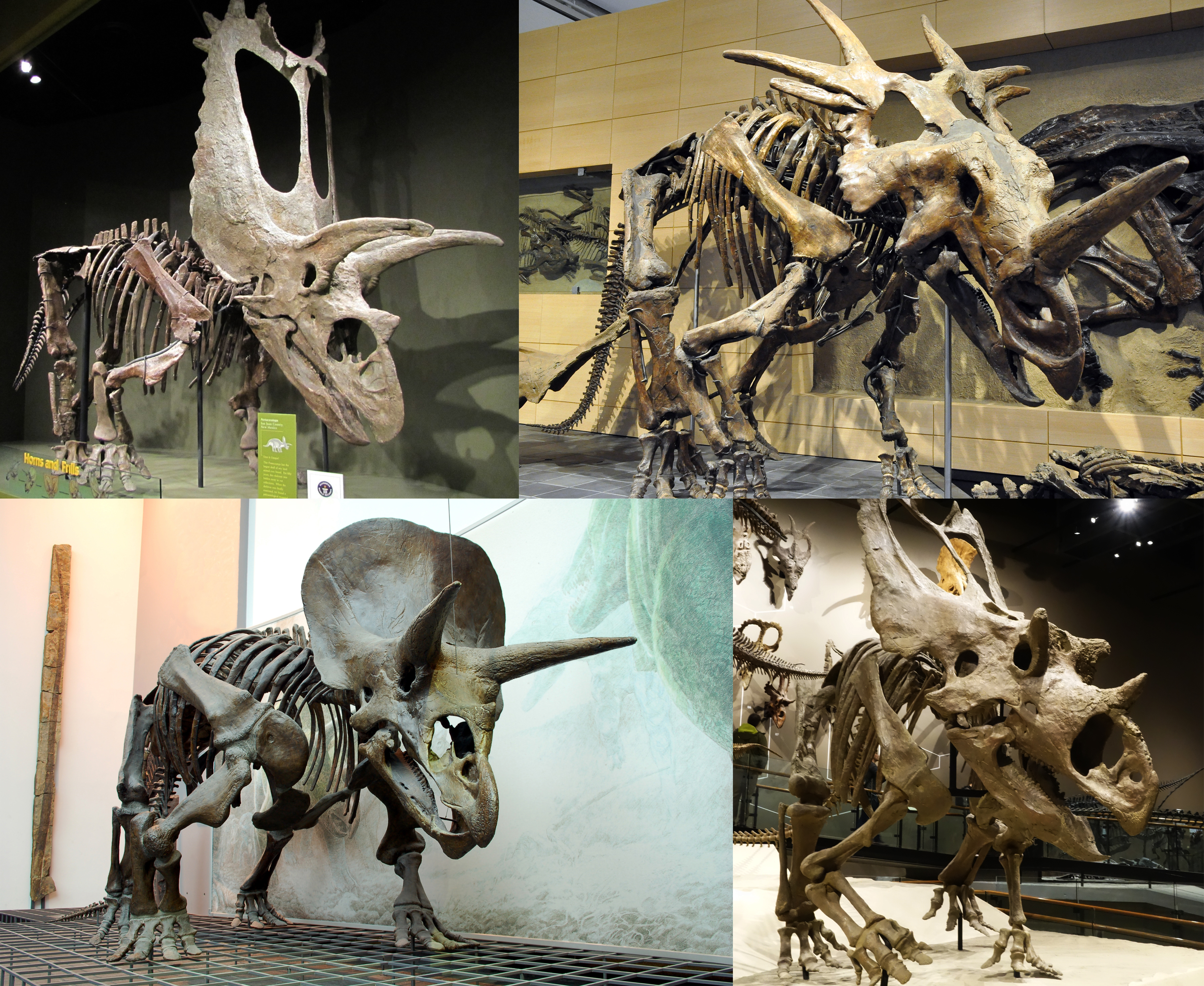
- Montage of four ceratopsids. Clockwise from top left: Titanoceratops, Styracosaurus, Utahceratops and Triceratops

Scientific classification
- Kingdom: Animalia
- Phylum: Chordata
- Class: Reptilia
- Clade: Dinosauria
- Clade: †Ornithischia
- Clade: †Ceratopsia
- Clade: †Coronosauria
- Superfamily: †Ceratopsoidea
- Family: †Ceratopsidae; Marsh, 1888

Subgroups
- †Ceratops; †Dysganus; †Polyonax; †Centrosaurinae; †Chasmosaurinae

Synonyms
- Agathaumidae Cope, 1891; Torosauridae Nopcsa, 1915

= Ceratopsidae =

Ceratopsids Temporal range: Late Cretaceous, ~82–66 Ma

Family of dinosaurs including Triceratops and relatives

Ceratopsidae (sometimes spelled Ceratopidae) is a family of ceratopsian dinosaurs including Triceratops, Centrosaurus, and Styracosaurus. All known species were quadrupedal herbivores from the Upper Cretaceous. All but one species are known from western North America, which formed the island continent of Laramidia during most of the Late Cretaceous. Ceratopsids are characterized by beaks, rows of shearing teeth in the back of the jaw, elaborate nasal horns, and a thin parietal-squamosal shelf that extends back and up into a frill. The group is divided into two subfamilies—Chasmosaurinae and Centrosaurinae. The chasmosaurines are generally characterized by long, triangular frills and well-developed brow horns. The centrosaurines had well-developed nasal horns or nasal bosses, shorter and more rectangular frills, and elaborate spines on the back of the frill.

These horns and frills show remarkable variation and are the principal means by which the various species have been recognized. Their purpose is not entirely clear. Defense against predators is one possible purpose – although the frills are comparatively fragile in many species – but it is more likely that, as in modern ungulates, they were secondary sexual characteristics used in displays or for intraspecific combat. The massive bosses on the skulls of Pachyrhinosaurus and Achelousaurus resemble those formed by the base of the horns in modern musk oxen, suggesting that they butted heads. Centrosaurines have frequently been found in massive bone beds with few other species present, suggesting that the animals lived in large herds.

== Paleobiology ==
=== Behavior ===
Fossil deposits dominated by large numbers of ceratopsids from individual species suggest that these animals were at least somewhat social. However, the exact nature of ceratopsid social behavior has historically been controversial. In 1997, Lehman argued that the aggregations of many individuals preserved in bonebeds originated as local "infestations" and compared them to similar modern occurrences in crocodiles and tortoises. Other authors, such as Scott D. Sampson, interpret these deposits as the remains of large "socially complex" herds.

Modern animals with mating signals as prominent as the horns and frills of ceratopsians tend to form these kinds of large, intricate associations. Sampson found in previous work that the centrosaurine ceratopsids did not achieve fully developed mating signals until nearly fully grown. He finds commonality between the slow growth of mating signals in centrosaurines and the extended adolescence of animals whose social structures are ranked hierarchies founded on age-related differences. In these sorts of groups young males are typically sexually mature for several years before actually beginning to breed, when their mating signals are most fully developed. Females, by contrast do not have such extended adolescence.

Other researchers who support the idea of ceratopsid herding have speculated that these associations were seasonal. This hypothesis portrays ceratopsids as living in small groups near the coasts during the rainy season and inland with the onset of the dry season. Support for the idea that ceratopsids formed herds inland comes from the greater abundance of bonebeds in inland deposits than coastal ones. The migration of ceratopsids away from the coasts may have represented a move to their nesting grounds. Many African herding animals engage in this kind of seasonal herding today. Herds would also have afforded some level of protection from the chief predators of ceratopsids, tyrannosaurids.

=== Diet ===
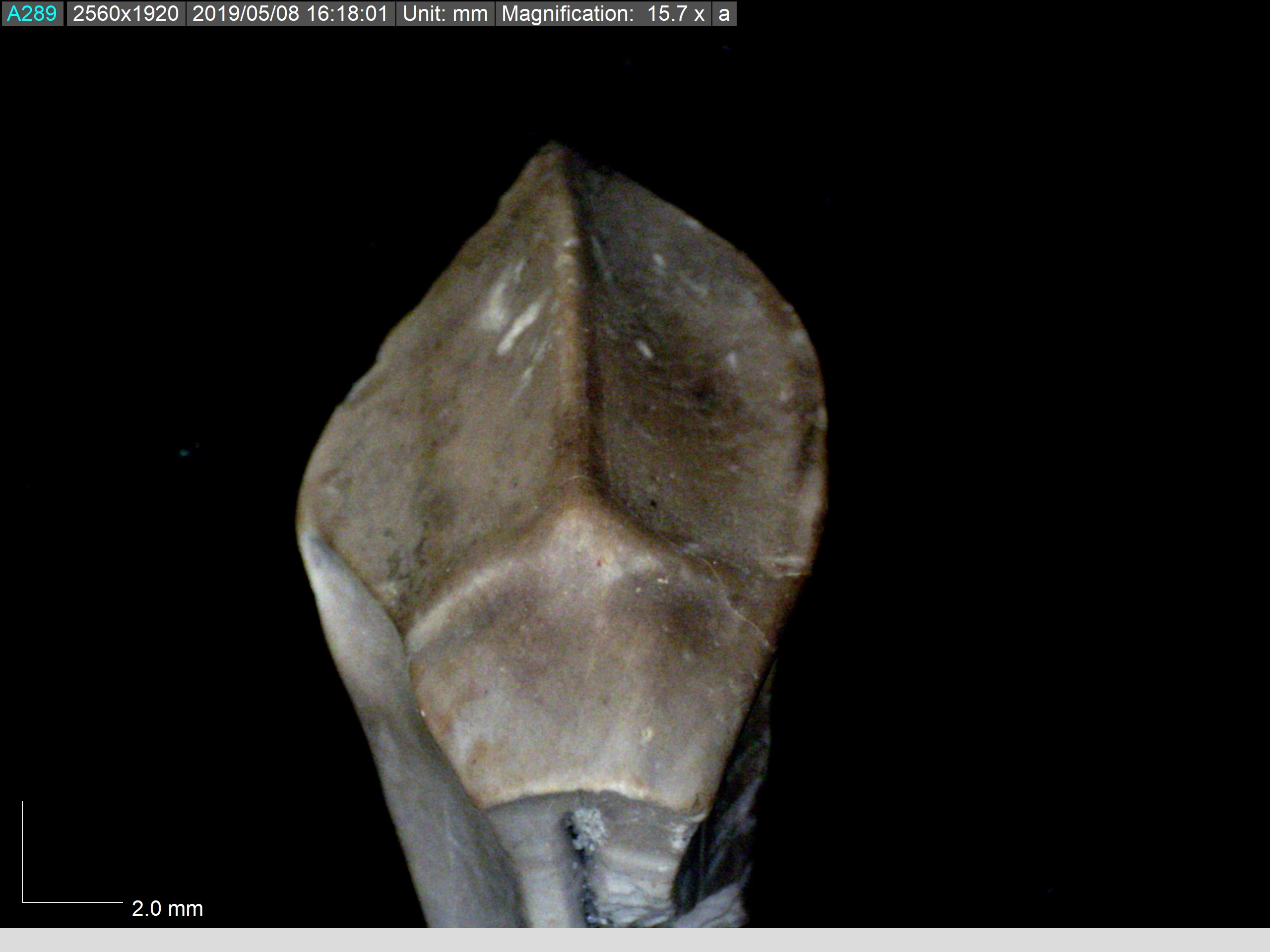
Ceratopsid teeth have a distinctive leaf shape with a primary ridge running down the middle.

Ceratopsids were adapted to processing high-fiber plant material with their highly derived dental batteries and advanced dentition; their skull morphology is consistent with specialisation for feeding on mechanically challenging, low-growing plants. They may have utilized fermentation to break down plant material with a gut microflora. Mallon et al. (2013) examined herbivore coexistence on the island continent of Laramidia, during the Late Cretaceous. It was concluded that ceratopsids were generally restricted to feeding on vegetation at, or below, the height of 1 meter.

=== Physiology ===
Ceratopsians probably had the "low mass-specific metabolic rat[e]" typical of large bodied animals.

=== Sexual dimorphism ===
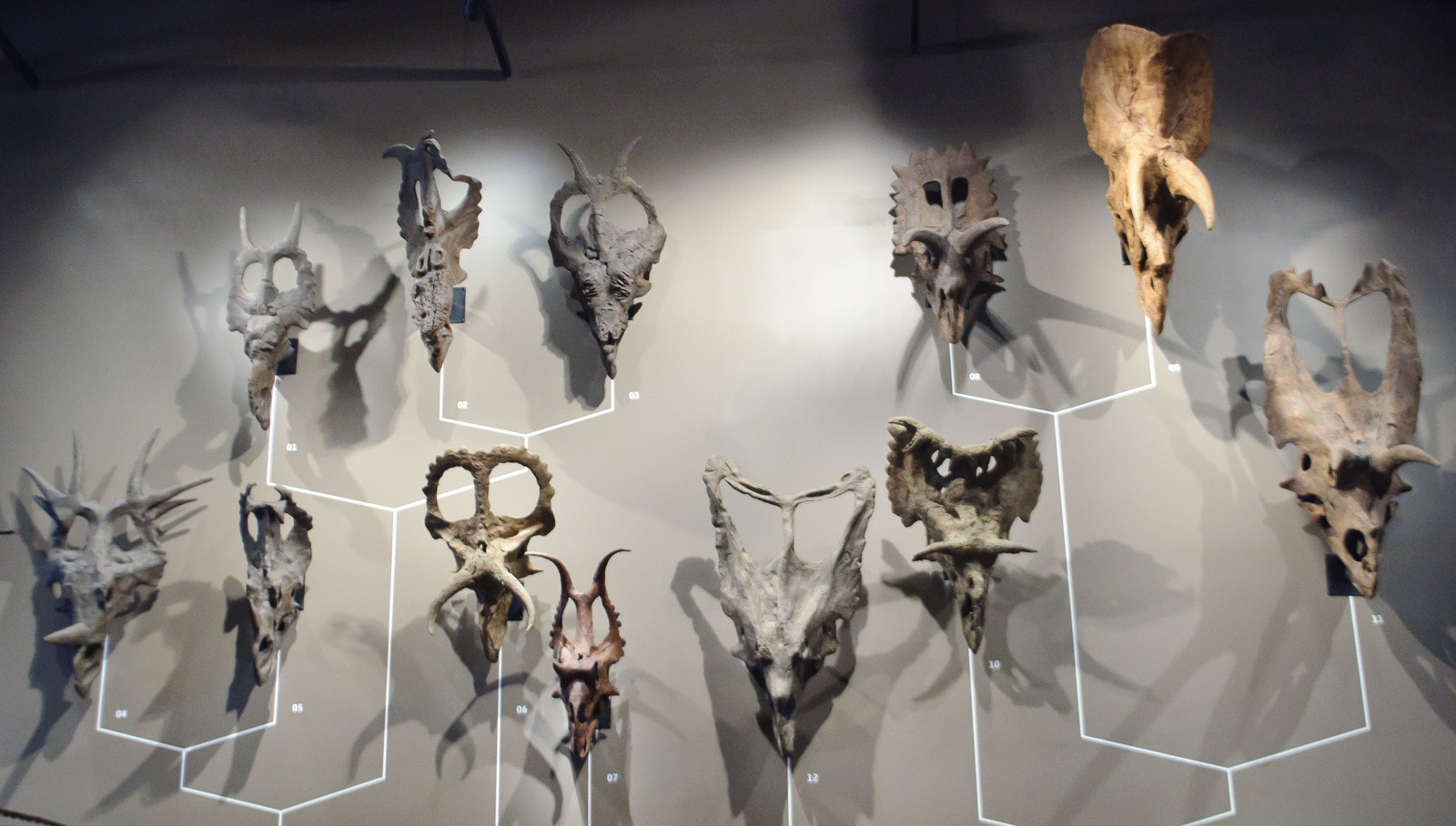
Ceratopsid skulls at the Natural History Museum of Utah

According to Scott D. Sampson, if ceratopsids were to have sexual dimorphism modern ecological analogues suggest it would be in their mating signals like horns and frills. No convincing evidence for sexual dimorphism in body size or mating signals is known in ceratopsids, although it was present in the more primitive ceratopsian Protoceratops andrewsi, whose sexes were distinguishable based on frill and nasal prominence size. This is consistent with other known tetrapod groups where midsized animals tended to exhibit markedly more sexual dimorphism than larger ones. However, if there were sexually dimorphic traits, they may have been soft tissue variations like colorations or dewlaps that would not have been preserved as fossils.

== Evolution ==
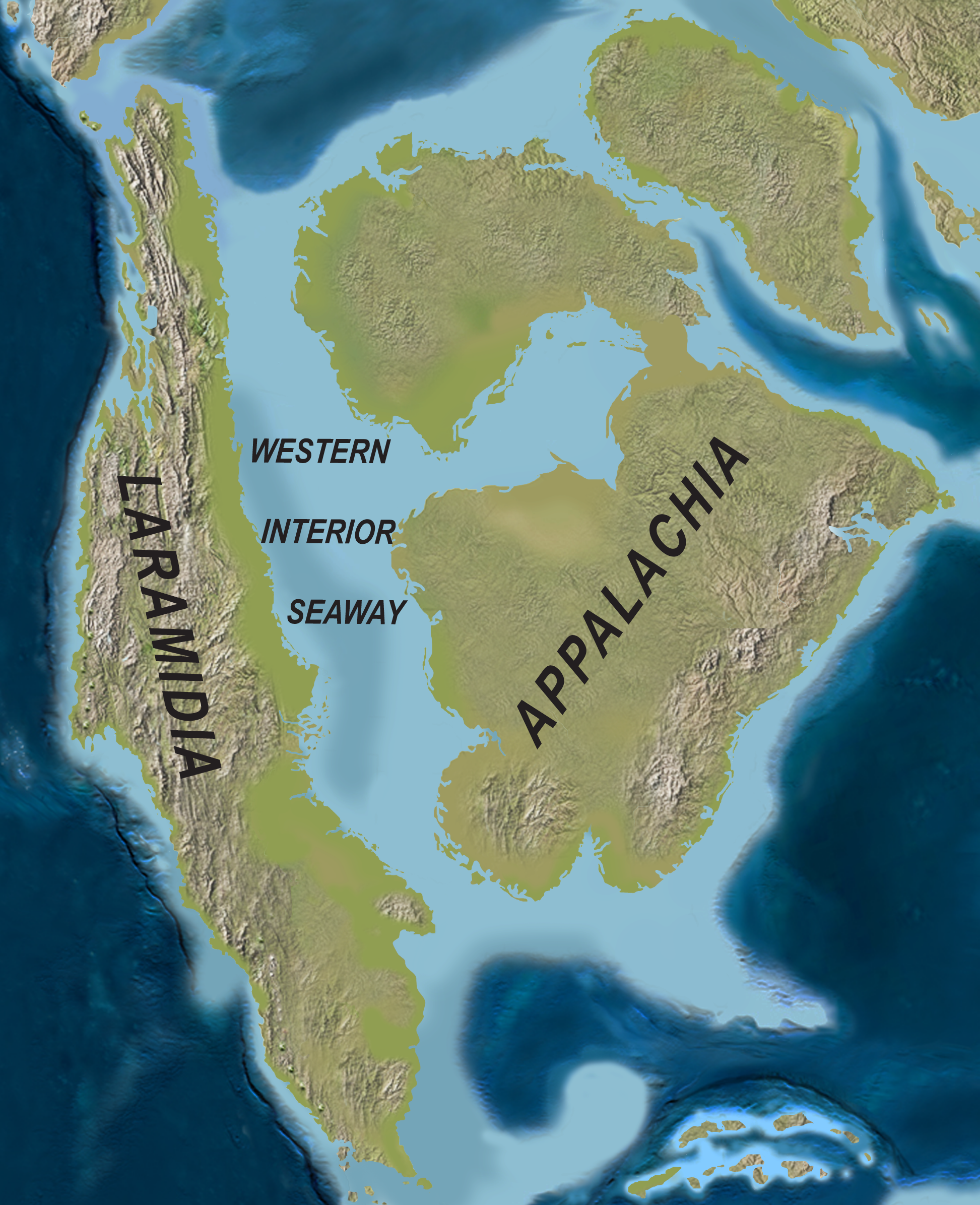
Map of North America during the Late Cretaceous

Scott D. Sampson has compared the evolution of ceratopsids to that of some mammal groups: both were rapid from a geological perspective and precipitated the simultaneous evolution of large body size, derived feeding structures, and "varied hornlike organs." The earliest ceratopsids, including members of both Centrosaurinae and Chasmosaurinae are known from the early Campanian stage, though the fossil record for early ceratopsids is poor. All but one of the named species of ceratopsid is known from Western North America, which formed the island continent of Laramidia during the Late Cretaceous, separated from the island continent of Appalachia to the east by the Western Interior Seaway. The latitudinal range of ceratopsians across Laramidia extends from Alaska to Mexico. The only named ceratopsid outside of Laramidia is Sinoceratops, a centrosaurine from the late Campanian of China. An indeterminate tooth of a ceratopsid is known from Mississippi dating to the late Maastrichtian, a few million years prior to the close of the Cretaceous, indicating that ceratopsids dispersed into eastern North America corresponding to the closure of the Western Interior Seaway at the end of the Cretaceous.

== Paleoecology ==
Size comparison of eight ceratopsids

The chief predators of ceratopsids were tyrannosaurids. δ^{44/42}Ca ratios in tyrannosaurids indicate that ceratopsids were among their most preferred prey.

There is evidence for an aggressive interaction between a Triceratops and a Tyrannosaurus in the form of partially healed tyrannosaur tooth marks on a Triceratops brow horn and squamosal (a bone of the neck frill); the bitten horn is also broken, with new bone growth after the break. It is not known what the exact nature of the interaction was, though: either animal could have been the aggressor. Since the Triceratops wounds healed, it is most likely that the Triceratops survived the encounter and managed to overcome the Tyrannosaurus. Paleontologist Peter Dodson estimates that in a battle against a bull Tyrannosaurus, the Triceratops had the upper hand and would successfully defend itself by inflicting fatal wounds to the Tyrannosaurus using its sharp horns.

The Dueling Dinosaurs specimen from the Hell Creek formation shows a Triceratops buried in combat with a Nanotyrannus.

== Classification ==
The clade Ceratopsidae was in 1998 defined by Paul Sereno as the group including the last common ancestor of Pachyrhinosaurus and Triceratops; and all its descendants. In 2004, Peter Dodson defined it to include Triceratops, Centrosaurus, and all descendants of their most recent common ancestor. Ceratopsidae was given an official definition in the PhyloCode by Daniel Madzia and colleagues in 2021 as "the smallest clade containing Centrosaurus apertus, Ceratops montanus, Chasmosaurus belli, and Triceratops horridus". This definition ensures that the type species of Ceratopsidae, Ceratops montanus, is included in the clade's definition.

== See also ==
- Timeline of ceratopsian research
