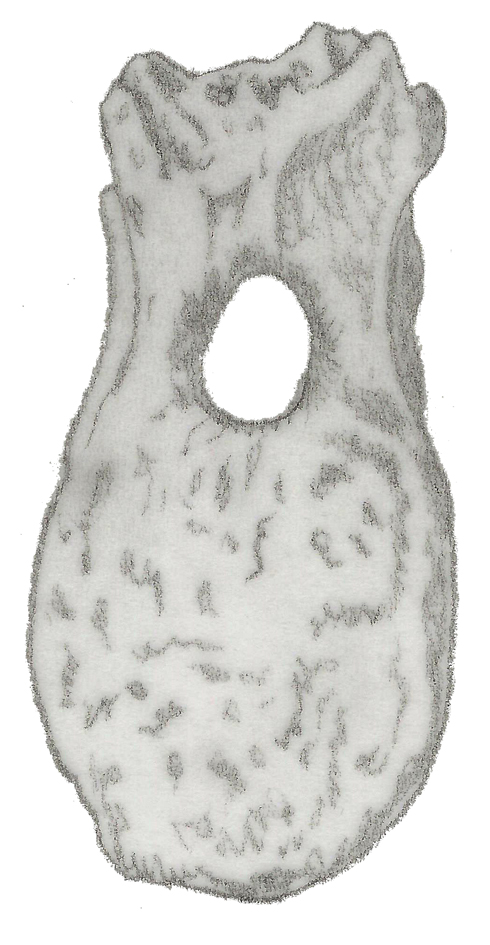
- Illustration of a vertebra of C. arctatus

Scientific classification
- Kingdom: Animalia
- Phylum: Chordata
- Class: Reptilia
- Clade: Dinosauria
- Clade: †Ornithischia
- Clade: †Ornithopoda
- Family: †Hadrosauridae
- Genus: †Cionodon; Cope, 1874

Type species
- †Cionodon arctatus Cope, 1874

Species
- †C. arctatus Cope, 1874 (nomen dubium); †C. stenopsis Cope, 1875 (nomen dubium)

Synonyms
- Cinodon Cope, 1874 (sic)

= Cionodon =

Cionodon Temporal range: Late Cretaceous, 70–66 Ma

Extinct genus of dinosaurs

Cionodon (meaning 'column tooth') is a dubious genus of hadrosaurid dinosaur from the Late Cretaceous. The type species, C. arctatus, was found in the Denver Formation of Lodge Pole Creek, Colorado and was formally described by Edward Drinker Cope in 1874 based on the holotype AMNH 3951, collected in 1873. It is a nomen dubium because it is based on very fragmentary remains. Two other species have since been described: Cionodon kysylkumensis (Riabinin, 1931), based on the holotype CCMGE 1/3760 (a set of vertebrae) from Uzbekistan, and Cionodon stenopsis (Cope, 1875), discovered in rocks from the Judith River Formation of Alberta, Canada in 1874. Although both are probably hadrosaurs, they are known only from fragmentary remains and Cionodon kysylkumensis has since been reclassified as Bactrosaurus kysylkumensis.

== History of naming ==
In 1874, American paleontologist Edward Drinker Cope identified that sediments in northern Colorado that had previously been considered Tertiary were actually from the Cretaceous, confirmed by a vertebrate assemblage collected by Ferdinand Hayden. This strata was recognized as equivalent to the Great Lignite exposed along the Missouri River, rather than the Pliocene. Among the vertebrate fossils to support this designation, Cope noted the new dinosaur taxa "Agathaumas milo", "Polyonax mortuarius", and Cinodon arctatus, though he only described the latter. Cinodon was described as an herbivorous hadrosaurid, distinguished primarily by its teeth but also known from other parts of the skeleton. Cope more thoroughly described Cionodon the next year in 1875, noting that a proofreader had incorrectly written the name as Cinodon rather than his indented Cionodon. The material of Cionodon was found across two localities few miles apart, and though vertebrae and limb bones were also referred, Cope identified a partial maxilla with teeth as the holotype of the taxon. The genus name Cionodon comes from a combination of the Ancient Greek κίων (kion) and ὀδών (-odon) meaning "column/pillar tooth", and the specific name is from the Latin arctatus, "compressed". In 1875 Cope also named a second species of Cionodon, C. stenopsis, based on remains including teeth from the Milk River valley in Saskatchewan.
