= Neck frill =

Margin seen on the back of the heads of some reptiles

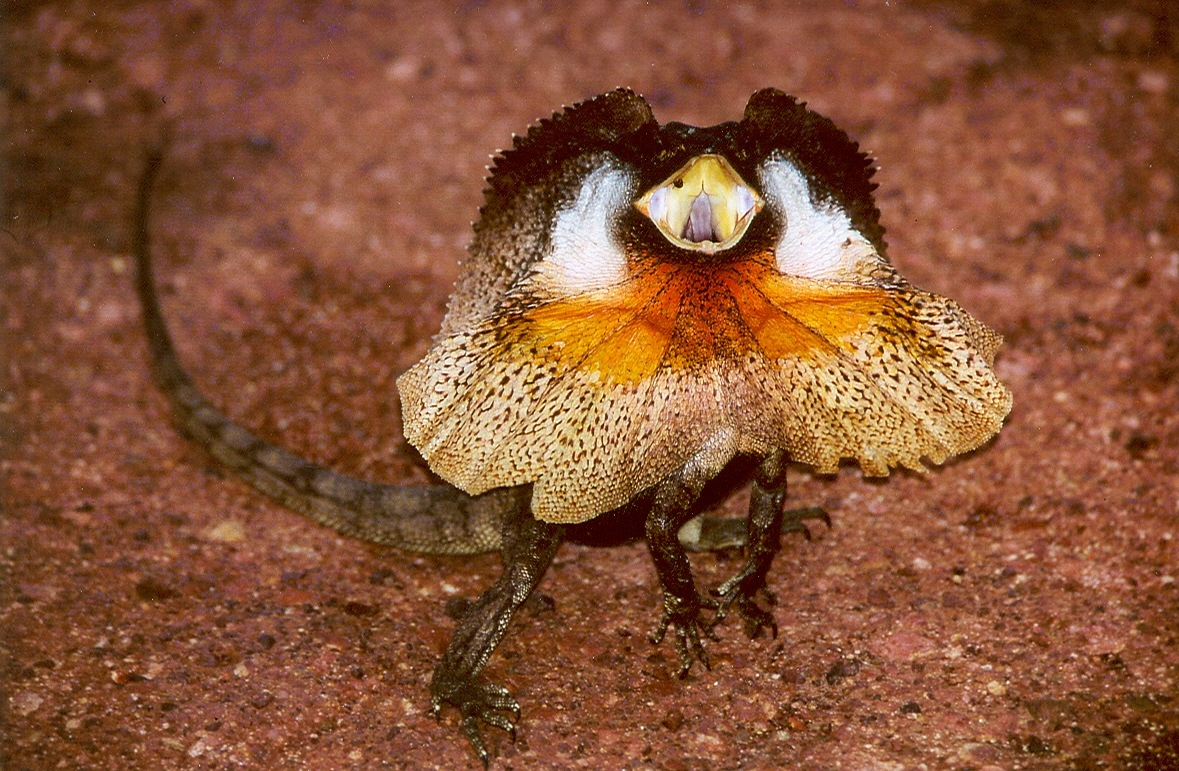
Frill-necked lizard showing its neck frills

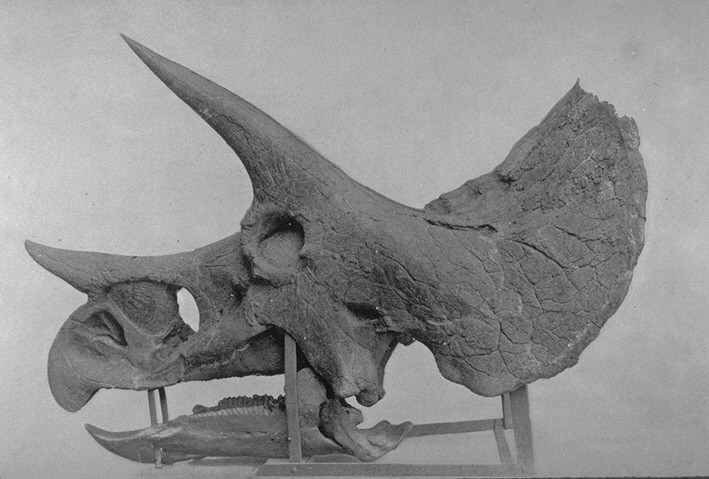
Skull of Triceratops with its large neck frill

A neck frill is the relatively extensive margin seen on the back of the heads of reptiles with either a bony support such as those present on the skulls of dinosaurs of the suborder Marginocephalia or a cartilaginous one as in the frill-necked lizard.

In technical terms, the bone-supported frill is composed of an enlarged parietal bone flanked by elongated squamosals and sometimes ringed by epoccipitals, bony knobs that gave the margin a jagged appearance. In the early 1900s, the parietal bone was known among paleontologists as the dermosupraoccipital. The feature is now referred to as the parietosquamosal frill. In some genera, such as Triceratops, Pentaceratops, Centrosaurus and Torosaurus, this extension is very large. Despite the neck frill predominantly being made of hard bone, some neck frills are made of skin, as is the case with the frill-necked lizard of today that resides in Australia. The use of the neck frill in dinosaurs is uncertain; it may have been used for thermoregulation or simply as a defense mechanism. Indeed, during battles for territory, competing Triceratops crashed heads together with their elongated horns and the neck frill may have been employed as a kind of shield, protecting the rest of the animal from harm.

The theropod Dilophosaurus is frequently depicted with an expandable neck frill in fiction, mainly due to its portrayal in the Jurassic Park franchise, but there is no evidence for this.

Usage of the neck frill in modern reptiles is better documented. Two chief and disparate examples are the horned lizards (genus Phrynosoma) with a bony frill, and the frill-necked lizard (genus Chlamydosaurus) with a cartilaginous frill. The frill-necked lizard's frill is mainly made up of flaps of skin, which are usually coloured pink, supported by cartilaginous spines. Frill-necked lizards puff out these neck frills on either side of its head when threatened. The lizards often raise their frills when battling for territory or when coming into contact with another lizard, especially during mating season. Acoustic measurements from the frill-necked lizard suggest that the frill does not affect binaural hearing for localization but may increase gain for sounds from directly in front of the lizard.

Numerous other animals of both modern and prehistoric times use both skin or bone protrusions to make themselves seem more threatening, attract mates or to thermoregulate. Examples of these are the usage of dewlaps and crests in lizards, dinosaurs and birds. The unusual red-fan parrot has a feathery neck frill which is used for display purposes.

== See also ==
- Armour (zoology)
- Crest
- Dewlap
