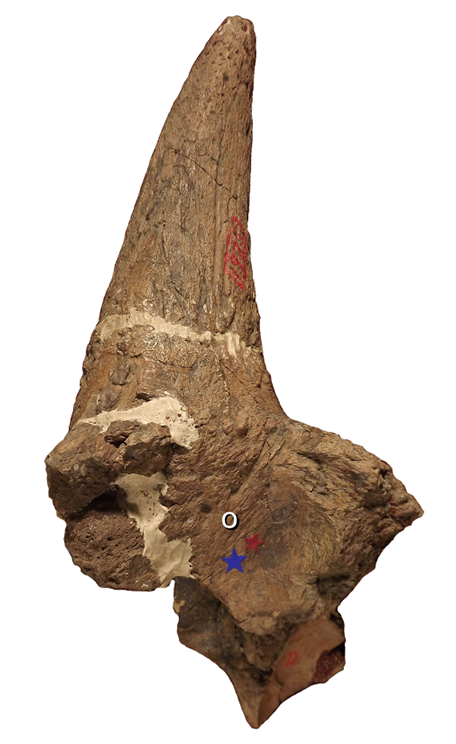
- Holotype left horncore

Scientific classification
- Kingdom: Animalia
- Phylum: Chordata
- Class: Reptilia
- Clade: Dinosauria
- Clade: †Ornithischia
- Clade: †Ceratopsia
- Family: †Ceratopsidae
- Subfamily: †Ceratopsinae; Marsh, 1888 sensu Abel, 1919
- Genus: †Ceratops; Marsh, 1888
- Species: †C. montanus

Binomial name
- †Ceratops montanus Marsh, 1888

Synonyms
- Proceratops montanus (Marsh, 1888) Lull, 1906; Triceratops montanus (Marsh, 1888) Ostrom & Wellnhofer, 1986

= Ceratops =

Ceratops Temporal range: Late Cretaceous, 77.5 Ma

Extinct genus of dinosaurs

Ceratops (meaning 'horn face') is a dubious genus of herbivorous ceratopsian dinosaur which lived during the Late Cretaceous. Its fossils have been found in the Judith River Formation in Montana. Although poorly known, Ceratops is important in the history of dinosaurs, since it is the type genus for which both the Ceratopsia and the Ceratopsidae have been named.

== History ==
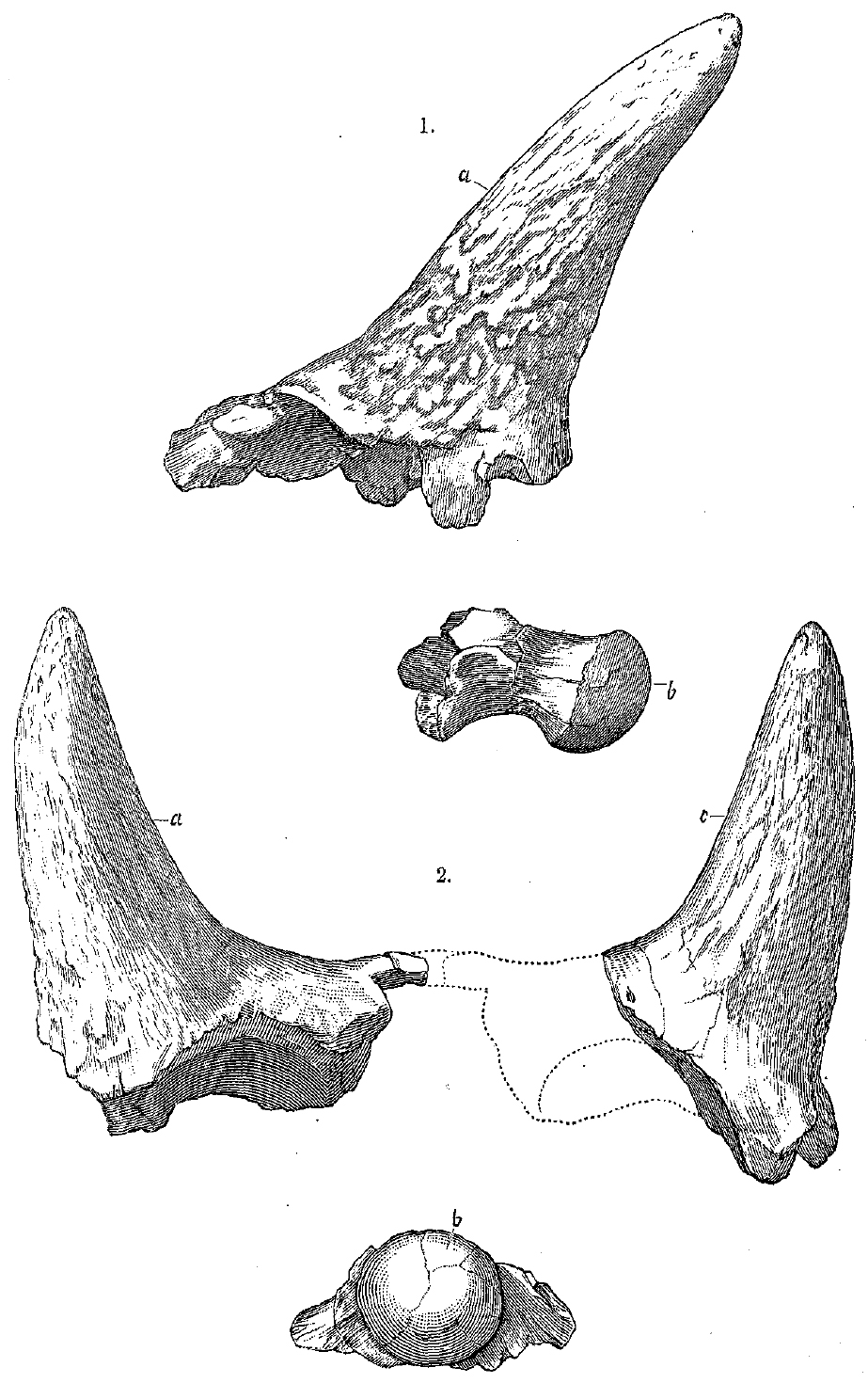
Illustration of the type specimen by Marsh

The first remains referred to Ceratops — an occipital condyle and a pair of horn cores — were found by John Bell Hatcher (1861–1904) in the late summer of 1888 near the Cow Creek in Blaine County in the uppermost Judith River Formation of Montana. Hatcher was at the time employed by Professor Othniel Charles Marsh who the same year named the find as the type species Ceratops montanus. The generic name was derived from Greek κέρας, keras, "horn", and ὤψ, ops, "face". The specific name referred to Montana. Marsh originally believed the animal to be similar to Stegosaurus, but with two horns on the back of its head, a body length of twenty-five to thirty feet, horizontal plates on its back and bipedal. According to Marsh it would have "represented a very strange appearance". In his illustration of the horn pair, purportedly showing them from behind, Marsh had switched their position and rotated their outside to the rear to make them point inwards.

The holotype, USNM 2411, was found in a layer dating from the Campanian. It consists, apart from the occipital condyle, of two supraorbital horn cores of about twenty-two centimetres length. The right horn is attached to a part of the prefrontal. Marsh later referred two squamosals to the species, specimens USNM 4802 and USNM 2415. These however are more likely centrosaurine; they have also been referred to Avaceratops.

In 1906 Richard Swann Lull noted that the name Ceratops had been preoccupied by a bird, Ceratops Rafinesque 1815, but also that this had been an undescribed nomen nudum, causing the name to have been still available in 1888. He nevertheless provisionally proposed a replacement name: Proceratops. This is thus a junior synonym of Ceratops.

Already in the early twentieth century new finds made it increasingly difficult to distinguish the limited remains of Ceratops from several other related forms. Today, Ceratops is considered a nomen dubium. However, from time to time claims are made about discoveries that, also taking into regard their provenance, might have a provable connection with the Ceratops holotype.

In 1995, David Trexler and F.G. Sweeney noted that complete material from a bonebed that had been found in Montana could enable Ceratops to be reexamined. The site, known as the Mansfield Bonebed, belongs to the same stratigraphic level as the one that yielded the original Ceratops remains. It had initially been interpreted as containing Styracosaurus, but what earlier authors considered the frill spikes of Styracosaurus turned out to be chasmosaurine orbital horns. Trexler and Sweeney pointed out that these horns closely resembled those of Ceratops, and could allow the genus to be rescued as a valid name. The ceratopsids in the bonebed were later referred to the genus Albertaceratops, and later re-classified in their own genus, Medusaceratops.

In 1999, Paul Penkalski and Peter Dodson concluded that Ceratops, despite being a nomen dubium because the material is too meager, appeared closely related to Avaceratops which may even be a juvenile Ceratops; there is not enough material to prove it.

=== Later species ===
In 1889 Marsh named a second species of Ceratops: Ceratops horridus. This would almost immediately in a subsequent article be renamed into Triceratops horridus. Ceratops horridus is thus the type species of Triceratops. In the same article Marsh renamed Bison alticornis, his misidentification of ceratopsid material for a giant bovid, into Ceratops alticornis. In 1890 Marsh renamed Hadrosaurus paucidens into Ceratops paucidens; but the original assessment of Hatcher that this represented hadrosaurid material is probably correct.

In 1905 Hatcher renamed three Monoclonius species into Ceratops species: Monoclonius recurvicornis Cope 1889 became Ceratops recurvicornis; Monoclonius belli Lambe 1902 was made Ceratops belli and Monoclonius canadensis Lambe 1902 was renamed Ceratops canadensis. C. canadensis later was made the separate genus Eoceratops, and C. belli was made the separate genus Chasmosaurus; in 1925 William King Gregory concluded that Ceratops and Chasmosaurus were identical, but this was rejected by most researchers.

In 2005, remarkably well preserved cranial and postcranial elements of a Judithian ceratopsian were discovered in Fergus County, Montana. Nicknamed "Judith", preliminary examination suggested a close affinity with C. montanus. The locality has been determined to be on or in close proximity to the stratigraphic layer of C. montanus, and not too many miles away. In 2016, the new animal was named Spiclypeus, and the authors stated that it may be identical to Ceratops, which they considered a nomen dubium, or a growth stage of Albertaceratops.

=== Species list ===
The naming history can be summarised in a species list.

- Ceratops montanus Marsh 1888: nomen dubium; type species of Ceratops Marsh 1888; = Proceratops montanus (Marsh 1888) Lull 1906
- Ceratops horridus Marsh 1889: = Triceratops horridus (Marsh 1889) Marsh 1889
- Ceratops alticornis (Marsh 1887) Marsh 1889: nomen dubium; = Bison alticornis Marsh 1887, = Triceratops alticornis (Marsh 1887) Lull vide Hatcher, Marsh & Lull 1907
- Ceratops paucidens (Marsh 1889) Marsh 1890: nomen dubium; = Hadrosaurus paucidens Marsh 1889; perhaps material of Lambeosaurus lambei
- Ceratops belli (Lambe 1902) Hatcher vide Stanton & Hatcher 1905: = Monoclonius belli Lambe 1902; = Chasmosaurus belli (Lambe 1902) Lambe 1914
- Ceratops canadensis (Lambe 1902) Hatcher vide Stanton & Hatcher 1905: = Monoclonius canadensis Lambe 1902; = Eoceratops canadensis (Lambe 1902) Lambe 1915
- Ceratops recurvicornis (Cope 1889) Hatcher vide Stanton & Hatcher 1905: = Monoclonius recurvicornis Cope 1889

== Classification ==
Ceratops was placed by Marsh in the Ceratopsidae in 1888. It thus belonged to the Ceratopsia, a group of herbivorous dinosaurs with parrot-like beaks which thrived in North America and Asia during the Late Cretaceous Period, which ended roughly 66 million years ago. In 1919 the group Ceratopsinae was named by Othenio Lothar Franz Anton Louis Abel, but this concept is problematic: Paul Sereno has defined it as equivalent to the Chasmosaurinae but other researchers limit it to Ceratops itself as its direct relationships are uncertain.

== Diet ==
Ceratops, like all ceratopsians, was a herbivore biting off plant material with its beak and processing it with its tooth batteries.

== See also ==
- Timeline of ceratopsian research
