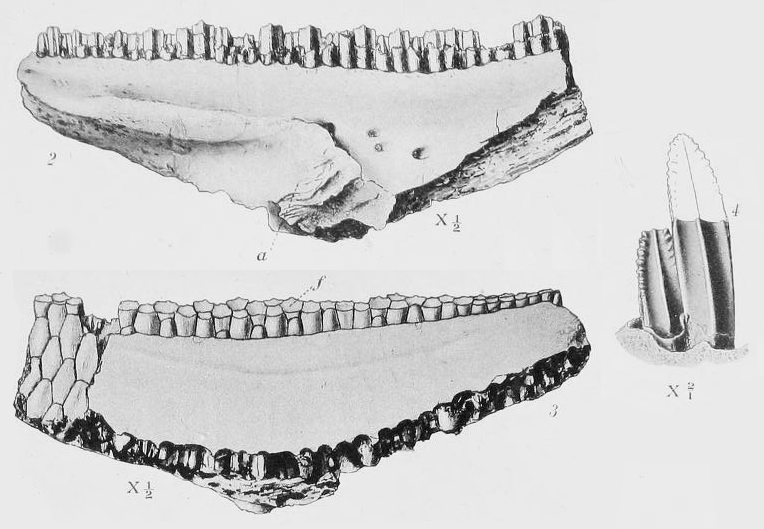
- Holotype maxilla CMN 1092

Scientific classification
- Kingdom: Animalia
- Phylum: Chordata
- Class: Reptilia
- Clade: Dinosauria
- Clade: †Ornithischia
- Clade: †Ornithopoda
- Family: †Hadrosauridae
- Genus: †Didanodon; Osborn, 1902

Type species
- †Didanodon altidens (Lambe, 1902)

Synonyms
- Trachodon (Pteropelyx) altidens Lambe, 1902; Procheneosaurus altidens (Lambe, 1902) Lull & Wright, 1942

= Didanodon =

Didanodon Temporal range: Late Cretaceous, Campanian

Dubious hadrosaurid dinosaur genus from Late Cretaceous Canada

Didanodon (meaning "beautiful-sided tooth") is a dubious genus of hadrosaurid from the Campanian Dinosaur Park Formation of Alberta.

== History and naming ==
It was named in 1902 by Canadian palaeontologist Lawrence M. Lambe for a left maxilla with teeth as the new species T. altidens, within the genus Trachodon and subgenus Pteropelyx. Lambe distinguished T. altidens by its distinctly narrow tooth crowns, with the name as a reference to their height relative to breadth, and the distance they project above the margin of the bone. Lambe compared the teeth to those of the species Trachodon mirabilis, Trachodon (Pteropelyx) selwyni, Trachodon (Pteropelyx) marginatus, and Pteropelyx grallipes. In the same publication, American palaeontologist Henry Fairfield Osborn summarized the fauna of the mid-Cretaceous across all of North America, and even provided the possible new genus name Didanodon for the species as T. (Didanodon) altidens.

Didanodon altidens was followed as a genus of hadrosaurid by Canadian palaeontologist Loris S. Russell in 1930, who suggested that it may be the same genus as the taxon "Procheneosaurus" also from the DPF in Alberta. A similar belief was followed by American palaeontologists Richard Swann Lull and Nelda E. Wright in 1942, although they treated Procheneosaurus as the valid genus and referred "T." altidens to it as Procheneosaurus altidens. Lull and Wright noted particular similarities to the teeth of Tetragonosaurus cranibrevis (which they considered more properly called Procheneosaurus cranibrevis) as justification for the referral to Procheneosaurus.

Trachodon altidens is now recognized as an undiagnostic taxon of hadrosaurid, along with the other species of Trachodon and Pteropelyx, though Didanodon has at the same time been listed as a synonym of Lambeosaurus or an invalid name.
