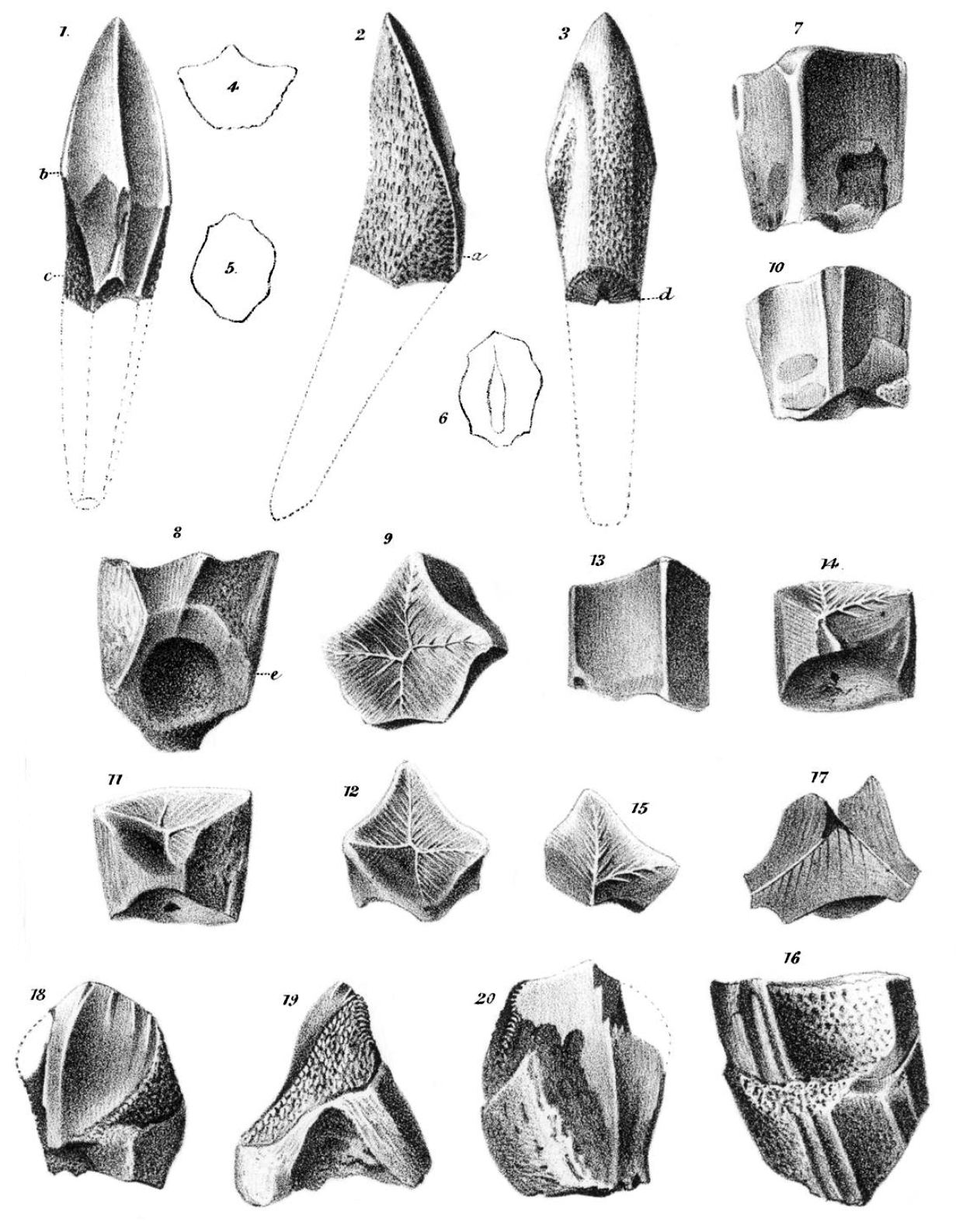
- Illustration of some of Leidy's original Trachodon teeth, including the holotype (1-6)

Scientific classification
- Kingdom: Animalia
- Phylum: Chordata
- Class: Reptilia
- Clade: Dinosauria
- Clade: †Ornithischia
- Clade: †Ornithopoda
- Family: †Hadrosauridae
- Genus: †Trachodon; Leidy, 1856
- Species: †T. mirabilis

Binomial name
- †Trachodon mirabilis Leidy, 1856

= Trachodon =

Trachodon Temporal range: Late Cretaceous, 77 Ma

Dubious extinct genus of dinosaurs

Trachodon (meaning "rough tooth") is a dubious genus of hadrosaurid dinosaur from the Upper Cretaceous of what is now Montana in the western United States. The only species is T. mirabilis, though many others have been assigned to the genus. T. mirabilis was described by Joseph Leidy in 1856 based on a set of teeth; however, this was later shown to be a mixture of hadrosaurid and ceratopsian teeth. These fossils were unearthed in 1856 by Ferdinand Vandeveer Hayden during an expedition to the Missouri River in Montana, USA, in rock from the Judith River Formation. This formation dates to the Campanian stage of the Late Cretaceous, which lasted from 79 to 75.3 million years ago. One of the teeth, an incomplete hadrosaurid tooth, was later chosen as the holotype.

Trachodon was the first hadrosaurid to be named. Several specimens, including complete skeletons of what is now considered Edmontosaurus annectens, were mistakenly assigned to the genus or T. mirabilis. Additionally, many species erected for Trachodon, such as T. marginatus, are now in their own genus or are nomen dubia, like T. selwyni. The taxon coexisted with other ornithischians, including hadrosaurids like Corythosaurus, ceratopsians like Lokiceratops and Medusaceratops, and pachycephalosaurids like Hanssuesia. Carnivorous theropod dinosaurs have been unearthed as well, such as the tyrannosaurid Daspletosaurus and the troodontid Troodon. Several other dubious dinosaur genera were named from the formation as well, such as Deinodon, Palaeoscincus, and possibly Troodon. During the Campanian, the Judith River Formation was a vast floodplain on along the western coast of the Western Interior Seaway and blanked by ferns, conifers, cycads, and angiosperms.

== History and classification ==
=== Discovery and early nomenclature ===
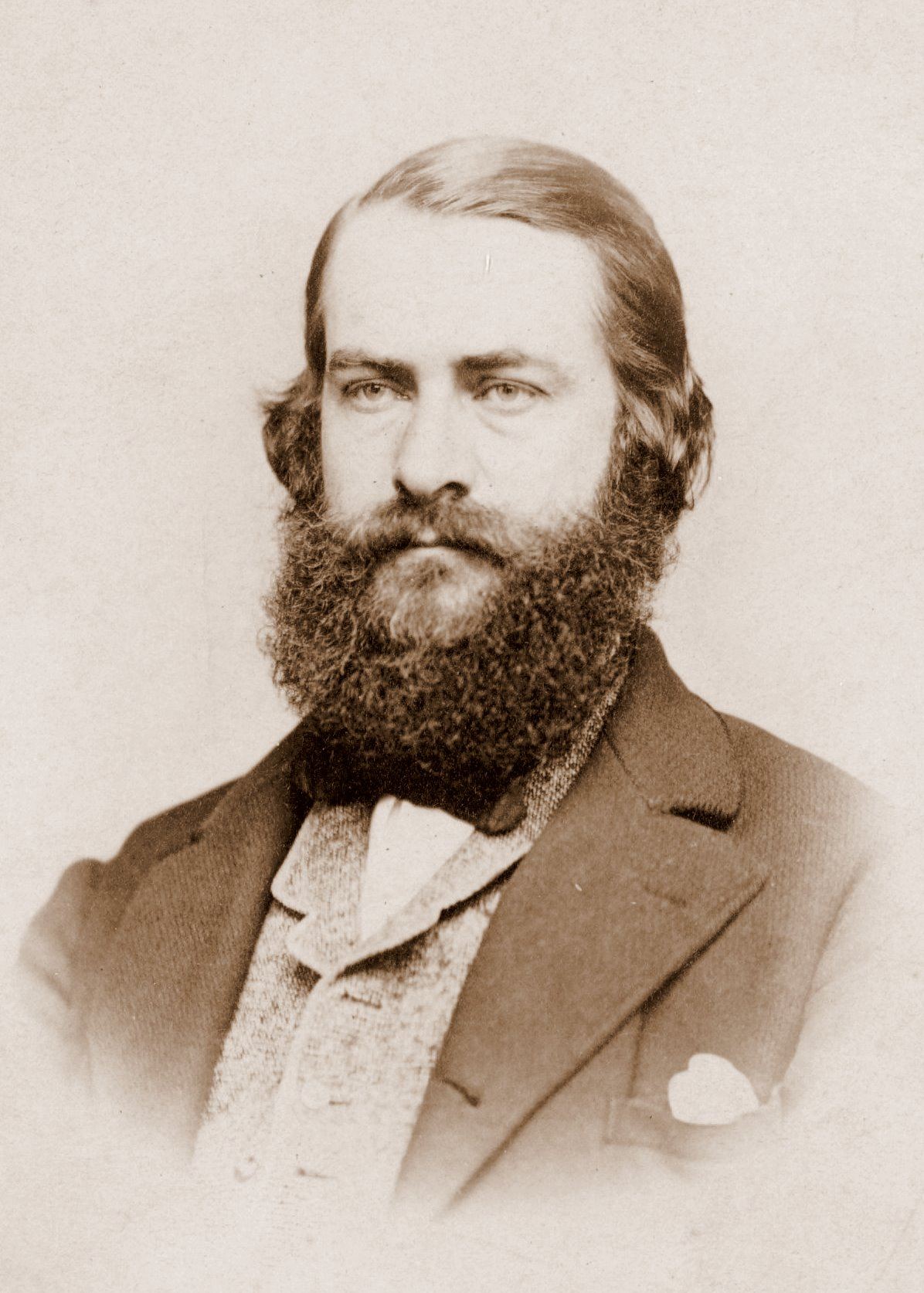
Joseph Leidy, who named Trachodon

In 1856, Joseph Leidy received fragmentary remains from the Judith River Formation, collected by Ferdinand Vandeveer Hayden. From these bones, he provided the first names for North American dinosaurs: Deinodon, Palaeoscincus, Trachodon, and Troodon (then spelled Troödon). The type species of Trachodon is T. mirabilis. The generic name is derived from Greek τραχυς, trakhys, "rough", and όδον, odon, "tooth", referring to the granulate inner surface of one of the teeth. The specific name means "marvelous" in Latin. Trachodon was based on several unassociated teeth, of which the tooth ANSP 9260 has been taken as the holotype. Leidy believed the teeth to belong to a relative of Iguanodon, and Trachodon would come to be recognized as the first known hadrosaur. However, only two of the teeth (including ANSP 9260), possessing a single root, are truly hadrosaurian. Others, with double roots, in fact belonged to ceratopsians.

Later in the same year, Leidy would name the genus and species Thespesius occidentalis based on hadrosaurid tail vertebrae and a phalanx from the Lance Formation of South Dakota, and in 1859 he named Hadrosaurus foulkii based on a partial skeleton from the Woodbury Formation of New Jersey. By 1860, however, he began to question the relationship between these remains. He published on these concerns in 1865, speculating that Trachodon and Thespesius may represent the same animal, with the distinct tail vertebrae of Hadrosaurus maintaining its distinctiveness.

Leidy's further statements, which were often contradictory, would go on to confuse later palaeontologists. By a short 1868 publication he had come to regret the name Trachodon, feeling that Hadrosaurus (meaning "bulky lizard") was a more appropriate name. Furthermore, he had by now become aware the single and double rooted teeth of Trachodon belonged to different animals, suggesting that Trachodon could come to refer to the double rooted (ceratopsian) teeth, with Hadrosaurus referring to the single rooted (hadrosaur) ones and inheriting the name Hadrosaurus mirabilis. Whether he intended this to be a formal taxonomic action was, however, unclear. In 1870 he made another short publication, noting tooth characteristics that may indicate Hadrosaurus mirabilis (the single rooted "Trachodon" teeth) was a distinct genus from Hadrosaurus foulkii; seemingly, he did not believe Trachodon an appropriate name for the former. As in 1860, he wondered if Thespesius represented the same animal as the original Trachodon teeth. However, he noted that differing vertebral characteristics demonstrated Thespesius was distinct from both Hadrosaurus and Trachodon, in spite of the latter not being associated with any vertebrae.

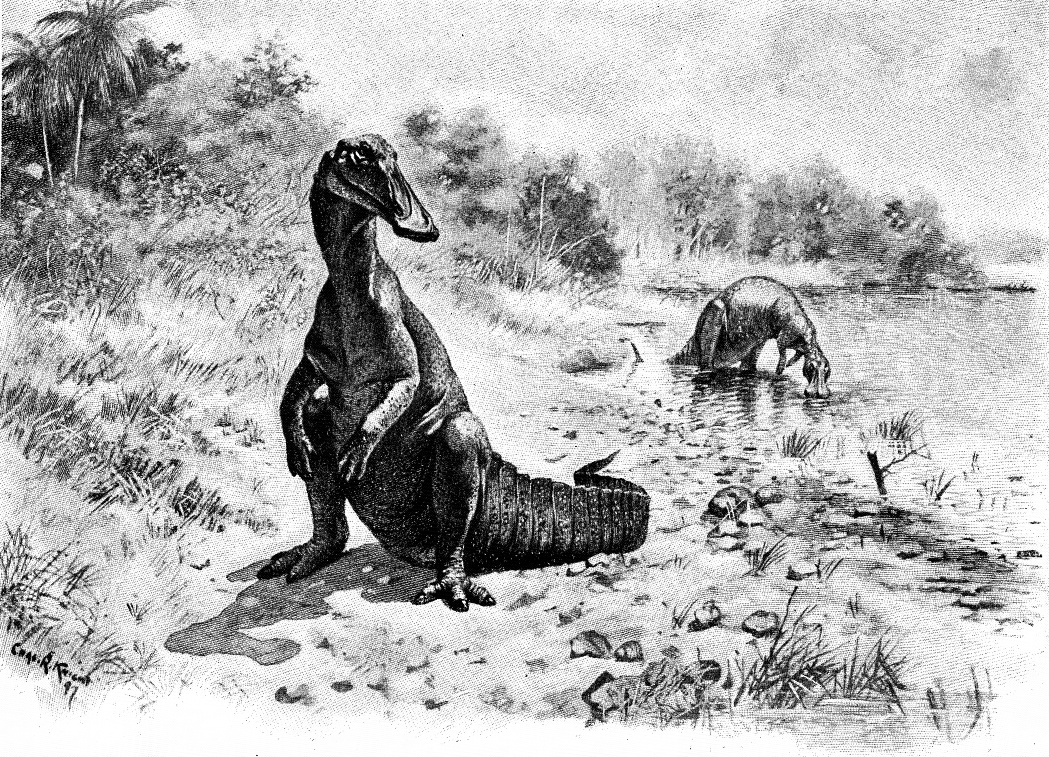
Restoration of "Hadrosaurus mirabilis" by Charles R. Knight, based on Cope's 1882 skeleton, published in an 1897 article

In the wake of Leidy's work, Edward Drinker Cope published much of the following work on early hadrosaurs. In an 1869 paper he assigned all of Leidy's species to the genus Hadrosaurus, including H. mirabilis, and named the family Hadrosauridae to include Hadrosaurus, its later synonym Ornithotarsus, and Hypsibema. In 1876 he named the genus Diclonius, with three species, each based also on teeth. The following year, he split Leidy's original sample of Trachodon teeth between the species Trachodon mirabilis, Diclonius perangulatus, and Dysganus haydenianus. In 1882 fossil collectors R. S. Hill and J. L. Wortman, working for Cope, collected the first complete skeleton of a hadrosaur. Cope would produce a preliminary publication on the specimen in 1883, and assigned it to the species mirabilis. However, viewing Leidy as having abandoned the genus Trachodon, Cope used his own genus name Diclonius, producing the binomial Diclonius mirabilis for the species. Why Cope believed the skeleton belonged to the same species as Leidy's original hadrosaur teeth, and why he allied it to Diclonius instead of creating a new genus, was not entirely clear and subject to speculations of later authors. In 1888, Richard Lydekker named the species Trachodon cantabridgiensis based on a tooth from the Cambridge Greensand of England, recognizing it alongside T. mirabilis in a distinct Trachodon of which Hadrosaurus was a synonym. Consequently, he established the name Trachodontidae as a replacement for Hadrosauridae.

=== Wide acceptance of Trachodon ===
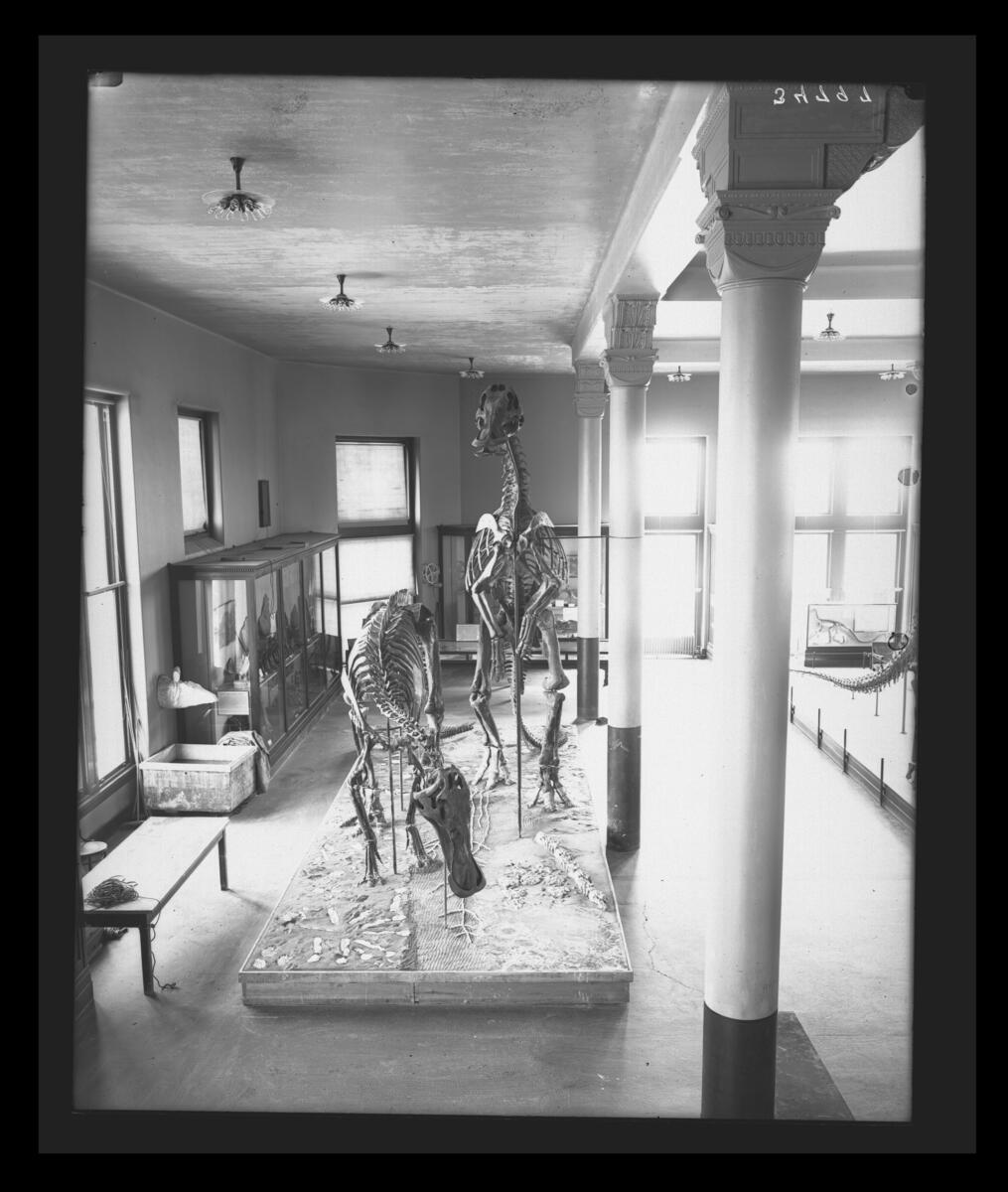
Skeletons displayed as Trachodon mirabilis at the American Museum of Natural History in 1916

Around the turn of the century, the nomenclature of hadrosaurs including the species mirabilis would remain inconsistent. A 1897 article by journalist William Ballou would use the name Hadrosaurus mirabilis, possibly influenced by curator of the American Museum of Natural History (AMNH), Henry Fairfield Osborn. Promotion and correspondence by the AMNH would variously use the names Hadrosaurus, Diclonius, and Claosaurus to contain the species and refer to Cope's skeleton and others being excavated in the American West. Othniel Charles Marsh, Cope's rival, had endorsed Trachodon as the senior synonym of Hadrosaurus and also Diclonius. This position was shared by Oliver Perry Hay in a 1902 paper. Both, however, recognized several other hadrosaur genera distinct from Trachodon.

In 1902, John Bell Hatcher would publish a review all members of Trachodontidae (which he used over the term Hadrosauridae), concluding that of ten established genera, only Trachodon and Marsh's Claosaurus were valid. All others (Thespesius, Hadrosaurus, Ornithotarsus, Cionodon, Polyonax, Diclonius, Pteropelyx, and Claorhynchus) were considered to be synonyms of Trachodon. How many species were synonymous within the lumped Trachodon was a matter he, however, considered uncertain. Some of these, such as Claorhynchus and Polyonax, would later turn out to represent ceratopsians. Part of Hatcher's reasoning for lumping these taxa was that he saw the Judith horizon of Trachodon and the Lancian horizon of Thespesius as being deposited at the same time, whereas Claosaurus was from earlier strata. Special attention was given to Claosaurus annectens, a second species of Claosaurus named by Marsh in 1892 based on a nearly complete skeleton from Lancian rocks in Wyoming. Due to its differing geologic age, he considered it unlikely it belonged to the genus Claosaurus, and he saw no anatomical grounds for recognizing it as a distinct genus from Trachodon. Thus, he reassigned it as Trachodon annectens, a second species only slightly different from T. mirabilis.

Canadian palaeontologist Lawrence Lambe named three new species of Trachodon from the Belly River Group in 1902. He considered Pteropelyx a subgenus of Trachodon, and referred each new species to Trachodon (Pteropelyx). T. selwyni, named after Alfred Selwyn was based on a jawbone and distinguished on teeth characteristics, and Lambe supposed an isolated jawbone and femur also belonged to the species. T. marginatus was based on a partial skeleton, with the left forelimb being best represented. Lambe would later give it the distinct genus Stephanosaurus. T. altidens, for which Lambe provisionally suggested the distinct genus Didanodon, was based on a jawbone. Each would eventually go on to be considered dubious.

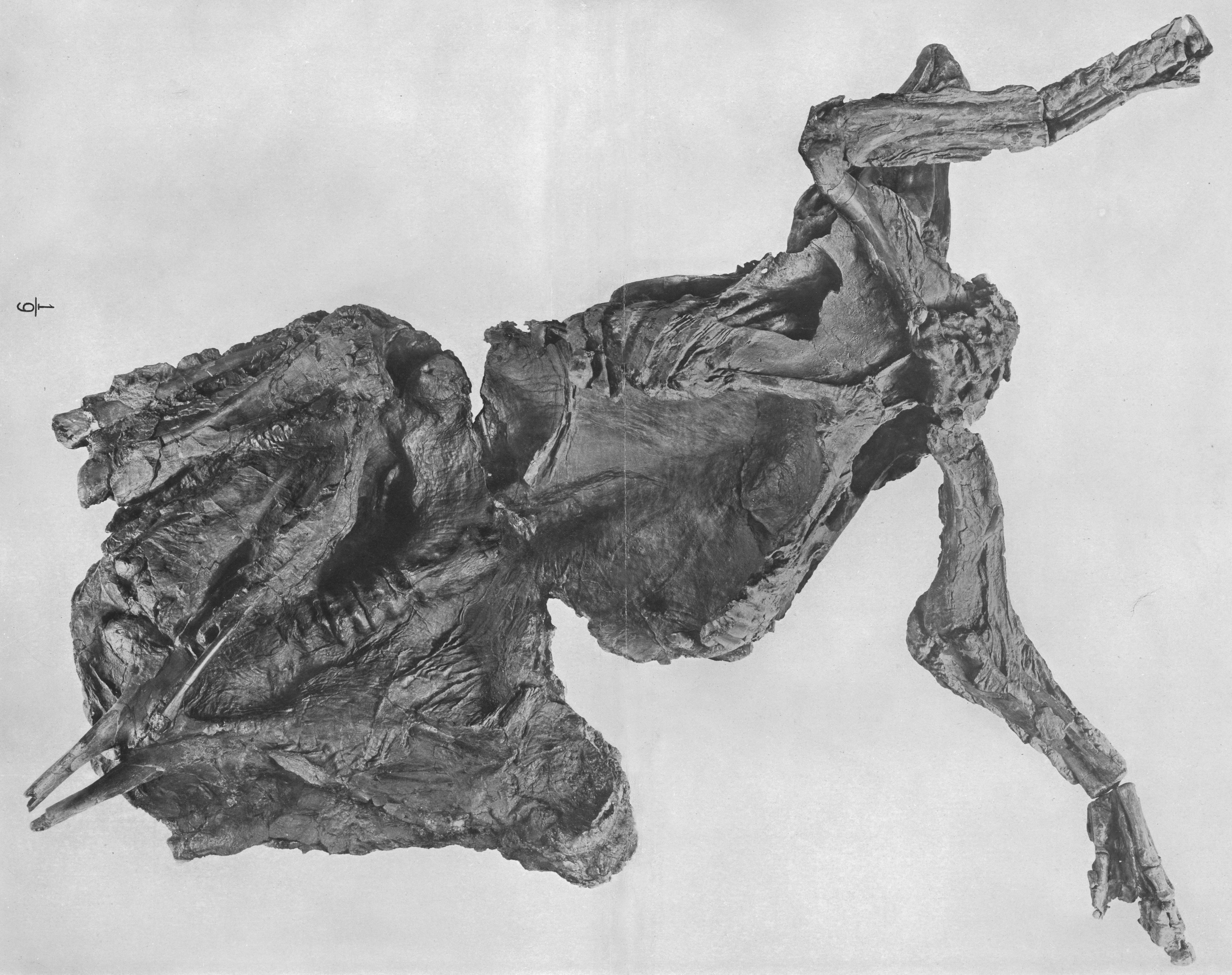
"Trachodon mummy" discovered in 1908

The American Museum of Natural History had acquired Cope's fossil collection in 1899, including his "Diclonius mirabilis" skeleton, giving it the specimen number AMNH 5730. In 1904, Oscar Hunter had found another hadrosaur skeleton; the museum purchased it in 1906 and Barnum Brown excavated it. Most of the bones missing in Cope's specimens were preserved (though both were missing the end of the tail), and it was noted for its articulated spinal column. The two specimens were mounted in the museum's Hall of Fossil Reptiles in 1908 under the name Trachodon mirabilis. The Cope specimen was mounted in a four legged posture as if feeding, intended to make its well preserved skull open for examination. The second skeleton was posed in an erect posture on two legs, watching for danger, in order to hide its more imperfect skull from view. The base below modeled a shoreline, representing the preservational environment of the specimens and presumed aquatic habits suspected by Brown. Shortly after the completion of the display, Charles Hazelius Sternberg and his sons discovered a mummified hadrosaur specimen (AMNH 5060), covered in skin impressions (some had also been preserved with Cope's specimen, but mostly destroyed in excavation). It too was interpreted as a specimen of Trachodon, though Osborn considered it a T. annectens.

=== Decline of usage and abandonment ===
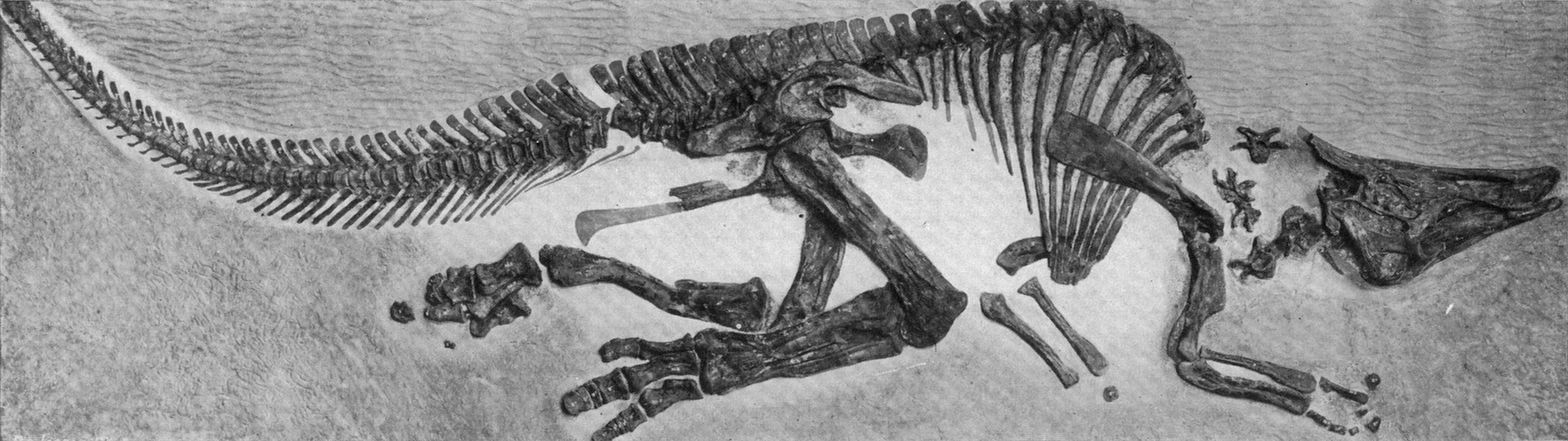
The discovery of new hadrosaur genera such as Saurolophus caused a shift away from the usage of Trachodon

Brown's excavations in the American west and Alberta, Canada would continue to uncover "trachodont" (hadrosaur) skeletons, and in 1910 and 1912 respectively he established the new genera Kritosaurus and Saurolophus for two such skeletons. This represented the first major break from Hatcher's paradigm of Trachodon dominating hadrosaur taxonomy. By 1914 Brown recognized seven genera in Trachodontidae, and so he established the subfamilies Trachodontinae for crestless taxa such as Trachodon and Saurolophinae for those bearing prominent headcrests, such as Saurolophus and Corythosaurus. Amongst the former he recognized the genus Hadrosaurus as distinct from Trachodon. In light of the proliferation of taxa, in 1915 Charles W. Gilmore returned to Hatcher's conclusions, regretting that Trachodon had come to be so widely used without taxonomic caution. He noted the insufficient nature of Leidy's original teeth for identification at the species level (something even Hatcher was aware of). Furthermore, he noted distinction between the number of teeth in Judith and Lancian hadrosaurs. Consequently, he considered the longstanding conclusion that Cope's specimen and others belonged to Trachodon mirabilis, and instead he placed them in a revived Thespesius occidentalis. As for Trachodon, he suggested it would be appropriate to use it as the name for one of the species from older strata (as an age difference between the Judith and Lance had now been appreciated).

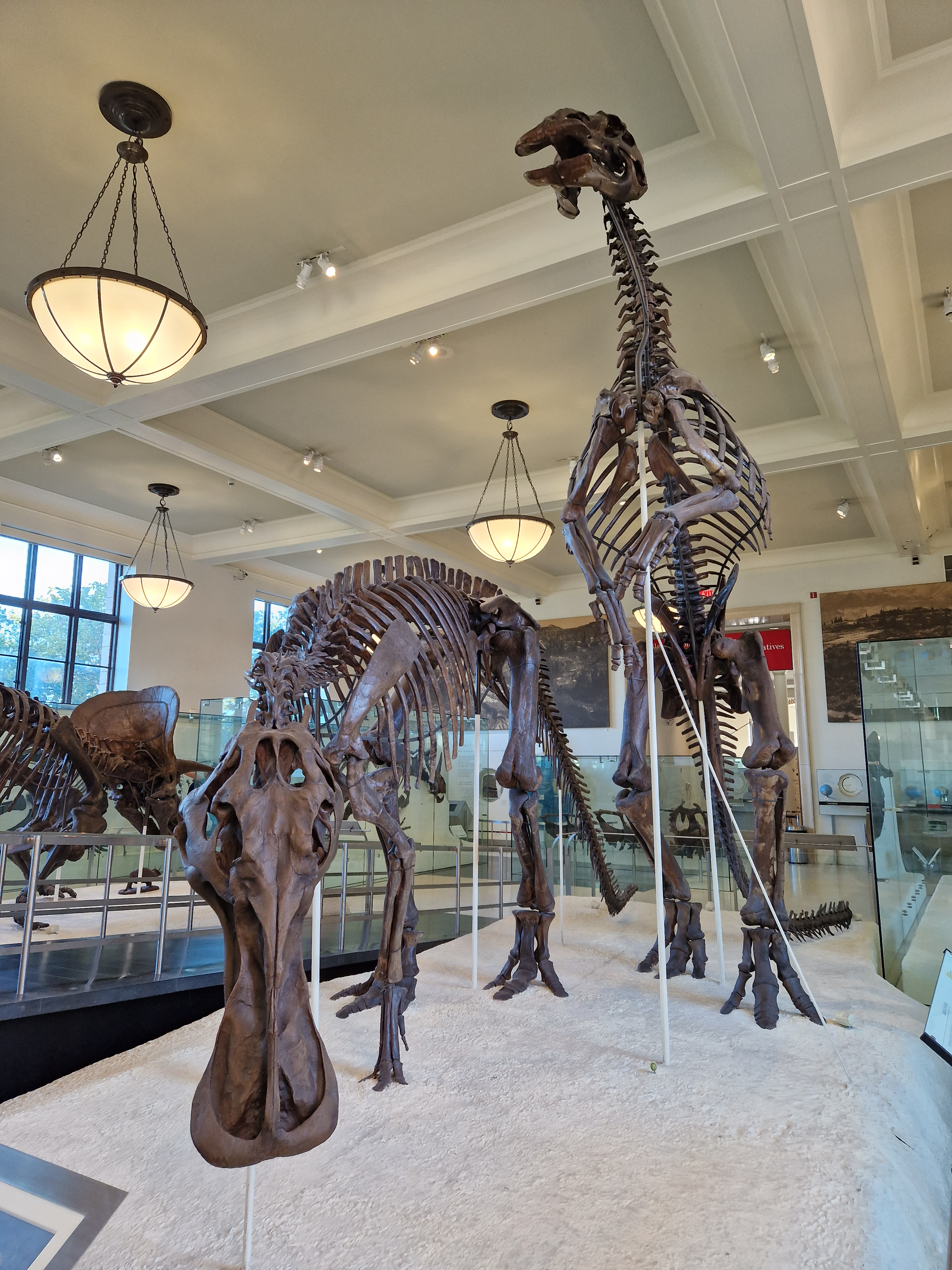
The original "Trachodon" mounts still stand today, now recognized as Edmontosaurus annectens specimens

Lambe would publish a study in 1918, also cautioning against the extensive usage of Trachodon. If it was to be used, he argued it must stand based on the identification of the original single-rooted tooth. He noted that the tooth seemed distinct in anatomy from that known in any hadrosaur. Thus, he considered it possible it represented a distinct species from any other then known. However, he also noted it was possible the tooth did not represent ordinary dental anatomy, and would thus be entirely useless for taxonomic purposes, with Trachodon consequently abandoned from use. He also noted that several of the other genera and species Hatcher synonymized with Trachodon were, themselves, based on insufficient material and required extensive revision. The complete skeletons referred to T. mirabilis were suggested to be retained in the genus Diclonius, oweing to their historical association with the name. William Parks supported the disuse of Trachodon in 1920, noting that Lambe's argument against Trachodon was made with good reason.

Lambe also noted the seniority of Hadrosauridae over Trachodontidae, which had been the dominant term for hadrosaurs since Hatcher's paper. Likewise, he deprecated Trachodontinae in favor of Hadrosaurinae for the flat-crested forms. In a 1936 paper Charles Mortram Sternberg (son of Charles Hazelius) attempted to identify whether Trachodon represented a flat-crested (hadrosaurine) or crested (by then, lambeosaurine) hadrosaur as a basis for any future use of the genus. He concluded it represented a lambeosaur, though preferred to retain the term Lambeosaurinae over bringing back the term Trachodontinae.

In 1942, Richard Swann Lull and Nelda Wright published a monograph titled Hadrosaurian Dinosaurs of North America, based on an unrealized monograph on Ornithopoda planned by Cope. As with prior authors, they disassociated the original Trachodon teeth from later skeletons. Like prior authors, they noticed the distinct rough texture of the tooth. However, they made the novel observation of similar but much fainter rough texturing on teeth belonging to Hadrosaurus. In the wake of this observation, it became clear that the tooth of Trachodon was a freshly deposited tooth, and its rough texture was not a trait identifying it taxonomically but instead due to the tooth not having been worn down by use in chewing. Without this distinguishing trait, it was considered impossible to determine which of several hadrosaurs from the same time period Trachodon belonged to. Following this, the name fell into scientific disuse as a dubious name. In the realm of pop culture, however, the name would persist in contexts like books well into future decades. Regarding Cope's skeleton and the other material later referred to Trachodon, Lull and Wright named the genus Anatosaurus to contain T. annectens, and established the species Anatosaurus copei for Cope's skeleton and the 1904 specimen. Both species, eventually, be subsumed into the single species Edmontosaurus annectens.

== Species ==
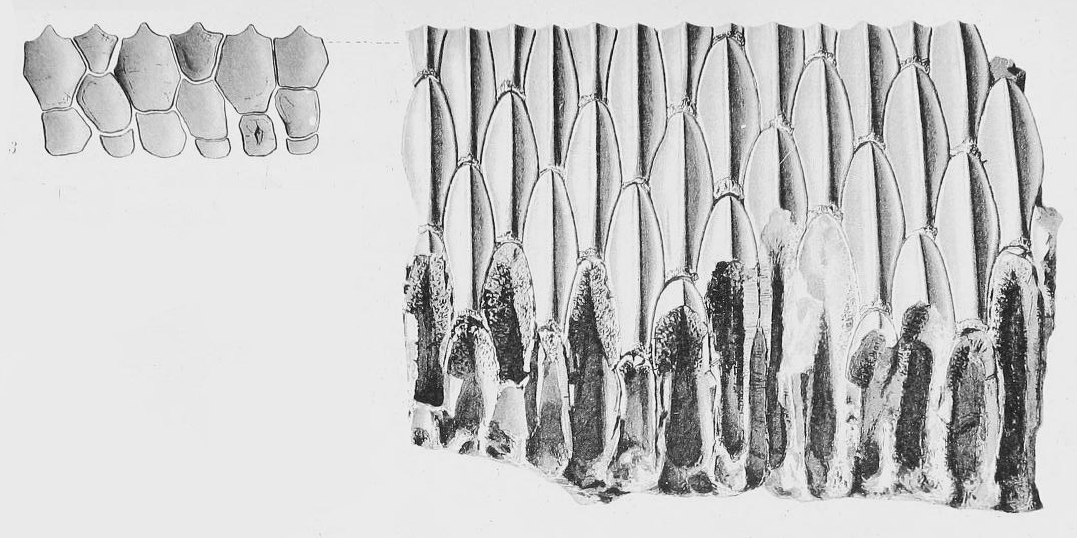
T. selwyni teeth

Numerous species have been referred to this genus.

Type species: T. mirabilis Leidy, 1856

Other species:

- T. (Pteropelyx) altidens was described by Lambe in 1902 on the basis of a left maxilla with teeth that was found in the Upper Cretaceous-aged strata of the Dinosaur Park Formation in Alberta, Canada. It has a long and convoluted history, being assigned to Prochenosaurus, Lambeosaurus, and its own genus, Didanodon. However, recent studies consider it either a nomen dubium and indeterminate hadrosaurid or as a synonym of Lambeosaurus lambei.
- T. amurense was described by Russian paleontologist Anatoly Riabinin in 1925, from a partial skeleton that was unearthed in Upper Cretaceous rocks of the Amur River banks of Heilongjiang in Manchuria Province, northern China. It was later amended to T. amurensis and now is the type species of Mandschurosaurus. However, some authors state it is a nomen dubium.
- T. cantabrigiensis was named by British paleontologist Richard Lydekker in 1888 based on a dentary tooth that was collected from the strata of the Cambridge Greensand, which dates to the Lower Cretaceous, in Cambridgeshire, England. It is now regarded as a dubious basal hadrosaurid.
- T. longiceps was named by Marsh in 1897 on the bases of a large right dentary bearing teeth from the late Maastrichtian-aged Upper Cretaceous Lance Formation of Wyoming, USA. It is now believed to be a synonym of Edmontosaurus annectens.
- T. marginatus was described by Lambe in 1902 based on a disassociated postcranial skeleton that had been found in rocks of the Belly River Group in Alberta, Canada. It has since been classified as its own genus, Stephanosaurus, a species of Kritosaurus, or an indeterminate hadrosaurid.
- T. selwyni was named by Lambe in 1902 on the basis of a dentary with teeth that was discovered in the Upper Cretaceous-aged strata of the Dinosaur Park Formation in Alberta, Canada. It is now believed to be a nomen dubium, too fragmentary to classify beyond Hadrosauridae.

Reassigned species

- T. imperfectus, Kuhn, 1964 (Young, 1944) = Sanpasaurus imperfectus Young, 1944
- T. agilis, Kuhn, 1936 (Marsh, 1890) = Claosaurus agilis Marsh, 1890
- T. annectens, Hay, 1902 (Marsh, 1892) = Edmontosaurus annectens (Marsh, 1892)
- T. imperfectus, (Kuhn, 1964) Young 1944 = Sanpasaurus imperfectus Young 1944

== Description ==
Trachodon mirabilis is known definitively from a single, isolated tooth (ANSP 9260), likely from the mandible (lower jaw). ANSP 9260 was described briefly in Leidy's 1856 description. The tooth is overall hexahedronal in shape, though is slightly bent, and measures 1.4 inches (36 mm) in length and 0.5 inches (13 mm) in maximum diameter. The exposed surface is smooth with a pronounce median ridge running the length of the tooth, while the lateral margins of the tooth have subacute lateral (side) ridges. In contrast, the tooth's interior features rough, irregular granulations. As for the base, it is broken but preserves its hollow structure. Its features lack any abrasion or wear, which, along with its rough internal surface, suggest it was a recently sprouted virgin (unused) tooth. This roughness is the origin of the genus name, however it likely is not indicative of any genus or species but instead is a result of it a being newly formed tooth.

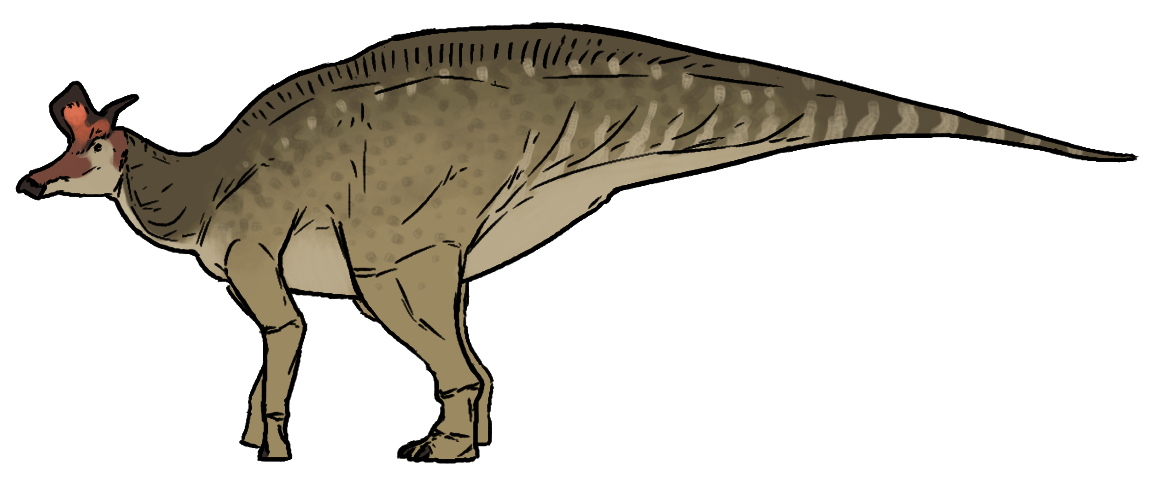
A life restoration of Lambeosaurus, a possible relative of Trachodon

As a hadrosaur, Trachodon would have had a large, long skull terminating in a beak with an extensive keratin sheath, a significant battery of teeth, and roughly triangular shaped head. It was a large hadrosaurid, with highly developed jaws full of grinding teeth, a long tail stiffened by ossified tendons that prevented it from drooping, and more elongate limbs suggesting they were semi-quadrupedal (could move on both two legs and all fours), as also shown by footprints of related animals. The hands had four fingers, lacking the thumb, and while the second, third, and fourth fingers were bunched together, the little finger was free and could have been used to manipulate objects. Each foot had only the three central toes.

If it was a lambeosaurine, Trachodon likely bore a large, thin crest made up of the premaxilla and nasal bones that could have been used for display, sound amplification, and/or species recognition. Skin impressions are known from several lambeosaurines, including Parasaurolophus, Lambeosaurus, and Corythosaurus, which indicate that they were covered in small scales with an arrangement of feature scales (larger scales within a matrix of smaller scales) as well. Most depictions of Trachodon are based on specimens now assigned to Edmontosaurus, a genus of saurolophine rather than lambeosaurine. Edmontosaurus' skull is long and low, lacks a bony crest, and bears a soft-tissue crest, unlike those of lambeosaurines.

== Paleoecology ==
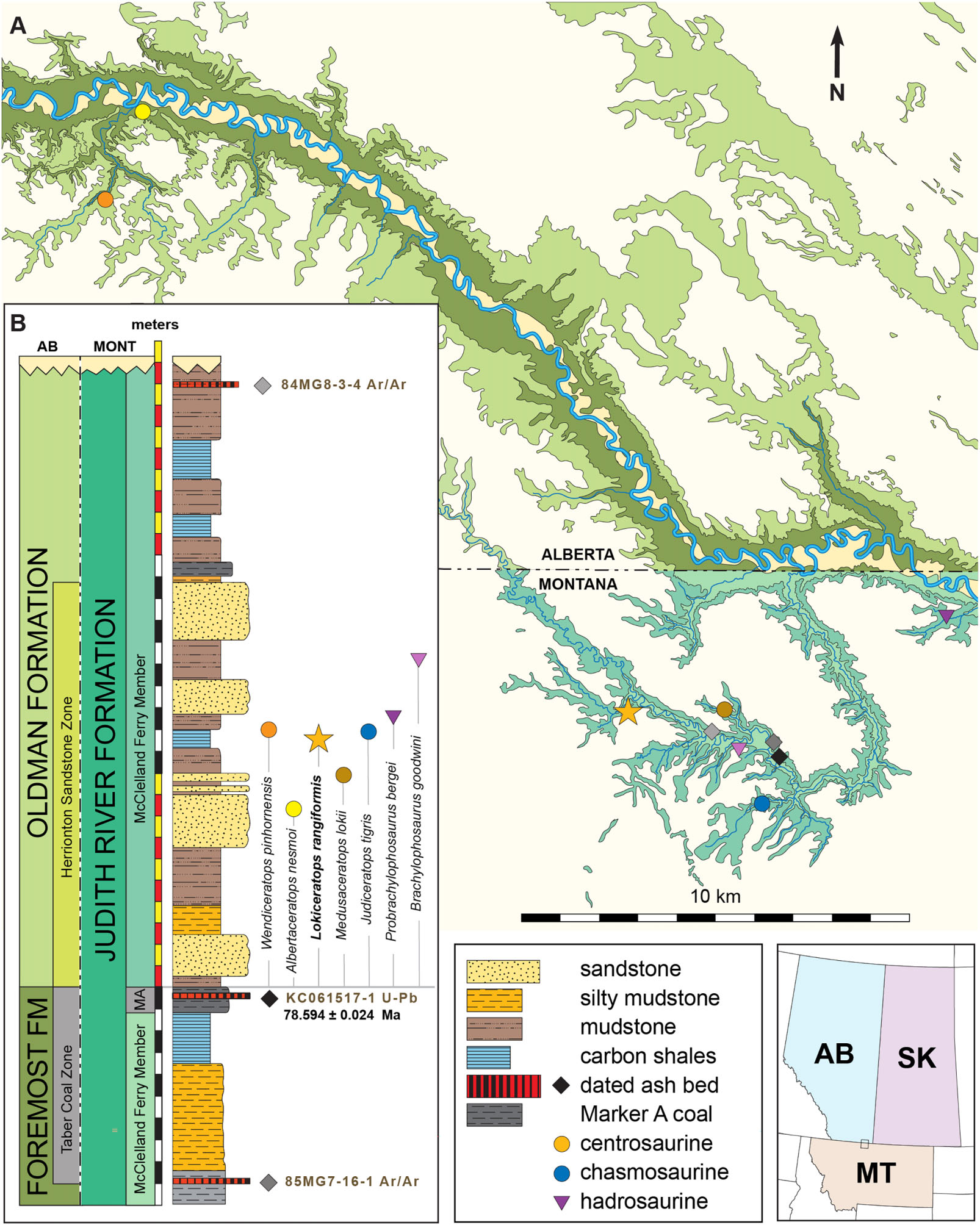
Map and stratigraphy of the Judith River Formation, where Trachodon is known

Trachodon lived in a vast floodplain along the western shore of the interior seaway. Large rivers watered the land, occasionally flooding and blanketing the region with new sediment. When water was plentiful, the region could support a great deal of plant and animal life, but periodic droughts also struck the region, resulting in mass mortality as preserved in the many bonebed deposits found in Judith River sediments, including a Daspletosaurus, a genus of large tyrannosaurid theropod, bonebed. Similar conditions exist today in East Africa. Volcanic eruptions from the west periodically blanketed the region with ash, also resulting in large-scale mortality, while simultaneously enriching the soil for future plant growth. It is these ash beds that allow precise radiometric dating as well. Fluctuating sea levels also resulted in a variety of other environments at different times and places within the Judith River Group, including offshore and nearshore marine habitats, coastal wetlands, deltas, and lagoons, in addition to the inland floodplains.

The excellent vertebrate fossil record of Judith River rocks resulted from a combination of abundant animal life, periodic natural disasters, and the deposition of large amounts of sediment. Many types of freshwater and estuarine fish are represented, including sharks, rays, sturgeons, gars, and others. The Judith River Formation preserves the remains of many aquatic amphibians and reptiles, including frogs, salamanders, turtles, Champsosaurus and crocodilians. Terrestrial lizards, including whiptails, parasaniwids, and knob-scaled lizards have also been discovered.

As for dinosaurs, a menagerie are known. Theropods are represented by tyrannosaurids like Daspletosaurus and Gorgosaurus, dromaeosaurs like Saurornitholestes and Dromaeosaurus, the possibly valid troodontid Troodon, an indeterminate, Deinocheirus-like ornithomimosaur, the bird Hesperornis, and the enigmatic Richardoestesia. Many other ornithischians have been unearthed from Judith River, such as the ankylosaurid Zuul, the hadrosaurids Brachylophosaurus, Corythosaurus, and Probrachylophosaurus, the ceratopsians Judiceratops, Lokiceratops, Medusaceratops, and Spiclypeus, and the pachycephalosaurids Colepiocephale and Hanssuesia. Multiple other dubious dinosaurs that were described from Judith River by Leidy or during the Bone Wars, a scientific feud between paleontologists Edward Drinker Cope and Othniel Charles Marsh, include Aublysodon, Ceratops, Deinodon, and Pteropelyx. As a hadrosaurid, Trachodon would have been a large, bipedal/quadrupedal herbivore.

== See also ==
- Timeline of hadrosaur research
- Eotrachodon
