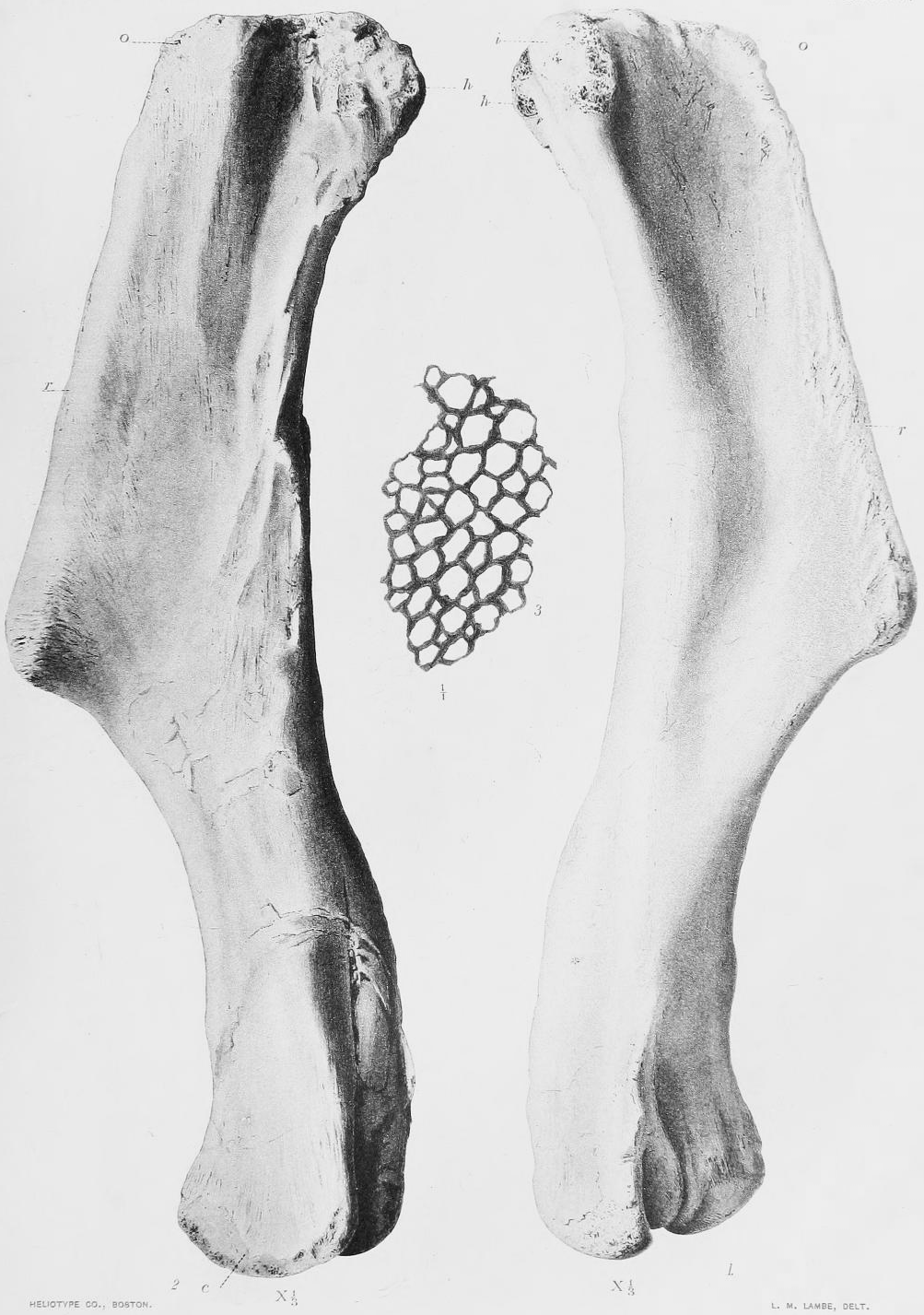
- Humerus and skin impression assigned to Trachodon (Pteropelyx) marginatus

Scientific classification
- Kingdom: Animalia
- Phylum: Chordata
- Class: Reptilia
- Clade: Dinosauria
- Clade: †Ornithischia
- Clade: †Ornithopoda
- Family: †Hadrosauridae
- Genus: †Stephanosaurus; Lambe, 1914

Type species
- †Trachodon marginatus Lambe, 1902

Synonyms
- Trachodon (Pteropelyx) marginatus Lambe,1902

= Stephanosaurus =

Stephanosaurus Temporal range: Late Cretaceous, 76–75 Ma

Extinct genus of dinosaurs

Stephanosaurus is a dubious genus of hadrosaurid dinosaur with a complicated taxonomic history. It has also been known by the names Trachodon marginatus and Kritosaurus marginatus, and some material once assigned to it was later separated into the genus Lambeosaurus.

== Taxonomic history ==
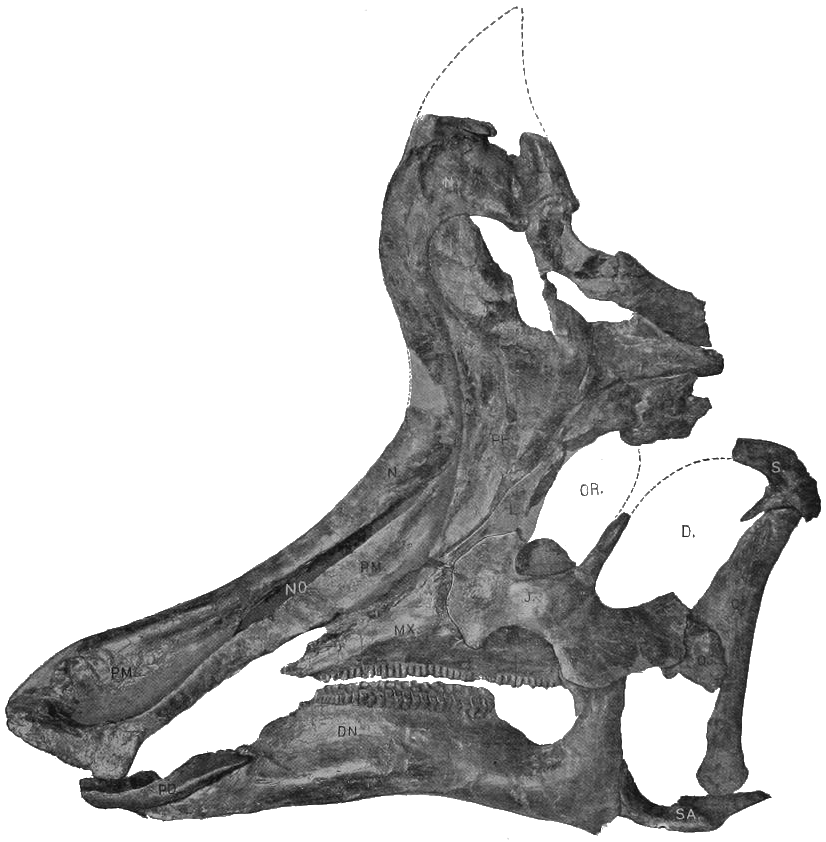
The 1913 Lambeosaurus skull which Lambe referred to Stephanosaurus in 1914

In 1902, Lawrence Lambe named three new species within the hadrosaur genus Trachodon, each assigned to the subgenus Trachodon (Pteropelyx). All were found within the rocks of the Belly River Group in Alberta, Canada. One of these was Trachodon marginatus, based upon what Lambe interpreted as a single individual preserving the humerus, radius, and ulna of the left forelimb, a metatarsal and phalange of a foot, part of a cervical (neck) vertebra, ribs, tooth fragments, broken ossified tendons, and patches of skin impressions. Numerous other disarticulated remains were assigned to the species, including a lower and upper jawbone (the dentary and maxilla bones, respectively). No clear set of distinguishing characteristics was given in Lambe's publication. In 1913 Charles Hazelius Sternberg found more complete hadrosaur material from Belly River, including two partial skulls. Lambe believed these to represented remains of T. marginatus, and based on their distinctive anatomy he elevated the species to the new genus Stephanosaurus, creating the binomial Stephanosaurus marginatus. He stated in this paper that both of the jawbones and the associated individual served as type specimens of S. marginatus, despite his original description attaching the name to the latter with the jawbones only being referred specimens. The name referred to the large crest upon the 1913 skulls, formed by the Greek stephane word meaning "crown". In 1917 another "Stephanosaurus" skull was discovered, even better preserved than those from 1914, noted by Lambe in a study published in 1920. Also in this paper he established the subfamily Stephanosaurinae to contain the hadrosaurs with hollow crests, as they had previously been classified alongside the solid-crested genus Saurolophus in Saurolophinae.

In a later 1914 paper, Barnum Brown criticized Lambe's referral of his new skulls to Stephanosaurus. He saw no reason to assume they belonged to the same species as Lambe's original "Trachodon marginatus" material and noted that it would have been preferable that Lambe had attached the name Stephanosaurus to the new material, with its relationship to T. marginatus evaluated at a later date. In the same paper he established Corythosaurus for a complete skeleton he had found in 1912, and he considered it likely Lambe's skulls belonged to that genus. He also noted that Lambe's reference to the jaws as type specimens was incorrect, and that the validity of T. marginatus must therefore be evaluated based on the associated individual rather than the jaws. Brown considered the validity of T. marginatus, separate from the skulls, unsettled, but he considered it similar to other skeletons then referred to Trachodon and thus advocated maintaining its original name. William Parks would echo Brown's sentiments in a 1923 paper, reinforcing that it had not been demonstrated that the original material and the later skulls belonged to the same species. Though regretting that the name Stephanosaurus could not continue to be used for the skulls, as Lambe (who had died in 1919) had intended, he did not consider it nomenclaturally responsible to overlook the error. Instead, he established the new genus and species Lambeosaurus lambei based upon the skulls, with the name intending to give as much credit as possible to Lambe for the discovery. Likewise, he renamed the Stephanosaurinae to Lambeosaurinae.

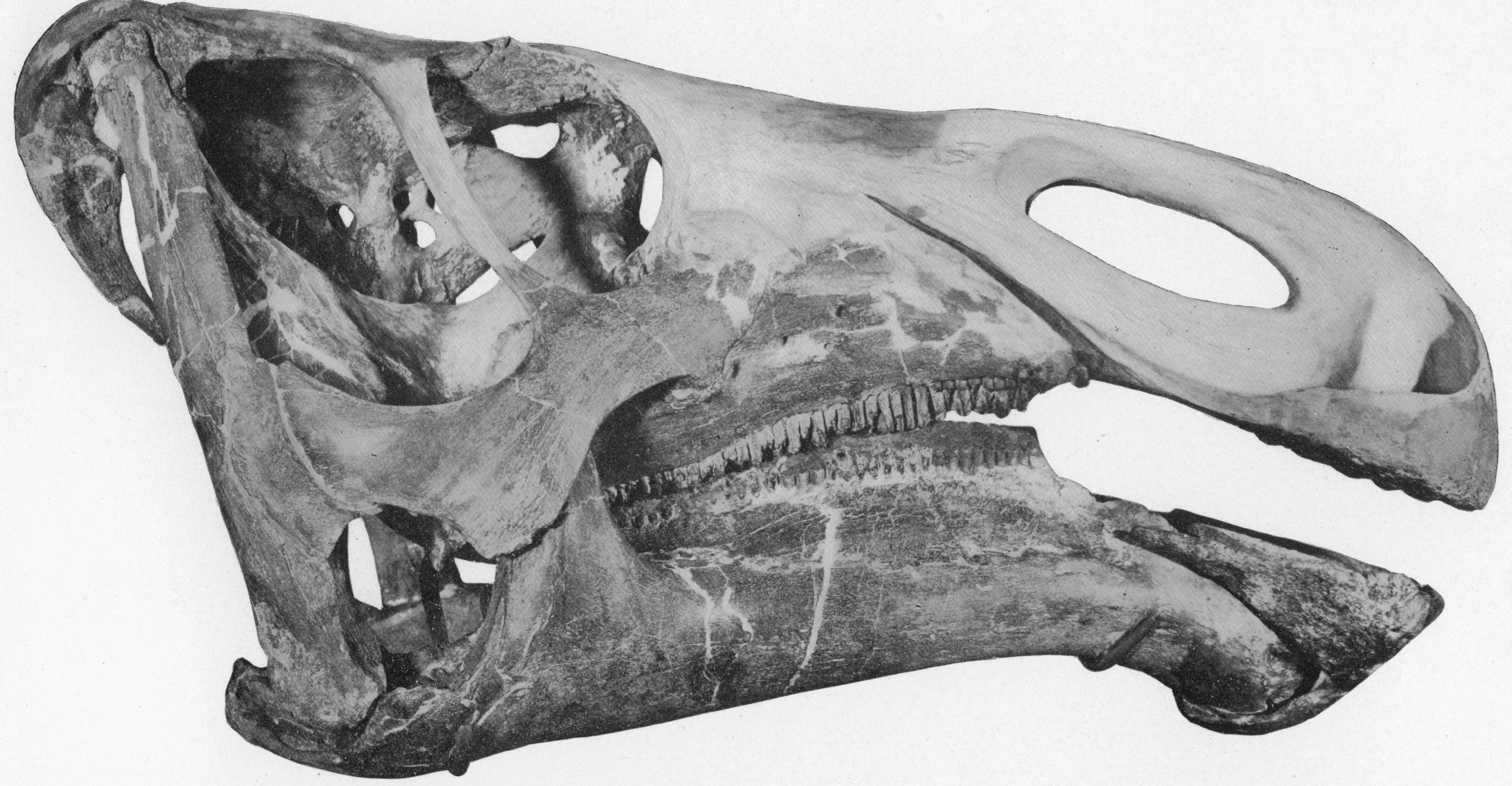
Reconstructed partial skull of Kritosaurus, the genus Gilmore considered Stephanosaurus synonymous with

Charles W. Gilmore, in a 1924 study, performed a direct comparison of the original Stephanosaurus material with the Lambeosaurus skulls in order to resolve their relationship. Gilmore worked in parallel to Parks, only learning of his work shortly before publication. As Parks had merely worked off of published material, rathe rthan Gilmore's firsthand reexamination of the Stephanosaurus material, he still considered his work worth publishing. Based on the proportions of the limbs, with the humerus being longer than the radius, Gilmore concluded the associated individual represented an uncrested hadrosaurine rather than being a lambeosaurine. The upper jawbone, as well, was not lambeosaurine, and Gilmore instead referred it to the genus Kritosaurus. The lower jawbone he noted belonged to a separate individual from the upper, and misrepresented in several details by Lambe in his drawing. Upon examining the specimen firsthand, several anatomical distinctions were obvious between it and the skulls of Lambeosaurus. Thus, none of the material of Stephanosaurus represented the same species as Lambeosaurus. Regarding the true identity of the species, he considered the limb bones of the associated individual to be indistinguishable from Kritosaurus (which Gilmore considered the same as Gryposaurus). As Kritosaurus was named in 1910, four years prior to Stephanosaurus, the latter name was considered a junior synonym. While the species T. marginatus predates all species of Kritosaurus, he could not definitively assign it to any species and maintained it as the distinct Kritosaurus marginatus. In their 1942 monograph Hadrosaurian Dinosaurs of North America, Richard Swann Lull and Nelda Wright tentatively maintained Gilmore's assignment of T. marginatus to Kritosaurus, noting no further developments had come to light in the time since. Later reviews of hadrosaur taxonomy would consider T. marginatus to be dubious, too poor to assign to any known species.

== See also ==
- Timeline of hadrosaur research
