= Mount Lambe =

Mountain in the country of Canada

- Location within Alberta Location within British Columbia Location within Canada

Highest point
- Elevation: 3,182 m (10,440 ft)
- Prominence: 263 m (863 ft)
- Parent peak: Solitaire Mountain (3300 m)
- Listing: Mountains of Alberta; Mountains of British Columbia
- Coordinates: 51°44′14″N 116°49′16″W

Geography
- Country: Canada
- Provinces: Alberta and British Columbia
- Protected area: Banff National Park
- Parent range: Park Ranges
- Topo map: NTS 82N10 Blaeberry River

Climbing
- First ascent: 1918 Interprovincial Boundary Commission

Mount Lambe is a 3,182-metre (10,440-foot) mountain summit located in the Canadian Rockies on the border of Alberta and British Columbia. It was named in 1918 after Lawrence Morris Lambe, a Canadian geologist, palaeontologist, and ecologist from the Geological Survey of Canada.

== Geology ==
Mount Lambe is composed of sedimentary rock laid down during the Precambrian to Cambrian periods and pushed east and over the top of younger rock during the Laramide orogeny.

== Climate ==
Based on the Köppen climate classification, Mount Lambe is located in a subarctic climate with cold, snowy winters, and mild summers. Temperatures can drop below −20 °C with wind chill factors below −30 °C.

== See also ==
- List of mountains in the Canadian Rockies
- List of peaks on the British Columbia–Alberta border
