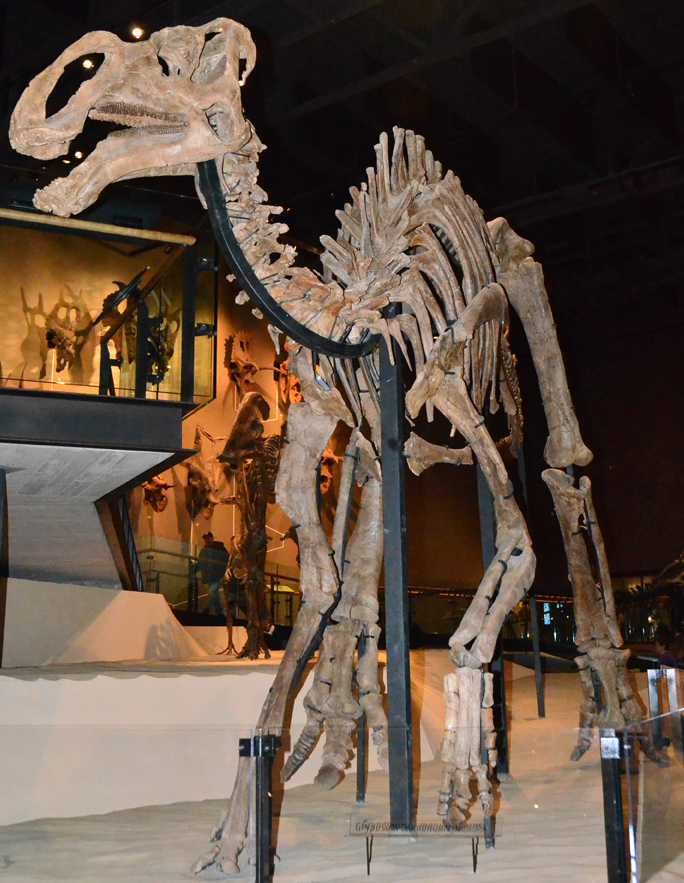
- G. monumentensis skeleton in the Natural History Museum of Utah

Scientific classification
- Kingdom: Animalia
- Phylum: Chordata
- Class: Reptilia
- Clade: Dinosauria
- Clade: †Ornithischia
- Clade: †Ornithopoda
- Family: †Hadrosauridae
- Subfamily: †Saurolophinae
- Tribe: †Kritosaurini
- Genus: †Gryposaurus

Type species
- †Gryposaurus notabilis Lambe, 1914

Species
- †G. notabilis Lambe, 1914; †G. latidens Horner, 1992; †G. monumentensis Gates & Sampson, 2007; †G. alsatei? Lehman, Wick, Wagner, 2016

Synonyms
- Hadrosauravus (nomen nudum) Lambert, 1990

= Gryposaurus =

Gryposaurus Temporal range: Late Cretaceous, 80–75 Ma

Extinct genus of reptiles

Gryposaurus (meaning "hooked-nosed (Greek grypos) lizard"; sometimes incorrectly translated as "griffin (Latin gryphus) lizard") was a genus of duckbilled dinosaur that lived about 80 to 75 million years ago, in the Late Cretaceous (late Santonian to late Campanian stages) of North America. Named species of Gryposaurus are known from the Dinosaur Park Formation in Alberta, Canada, and two formations in the United States: the Lower Two Medicine Formation in Montana and the Kaiparowits Formation of Utah. A possible additional species from the Javelina Formation in Texas may extend the temporal range of the genus to 66 million years ago.

Gryposaurus is similar to Kritosaurus, and for many years the two were thought to be synonyms. It is known from numerous skulls, some skeletons, and even some skin impressions that show it to have had pyramidal scales projecting along the midline of the back. It is most easily distinguished from other duckbills by its narrow arching nasal hump, sometimes described as similar to a "Roman nose," and which may have been used for species or sexual identification, and/or combat with individuals of the same species. A large bipedal/quadrupedal herbivore around 8 meters (26 feet) long, it may have preferred river settings.

== History of discovery ==
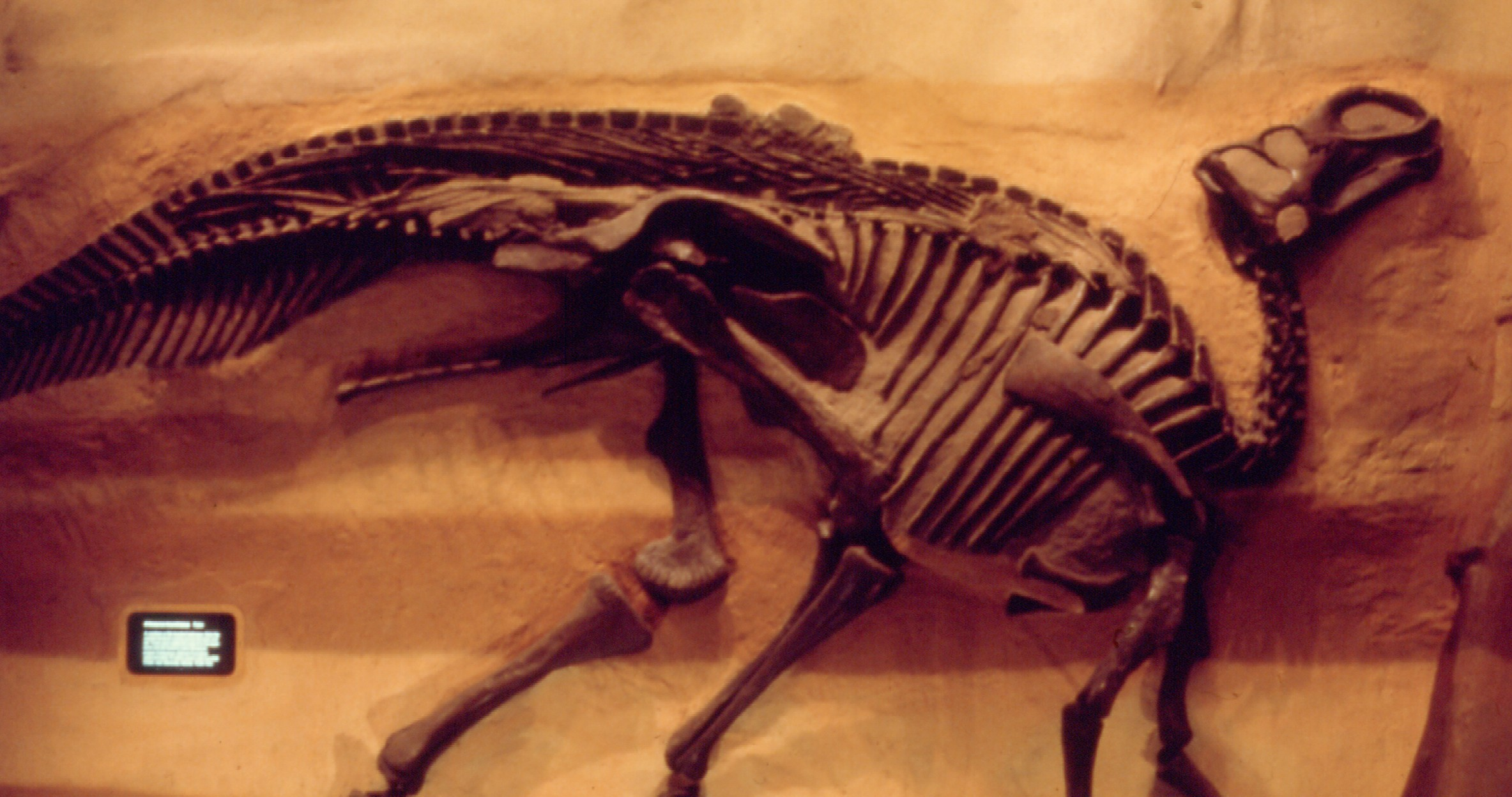
G. notabilis (formerly G. incurvimanus), collected 1918

Gryposaurus is based on specimen NMC 2278, a skull and partial skeleton collected in 1913 by George F. Sternberg from what is now known as the Dinosaur Park Formation of Alberta, along the Red Deer River. This specimen was described and named by Lawrence Lambe shortly thereafter, Lambe drawing attention to its unusual nasal crest. A few years earlier, Barnum Brown had collected and described a partial skull from New Mexico, which he named Kritosaurus. This skull was missing the snout, which had eroded into fragments; Brown restored it after the duckbill now known as Edmontosaurus annectens, which was flat-headed, and believed that some unusual pieces were evidence of compression. Lambe's description of Gryposaurus provided evidence of a different type of skull configuration, and by 1916 the Kritosaurus skull had been redone with a nasal arch and both Brown and Charles Gilmore had proposed that Gryposaurus and Kritosaurus were one and the same. This idea was reflected in William Parks's naming of a nearly complete skeleton from the Dinosaur Park Formation as Kritosaurus incurvimanus, not Gryposaurus incurvimanus (although he left Gryposaurus notabilis in its own genus). Direct comparison between Kritosaurus incurvimanus and Gryposaurus notabilis is hindered by the fact that the incurvimanus type specimen is missing the front part of the skull, so the full shape of the nasal arch cannot be seen. The 1942 publication of the influential Lull and Wright monograph on hadrosaurs sealed the Kritosaurus/Gryposaurus question for nearly fifty years in favor of Kritosaurus. Reviews beginning in the 1990s, however, called into question the identity of Kritosaurus navajovius, which has limited material for comparison with other duckbills. Thus, Gryposaurus has once again been separated, at least temporarily, from Kritosaurus.

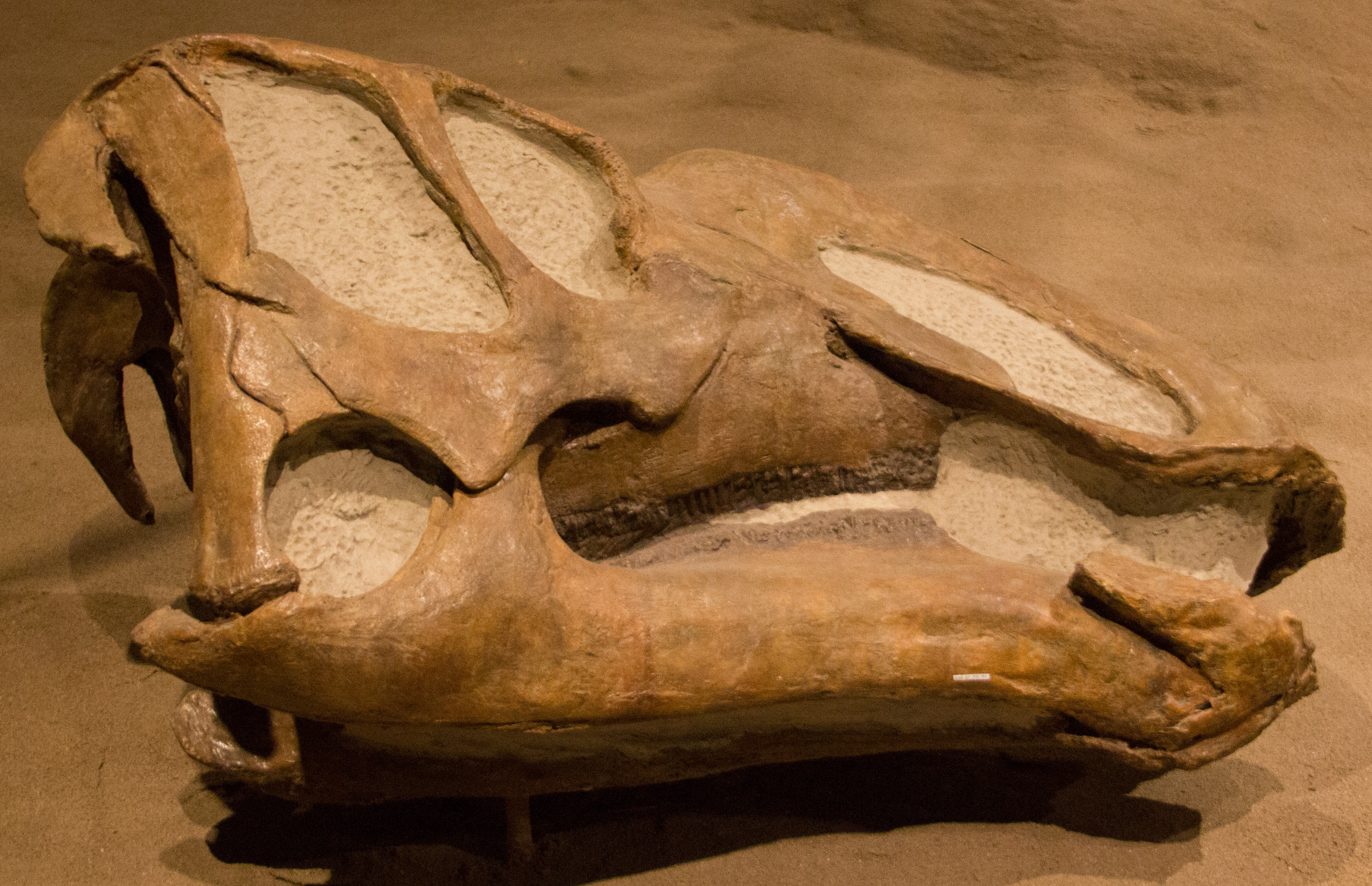
Skull, Royal Tyrrell Museum

This situation is made more confusing by old suggestions by some authors, including Jack Horner, that Hadrosaurus is also the same as either Gryposaurus, Kritosaurus, or both. This hypothesis was most common in the late 1970s–early 1980s, and appears in some popular books; one well-known work, The Illustrated Encyclopedia of Dinosaurs, uses Kritosaurus for the Canadian material (Gryposaurus), but identifies the mounted skeleton of K. incurvimanus as Hadrosaurus in a photo caption. Although Horner in 1979 used the new combination Hadrosaurus [Kritosaurus] notabilis for a partial skull and skeleton and a second less-complete skeleton from the Bearpaw Shale of Montana (which have since fallen out of the literature), by 1990 he had changed his position, and was among the first to again use Gryposaurus in print. Current thought is that Hadrosaurus, although known from fragmentary material, can be distinguished from Gryposaurus by differences in the upper arm and ilium.

Further research has revealed the presence of a second species, G. latidens, from slightly older rocks in Montana than the classic gryposaur localities of Alberta. Based on two parts of a skeleton collected in 1916 for the American Museum of Natural History, G. latidens is also known from bonebed material. Horner, who described the specimens, considered it to be a less derived species.

New material from the Kaiparowits Formation of Utah, in Grand Staircase–Escalante National Monument, includes a skull and partial skeleton that represent the species G. monumentensis. Its skull was more robust than that of the other species, and its predentary had enlarged prongs along its upper margin, where the lower jaw's beak was based. This new species greatly expands the geographic range of this genus, and there may be a second, more lightly built species present as well. Multiple gryposaur species are known from the Kaiparowits Formation, represented by cranial and postcranial remains, and were larger than their northern counterparts.

In Texas, specifically at the Javelina Formation and the El Picacho Formation, indeterminate hadrosaur remains resembling Kritosaurus and Gryposaurus have been unearthed for decades, but none were considered to be identifiable as a determined genus of hadrosaur, but do resemble some species of Kritosaurini or at least some species of Kritosaurus. However, in 2016, a possibly forth valid species of Gryposaurus named G. alsatei, which was named after Alsate, who was the last leader of the Mescalero Apaches, was unearthed in the Javelina Formation in Texas. Further research is needed to confirm its validity.

=== Species ===
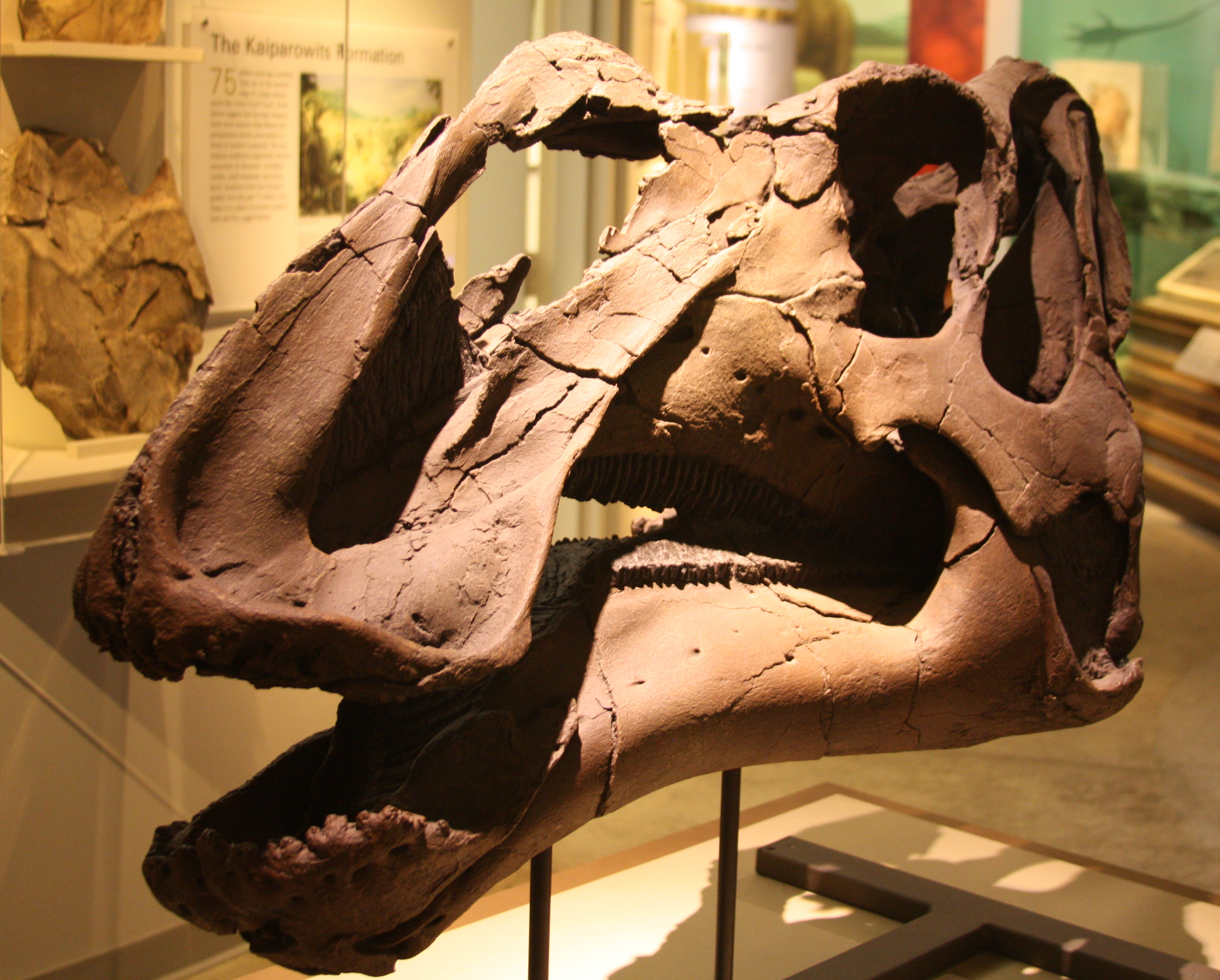
G. monumentensis skull

As of 2016, there are currently three named species that are recognized as valid today: G. notabilis, G. latidens, and G. monumentensis. The type species G. notabilis is from the late Campanian-age Upper Cretaceous Dinosaur Park Formation of Alberta, Canada. It is now thought that another species from the same formation, Kritosaurus incurvimanus (also known as Gryposaurus incurvimanus), is a synonym of G. notabilis. The two had been differentiated by the size of the nasal arch (larger and closer to the eyes in G. notabilis) and the form of the upper arm (longer and more robust in K. incurvimanus). Ten complete skulls and twelve fragmentary skulls are known for G. notabilis along with postcrania, as well as with two skeletons with skulls that had been assigned to K. incurvimanus. G. latidens, from the late Santonian-early Campanian Lower Two Medicine Formation of Pondera County, Montana, USA, is known from partial skulls and skeletons from several individuals. Its nasal arch is prominent like that of G. notabilis, but farther forward on the snout, and its teeth are less derived, reflecting iguanodont-like characteristics. The informal name "Hadrosauravus" is an early, unused name for this species. G. monumentensis is known from a skull and partial skeleton from Utah. G. monumentensis was listed second on the top 10 list of new species in 2008 by the International Institute for Species Exploration. Recently, a possible fourth species of Gryposaurus, Gryposaurus alsatei, was unearthed in the Javelina Formation, which dates to the late Maastrichtian, along with an unnamed species of Kritosaurus and an undescribed saurolophine which closely resembles Saurolophus, but with a more solid crest. Fossil remains of Gryposaurus have also been unearthed in the El Picacho Formation in Texas.

The dubious hadrosaurid Stephanosaurus marginatus was considered a possible species of Kritosaurus, following the synonymy of Gryposaurus with Kritosaurus. However, this synonymy was rejected in the 2004 edition of the Dinosauria, with Stephanosaurus being tabulated as dubious.

== Description ==
Size comparison of three species of Gryposaurus

Gryposaurus was a hadrosaurid of typical size and shape; one of the best specimens of this genus, the nearly complete type specimen of Kritosaurus incurvimanus (now regarded as a synonym of Gryposaurus notabilis) came from an animal about 8.2 meters (27 feet) long. This specimen also has the best example of skin impressions for Gryposaurus, showing this dinosaur to have had several different types of scalation: pyramidal, ridged, limpet-shaped feature scales forming scutes upwards of 3.8 centimeters long (1.5 inches) on the flank and tail; uniform polygonal basement scales on the neck and sides of the body; and pyramidal structures, flattened side-to-side, with fluted sides, longer than tall and found along the top of the back in a single midline row. In 2016, Gregory S. Paul estimated the size of G. latidens at 7.5 metres (25 ft) in length and 2.5 metric tons (2.8 short tons) in body mass and the other two species (G. notabilis and G. monumentensis) at 8 metres (26 ft) in length and 3 metric tons (3.3 short tons) in body mass.

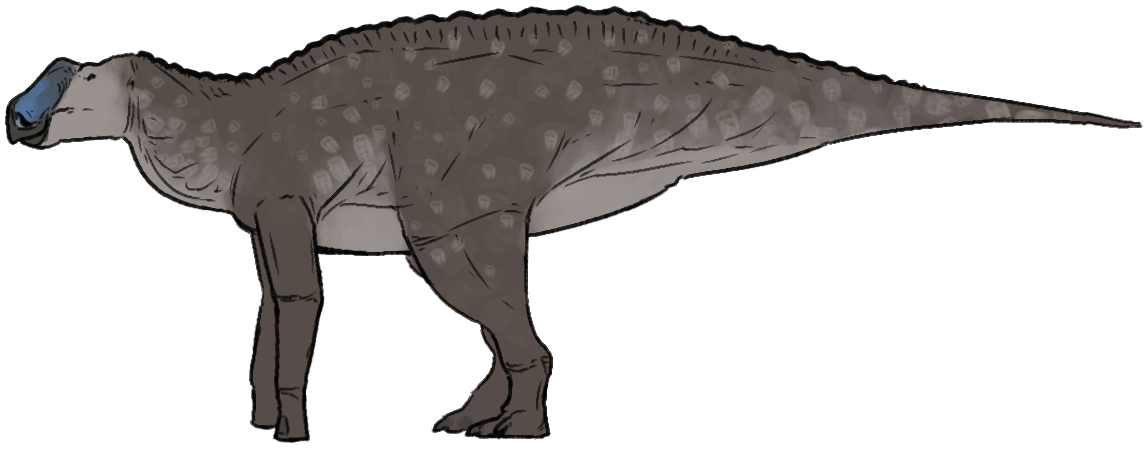
G. notabilis life restoration

The three named species of Gryposaurus differ in details of the skull and lower jaw. The prominent nasal arch found in this genus is formed from the paired nasal bones. In profile view, they rise into a rounded hump in front of the eyes, reaching a height as tall as the highest point of the back of the skull. The skeleton is known in great detail, making it a useful point of reference for other duckbill skeletons.

== Classification ==
Gryposaurus was a saurolophine (hadrosaurine of older references) hadrosaurid, a member of the duckbill subfamily without hollow head crests. The general term "gryposaur" is sometimes used for duckbills with arched nasals. Tethyshadros was once thought to fall into this group as well, before it was described (then known under the nickname "Antonio"). A subfamily, Gryposaurinae, was coined by Jack Horner as part of a larger revision that promoted Hadrosaurinae to family status, but is not now in use. A rough equivalent is Kritosaurini, as used by Alberto Prieto-Márquez. Kritosaurus has been proposed to be a synonym of Gryposaurus, but it is slightly younger. Additionally, while the skull of Kritosaurus is incompletely known, lacking most of the bones in front of the eyes, it was very similar to that of Gryposaurus.

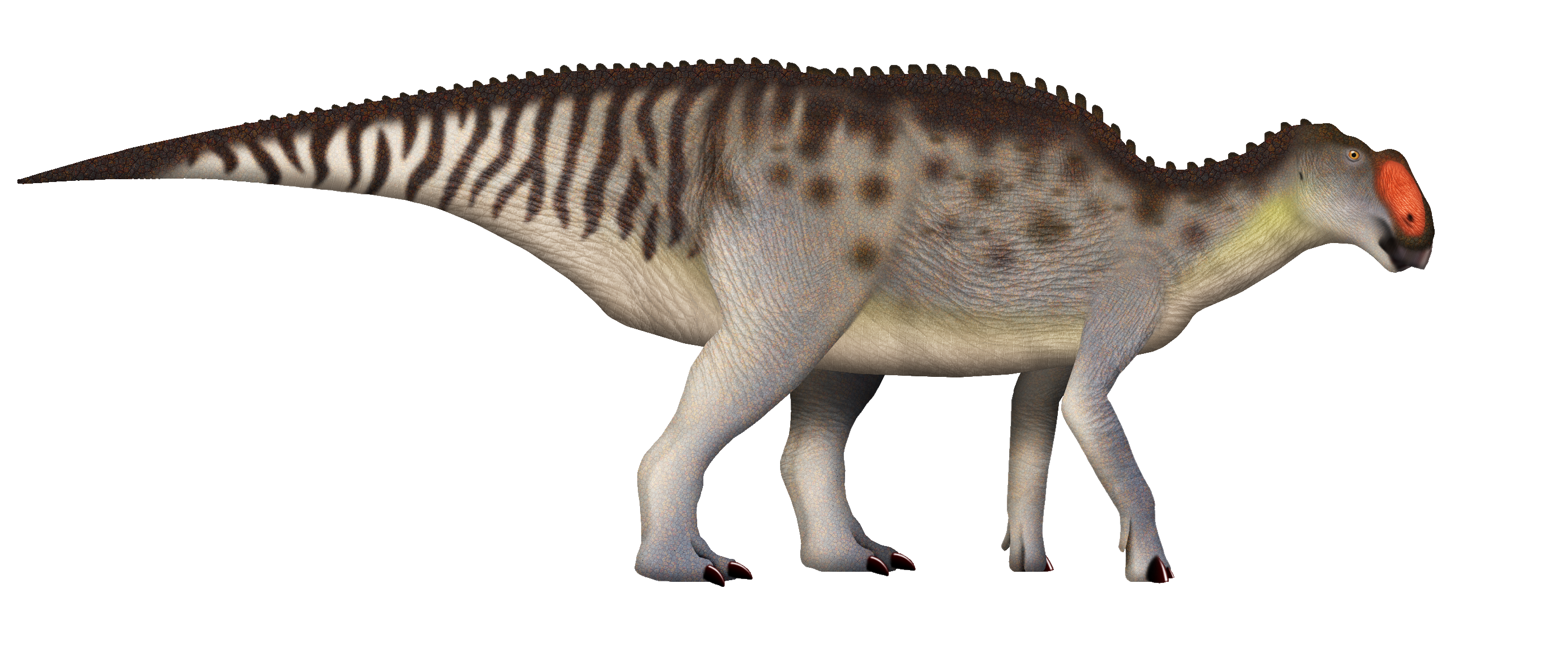
G.monumentensis restoration

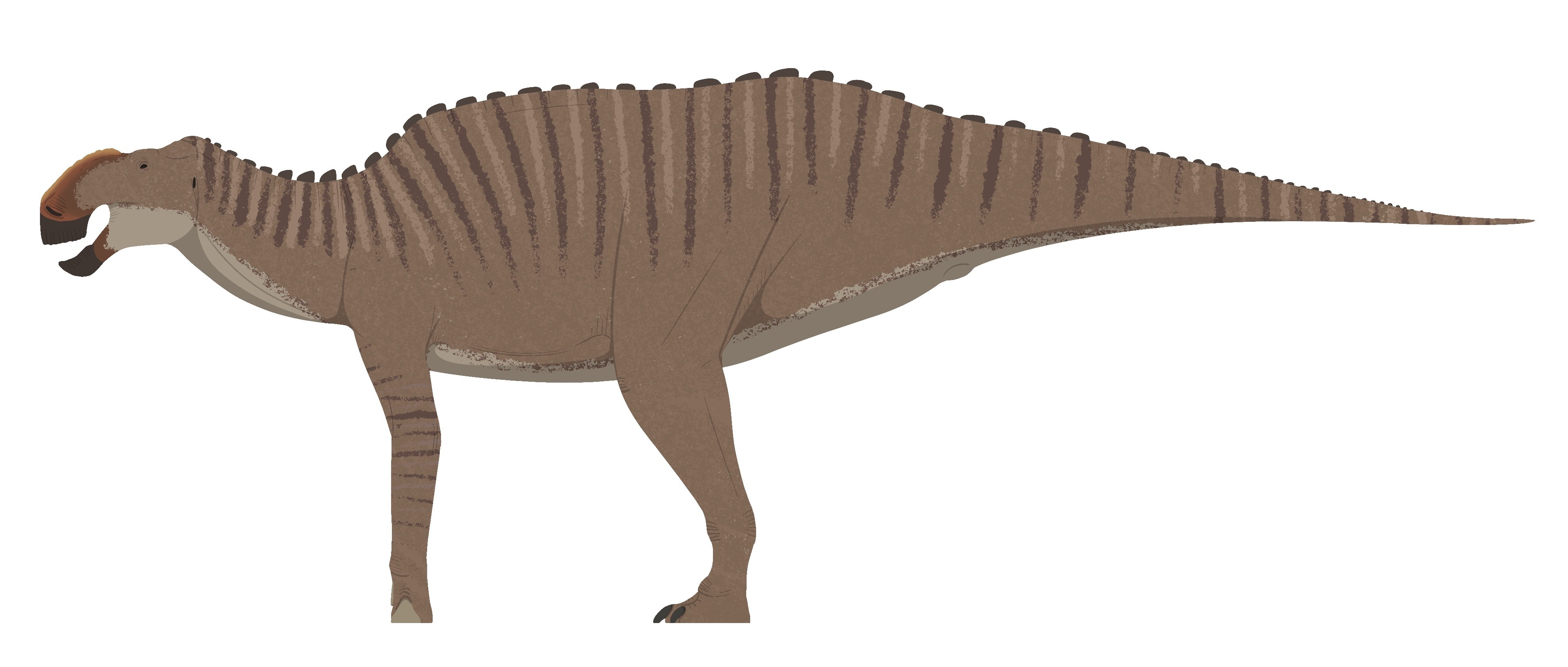
G. alsatei restoration

The following is a cladogram based on the phylogenetic analysis conducted by Prieto-Márquez and Wagner in 2012, showing the relationships of Gryposaurus among the other kritosaurins:

- Kritosaurini
  - Wulagasaurus
  - - Kritosaurus
    - - - Gryposaurus latidens
        - - Gryposaurus notabilis
          - Gryposaurus monumentensis
      - - Aquilarhinus
        - - Secernosaurus
          - Willinakaqe

== Paleobiology ==
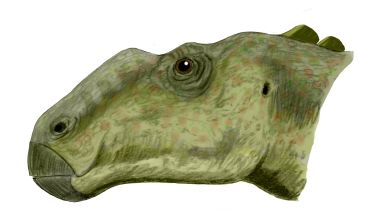
Restored head of G. notabilis.

As a hadrosaurid, Gryposaurus would have been a bipedal/quadrupedal herbivore, eating a variety of plants. Its skull had special joints that permitted a grinding motion analogous to chewing, and its teeth were continually replacing and packed into dental batteries that contained hundreds of teeth, only a relative handful of which were in use at any time. Plant material would have been cropped by its broad beak, and held in the jaws by a cheek-like organ. Its feeding range would have extended from the ground to about 4 m (13 ft) above. The paleontologists who unearthed G. monumentensis back in the 2000s brought the fact that this creature dined on tough, fibrous plant material which would imply that Gryposaurs was both a grazer and a browser. The dental microwear of a specimen of Gryposaurus sp. from the Kaiparowits Formation was unusually smooth; this smoothness can be interpreted as evidence of this individual feeding on conifers, ferns, and cycads rather than angiosperms, feeding on which is typically more likely to result in significant tooth abrasion. However, because only one specimen had dental microwear texture analysis performed on it, this may not reflect the overall feeding patterns of this taxon.

Like other bird-hipped dinosaurs of the Dinosaur Park Formation, Gryposaurus appears to have only existed for part of the duration of time that the rocks were being formed. As the formation was being laid down, it recorded a change to more marine-influenced conditions. Gryposaurus is absent from the upper part of the formation, with Prosaurolophus present instead. Other dinosaurs known from only the lower part of the formation include the horned Centrosaurus and the hollow-crested duckbill Corythosaurus. Gryposaurus may have preferred river-related settings.

=== Nasal arch ===
The distinctive nasal arch of Gryposaurus, like other cranial modifications in duckbills, may have been used for a variety of social functions, such as identification of sexes or species and social ranking. It could also have functioned as a tool for broadside pushing or butting in social contests, and there may have been inflatable air sacs flanking it for both visual and auditory signaling. The top of the arch is roughened in some specimens, suggesting that it was covered by thick, keratinized skin, or that there was a cartilaginous extension.

== Paleoecology ==
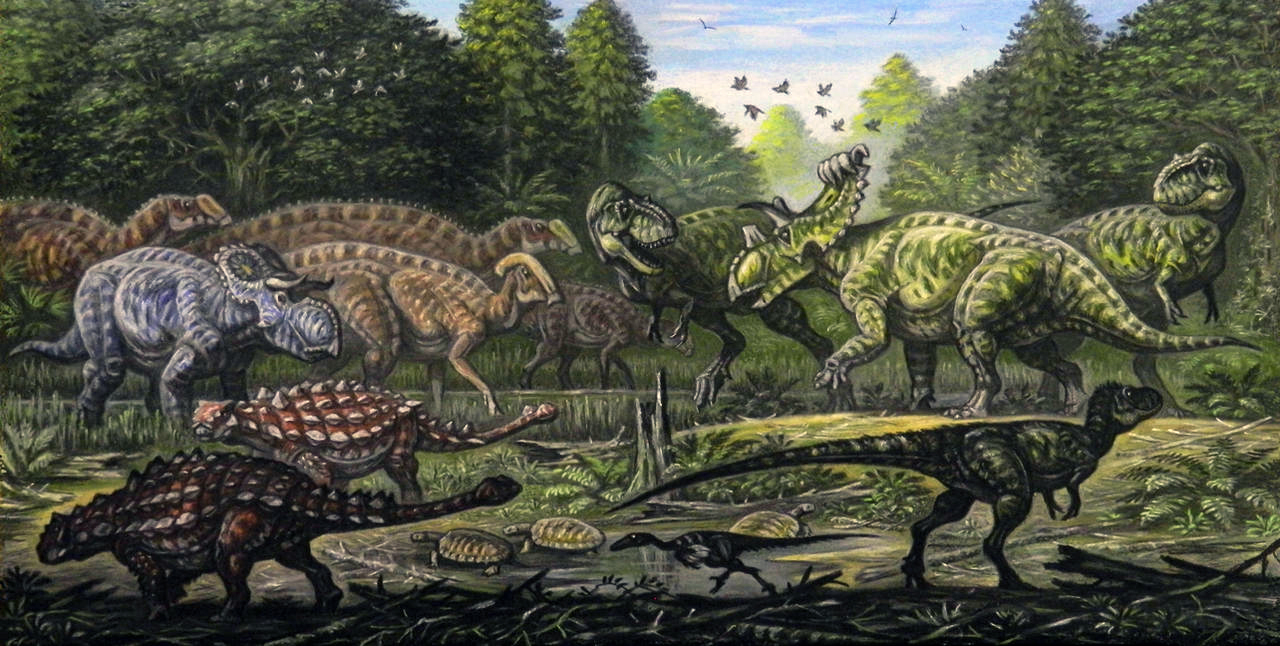
Restoration of G. monumentensis (left background) and other animals of the Kaiparowits Formation

=== Utah ===
Argon-argon radiometric dating indicates that the Kaiparowits Formation was deposited between 76.1 and 74.0 million years ago, during the Campanian stage of the Late Cretaceous period. During the Late Cretaceous period, the site of the Kaiparowits Formation was located near the western shore of the Western Interior Seaway, a large inland sea that split North America into two landmasses, Laramidia to the west and Appalachia to the east. The plateau where dinosaurs lived was an ancient floodplain dominated by large channels and abundant wetland peat swamps, ponds and lakes, and was bordered by highlands. The climate was wet and humid, and supported an abundant and diverse range of organisms. This formation contains one of the best and most continuous records of Late Cretaceous terrestrial life in the world.

Gryposaurus monumentensis shared its paleoenvironment with other dinosaurs, such as dromaeosaurid theropods, the troodontid Talos sampsoni, ornithomimids like Ornithomimus velox, tyrannosaurids like Albertosaurus and Teratophoneus, armored ankylosaurids, the duckbilled hadrosaur Parasaurolophus cyrtocristatus, the ceratopsians Utahceratops gettyi, Nasutoceratops titusi and Kosmoceratops richardsoni and the oviraptorosaurian Hagryphus giganteus. Other paleofauna present in the Kaiparowits Formation included chondrichthyans (sharks and rays), frogs, salamanders, turtles, lizards and crocodilians. A variety of early mammals were present including multituberculates, marsupials, and insectivorans.

== See also ==
- Timeline of hadrosaur research
- 2016 in paleontology
