= Pteropelyx =

Pteropelyx Temporal range: Late Cretaceous, 75 Ma

Scientific classification
- Domain: Eukaryota
- Kingdom: Animalia
- Phylum: Chordata
- Clade: Dinosauria
- Clade: †Ornithischia
- Clade: †Ornithopoda
- Family: †Hadrosauridae
- Subfamily: †Lambeosaurinae
- Genus: †Pteropelyx; Cope, 1889

Type species
- †Pteropelyx grallipes Cope, 1889

Extinct genus of dinosaurs

Pteropelyx (meaning "winged pelvis") is a dubious genus of Late Cretaceous hadrosaurid dinosaur from the Judith River Formation of Montana, named by Edward Drinker Cope in 1889. Historically, several species were assigned to it, all based on extremely fragmentary remains, but there is no evidence to support these assignments, making the type species, P. grallipes, the only valid species. Most of these other species' remains likely belong to better-known hadrosaurs, such as Lambeosaurus and Gryposaurus. It is probable that the type material of Pteropelyx, a skeleton lacking a skull, is from Corythosaurus (making Pteropelyx its senior synonym) (Brett-Surman, 1989), but the lack of a skull makes such a synonymy impossible to determine with sure certainty as no certain evidence pertain to prove the organ to be present.

== See also ==
- Timeline of hadrosaur research
