= Lawrence Lambe =

Canadian geologist and paleontologist (1863-1919)

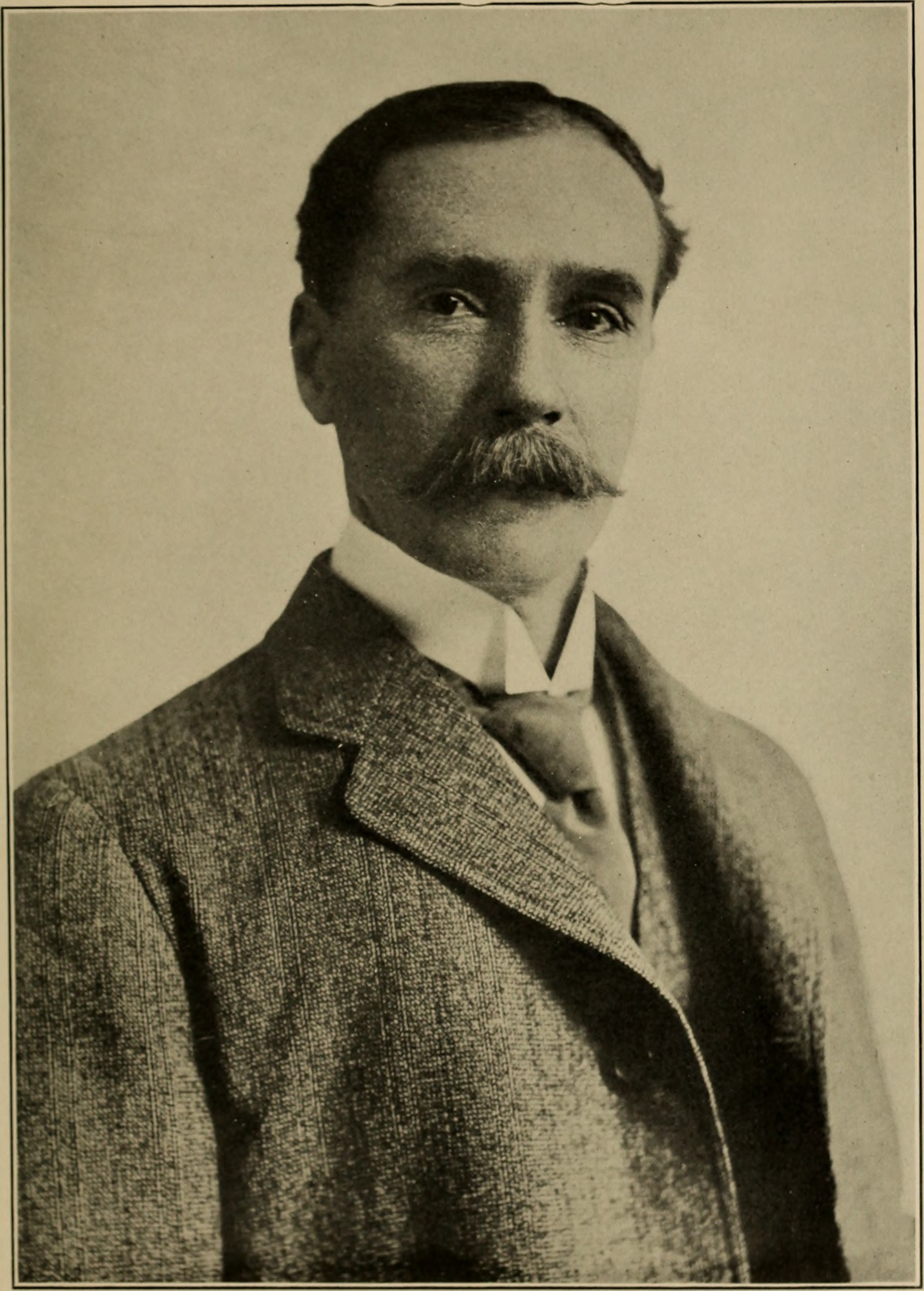
- Born: Lawrence Morris Lambe; August 27, 1863; Montreal, Canada East
- Died: March 12, 1919 (aged 55); Ottawa, Canada
- Scientific career
- Fields: Geology, palaeontology, ecology

Lawrence Morris Lambe (August 27, 1863 – March 12, 1919) was a Canadian geologist, palaeontologist, and ecologist from the Geological Survey of Canada (GSC). His published work, describing the diverse and plentiful dinosaur discoveries from the fossil beds in Alberta, did much to bring dinosaurs into the public eye and helped usher in the Golden Age of Dinosaurs in the province. During this period, between the 1880s and World War I, dinosaur hunters from all over the world converged on Alberta. Lambeosaurus, a well-known hadrosaur, was named after him as a tribute, in 1923. In addition to paleontology, Lambe discovered a number of invertebrate species ranging from Canada to the Pacific Northwest. Lambe's contemporary discoveries were published in works such as Sponges From the Atlantic Coast of Canada and Catalogue of the recent marine sponges of Canada and Alaska.

== Early life and education ==
Lambe was born in Montreal on August 27, 1863. Lambe studied at the Royal Military College of Canada in Kingston, Ontario from 1880–1883.

== Career ==
Lambe published a number of biological works, starting in the 1880s and culminating in 1919. His most notable published works from his biological and zoological studies include his numerous Bibliography of Canadian Zoology editions, along with Sponges from the western coast of North America, and A new recent marine sponge (Esperella bella-bellensis) from the Pacific Coast of Canada. Lambe's work in western Canada began in 1897. He discovered a number of new dinosaur genera and species over the next few years, and spent much of his time preparing the fossil galleries of the GSC's museum. In 1902, he described Canada's first dinosaur finds, various species of Monoclonius. He described Centrosaurus in 1904. Euoplocephalus was named by him, in 1910. In 1913, he named Styracosaurus. He was responsible for naming Chasmosaurus and Gorgosaurus, in 1914 and Eoceratops in 1915. In 1917, he created the genus Edmontosaurus. In 1919 came Panoplosaurus. He also discovered and named the hadrosaurid Gryposaurus.

Inevitably, it was not only dinosaurs that Lambe discovered. The crocodilian Leidysuchus canadensis was described in 1907. This is the most commonly found crocodilian species found in the Late Cretaceous deposits of Alberta. He also studied fishes from the Triassic of Alberta and the Devonian of New Brunswick, and also Paleozoic corals. He also collected Tertiary insects and plants in British Columbia. However, it is for his work on vertebrates from western Canada, especially dinosaurs, that he is most famous.

He died at his home in Ottawa on March 12, 1919.

== Books ==
- Lawrence Lambe Album of 632 paleontological drawings (1885–1891), From The Logan Collection, Geological Survey of Canada (1891)
- Lawrence Morris Lambe Collected papers eBook - Digitized from 1901 volume
- Lawrence Morris Lambe On Trionyx Foveatus, Lediy, And Trionyx, Vagans, Cope, From The Cretaceous Rocks Of Alberta (1902); published in 2008 by Kessinger Publishing, LLC.
- Lawrence Morris Lambe Sponges From The Western Coast Of North America (1894); published in 2008 by Kessinger Publishing, LLC.
- Lawrence Morris Lambe Presidential address: The past vertebrate life of Canada (1912) by Royal Society of Canada; published in 2008 by Kessinger Publishing, LLC.
- Lawrence Morris Lambe Description of a new species of Platysomus from the neighborhood of Banff, Alta (1914) by Royal Society of Canada; published in 2008 by Kessinger Publishing, LLC.
- Lawrence Morris Lambe On new species of Aspideretes from the Belly River formation of Alberta: With further information regarding the structure of the carapace of Boremys pulchra (1914) published in 2008 by Kessinger Publishing, LLC.

== Honours ==
- Lambe Island, Algoma District, Ontario, Canada was named in honour of Mr. Lawrence M. Lambe (RMC 1880–1883), Invertebrate Palaeontologist, Geological Survey. It is located at 46° 19' 49" North 83° 54' 25" West
- In 1923, the new Hadrosaurian genus Lambeosaurus was also named after Lawrence Lambe.
- Mount Lambe in Banff National Park was named for him in 1918.
