= List of the prehistoric life of Montana =

This list of the prehistoric life of Montana contains the various prehistoric life-forms whose fossilized remains have been reported from within the US state of Montana.

== Precambrian ==
The Paleobiology Database records no known occurrences of Precambrian fossils in Montana.

== Paleozoic ==
=== Selected Paleozoic taxa of Montana ===
- †Achistrum
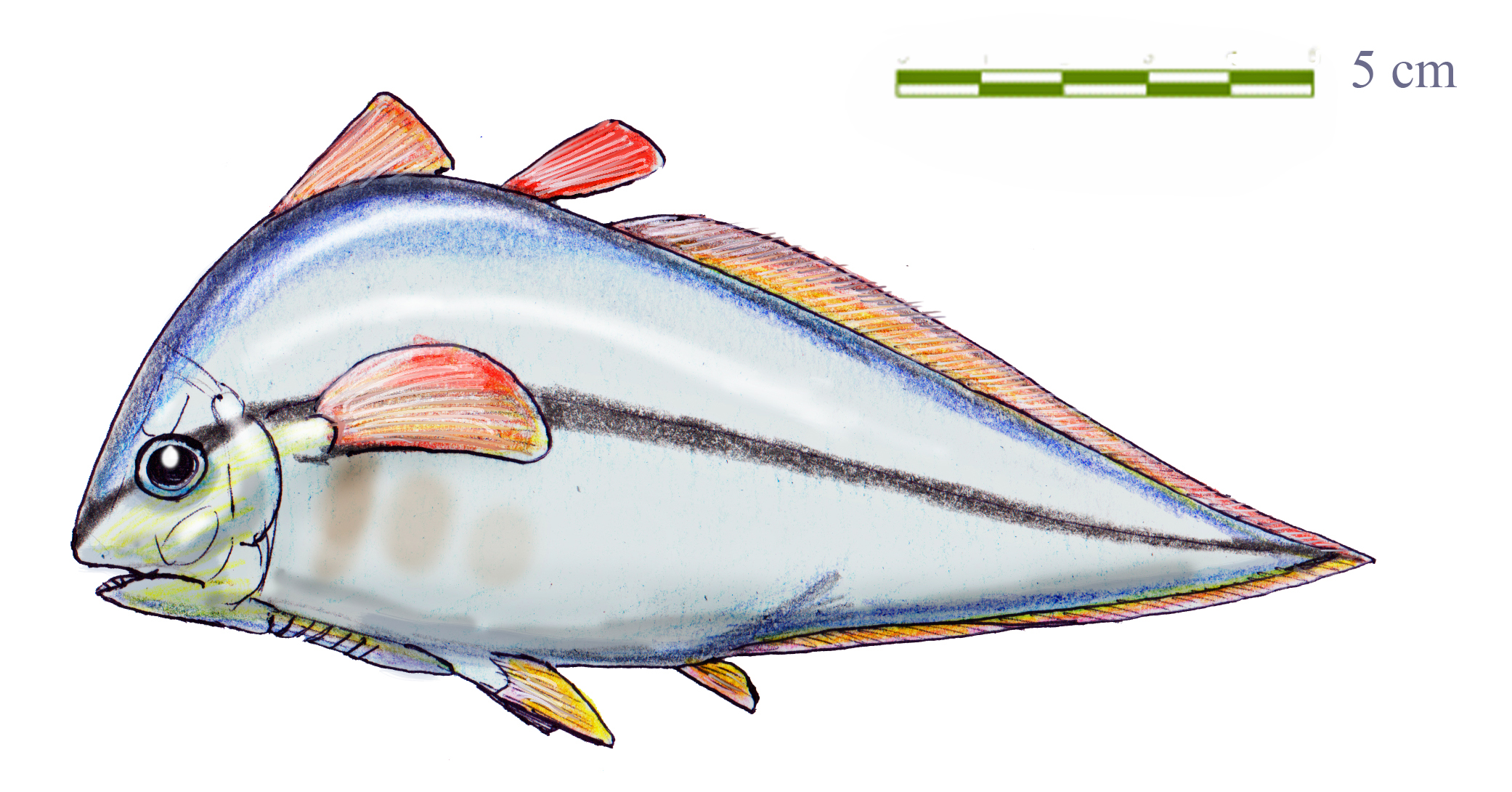
- Life restoration of the Carboniferous lobe-finned fish Allenypterus
  †Allenypterus – type locality for genus
  - †Allenypterus montanus – type locality for species
- Ammodiscus
- †Amphiscapha
- †Amplexus
- †Aphelaeceras
- †Athyris
- †Atrypa
- †Aulopora
- †Aviculopecten
  - †Aviculopecten kaibabensis – or unidentified comparable form
- †Avonia
- †Bathyuriscus
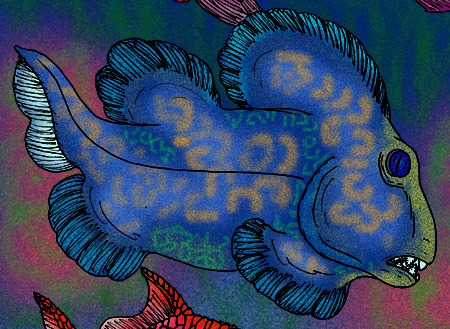
- Restoration of the Carboniferous Chimaera relative Belantsea
  †Belantsea – type locality for genus
  - †Belantsea montana – type locality for species
- †Bellerophon
- †Callograptus
- †Camarotoechia
  - †Camarotoechia contracta
  - †Camarotoechia crenistria
  - †Camarotoechia elegantula
  - †Camarotoechia herrickana – or unidentified related form
  - †Camarotoechia metallica
  - †Camarotoechia mutata
  - †Camarotoechia tuta
- †Caninia
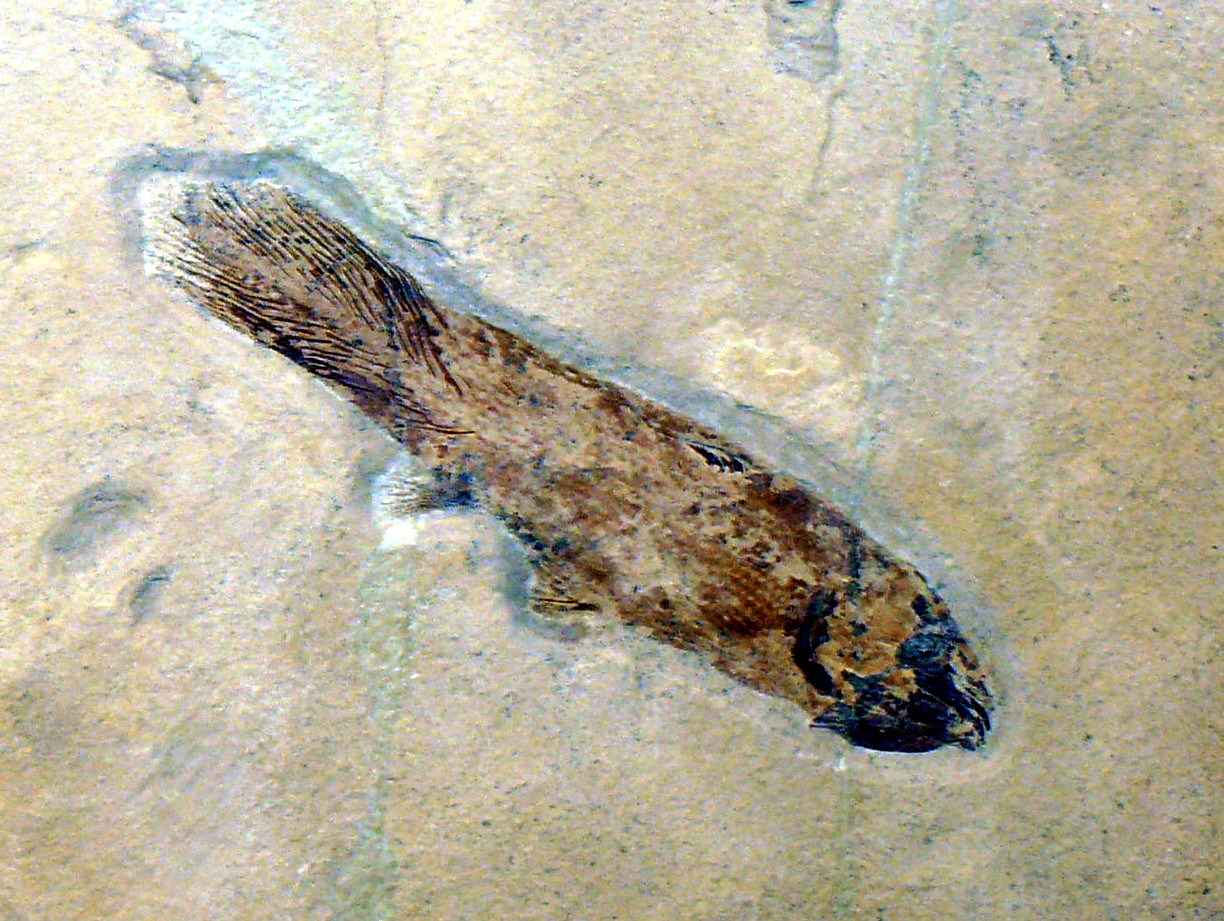
- Fossilized skeleton of the Carboniferous coelacanth Caridosuctor
  †Caridosuctor – type locality for genus
- †Carinoclymenia
- †Cavusgnathus
- †Cheiloceras
- †Chonetes
  - †Chonetes geniculatus
  - †Chonetes loganensis
  - †Chonetes logani
  - †Chonetes ornatus
- †Cladodus
- †Cleiothyridina
  - †Cleiothyridina atrypoides
  - †Cleiothyridina ciriacksi – type locality for species
  - †Cleiothyridina coloradoensis – or unidentified comparable form
  - †Cleiothyridina devonica
  - †Cleiothyridina hirsuta
  - †Cleiothyridina incrassata – or unidentified related form
  - †Cleiothyridina sublamellosa
- †Clonograptus
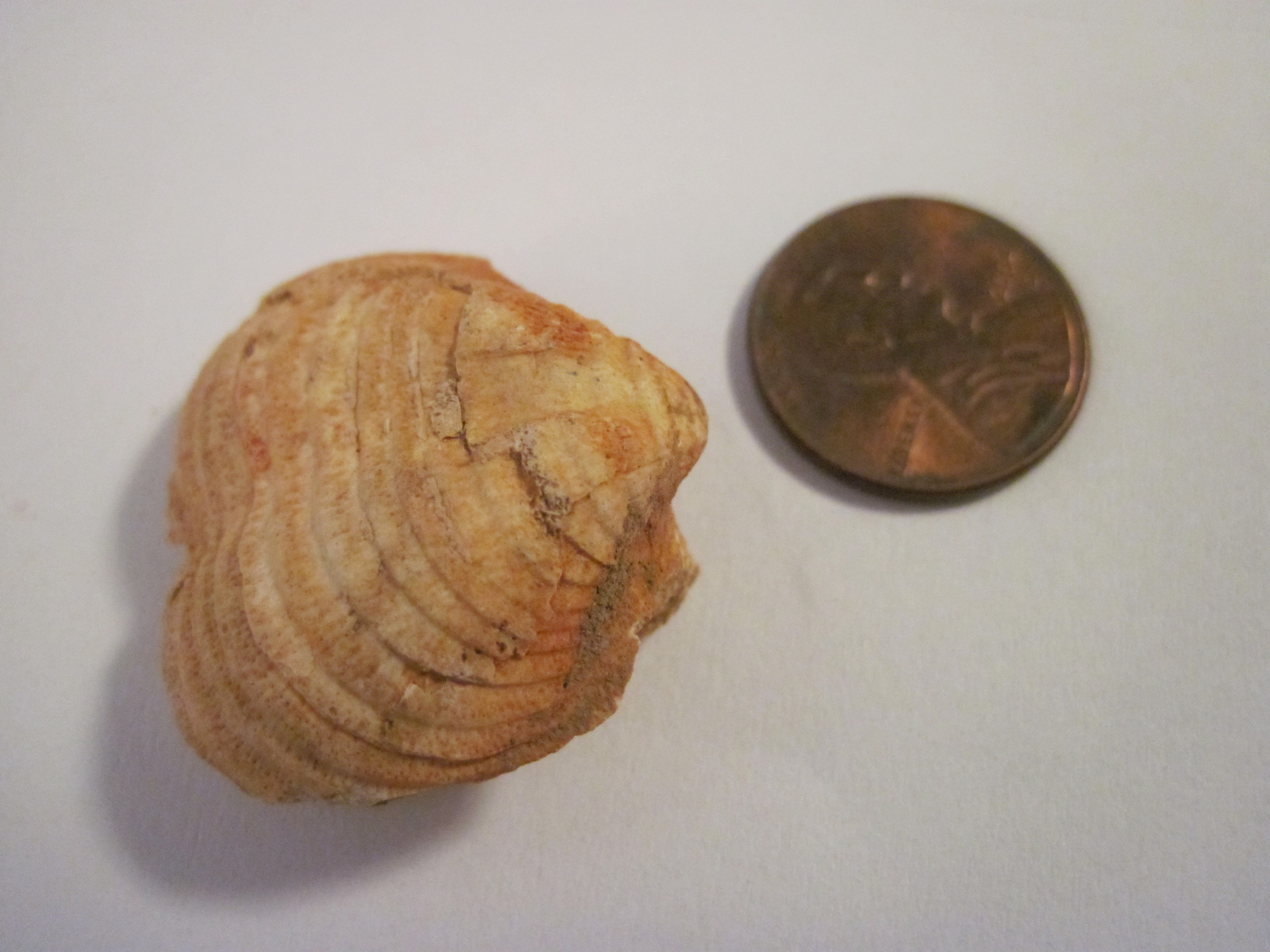
- Fossilized shell of the Late Devonian-Permian brachiopod Composita
  †Composita
  - †Composita humilis
  - †Composita laevis
  - †Composita lateralis – or unidentified comparable form
  - †Composita madisonensis
  - †Composita ovata
  - †Composita ozarkana
  - †Composita sulcata
- †Cornulites
- †Crania
- †Cyranorhis – type locality for genus
- †Cyrtospirifer
  - †Cyrtospirifer animaensis
  - †Cyrtospirifer animasensis – or unidentified comparable form
  - †Cyrtospirifer bertrandi – type locality for species
  - †Cyrtospirifer gallatinensis
  - †Cyrtospirifer hornellensis
  - †Cyrtospirifer monticola
  - †Cyrtospirifer perryi – type locality for species
  - †Cyrtospirifer thalattodoxa – tentative report
  - †Cyrtospirifer whitneyi
- †Cystodictya
- †Damocles – type locality for genus
- †Debeerius – type locality for genus
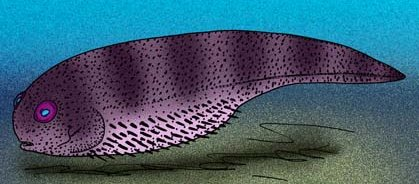
- Life restoration of the Carboniferous Chimaera relative Delphyodontos
  †Delphyodontos – type locality for genus
  - †Delphyodontos dacriformes – type locality for species
- †Dendrograptus
- †Dictyonema
- †Dikelocephalus
- †Distomodus
- †Echinaria
- †Echinochimaera – type locality for genus
  - †Echinochimaera meltoni – type locality for species

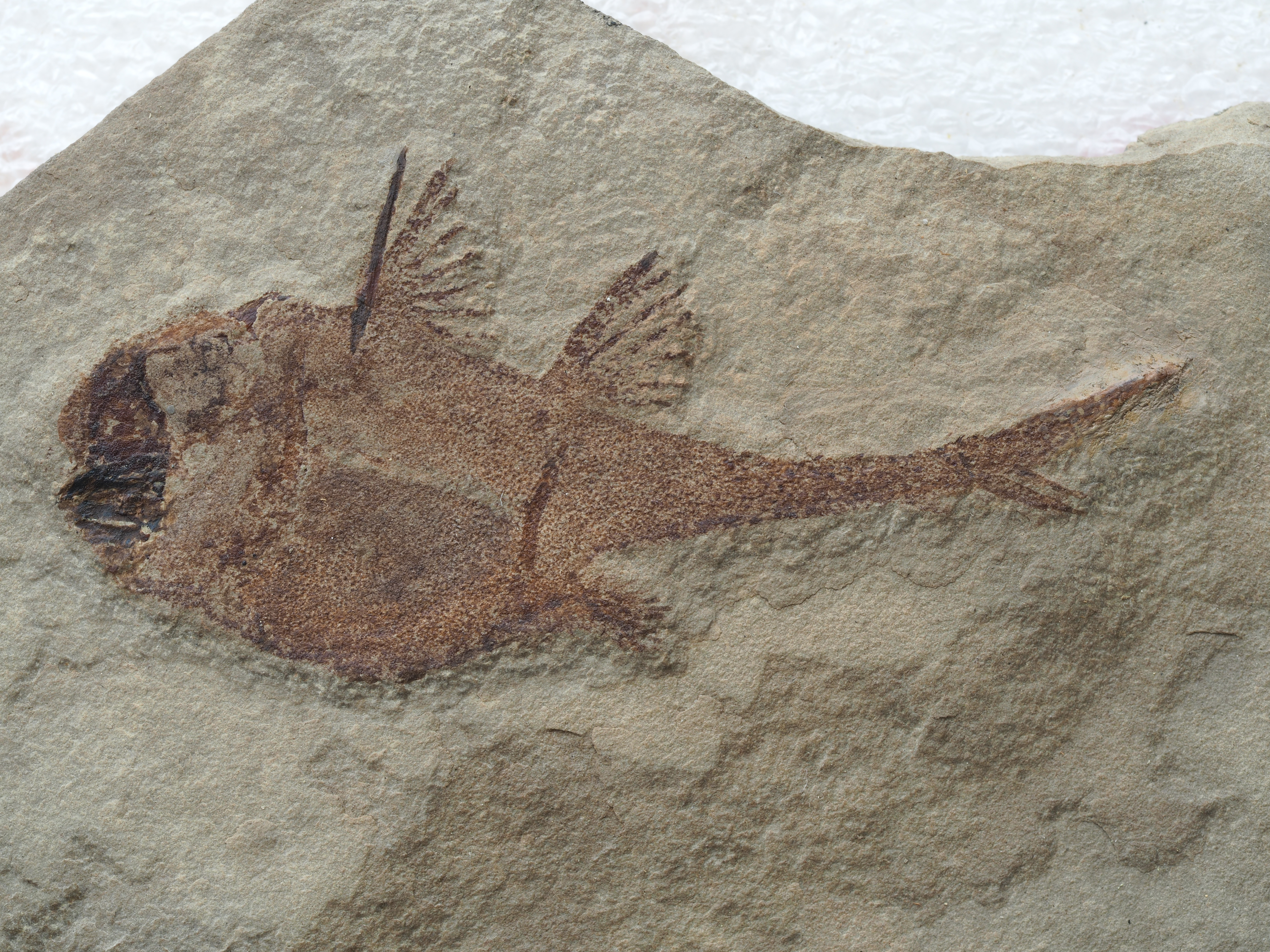
†Echinochimaera meltoni Lund 1977 from the Mississippian of Bear Gulch

  - †Echinochimaera snyderi – type locality for species
- †Edmondia
- †Elrathina
- Eocaudina
- †Falcatus
  - †Falcatus falcatus
- †Favosites
- †Fenestella
- †Fenestrella
- †Geragnostus
- †Hadronector – type locality for genus
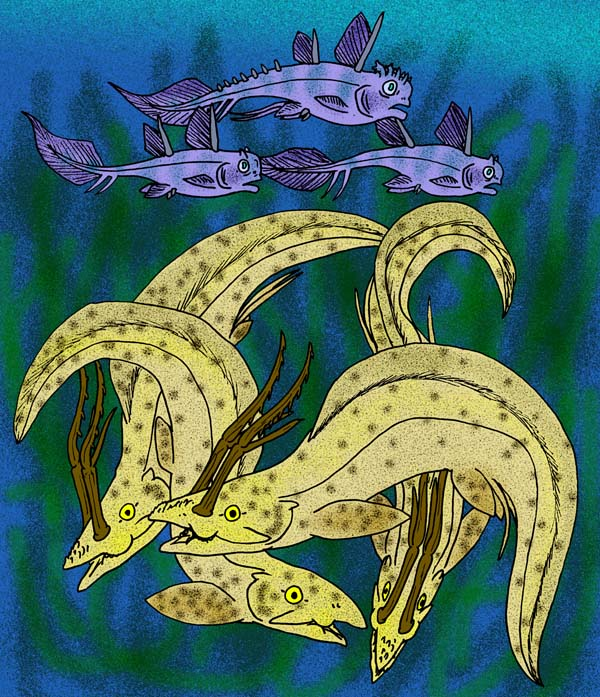
- Restoration (bottom) of the Carboniferous "antlered" Chimaera relative Harpagofututor
  †Harpagofututor – type locality for genus
  - †Harpagofututor volsellorhinus – type locality for species
- †Helicoprion
- †Hyolithes
- †Hypothyris
- †Hypseloconus
- †Irvingella
- †Janassa
- †Joanellia
  - †Joanellia lundi
- †Kendallina
- †Kootenia
- †Lingula
- †Lingulella
- †Lioestheria
- †Lithostrotion
- †Lloydia
- †Lochmocercus – type locality for genus
- †Maladia
- †Martinia
- †Maryvillia
- †Megalaspidella
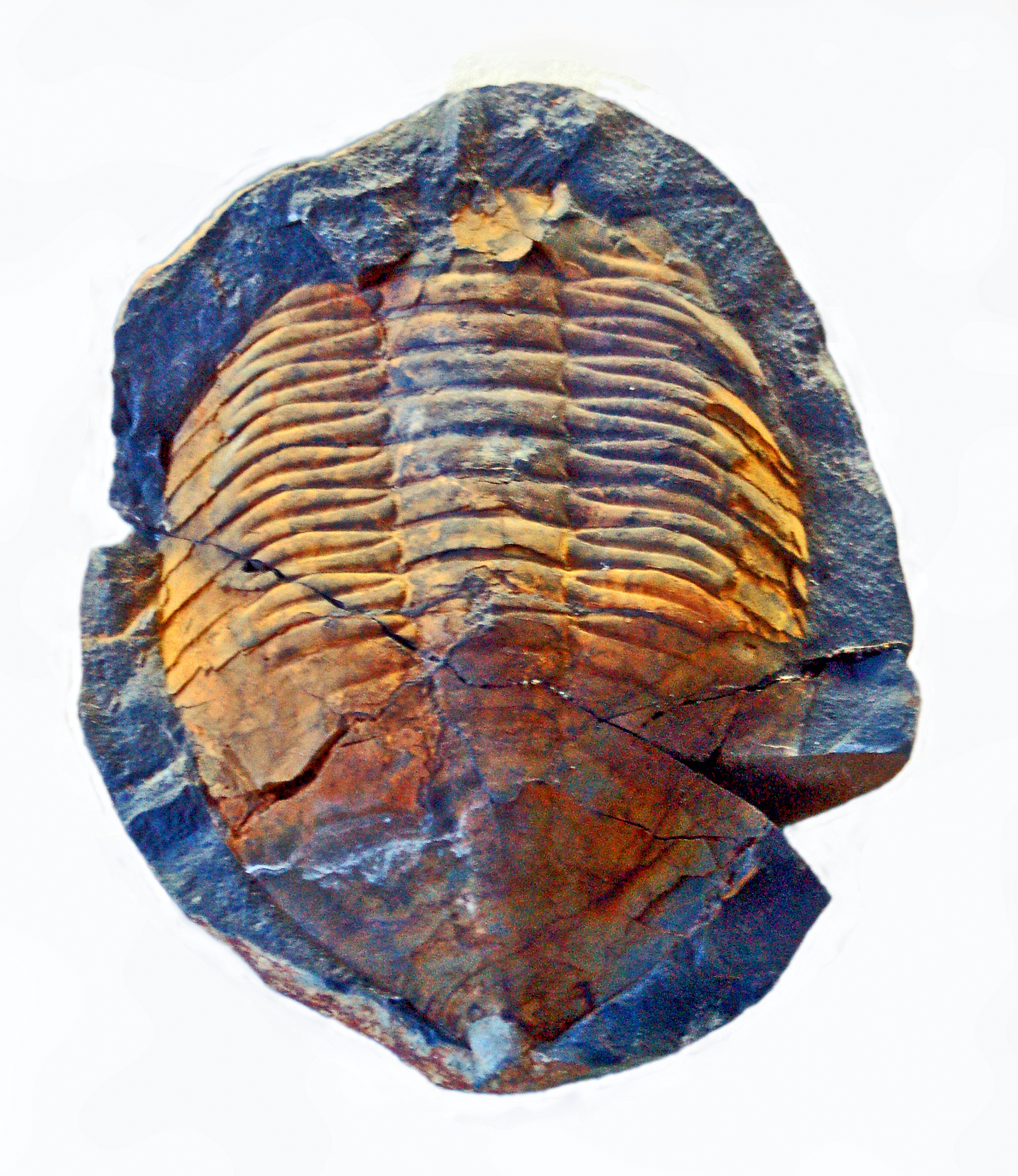
- Fossil of the Cambrian-Silurian trilobite Megistaspis
  †Megistaspis
- †Micromitra
- †Naticopsis
  - †Naticopsis remex – or unidentified comparable form
- †Neospirifer
  - †Neospirifer praenuntius – type locality for species
  - †Neospirifer striatus
- †Netsepoye – type locality for genus
- †Nisusia
- † Nix – type locality for genus
- †Obolus
- †Ogyginus
- †Orygmaspis
- †Ozarkodina
  - †Ozarkodina deflecta
  - †Ozarkodina elongata
  - †Ozarkodina macilenta
  - †Ozarkodina modesta
  - †Ozarkodina regularis
- †Paladin – tentative report
- †Paleolimulus
- †Paratarrasius – type locality for genus
- †Pelagiella
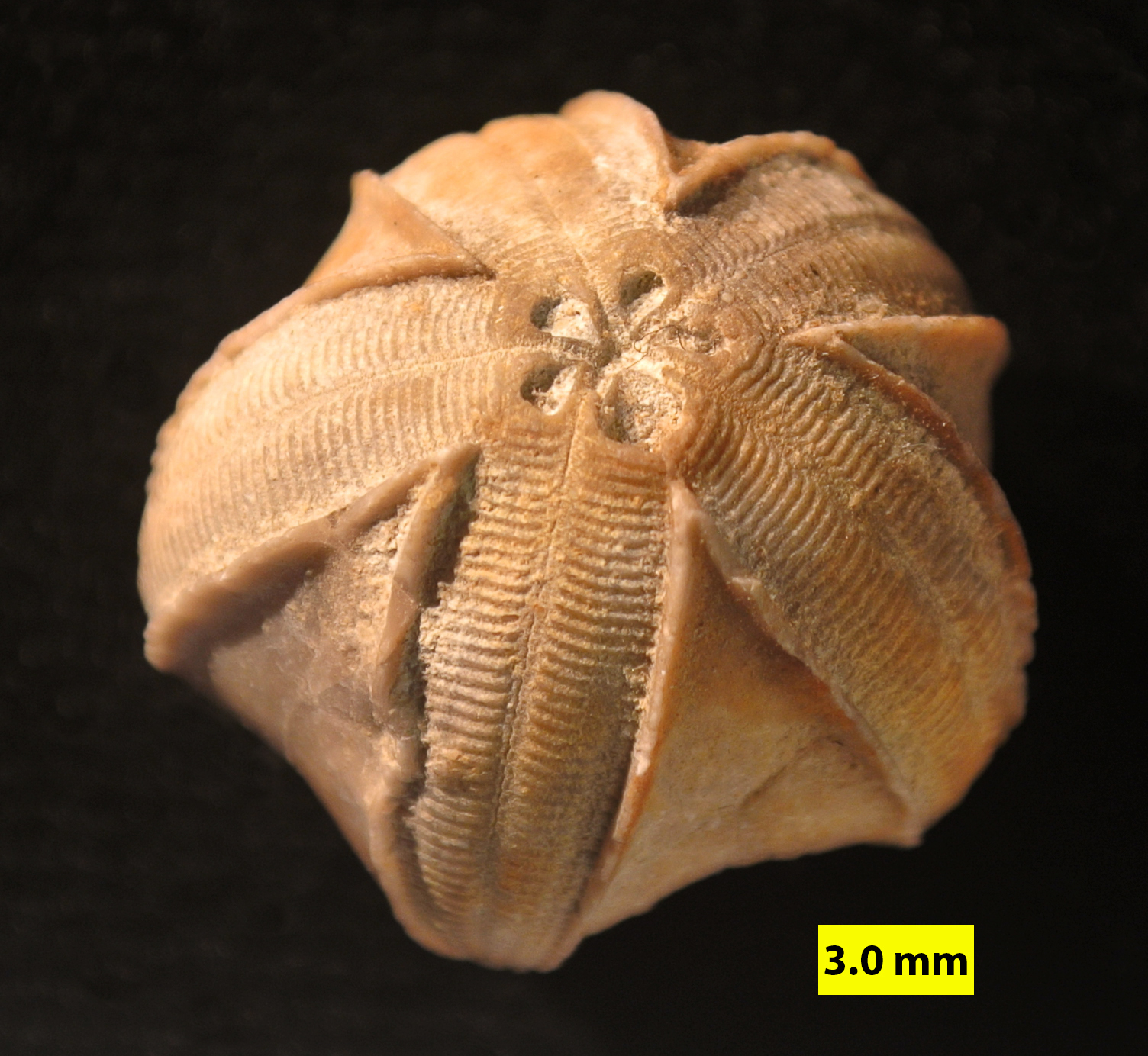
- Fossilized theca of the Carboniferous blastoid echinoderm ("sea bud") Pentremites
  †Pentremites
- †Peronopsis
- †Pinna
- †Platyceras
- †Platyclymenia
- †Polyosteorhynchus – type locality for genus
- †Prodentalium
- †Proetus
- †Prographularia
- †Ptychagnostus
  - †Ptychagnostus atavus
- †Ptychoparia
- † Ramesses – type locality for genus
- †Rota
- †Siksika – type locality for genus
  - †Siksika ottae – type locality for species
- †Soris – type locality for genus
- †Spathognathodus
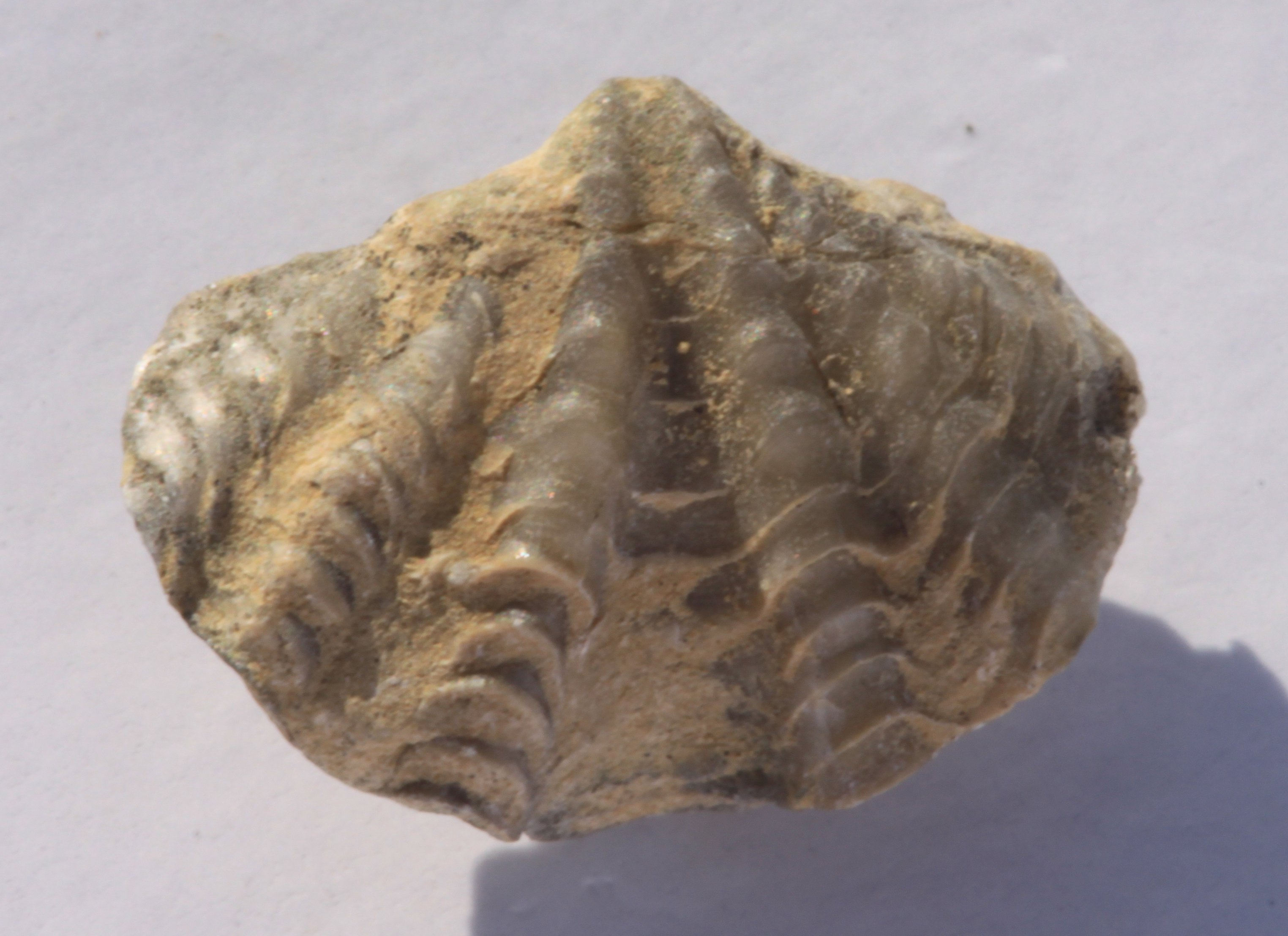
- Fossilized shell of the Late Ordovician-Late Triassic brachiopod Spirifer
  †Spirifer
  - †Spirifer brazerianus – or unidentified related form
  - †Spirifer centronatus
  - †Spirifer greenockensis – or unidentified comparable form
  - †Spirifer grimesi
  - †Spirifer louisianensis – or unidentified related form
  - †Spirifer marionensis – or unidentified comparable form
  - †Spirifer mudulus
  - †Spirifer raymondi
  - †Spirifer shoshonensis
  - †Spirifer welleri – tentative report
- †Spiriferina
- Spirorbis
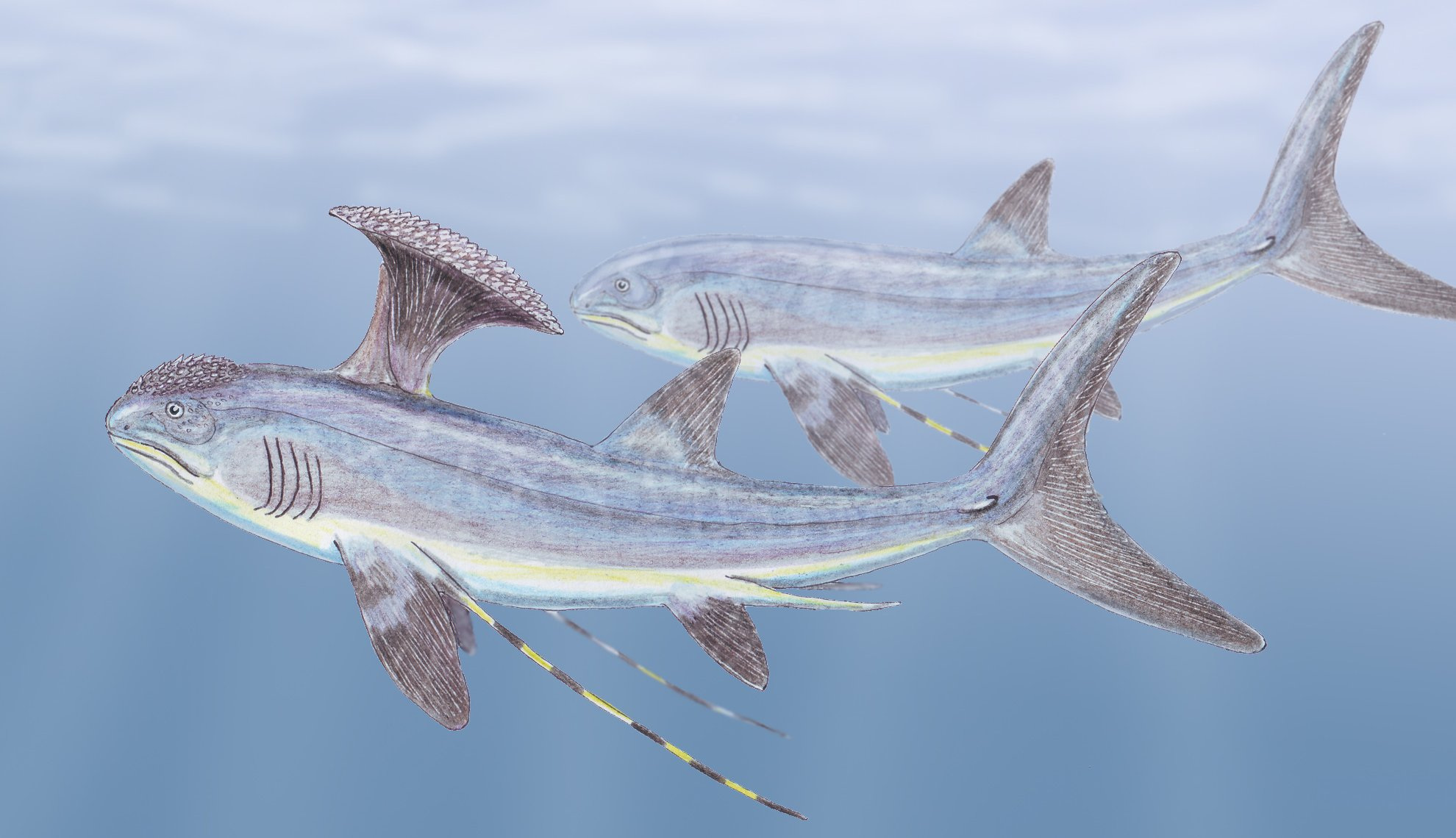
- Life restorations of a male (foreground) and female (background) of the Late Devonian-Carboniferous Chimaera relative Stethacanthus
  †Stethacanthus
  - †Stethacanthus altonensis
- †Syringopora
- †Tornoceras
- †Tylonautilus
- †Westergaardodina
- †Wilkingia
- †Worthenia – tentative report

== Mesozoic ==
=== Selected Mesozoic taxa of Montana ===
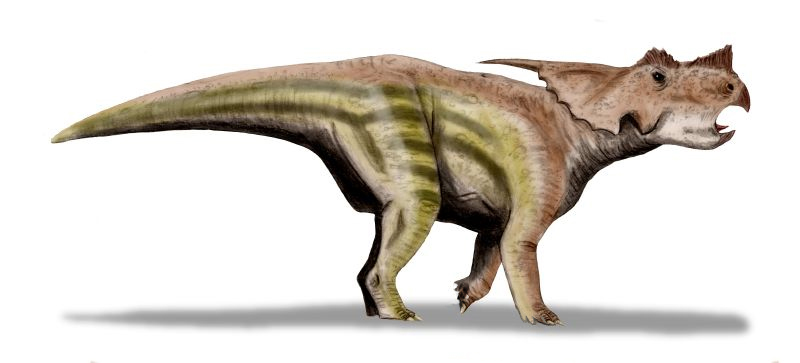
- Life restoration of the Late Cretaceous horned dinosaur Achelousaurus
  †Achelousaurus – type locality for genus
  - †Achelousaurus horneri – type locality for species
- †Acheroraptor – type locality for genus
  - †Acheroraptor temertyorum – type locality for species
- Acipenser
- †Acristavus – type locality for genus
  - †Acristavus gagslarsoni – type locality for species
- †Adocus
- †Albanerpeton
  - †Albanerpeton nexuosus
- †Albertaceratops
  - †Albertaceratops nesmoi
- †Albertosaurus
- †Allocrioceras
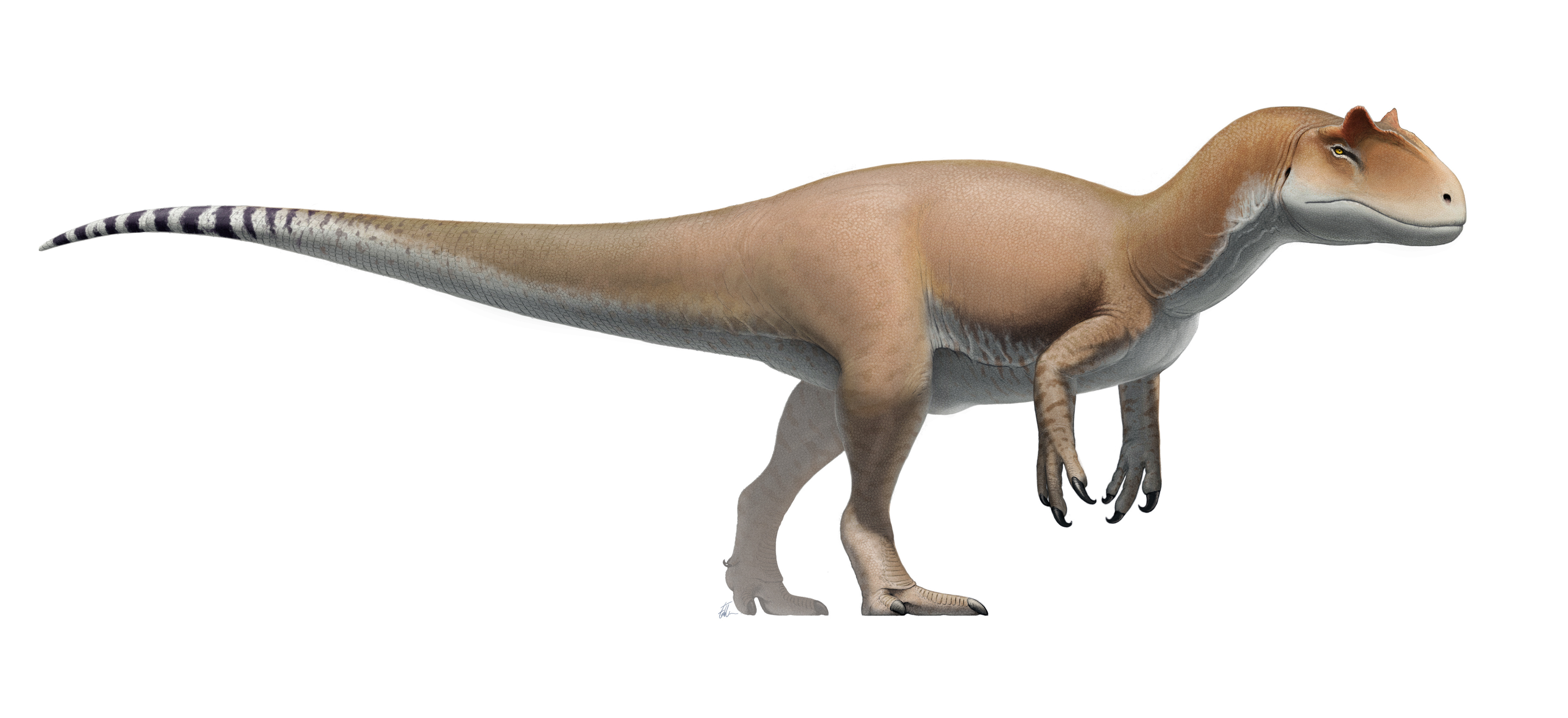
- Life restoration of the Late Jurassic theropod dinosaur Allosaurus
  †Allosaurus
- †Alphadon
  - †Alphadon attaragos
  - †Alphadon halleyi – type locality for species
  - †Alphadon marshi
  - †Alphadon wilsoni
- †Alzadasaurus – tentative report
- Amia
- †Amphicoelias
- †Anatotitan
  - †Anatotitan copei
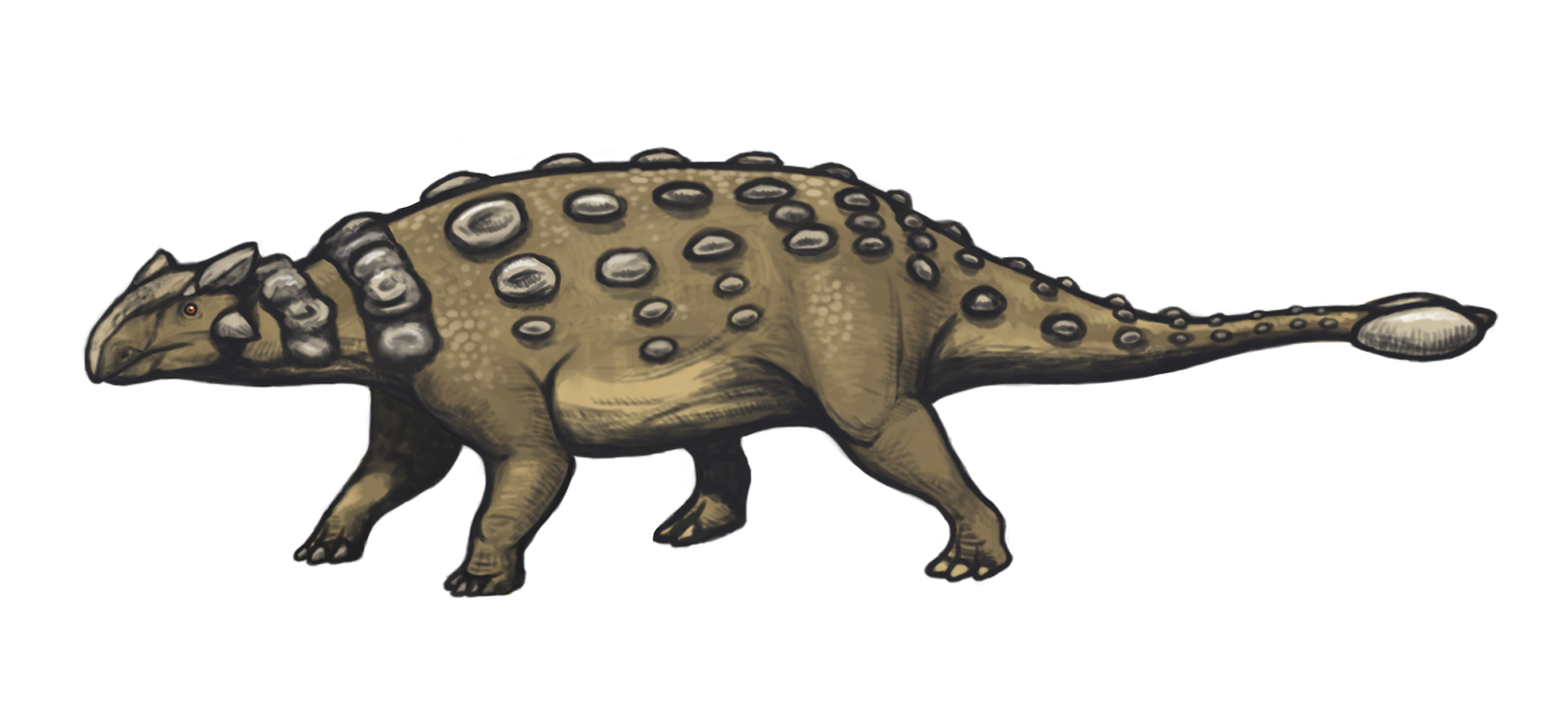
- Life restoration of the Late Cretaceous armored dinosaur Ankylosaurus
  †Ankylosaurus – type locality for genus
  - †Ankylosaurus magniventris – type locality for species
- †Aquilops – type locality for genus
  - †Aquilops americanus – type locality for species
- Aralia – or unidentified comparable form
- †Arcticoceras – tentative report
- †Arctocephalites
  - †Arctocephalites gracilis – or unidentified comparable form
  - †Arctocephalites maculatus – or unidentified comparable form
  - †Arctocephalites platynotus – or unidentified comparable form
  - †Arctocephalites sawtoothensis
  - †Arctocephalites saypoensis
- †Asplenium
- Astarte
- †Aublysodon
  - †Aublysodon mirandus
- †Avaceratops – type locality for genus
  - †Avaceratops lammersi – type locality for species
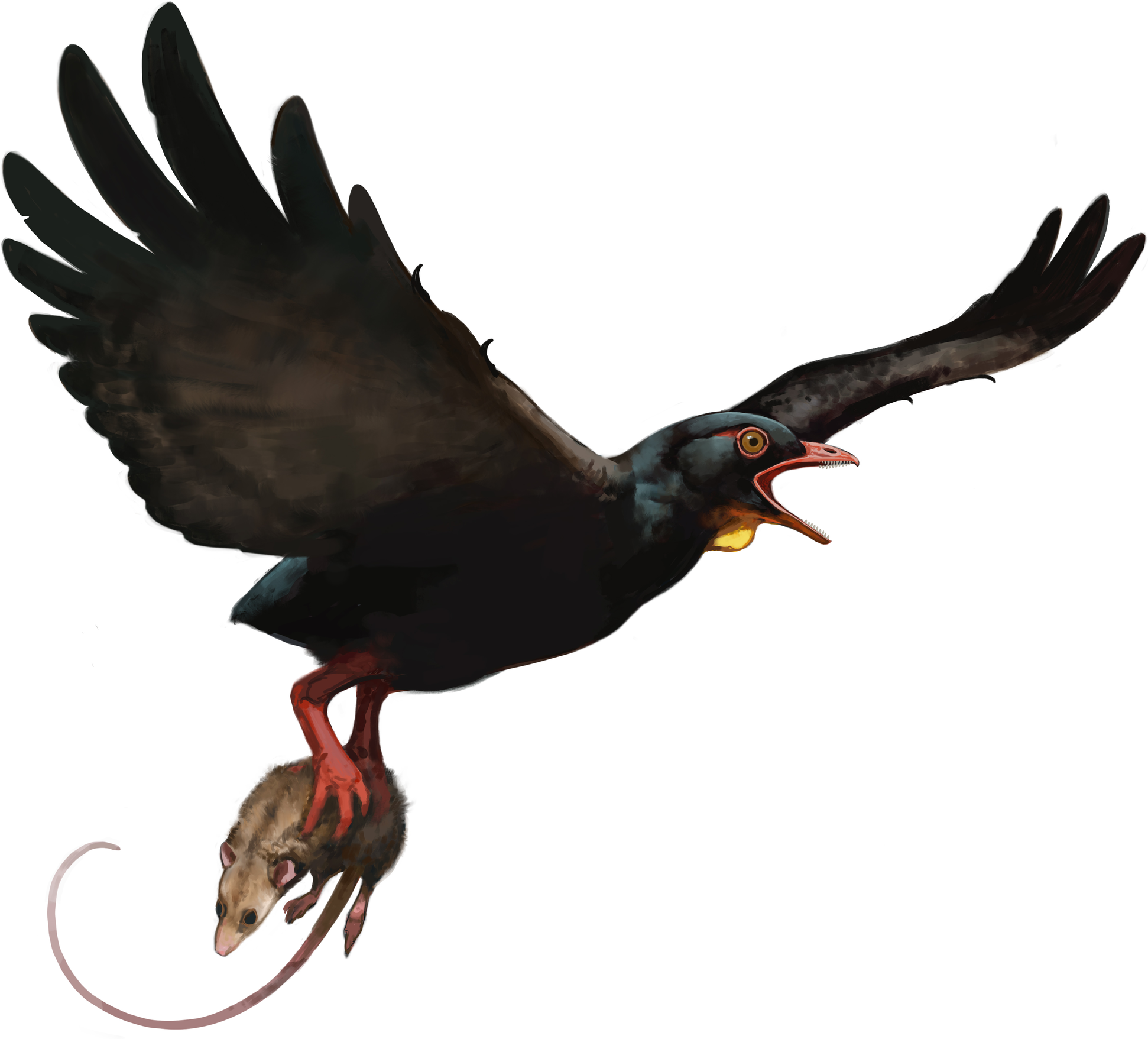
- Life restoration of the Late Cretaceous toothed bird Avisaurus with prey
  †Avisaurus – type locality for genus
  - †Avisaurus archibaldi – type locality for species
  - †Avisaurus gloriae – type locality for species
- Azolla
- †Baculites
  - †Baculites asper
  - †Baculites codyensis
  - †Baculites compressus
  - †Baculites mariasensis
- †Baena
- †Bambiraptor – type locality for genus
  - †Bambiraptor feinbergi – type locality for species
- Barbourula – or unidentified comparable form
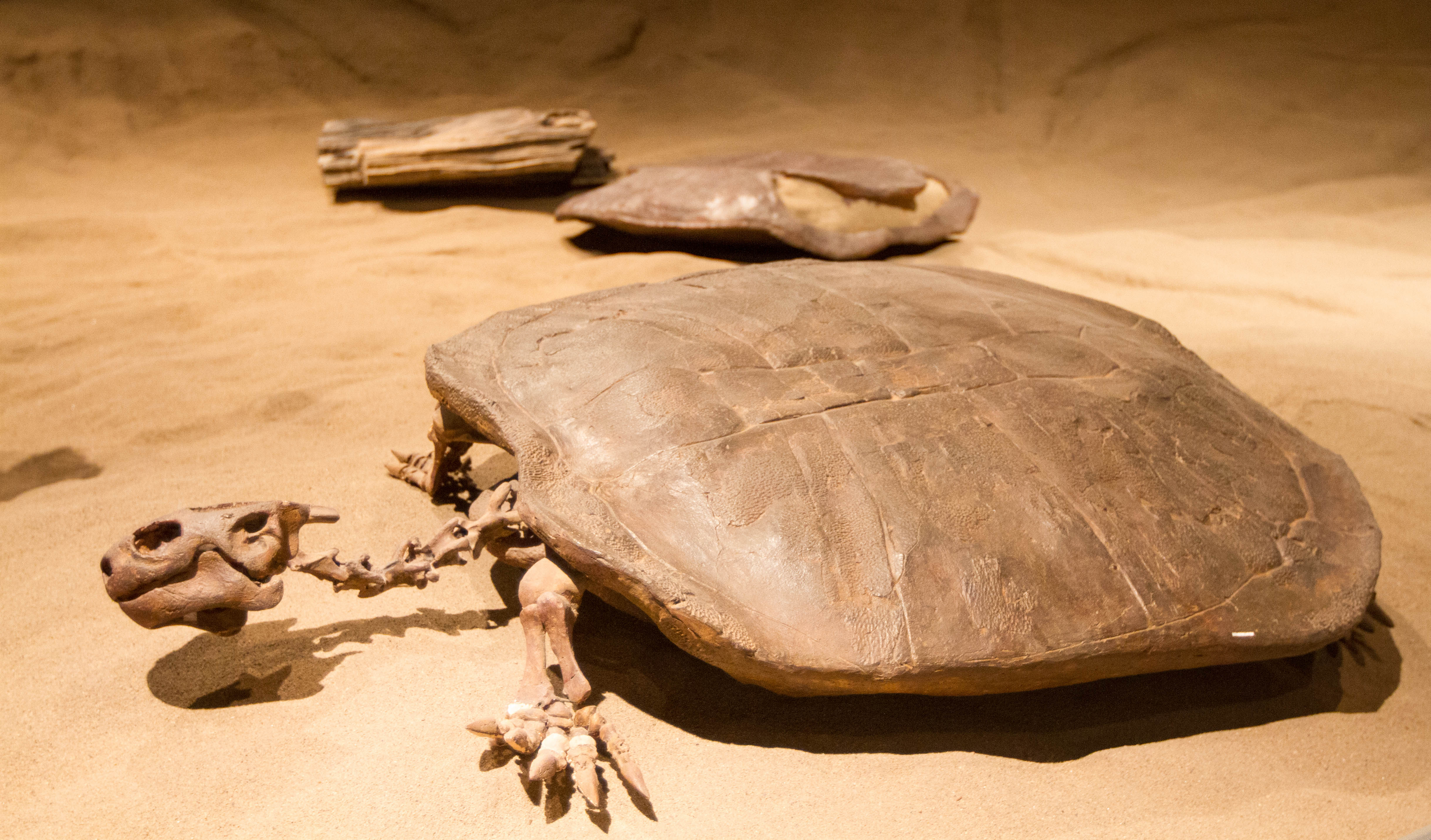
- Mounted fossilized skeleton of the Cretaceous turtle Basilemys
  †Basilemys
- †Belonostomus
  - †Belonostomus longirostris
- †Bernissartia
- †Borealosuchus
  - †Borealosuchus sternbergii
- Brachaelurus
- †Brachyceratops – type locality for genus
  - †Brachyceratops montanensis – type locality for species
- †Brachychampsa – type locality for genus
  - †Brachychampsa montana – type locality for species
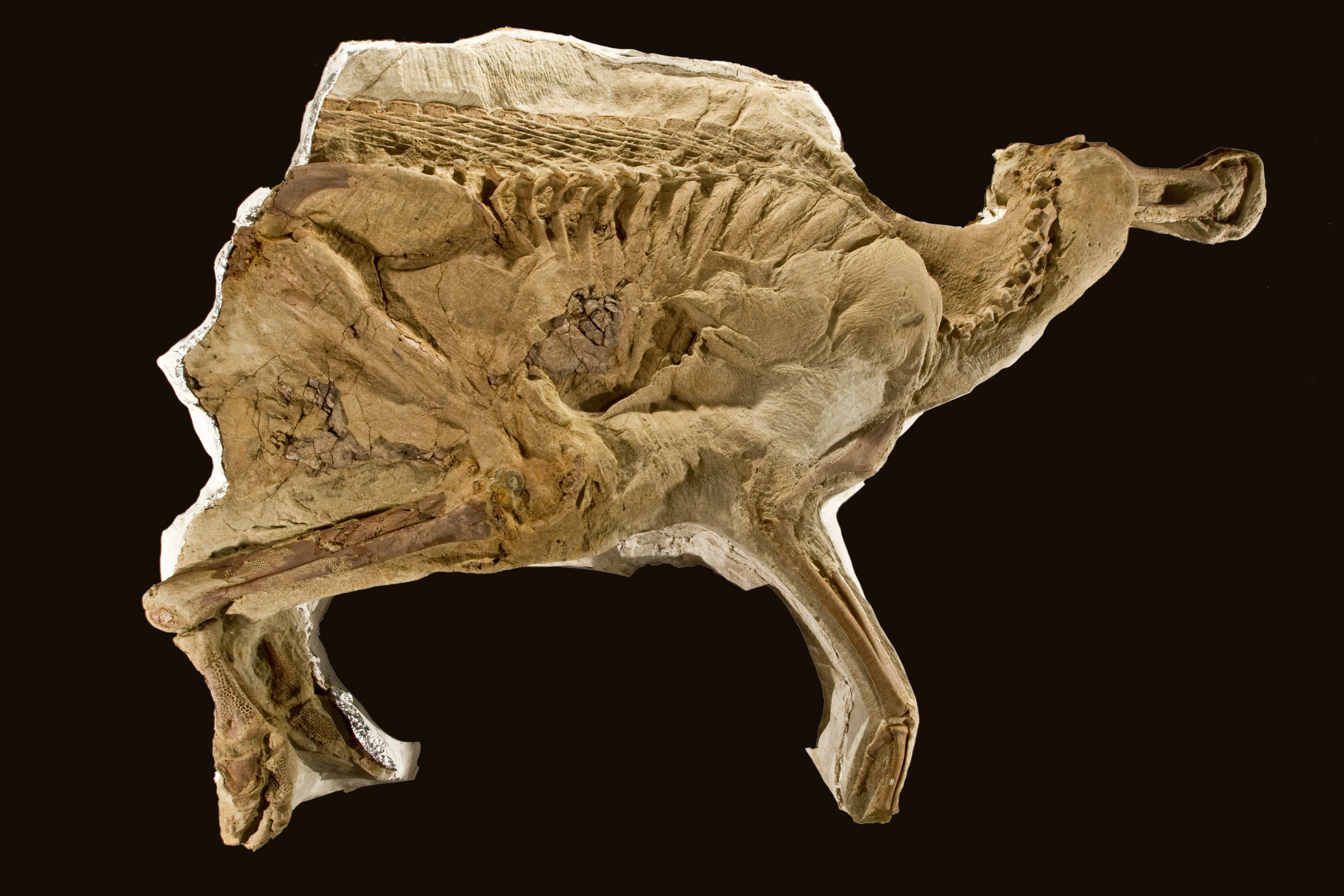
- Fossilized natural mummy of the Late Cretaceous duck-billed dinosaur Brachylophosaurus
  †Brachylophosaurus
  - †Brachylophosaurus canadensis – type locality for species
- †Camarasaurus
- Campeloma
- Carcharias
- †Cedrobaena
- †Centrosaurus
- †Cerasinops – type locality for genus
  - †Cerasinops hodgskissi – type locality for species
- †Ceratodus
- †Ceratops – type locality for genus
  - †Ceratops montanus – type locality for species
- †Chamops
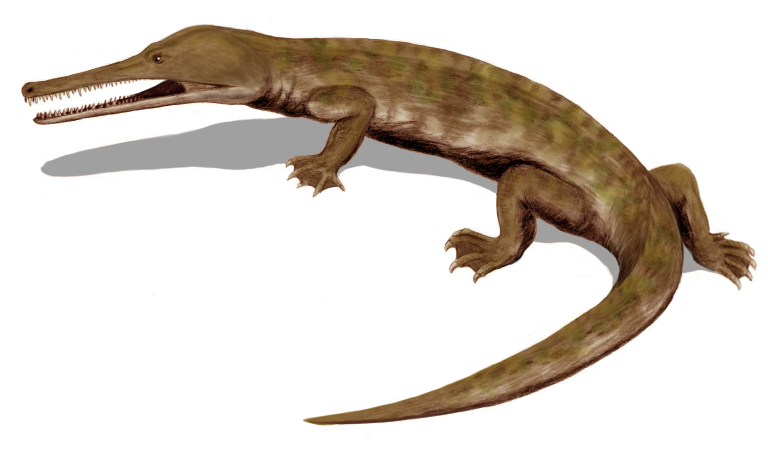
- Life restoration of the Late Cretaceous-Eocene choristoderan reptile Champsosaurus
  †Champsosaurus
- †Chasmosaurus – or unidentified comparable form
- Chiloscyllium
- †Chirostenotes
  - †Chirostenotes elegans
- Chlamys
- †Chondroceras
- †Cimexomys
  - †Cimexomys minor
- †Cimolestes
  - †Cimolestes incisus
  - †Cimolestes stirtoni
- †Cimoliasaurus
- †Cimolodon
  - †Cimolodon nitidus
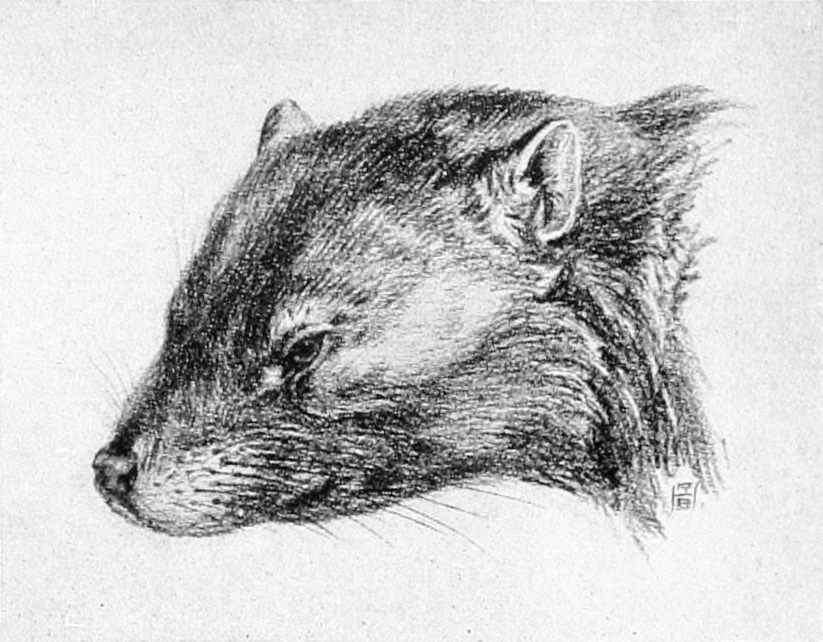
- Life restoration of the face of the Late Cretaceous multituberculate mammal Cimolomys
  †Cimolomys
  - †Cimolomys clarki – type locality for species
  - †Cimolomys gracilis
- †Cimolopteryx
  - †Cimolopteryx maxima
- Cladophlebis
  - †Cladophlebis alberta
  - †Cladophlebis constricta
  - †Cladophlebis heterophylla
  - †Cladophlebis inclinata
  - †Cladophlebis oblongifolia
  - †Cladophlebis oerstedi
  - †Cladophlebis virginiensis
- †Claosaurus
- †Claraia
  - †Claraia aurita
  - †Claraia clarai
  - †Claraia mulleri
  - †Claraia stachei
- †Clidastes
- †Componocancer
  - †Componocancer roberti
- †Compsemys
- †Coniophis
- †Continuoolithus
- †Coriops
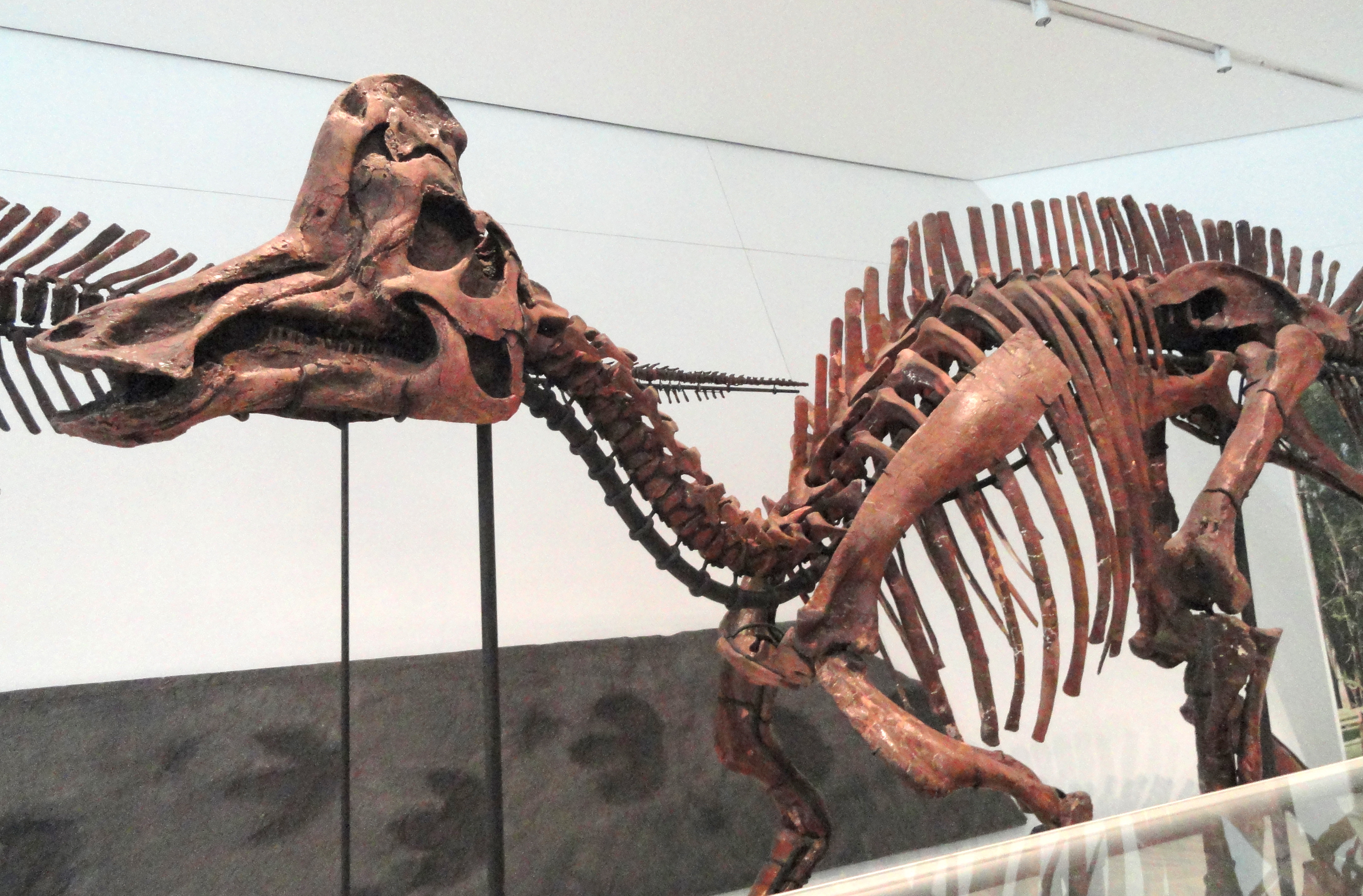
- Mounted fossilized skeleton of the Late Cretaceous duck-billed dinosaur Corythosaurus
  †Corythosaurus
  - †Corythosaurus casuarius
- †Cretolamna
  - †Cretolamna appendiculata
- †Cretorectolobus – type locality for genus
  - †Cretorectolobus olsoni – type locality for species
- †Crocodilus
- Cucullaea
- †Daspletosaurus
  - †Daspletosaurus horneri – type locality for species
- †Deinodon – type locality for genus
  - †Deinodon horridus – type locality for species
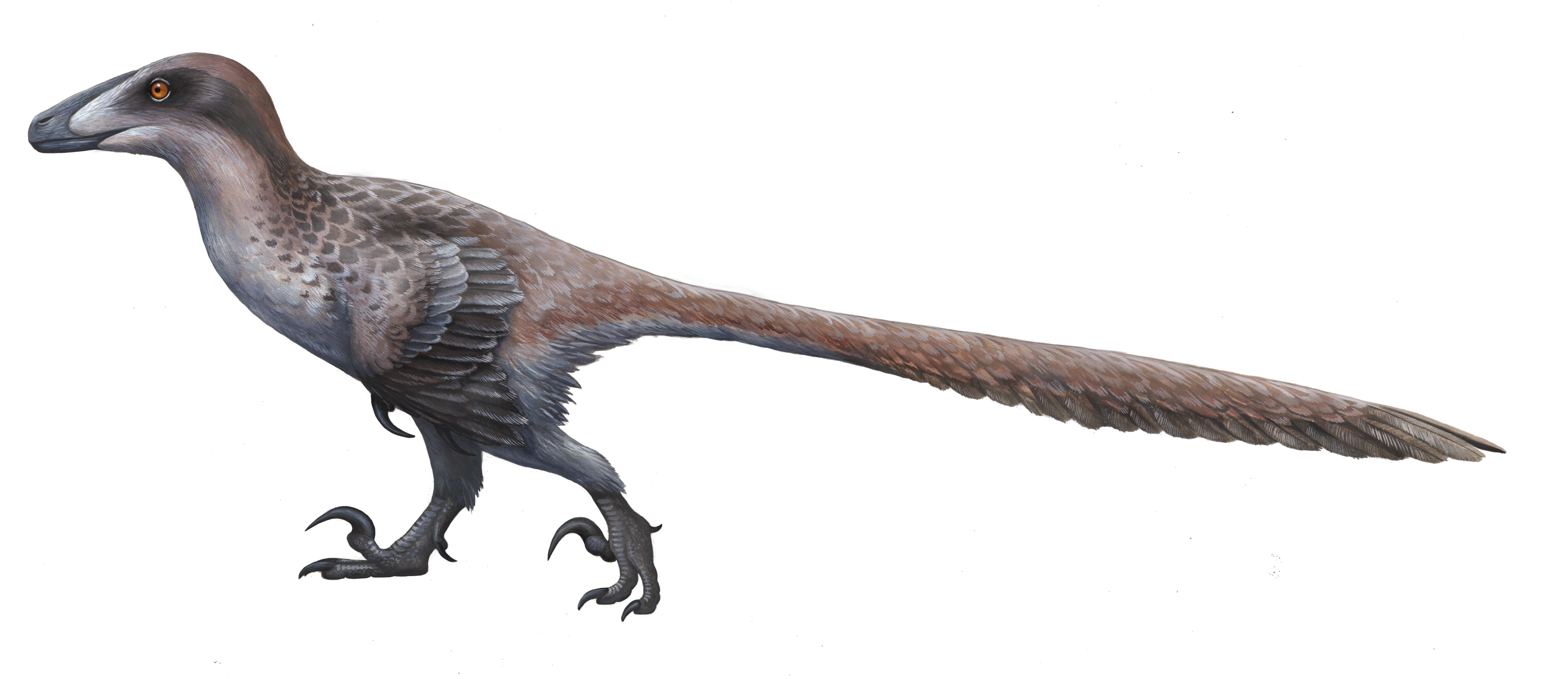
- Life restoration of the Early Cretaceous dromaeosaur ("raptor") Deinonychus
  †Deinonychus – type locality for genus
  - †Deinonychus antirrhopus – type locality for species
- †Deinosuchus – type locality for genus
  - †Deinosuchus rugosus – type locality for species
- Dentalium
- †Derrisemys
- †Diclonius
- †Didelphodon
- †Didymoceras
  - †Didymoceras cheyennense
  - †Didymoceras nebrascense
  - †Didymoceras stevensoni
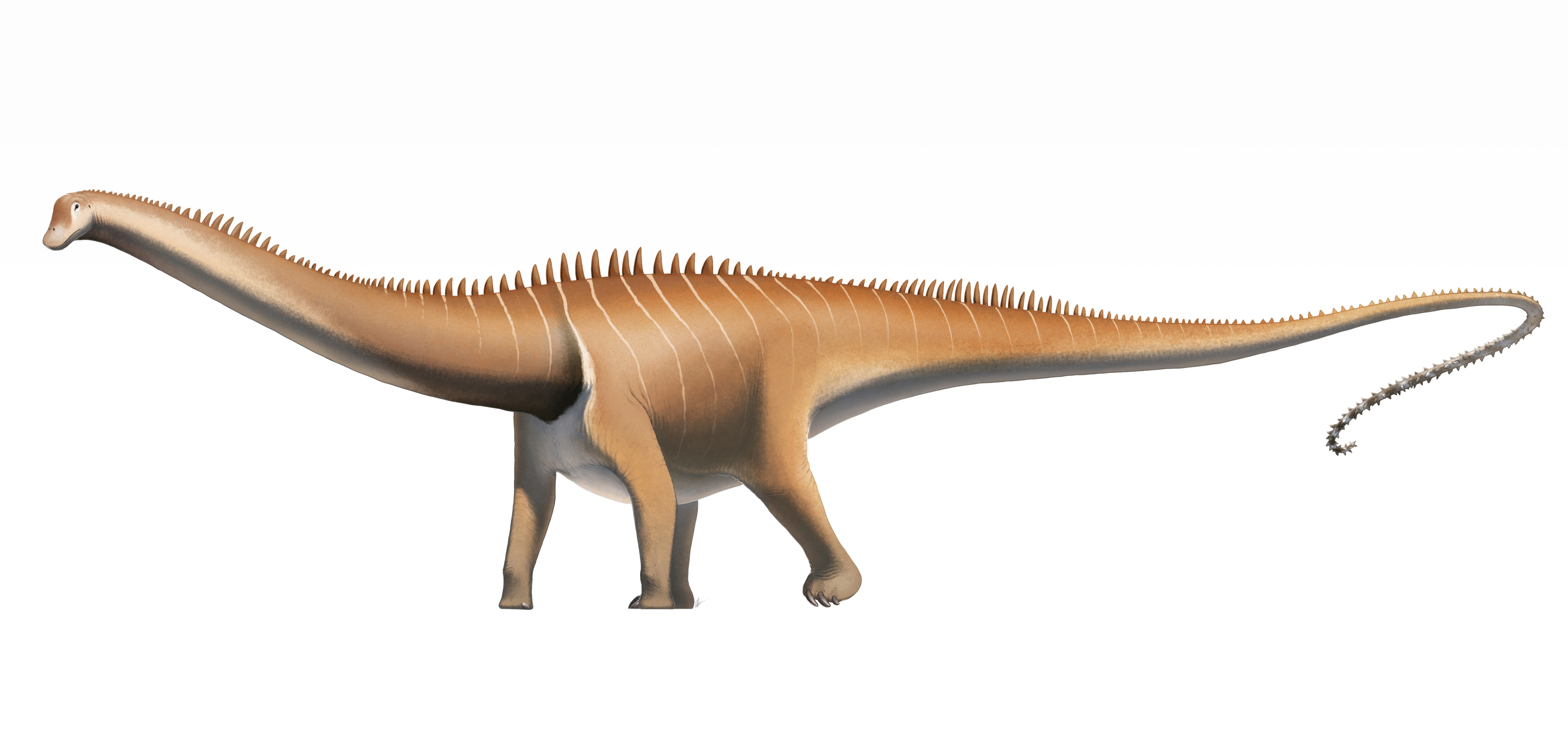
- Life restoration of the Late Jurassic long-necked dinosaur Diplodocus
  †Diplodocus
- †Doratodon – or unidentified comparable form
- †Dromaeosaurus
  - †Dromaeosaurus albertensis
- †Dyoplosaurus
  - †Dyoplosaurus acutosquameus
- †Edgarosaurus
  - †Edgarosaurus muddi
- †Edmontonia
  - †Edmontonia longiceps
  - †Edmontonia rugosidens – type locality for species
- †Edmontosaurus
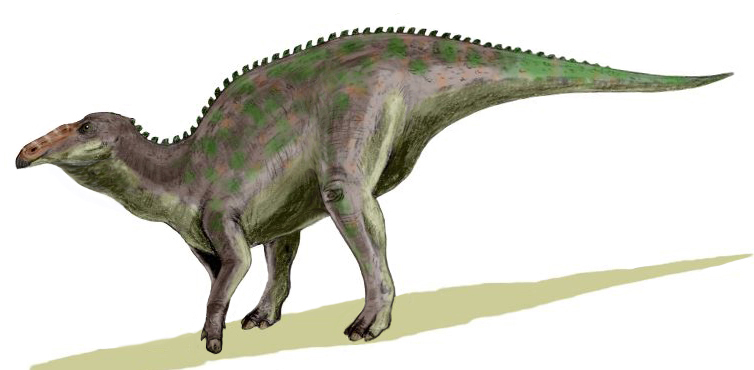
  - Life restoration of the Late Cretaceous duck-billed dinosaur Edmontosaurus annectens
    †Edmontosaurus annectens
- †Einiosaurus – type locality for genus
  - †Einiosaurus procurvicornis – type locality for species
- †Emarginachelys – type locality for genus
  - †Emarginachelys cretacea – type locality for species
- †Eodelphis
- †Eopelobates – or unidentified comparable form
- †Equisetum
- †Essonodon – type locality for genus
  - †Essonodon browni – type locality for species
- †Eucrossorhinus
- †Euomphaloceras
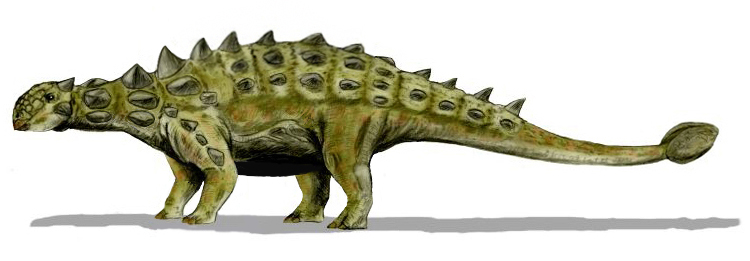
- Restoration of the Late Cretaceous armored dinosaur Euoplocephalus
  †Euoplocephalus
  - †Euoplocephalus tutus
- †Eutrephoceras
- †Exiteloceras
- †Exogyra
- Ficus – or unidentified comparable form
- †Gervillia
- †Gilmoremys
  - †Gilmoremys lancensis
- Ginkgo
- †Ginkgoites
- †Glishades – type locality for genus
  - †Glishades ericksoni – type locality for species
- †Glyptops
- Glyptostrobus – or unidentified comparable form
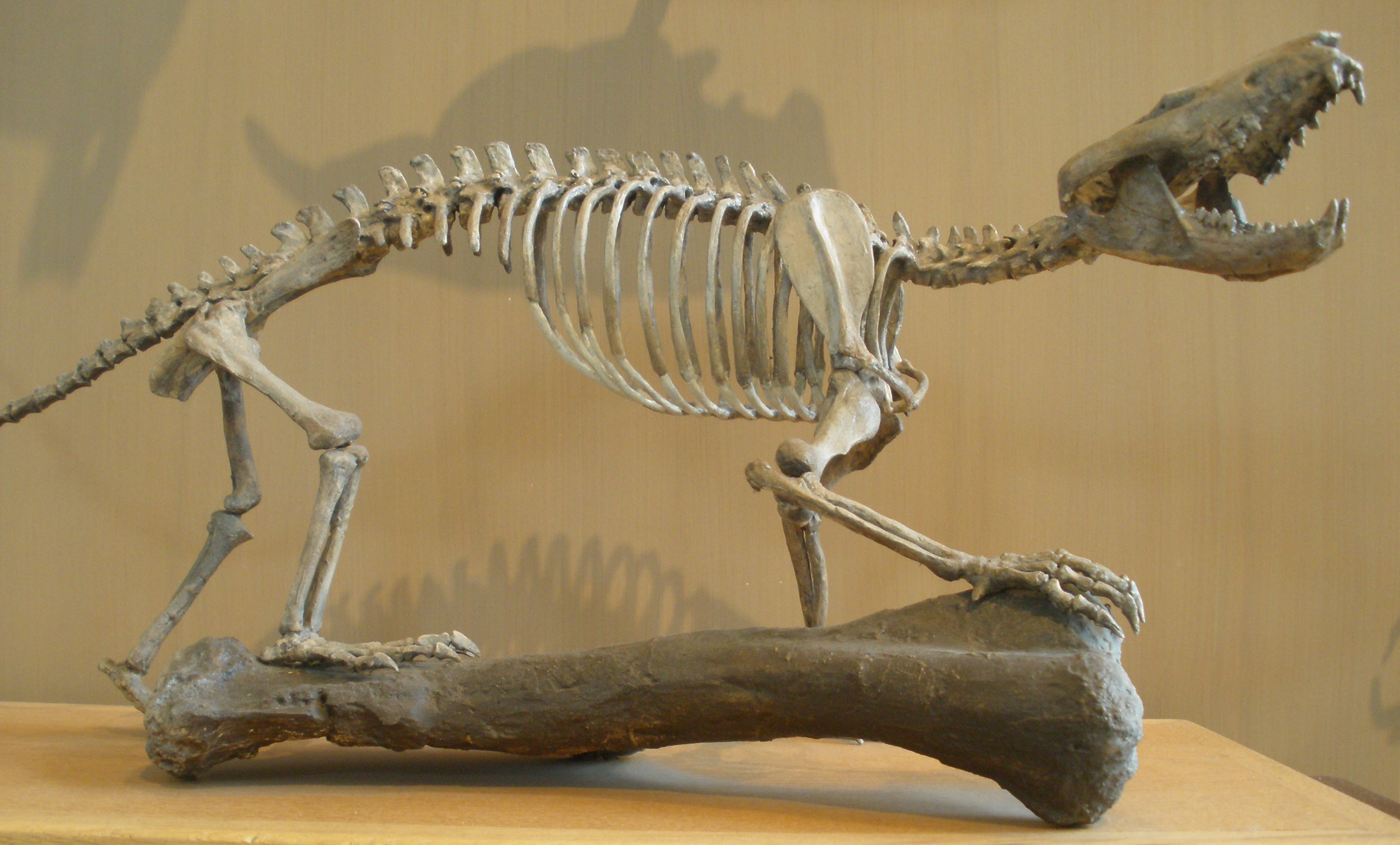
- Mounted fossilized skeleton of the Middle Jurassic-Late Cretaceous mammal Gobiconodon
  †Gobiconodon – type locality for genus
- †Goniobasis
- †Gorgosaurus
  - †Gorgosaurus libratus – type locality for species
- †Gryphaea
  - †Gryphaea impressimarginata
- †Gryposaurus
  - †Gryposaurus latidens – type locality for species
  - †Gryposaurus notabilis
- †Habrosaurus
  - †Habrosaurus dilatus
- †Hadrosaurus
  - †Hadrosaurus breviceps – type locality for species
  - †Hadrosaurus paucidens – type locality for species
- †Hamites
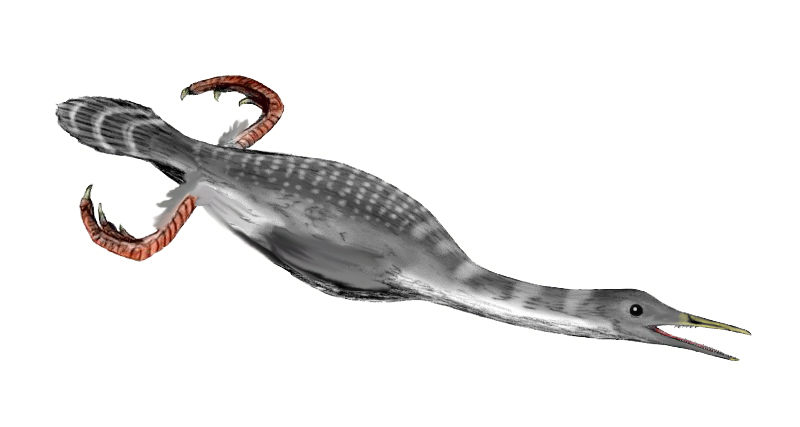
- Life restoration of the Late Cretaceous toothed bird Hesperornis
  †Hesperornis
- †Hybodus
  - †Hybodus montanensis – type locality for species
- †Hypacrosaurus
  - †Hypacrosaurus stebingeri – type locality for species
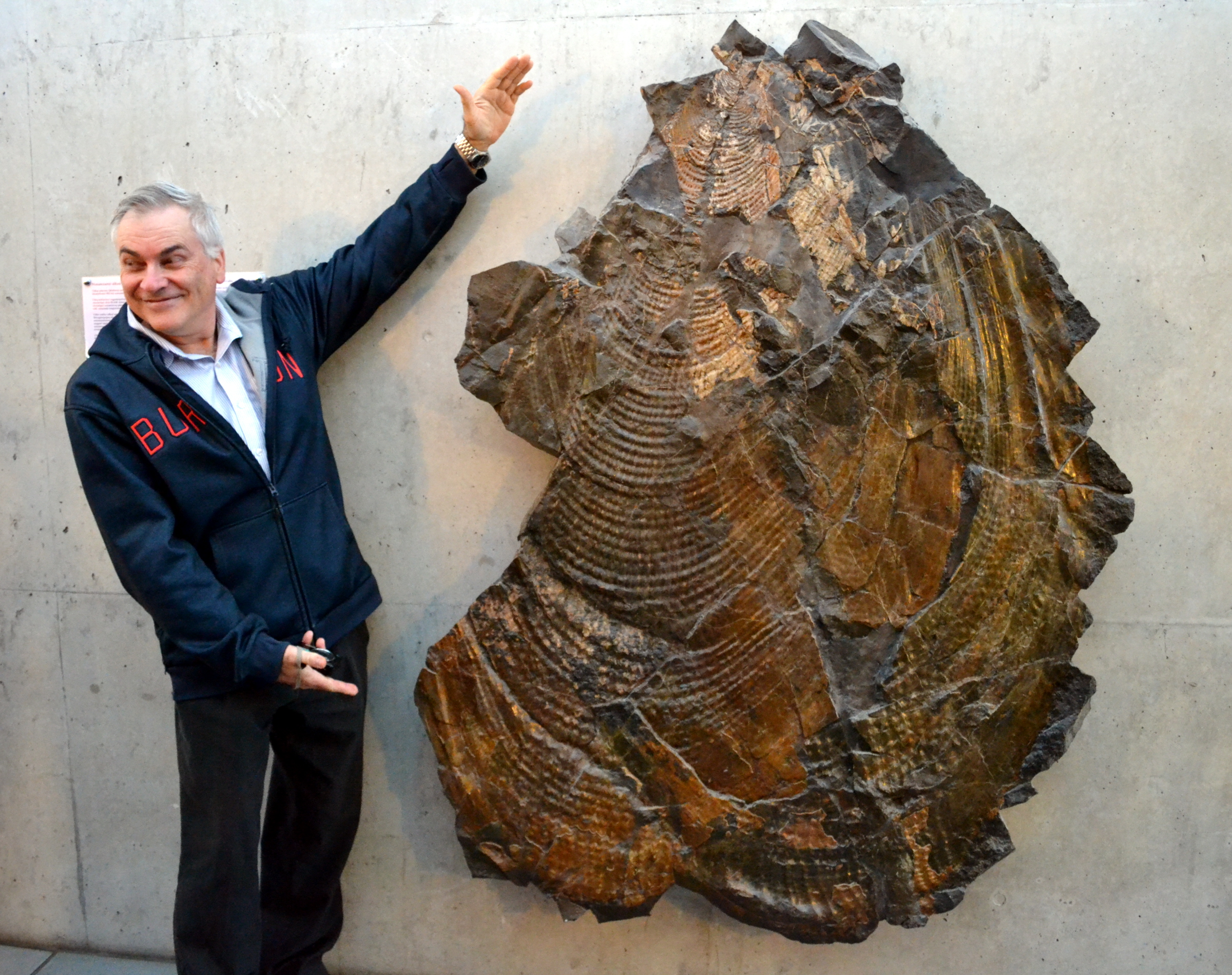
- Fossilized shell of the Early Jurassic-Late Cretaceous marine bivalve Inoceramus with a human indicating its size
  †Inoceramus
  - †Inoceramus arnoldi
  - †Inoceramus canaliculatus
  - †Inoceramus cancellatus
  - †Inoceramus cardissoides - or unidentified loosely related form
  - †Inoceramus cordiformis – or unidentified comparable form
  - †Inoceramus erectus
  - †Inoceramus fragilis – or unidentified related form
  - †Inoceramus frechi – or unidentified comparable form
  - †Inoceramus gibbosus
  - †Inoceramus gilli – type locality for species
  - †Inoceramus glacierensis – type locality for species
  - †Inoceramus koeneni
  - †Inoceramus latisulcatus – or unidentified comparable form
  - †Inoceramus lesginensis
  - †Inoceramus lingua – or unidentified comparable form
  - †Inoceramus lundbreckensis
  - †Inoceramus sokolovi – type locality for species
  - †Inoceramus undabundus
  - †Inoceramus walterdorfensis
- †Ischyodus
  - †Ischyodus bifurcatus
- †Ischyrhiza
  - †Ischyrhiza avonicola
  - †Ischyrhiza mira
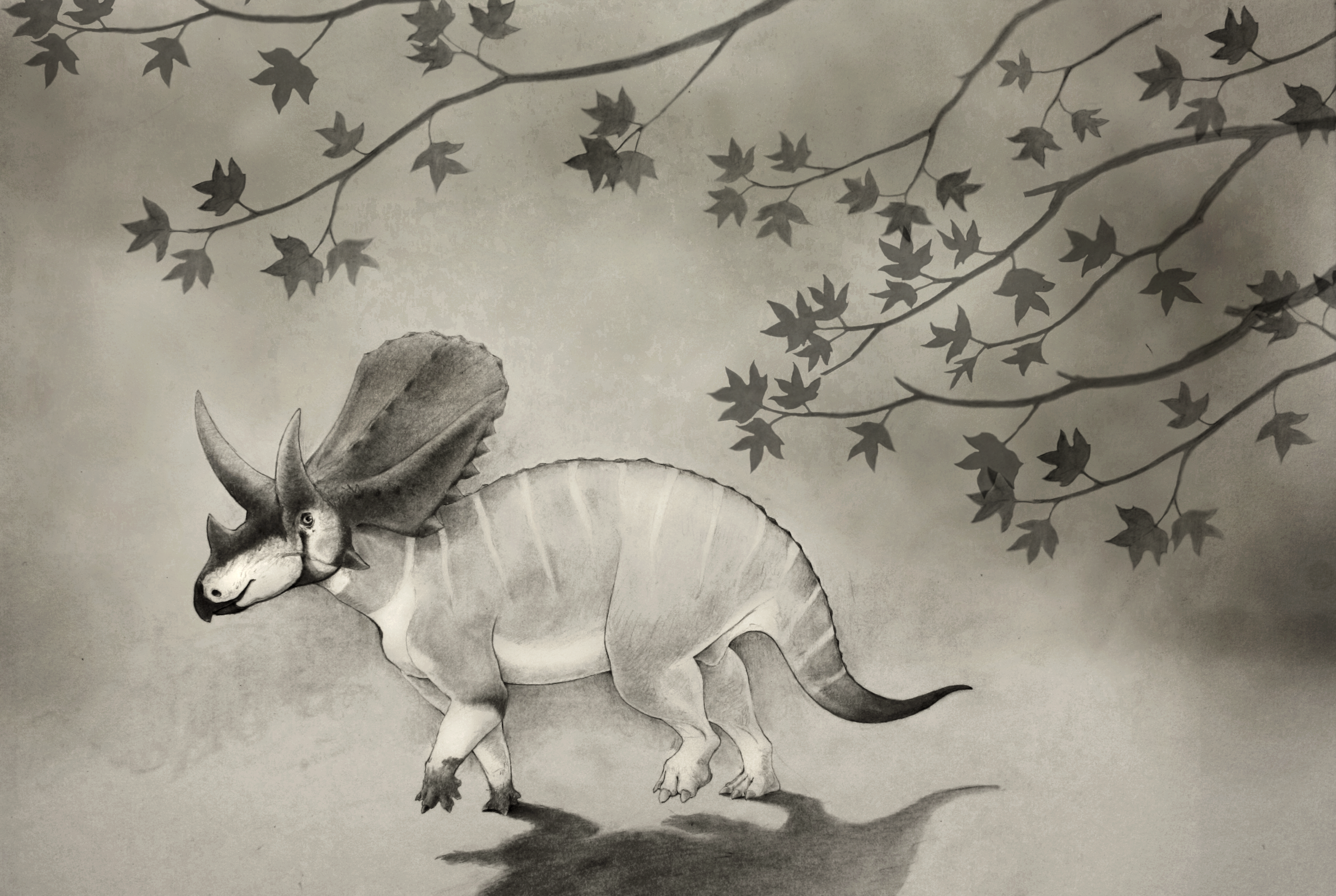
- Life restoration of the Late Cretaceous horned dinosaur Judiceratops
  †Judiceratops – type locality for genus
  - †Judiceratops tigris – type locality for species
- †Kritosaurus
- †Krokolithes
- †Lepidotes
  - †Lepidotes haydeni – type locality for species
  - †Lepidotes occidentalis – type locality for species
- Lepisosteus
- †Leptalestes
  - †Leptalestes cooki
  - †Leptalestes krejcii
  - †Leptalestes prokrejcii
  - †Leptalestes toevsi – type locality for species
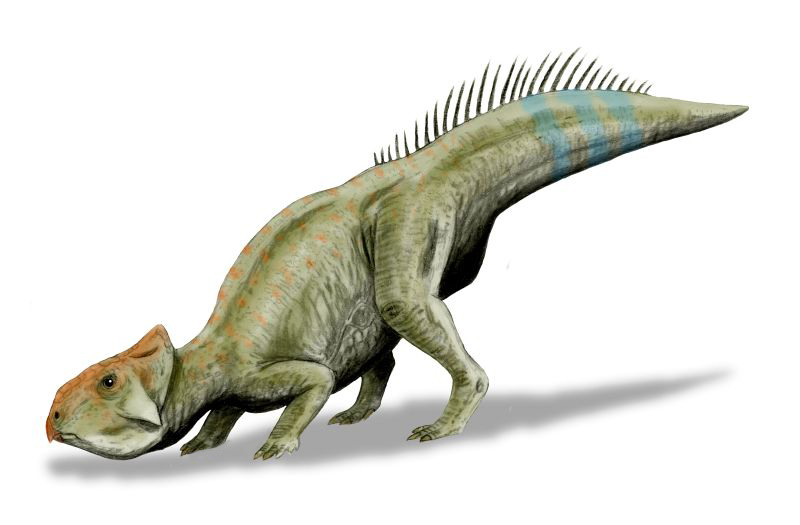
- Life restoration of the Late Cretaceous primitive horned dinosaur Leptoceratops
  †Leptoceratops
  - †Leptoceratops gracilis
- †Leptorhynchos – tentative report
- †Lingula
- †Lisserpeton – type locality for genus
  - †Lisserpeton atlantes
  - †Lisserpeton bairdi – type locality for species
- †Lonchidion
- Lopha
- † Lucina
- Lunatia
- †Magnuviator – type locality for genus
- †Maiasaura – type locality for genus
  - †Maiasaura peeblesorum – type locality for species
- †Medusaceratops – type locality for genus
  - †Medusaceratops lokii – type locality for species
- †Melvius – type locality for genus
- †Meniscoessus
  - †Meniscoessus major
  - †Meniscoessus robustus – type locality for species
- †Mercuriceratops – type locality for genus
  - †Mercuriceratops gemini – type locality for species
- †Mesodma
  - †Mesodma formosa
  - †Mesodma hensleighi
  - †Mesodma primaeva
  - †Mesodma thompsoni
- †Metoicoceras
  - †Metoicoceras geslinianum
  - †Metoicoceras mosbyense – type locality for species
  - †Metoicoceras muelleri
- †Metzgeriites
- †Microvenator – type locality for genus
  - †Microvenator celer – type locality for species
- †Modiolus
- †Monoclonius – type locality for genus
  - †Monoclonius crassus – type locality for species
  - †Monoclonius recurvicornis – type locality for species
  - †Monoclonius sphenocerus – type locality for species
- †Montanalestes
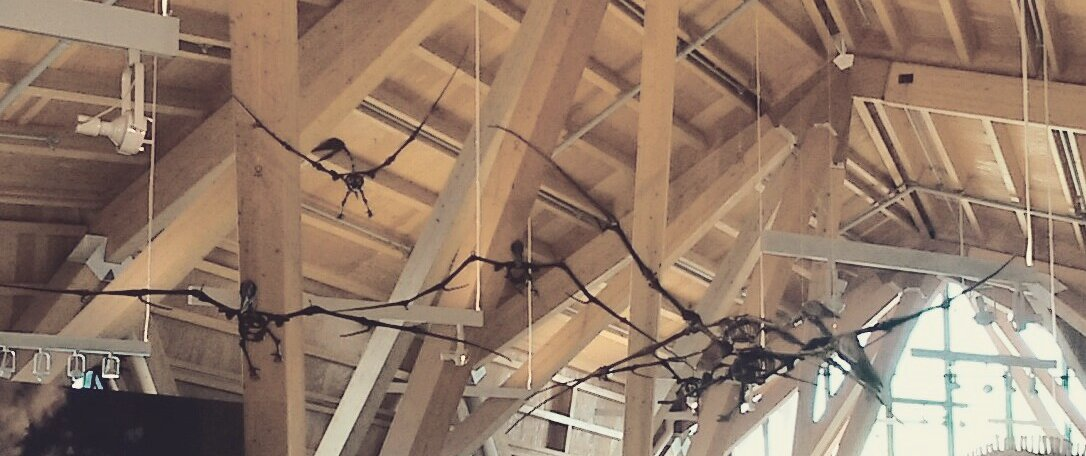
- Mounted fossilized skeletons of the Late Cretaceous pterosaur Montanazhdarcho
  †Montanazhdarcho – type locality for genus
  - †Montanazhdarcho minor – type locality for species
- †Montanoceratops
  - †Montanoceratops cerorhynchus – type locality for species
- †Montanoolithus – type locality for genus
- †Mosasaurus
  - †Mosasaurus missouriensis
- †Myledaphus
  - †Myledaphus bipartitus
- †Mytilus
- †Nanotyrannus
  - †Nanotyrannus lancensis – type locality for species
- †Naomichelys – type locality for genus
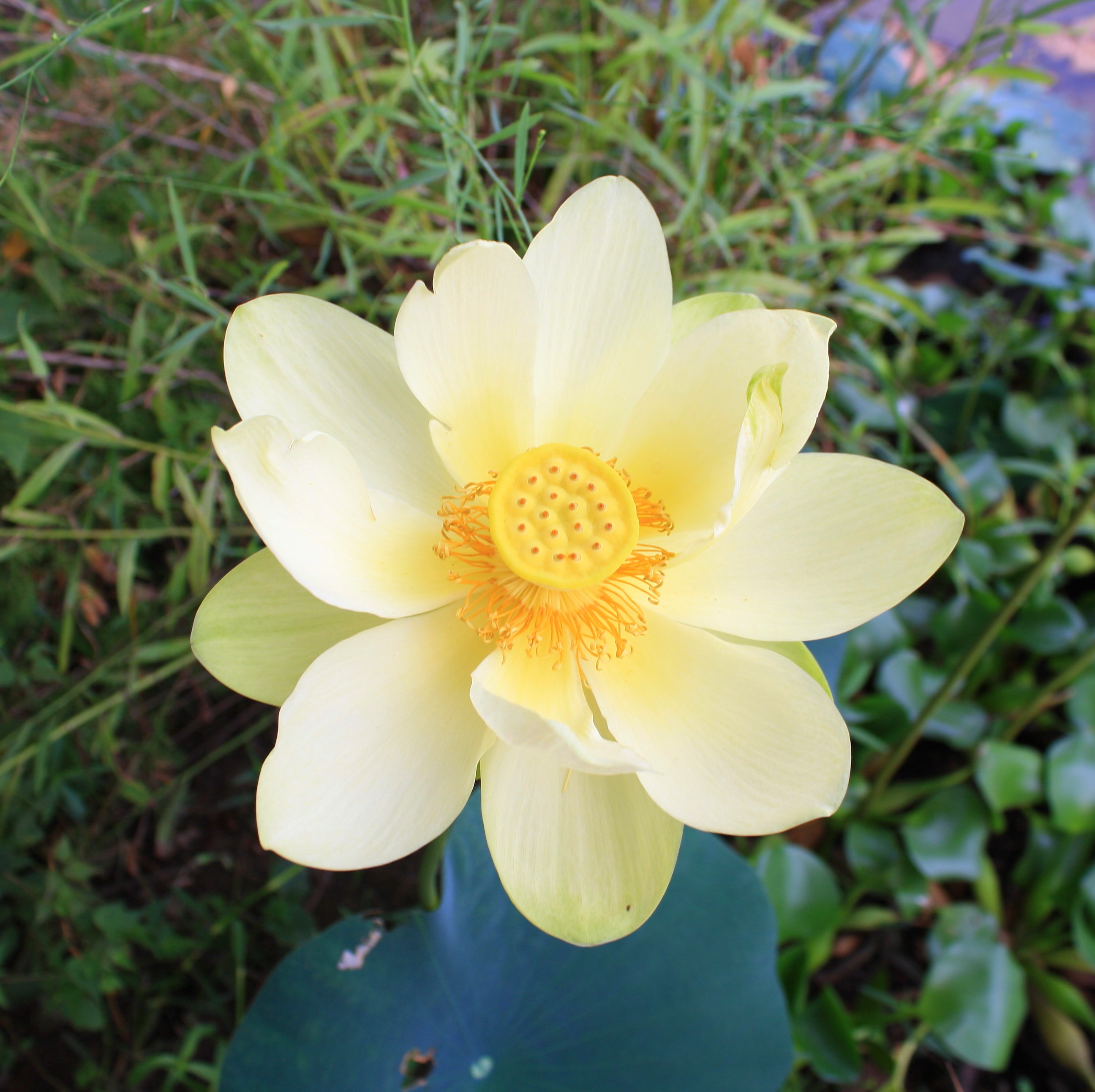
- A living Nelumbo lotus
  †Nelumbo
- †Neocardioceras
  - †Neocardioceras juddii
  - †Neocardioceras minutum
- †Neoplagiaulax
  - †Neoplagiaulax burgessi – type locality for species
- †Nezpercius – type locality for genus
- †Nidimys – type locality for genus
- †Normannites – tentative report
- †Notogoneus
- Nucula
- †Obamadon – type locality for genus
  - †Obamadon gracilis – type locality for species
- †Odaxosaurus
  - †Odaxosaurus piger
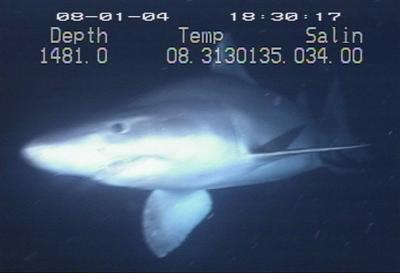
- A living Odontaspis sand shark
  Odontaspis
  - †Odontaspis sanguinei – type locality for species
- †Oklatheridium
- †Onchosaurus
- †Oohkotokia – type locality for genus
  - †Oohkotokia horneri – type locality for species
- †Ophiomorpha
- †Opisthotriton
- †Ornithomimus
  - †Ornithomimus grandis – type locality for species
  - †Ornithomimus tenuis – type locality for species
- †Orodromeus – type locality for genus
  - †Orodromeus makelai – type locality for species
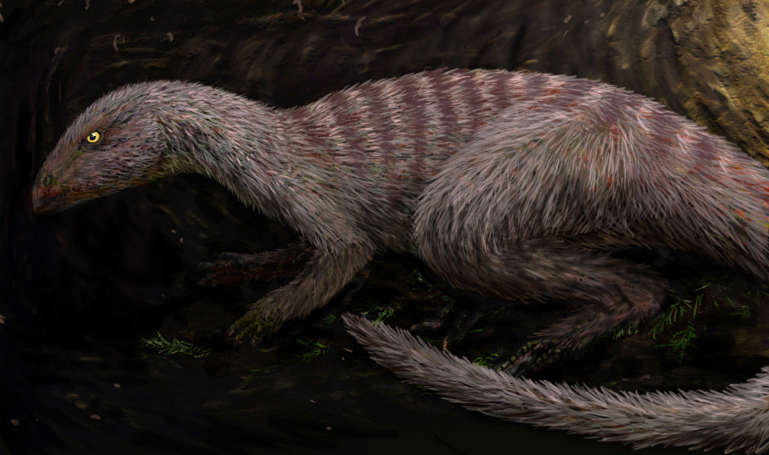
- Life restoration of the Late Cretaceous herbivorous dinosaur Oryctodromeus in a burrow
  †Oryctodromeus – type locality for genus
  - †Oryctodromeus cubicularis – type locality for species
- Ostrea
- †Oxytoma
- †Pachycephalosaurus – type locality for genus
  - †Pachycephalosaurus wyomingensis – type locality for species
- †Pagiophyllum
- †Palaeobatrachus
- †Palaeosaniwa
  - †Palaeosaniwa canadensis
- †Palaeoscincus – type locality for genus
  - †Palaeoscincus costatus – type locality for species
- †Palatobaena
- †Paleopsephurus – type locality for genus
  - †Paleopsephurus wilsoni – type locality for species
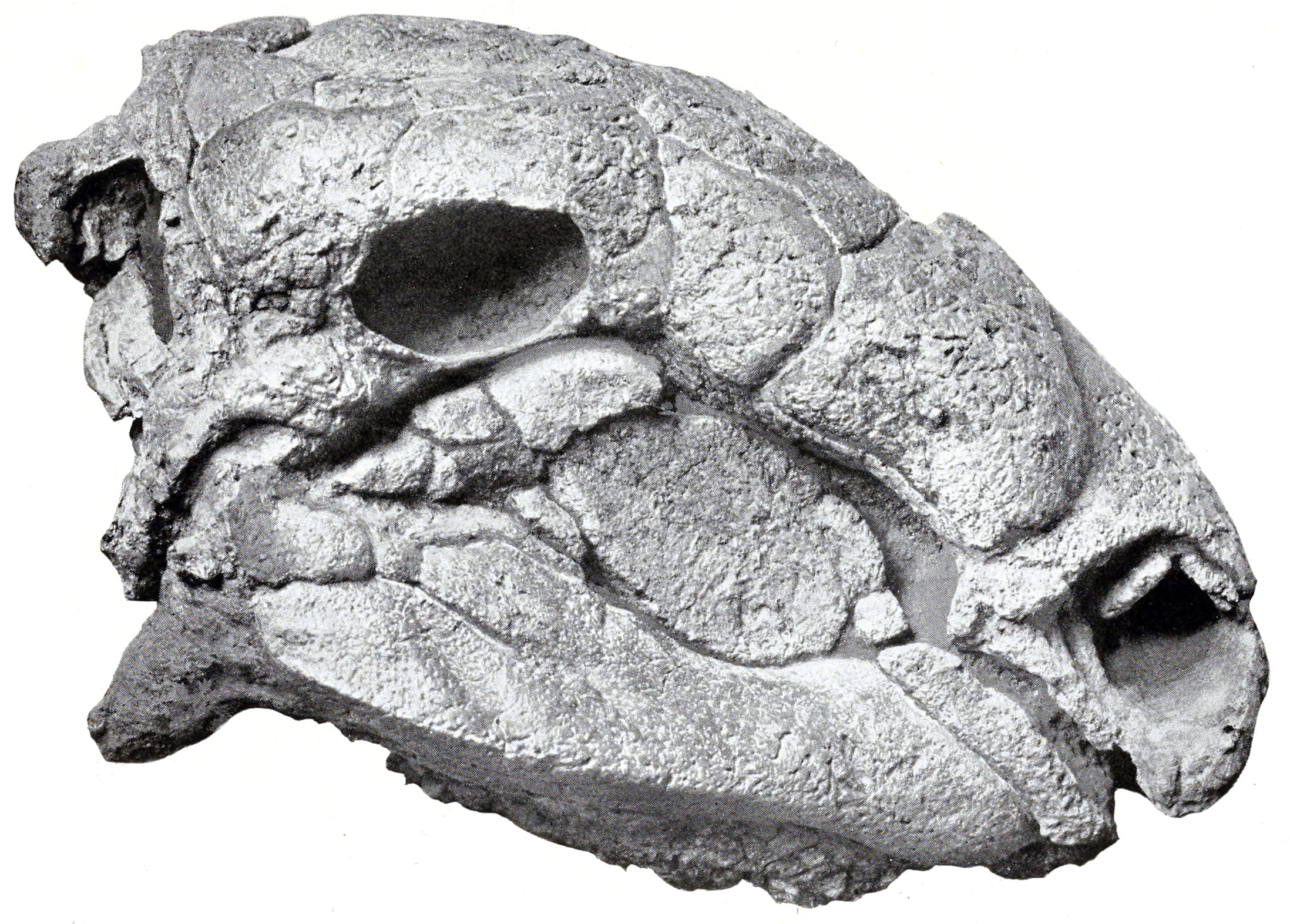
- Illustration of a fossilized skull of the Late Cretaceous armored dinosaur Panoplosaurus
  †Panoplosaurus
- †Pappotherium
- †Paracimexomys
  - †Paracimexomys judithae – type locality for species
  - †Paracimexomys magnus – type locality for species
  - †Paracimexomys priscus
  - †Paracimexomys propriscus – type locality for species
  - †Paracimexomys robisoni – or unidentified comparable form
- †Paralbula
- †Paramacellodus – or unidentified comparable form
- †Paranecturus – type locality for genus
  - †Paranecturus garbanii – type locality for species
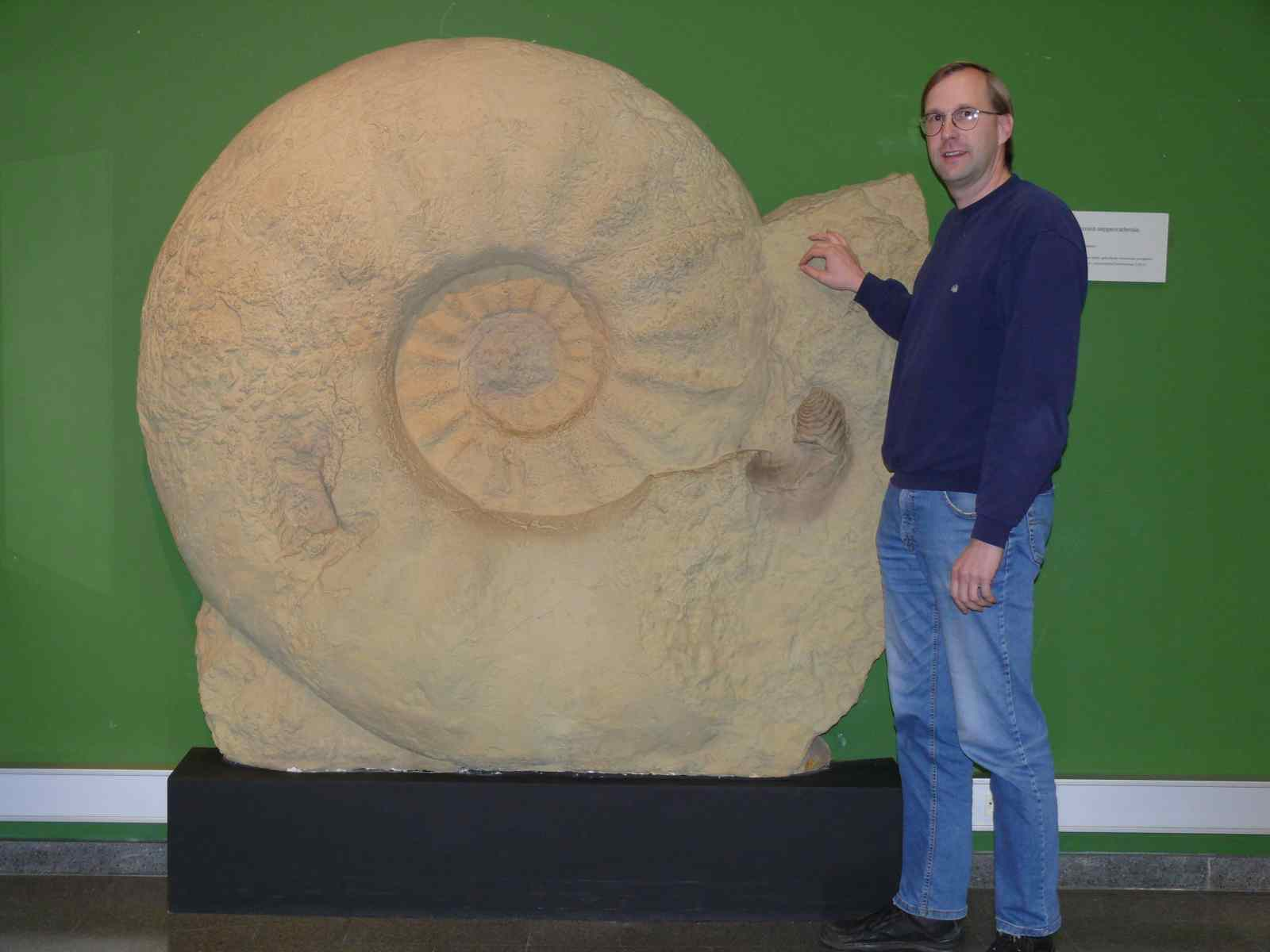
- Fossilized shell of the Late Cretaceous ammonoid cephalopod Parapuzosia with a human indicating its size
  †Parapuzosia
  - †Parapuzosia bradyi – type locality for species
- †Paronychodon
  - †Paronychodon lacustris
- †Pectinodon – or unidentified comparable form
- Pholadomya
  - †Pholadomya kingi
- Physa
- †Piceoerpeton
- †Piksi – type locality for genus
  - †Piksi barbarulna – type locality for species
- †Pinna
- †Pistia
- †Plesiobaena
- †Pleuronautilus
- †Prenoceratops – type locality for genus
  - †Prenoceratops pieganensis – type locality for species
- †Prismatoolithus
- †Proamphiuma
- †Prodesmodon
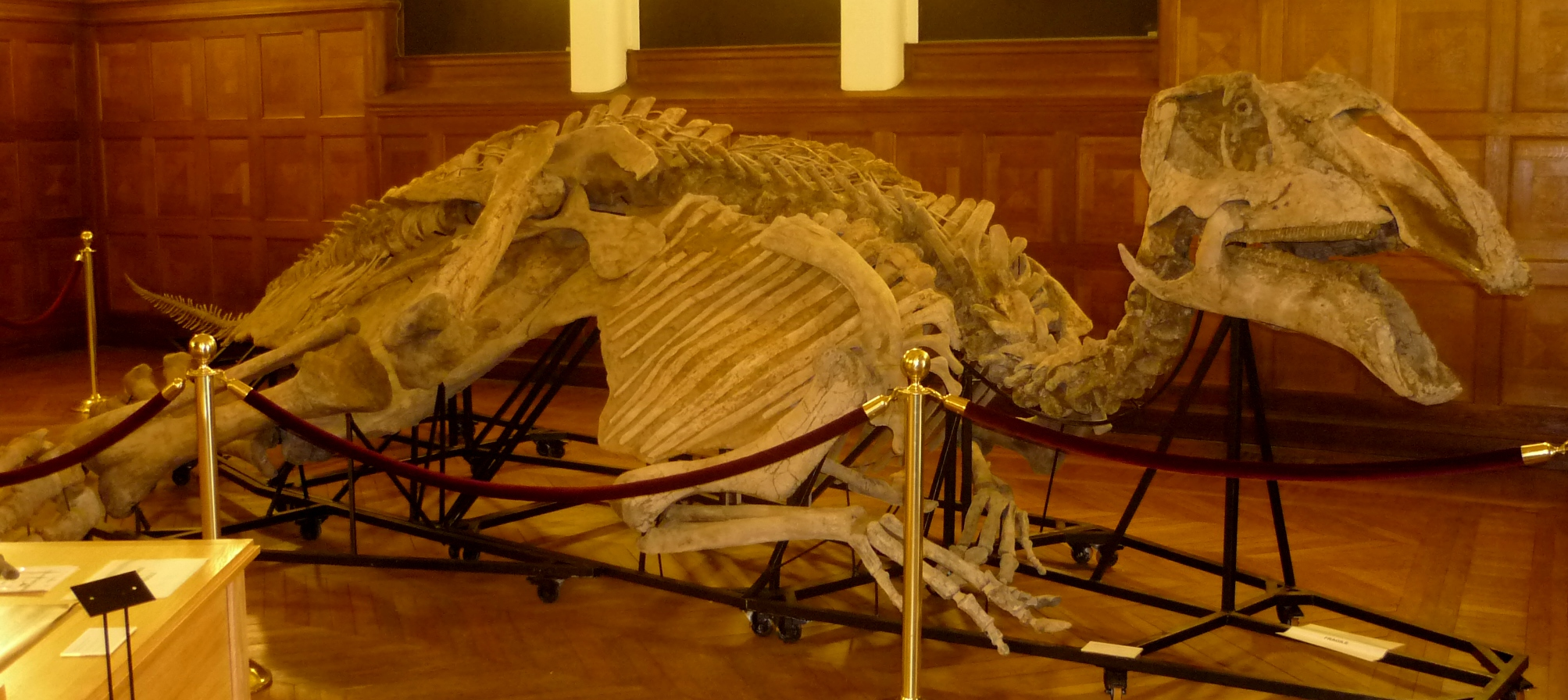
- Mounted fossilized skeleton of the Late Cretaceous duck-billed dinosaur Prosaurolophus
  †Prosaurolophus
  - †Prosaurolophus blackfeetensis – type locality for species
- †Protocardia
- †Protoscaphirhynchus – type locality for genus
- †Protungulatum
- †Pseudomelania
- †Pteria – tentative report
- †Pteropelyx – type locality for genus
  - †Pteropelyx grallipes – type locality for species
- †Ptychotrygon
  - †Ptychotrygon blainensis – type locality for species
  - †Ptychotrygon triangularis
- Pycnodonte
- Quercus – report made of unidentified related form or using admittedly obsolete nomenclature
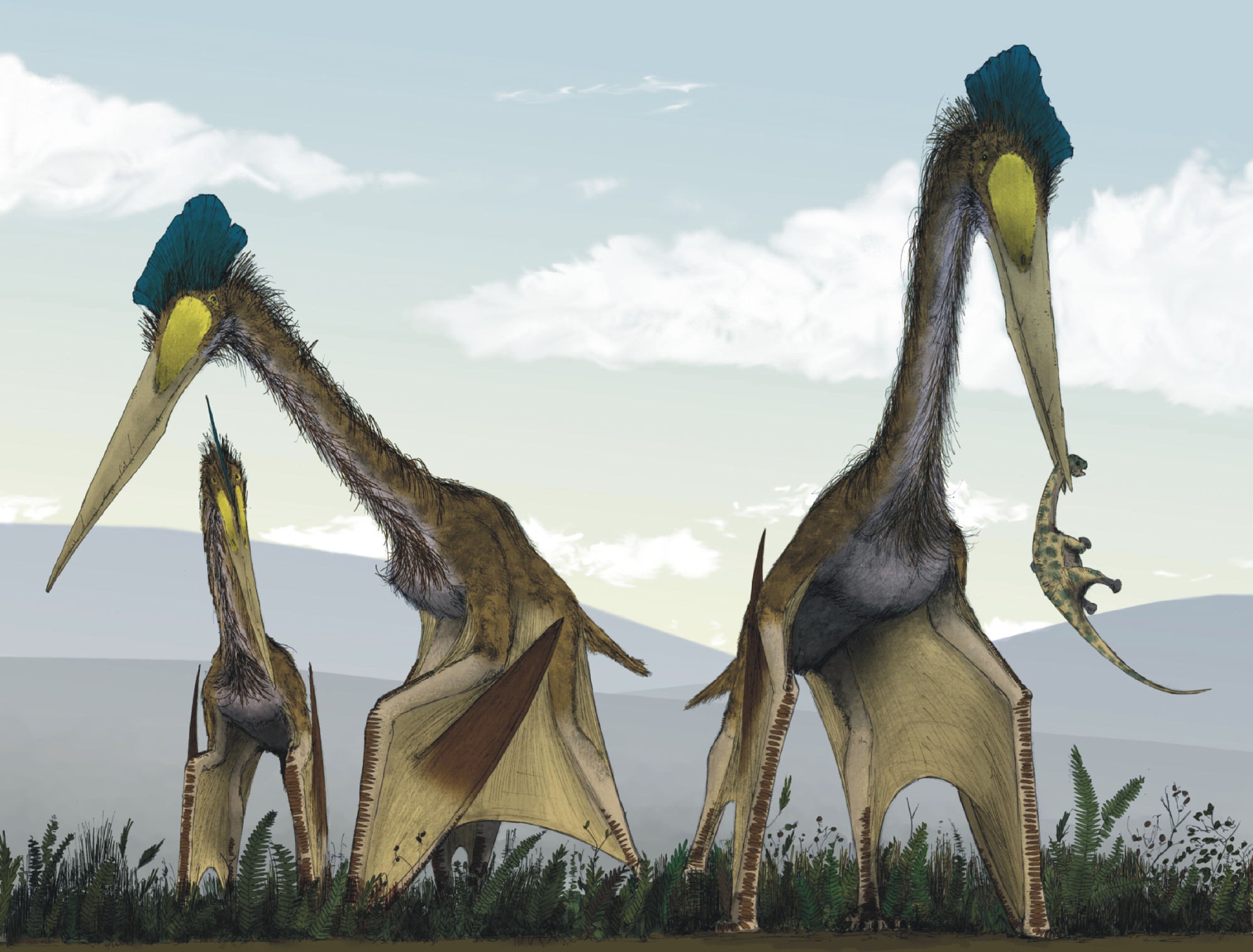
- Life restoration of a flock of the Late Cretaceous pterosaur Quetzalcoatlus feeding on the ground
  †Quetzalcoatlus – or unidentified comparable form
- †Rhamnus – report made of unidentified related form or using admittedly obsolete nomenclature
- †Richardoestesia
  - †Richardoestesia gilmorei
  - †Richardoestesia isosceles
- †Rubeosaurus
  - †Rubeosaurus ovatus – type locality for species
- †Rugocaudia – type locality for genus
  - †Rugocaudia cooneyi – type locality for species
- †Sagenopteris
  - †Sagenopteris elliptica
  - †Sagenopteris mclearni
  - †Sagenopteris williamsii
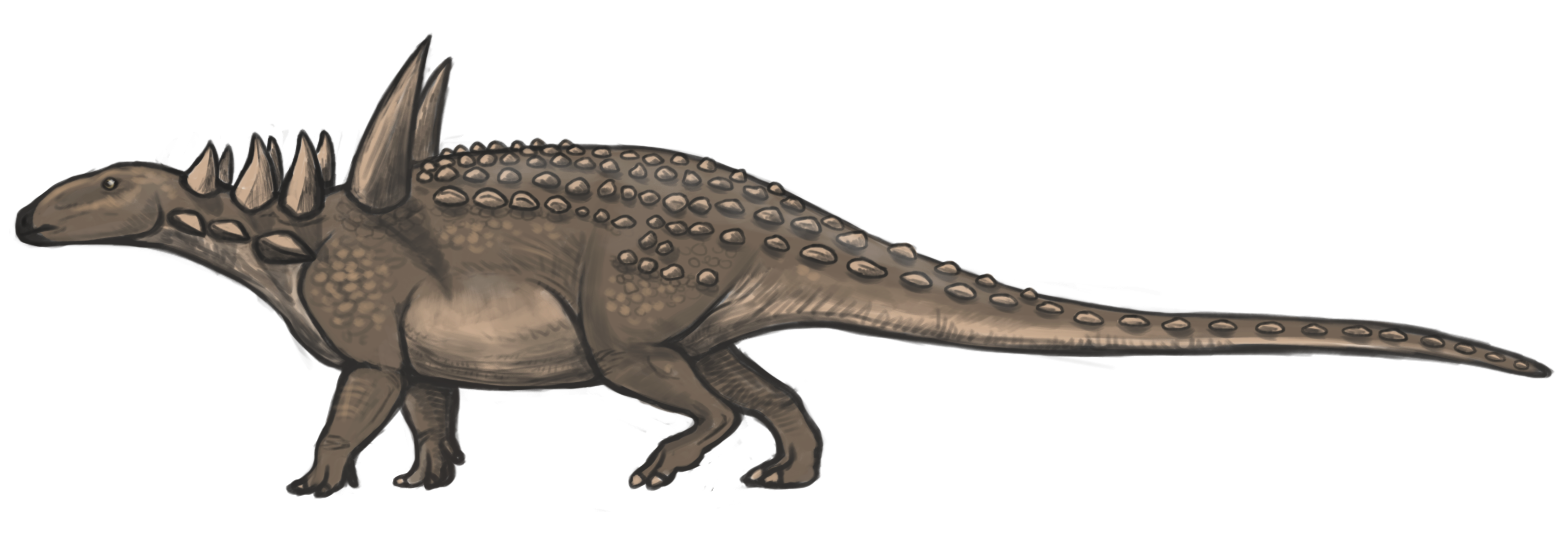
- Life restoration of the Early Cretaceous armored dinosaurs Sauropelta
  †Sauropelta – type locality for genus
  - †Sauropelta edwardsorum – type locality for species
- †Saurornitholestes
  - †Saurornitholestes langstoni
- †Scapherpeton
- †Scaphites
  - †Scaphites impendicostatus
  - †Scaphites preventricosus
  - †Scaphites ventricosus
- †Scolosaurus
  - †Scolosaurus cutleri
- †Scotiophryne – type locality for genus
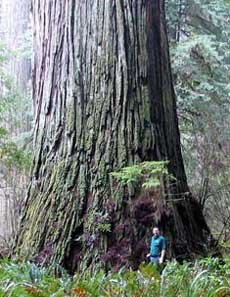
- Base of the trunk of a living Sequoia tree with a human to scale
  †Sequoia
- Sphaerium
- †Sphaerotholus
  - †Sphaerotholus buchholtzae – type locality for species
- †Sphenopteris
  - †Sphenopteris brulensis
  - †Sphenopteris geopperti
  - †Sphenopteris latiloba
  - †Sphenopteris mclearni
- †Spheroolithus
  - †Spheroolithus albertensis
  - †Spheroolithus choteauensis – type locality for species
  - †Spheroolithus maiasauroides
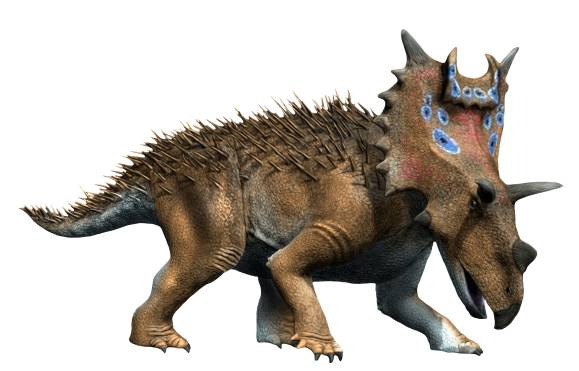
- Restoration of the Late Cretaceous horned dinosaur Spiclypeus
  †Spiclypeus – type locality for genus
  - †Spiclypeus shipporum – type locality for species
- †Spiriferina – report made of unidentified related form or using admittedly obsolete nomenclature
- Squalicorax
  - †Squalicorax kaupi
  - †Squalicorax pristodontus
- †Squatirhina
  - †Squatirhina americana
- †Stegoceras
  - †Stegoceras validum
- †Stegosaurus
- †Suuwassea – type locality for genus
  - †Suuwassea emilieae – type locality for species
- †Tatankacephalus – type locality for genus
  - †Tatankacephalus cooneyorum – type locality for species
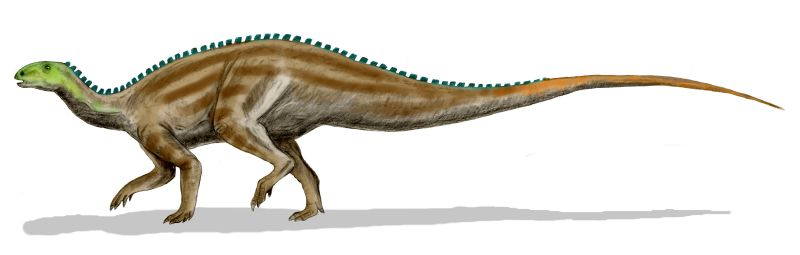
- Life restoration of the Early Cretaceous Iguanodon relative Tenontosaurus
  †Tenontosaurus – type locality for genus
  - †Tenontosaurus tilletti – type locality for species
- †Terminonaris – type locality for genus
  - †Terminonaris robusta – type locality for species
- †Thalassomedon – type locality for genus
  - †Thalassomedon hanningtoni – type locality for species
- †Thescelosaurus
  - †Thescelosaurus garbanii – type locality for species
  - †Thescelosaurus neglectus
- †Toxolophosaurus – type locality for genus
- †Trachodon – type locality for genus
  - †Trachodon altidens
  - †Trachodon marginatus
  - †Trachodon mirabilis – type locality for species
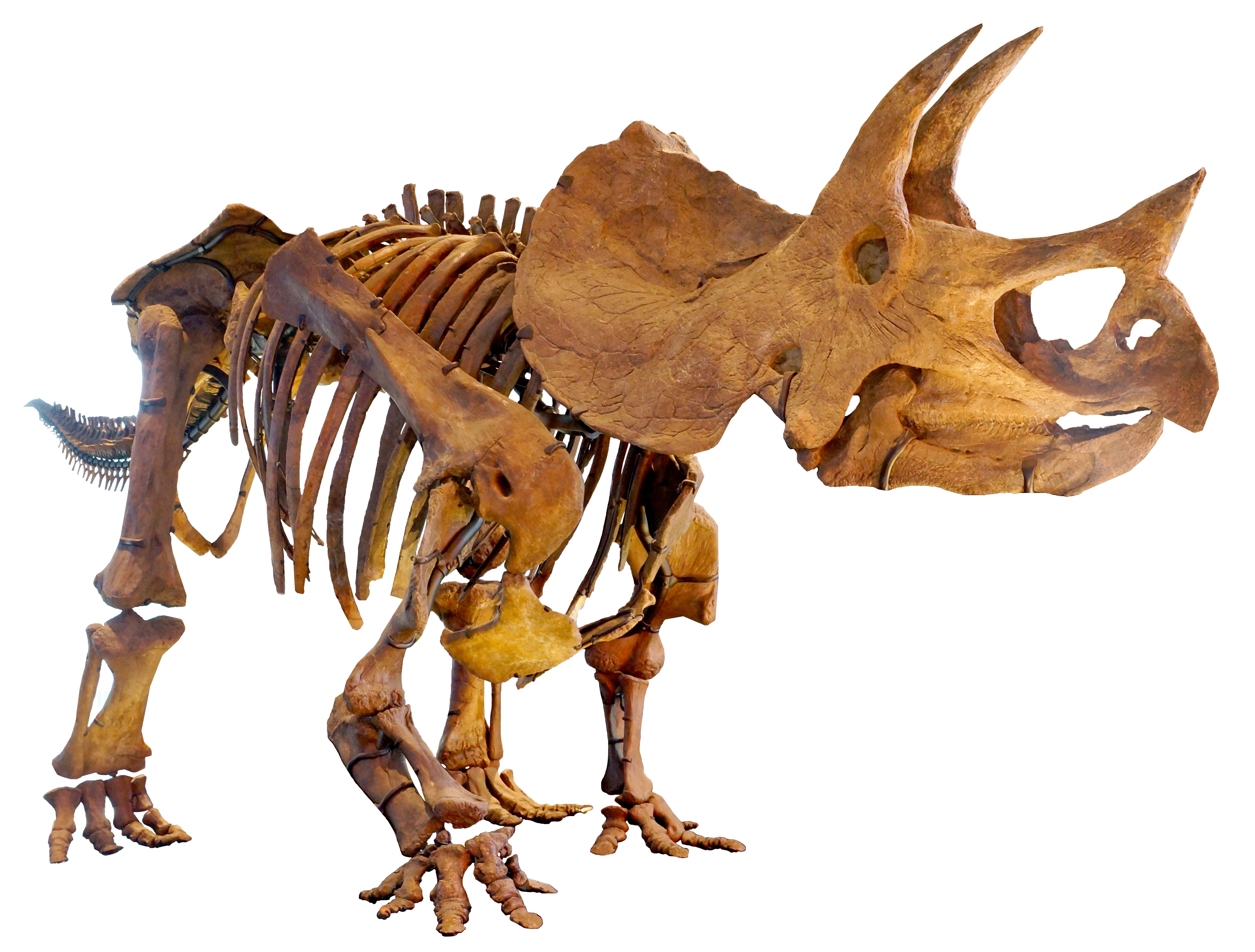
- Mounted fossilized skeleton of the Late Cretaceous horned dinosaur Triceratops
  †Triceratops
  - †Triceratops horridus
  - †Triceratops maximus – type locality for species
  - †Triceratops prorsus
- †Trigonia
  - †Trigonia montanaensis
- Trionyx
- †Triprismatoolithus – type locality for genus
- †Troodon – type locality for genus
  - †Troodon formosus – type locality for species
- †Tubercuoolithus – type locality for genus
- Turritella
- †Tylosaurus
  - †Tylosaurus proriger
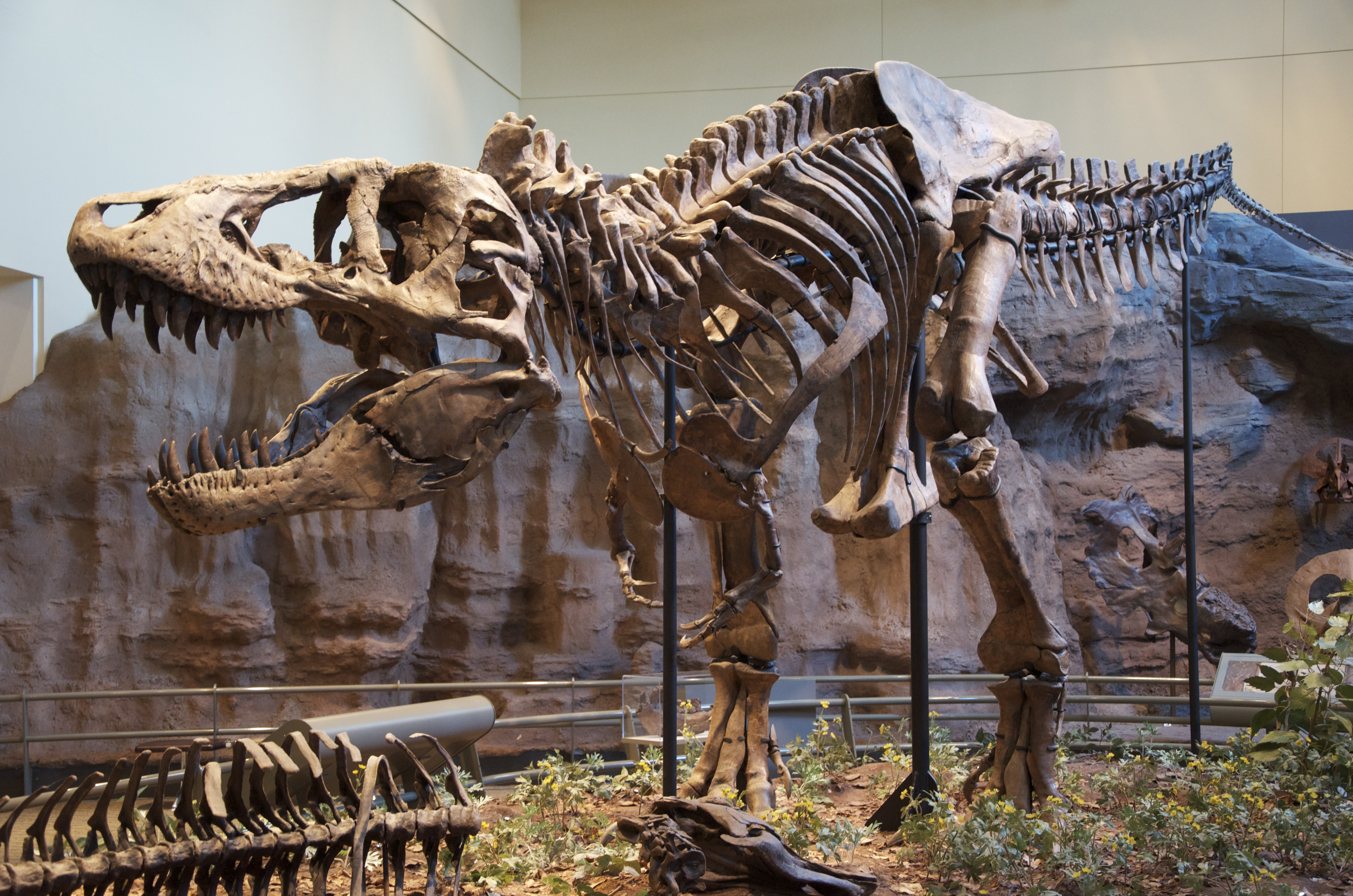
- Fossilized skeleton of the Late Cretaceous tyrannosaur Tyrannosaurus
  †Tyrannosaurus – type locality for genus
  - †Tyrannosaurus rex – type locality for species
- †Ugrosaurus – type locality for genus
  - †Ugrosaurus olsoni – type locality for species
- Unio
- †Valenopsalis
- Valvata – tentative report
- Vitis – report made of unidentified related form or using admittedly obsolete nomenclature
- Viviparus
- †Volviceramus
- †Woodwardia – report made of unidentified related form or using admittedly obsolete nomenclature
- †Xenocephalites – tentative report
- Xenophora
- †Yezoites
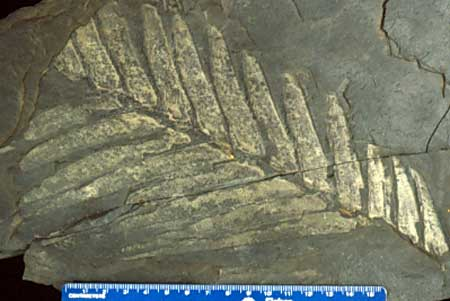
- Fossil of the Early Triassic-Eocene cycad-like frond Zamites
  †Zamites
  - †Zamites arcticus
- †Zapsalis – or unidentified comparable form
- †Zephyrosaurus – type locality for genus
  - †Zephyrosaurus schaffi – type locality for species

== Cenozoic ==
=== Selected Cenozoic taxa of Montana ===
- Abies
- Abies
- Acer
- †Acheronodon
  - †Acheronodon garbani – type locality for species
- Acipenser
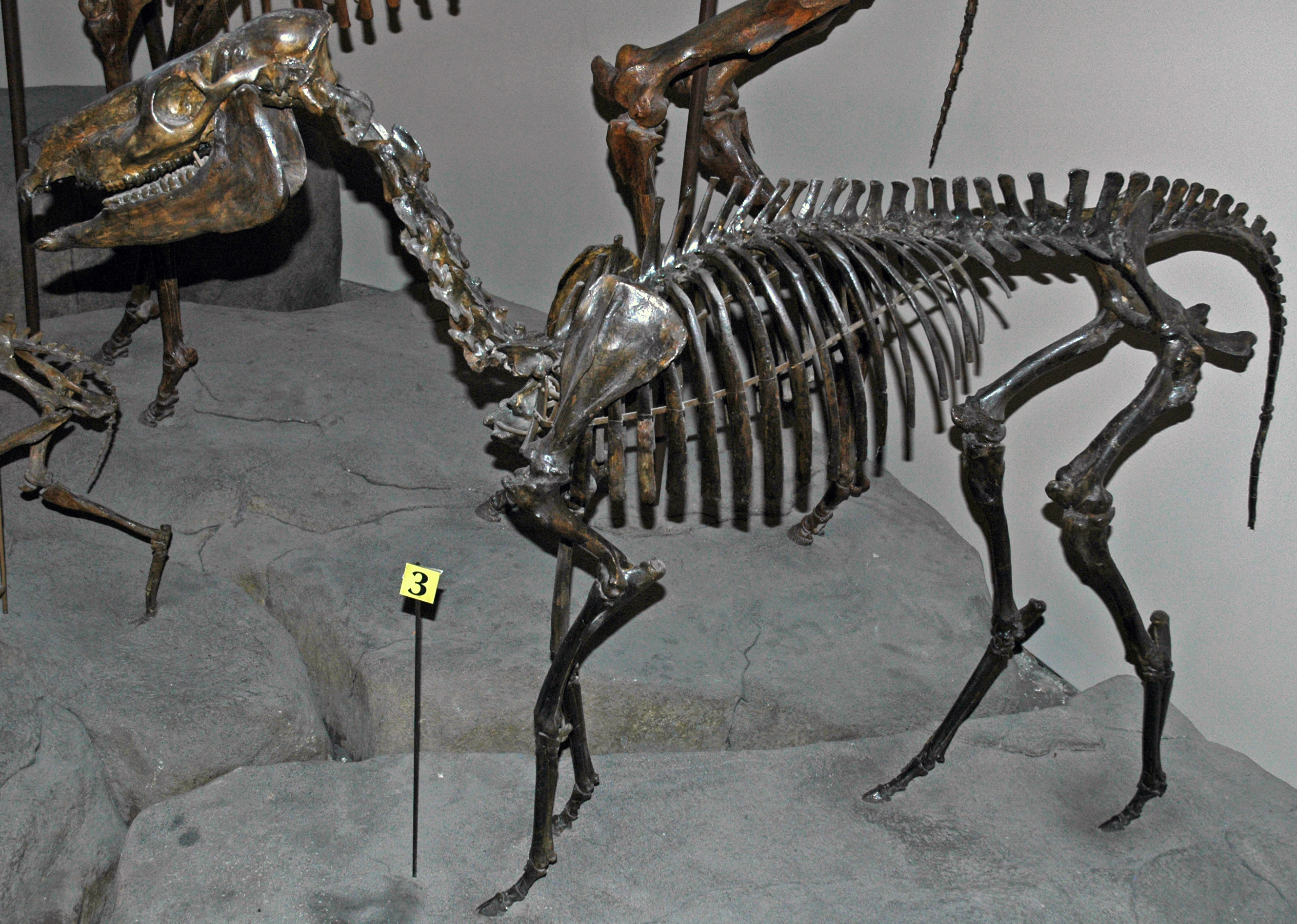
- Mounted fossilized skeleton of the Miocene horse Acritohippus
  †Acritohippus
  - †Acritohippus isonesus
- †Aelurodon
- †Aepycamelus
  - †Aepycamelus stocki
- †Agnotocastor
- †Agriochoerus
- †Agrostis
- †Ailanthus
- Alangium
- Alnus
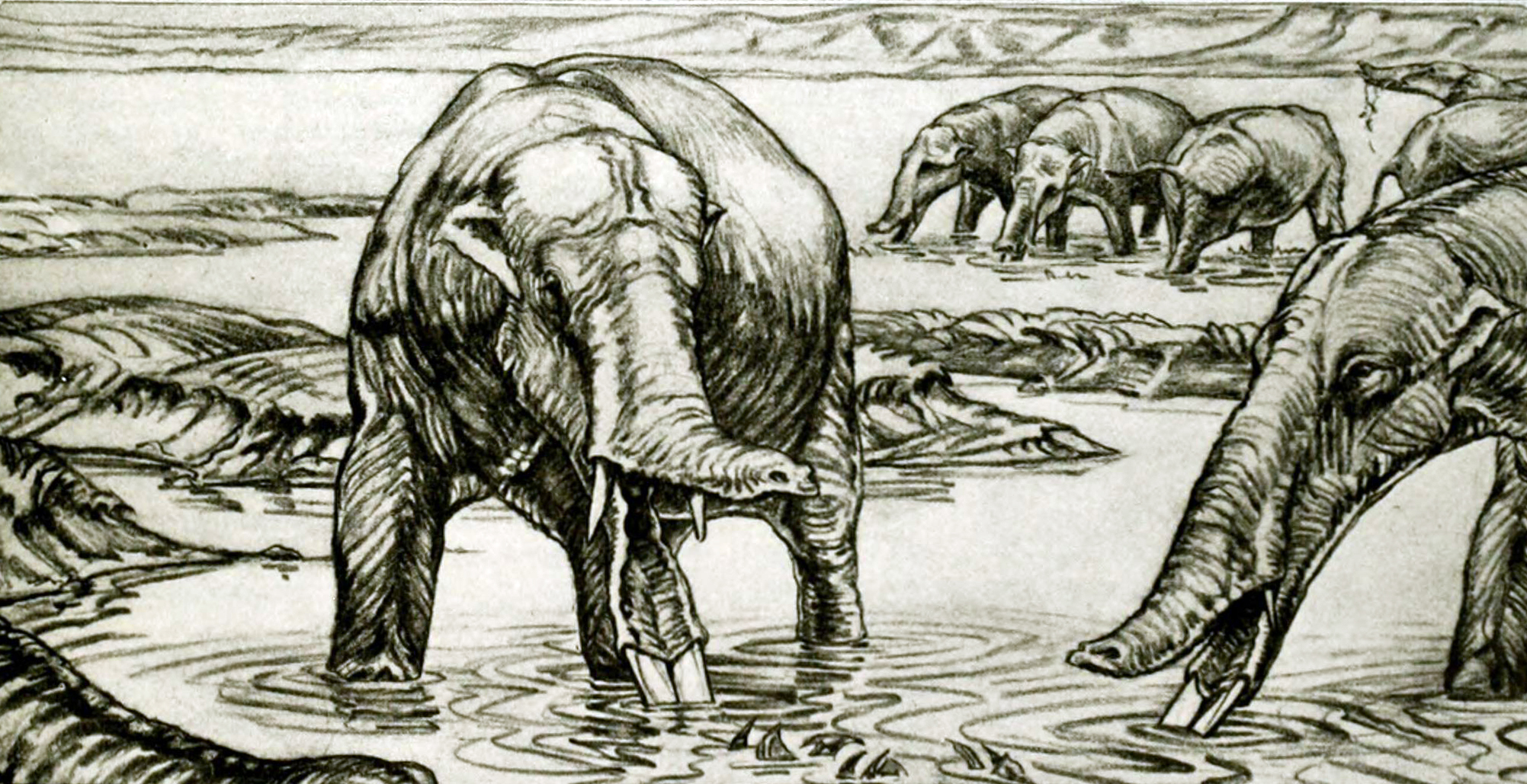
- Life restoration of the Miocene elephant relative Amebelodon. Margret Flinsch (1932).
  †Amebelodon
- Amelanchier
- †Amentotaxus
- Amia
- †Ampelopsis
- †Amphechinus
- †Amphicyon
- †Amyzon
- Anas
  - †Anas platyrhynchos – or unidentified comparable form
- †Anconodon
- †Anemia
- †Angustidens
- Antilocapra – or unidentified comparable form
  - †Antilocapra americana
- †Aphelops
- †Araucaria
- †Archaeocyon
- †Archaeohippus
- †Arctocyon
- †Arctodus
  - †Arctodus simus
- †Arctostaphylos
- Arundo
- Arvicola
- †aspera
- †Astronium
- †Athyana
- †Avunculus
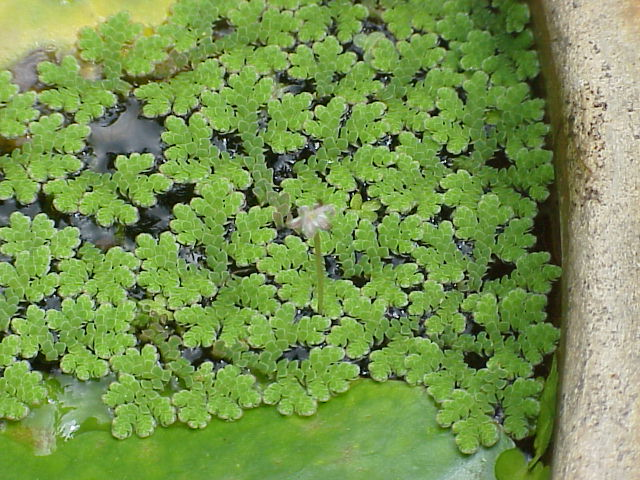
- Living Azolla water ferns
  Azolla
- †Baiotomeus
  - †Baiotomeus douglassi
  - †Baiotomeus lamberti – type locality for species
- †Bathygenys
- †Berberis
- Berchemia
- Betula
- Bibio – or unidentified related form
- Bison
  - †Bison bison
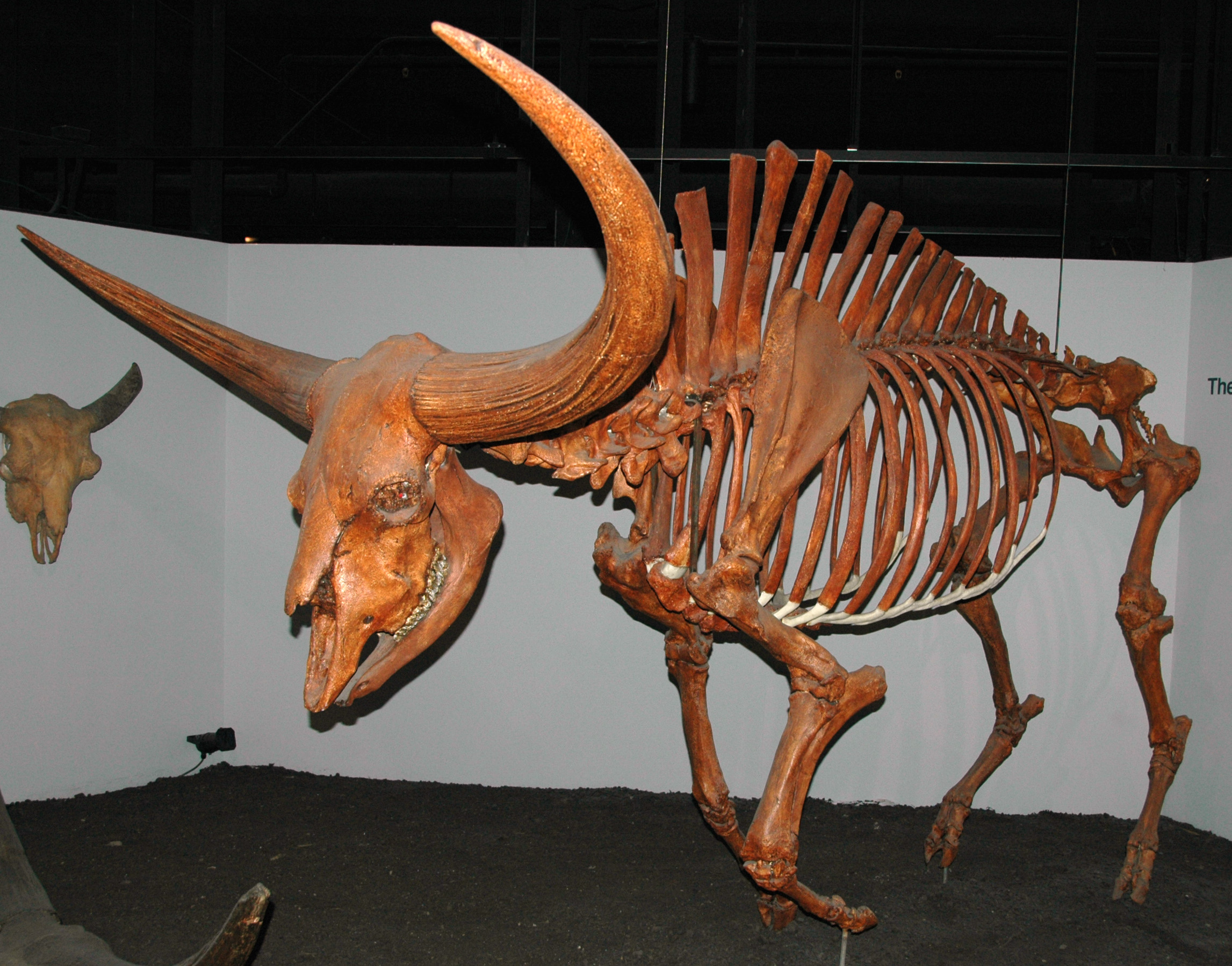
  - Mounted fossilized skeleton of the Pleistocene Bison latifrons, also known as the giant bison or long-horned bison
    †Bison latifrons – or unidentified comparable form
- †Bisonalveus
  - †Bisonalveus browni
- †Blastomeryx
  - †Blastomeryx gemmifer
- †Bootherium
- †Borealosuchus
  - †Borealosuchus sternbergii
- †Brachychampsa
- †Brachycrus
- †Brachyrhynchocyon
- †Camelops
  - †Camelops minidokae
- †Canavalia
- Canis
  - †Canis latrans
  - †Canis lupus
- †Canna
- †Cardiospermum
- Carpinus
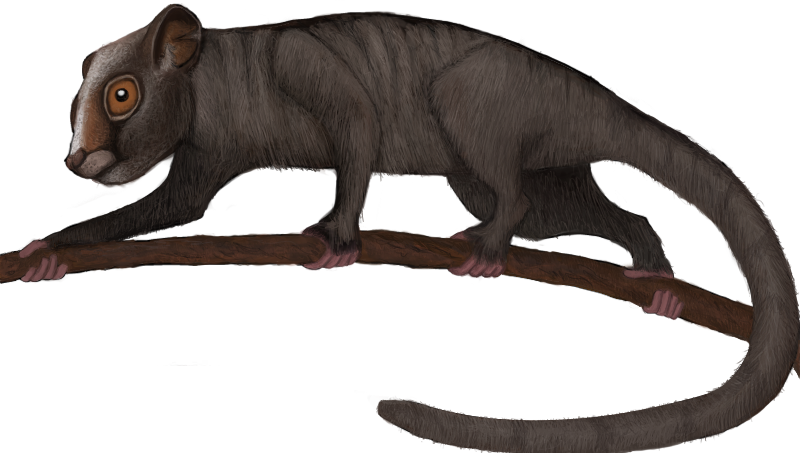
- Life restoration of the Paleocene primate relative Carpolestes
  †Carpolestes
- Carya
- †Cassia
- Castanea
- Castor
  - †Castor californicus
  - †Castor canadensis
- †Catalpa
- †Catopsalis
  - †Catopsalis alexanderi
  - †Catopsalis waddleae
- Ceanothus
- Cedrela
- †Celastrus
- Celtis
- Cercidiphyllum
- Cercis
- †Cercocarpus
- †Chamaecyparis
- †Chamops
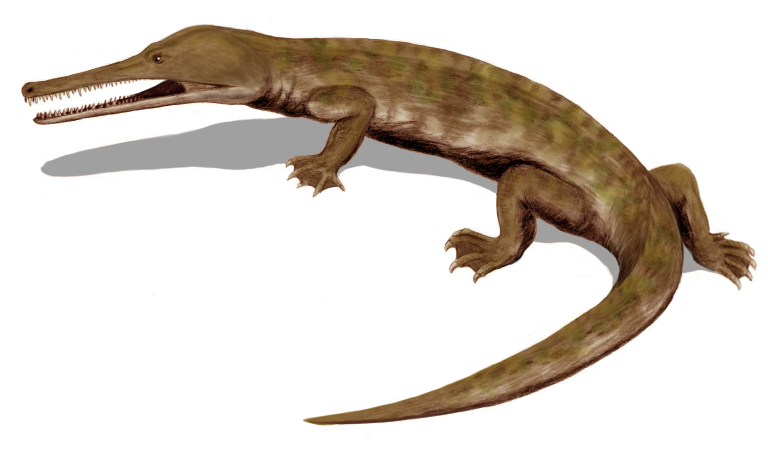
- Life restoration of the Late Cretaceous-Eocene choristoderan reptile Champsosaurus
  †Champsosaurus
- †Chisternon
- †Chriacus
  - †Chriacus calenancus
- †Chthonophis – type locality for genus
  - †Chthonophis subterraneus – type locality for species
- †Cimexomys
  - †Cimexomys minor – type locality for species
- †Cimolestes
  - †Cimolestes incisus
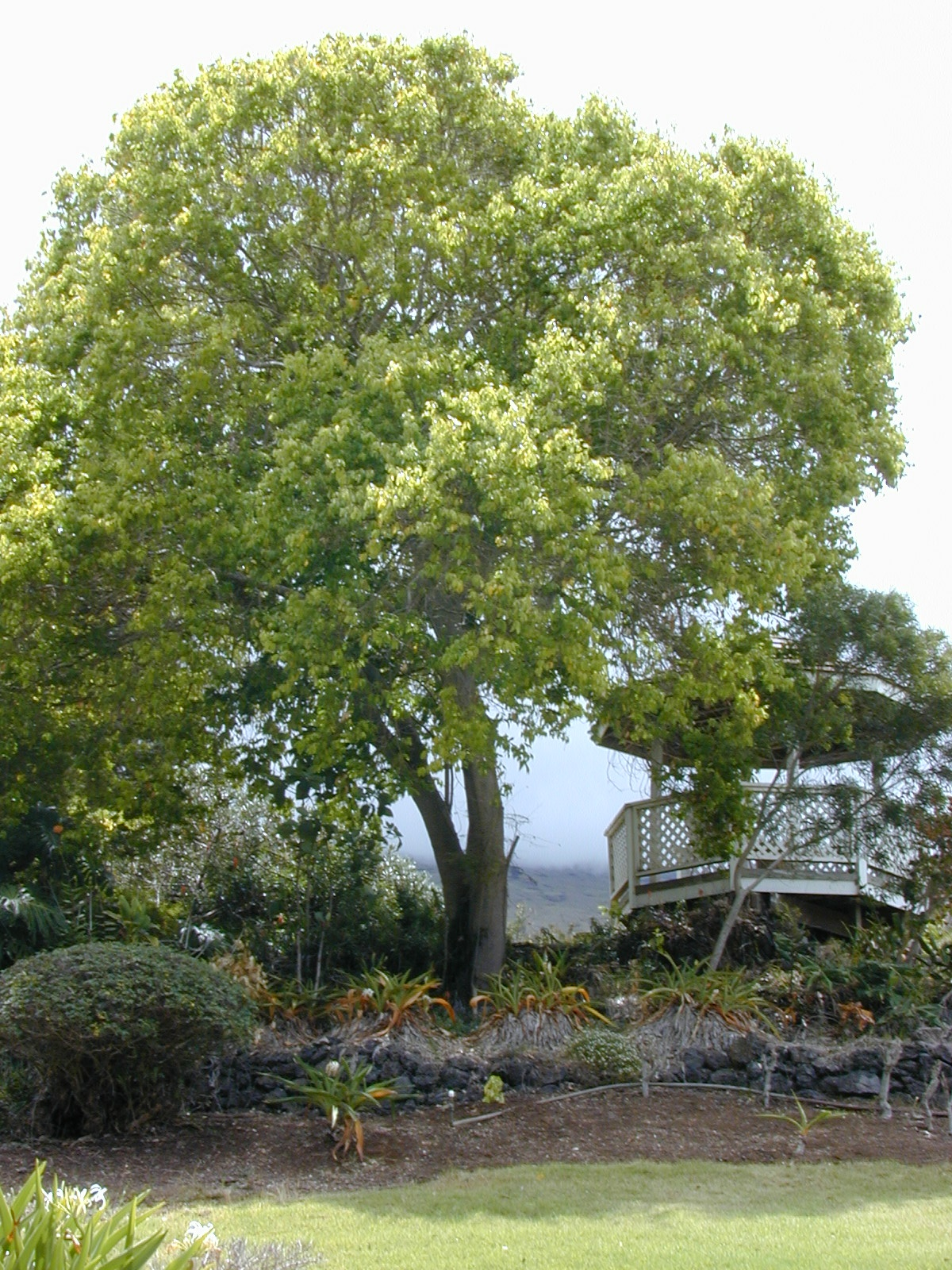
- A living Cinnamomum, or cinnamon tree
  Cinnamomum
- Cissus
- Clematis
- Cocculus
- †Colodon
- †Colubrina
  - †Colubrina asiatica – or unidentified comparable form
- †Compsemys
- †Coniophis – or unidentified comparable form
- †Conzattia
- Cornus
- †Corylus
- †Coryphodon
- †Cosoryx – tentative report
- Crataegus
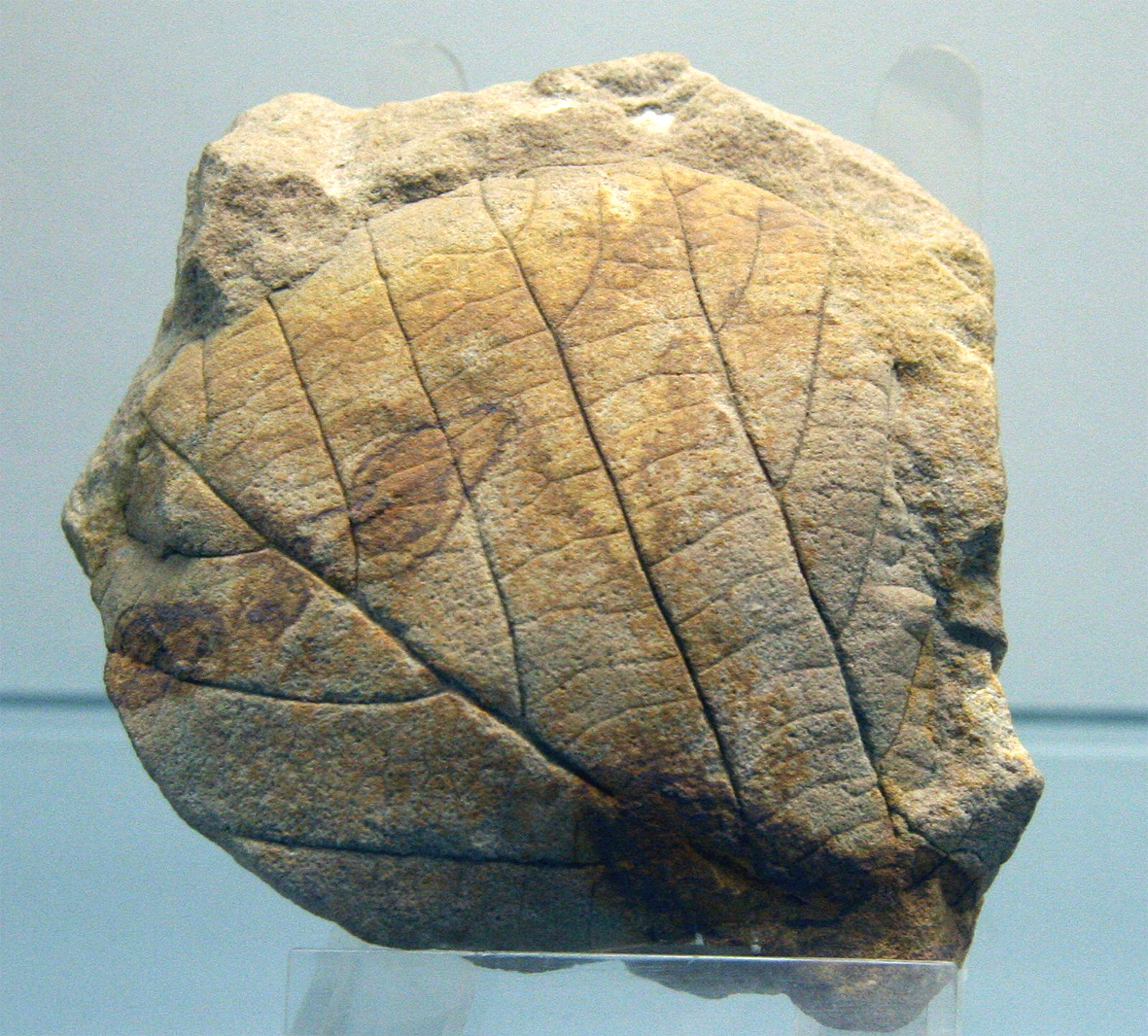
- Fossilized leaf from a Credneria tree
  †Credneria
- Crematogaster
- Culiseta
- †Cynodesmus
- Cynomys
  - †Cynomys ludovicianus
- †Dalbergia
  - †Dalbergia retusa
- †Daphoenictis – or unidentified comparable form
- †Davidia
- †Derrisemys – type locality for genus
- †Desmatochoerus
- †Diceratherium
- †Didymictis
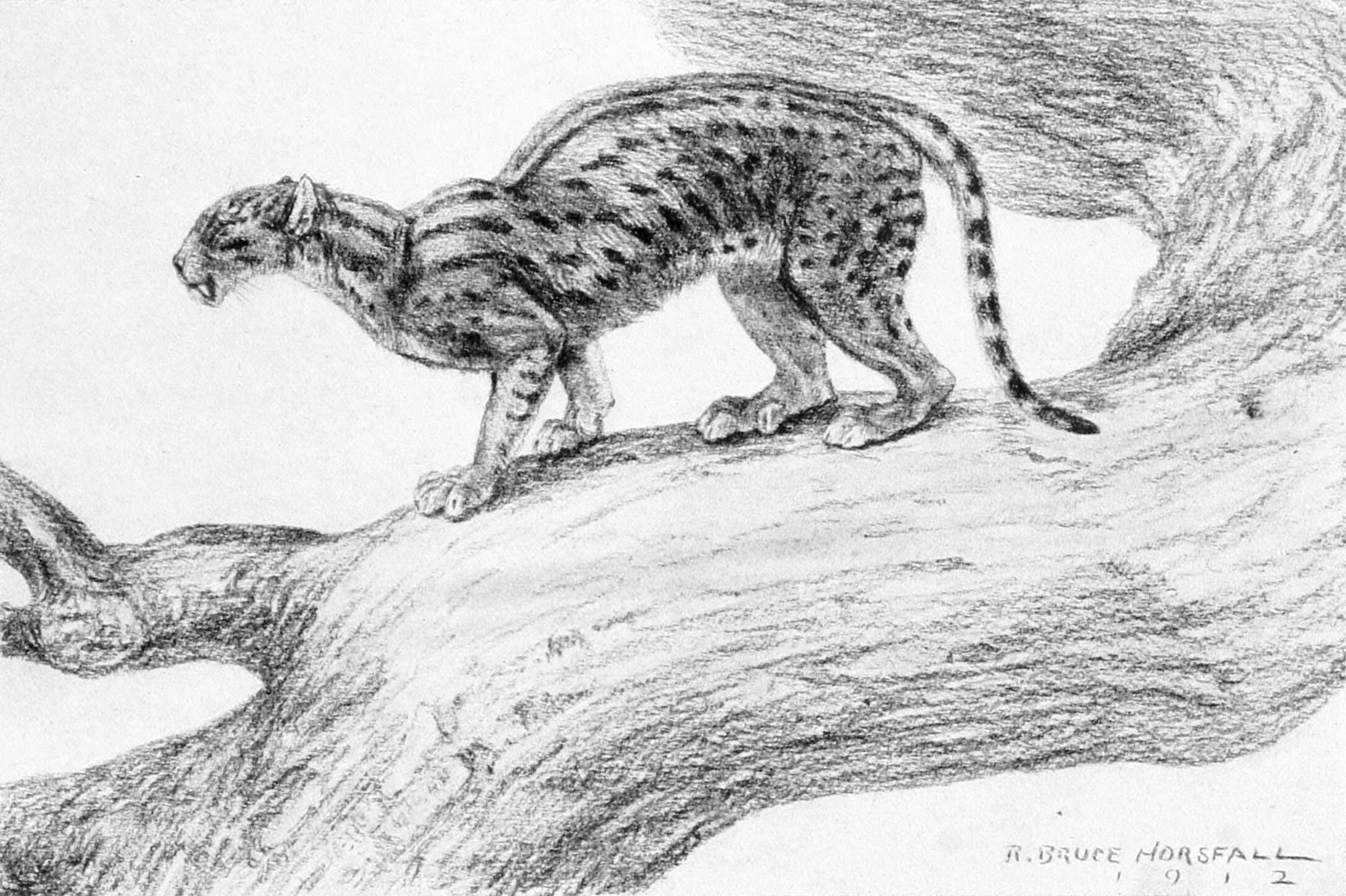
- Life restoration of the Eocene-Miocene false saber-toothed cat Dinictis. Robert Bruce Horsfall (1913).
  †Dinictis
- †Dinohippus
- †Dioctria – tentative report
- †Diospyros
- †Diphysa
- Dipteronia
- †Dissacus
- Dolichoderus
- †Domnina
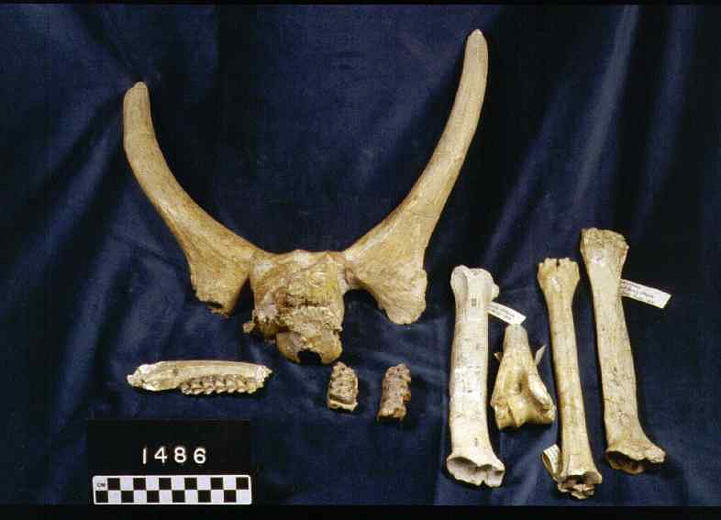
- Fossilized horns, jaws, and limb bones of the Miocene deer relative Dromomeryx
  †Dromomeryx
  - †Dromomeryx borealis
- Dryopteris
- †Ectocion
- †Elomeryx – tentative report
- †Eoconodon
  - †Eoconodon nidhoggi
- †Eotitanops
- †Epicyon
  - †Epicyon haydeni
- †Epihippus
- †Equisetum
- Equus
  - †Equus conversidens – or unidentified comparable form
- †Eucastor
- †Eucommia
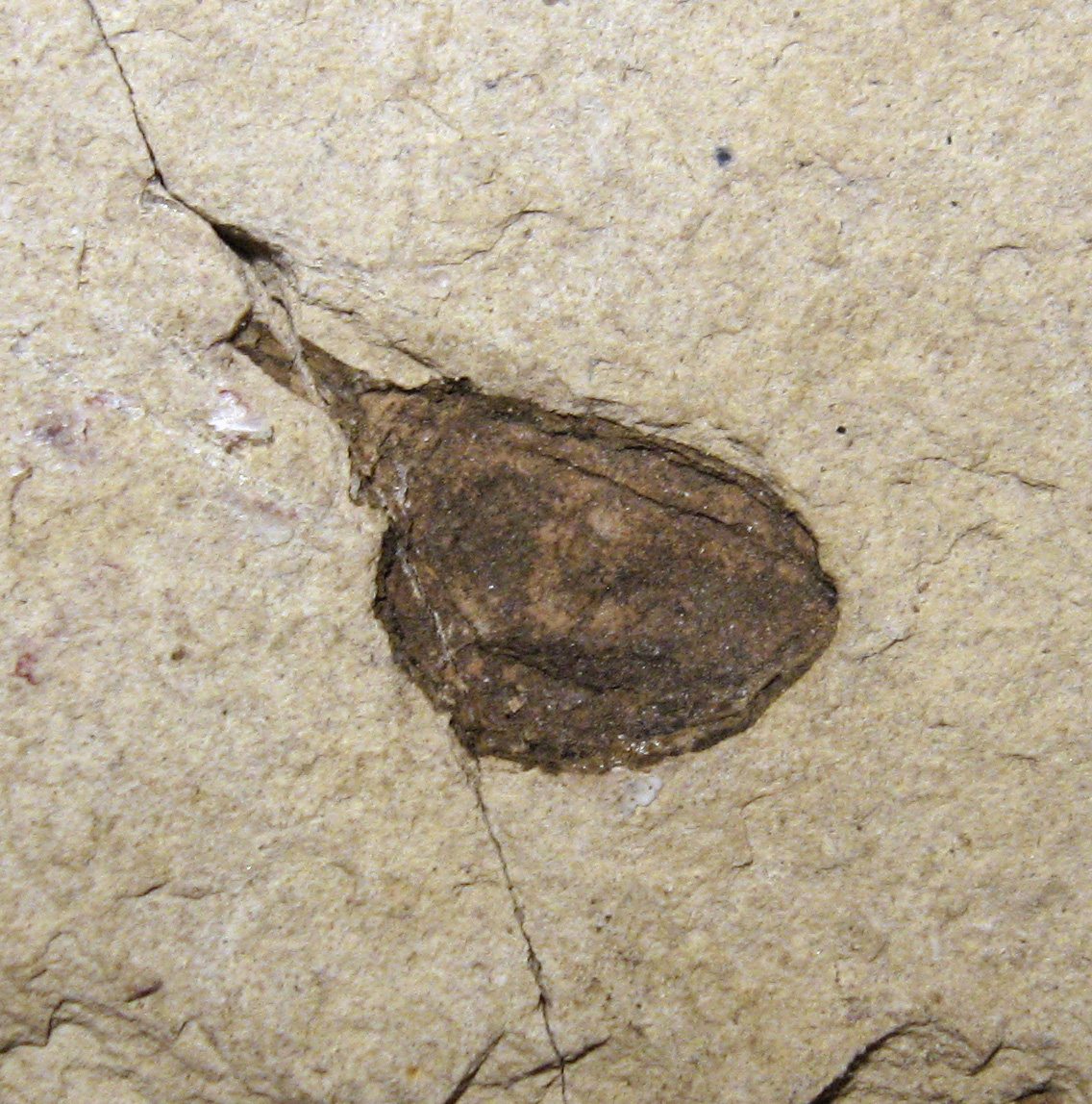
  - Fossilized fruit of the Eocene Eucommia montana plant
    †Eucommia montana
- †Euonymus
- †Euoplocyon
- Exbucklandia
- Ficus
- Fokienia
- Formica
- †Fraxinus
- Geochelone
- Gerrhonotus – or unidentified comparable form
- Ginkgo
  - †Ginkgo adiantoides
- Gleichenia
- Glyptostrobus
- †Goniacodon
- †Habrosaurus
  - †Habrosaurus dilatus
- †Helaletes
- Helius
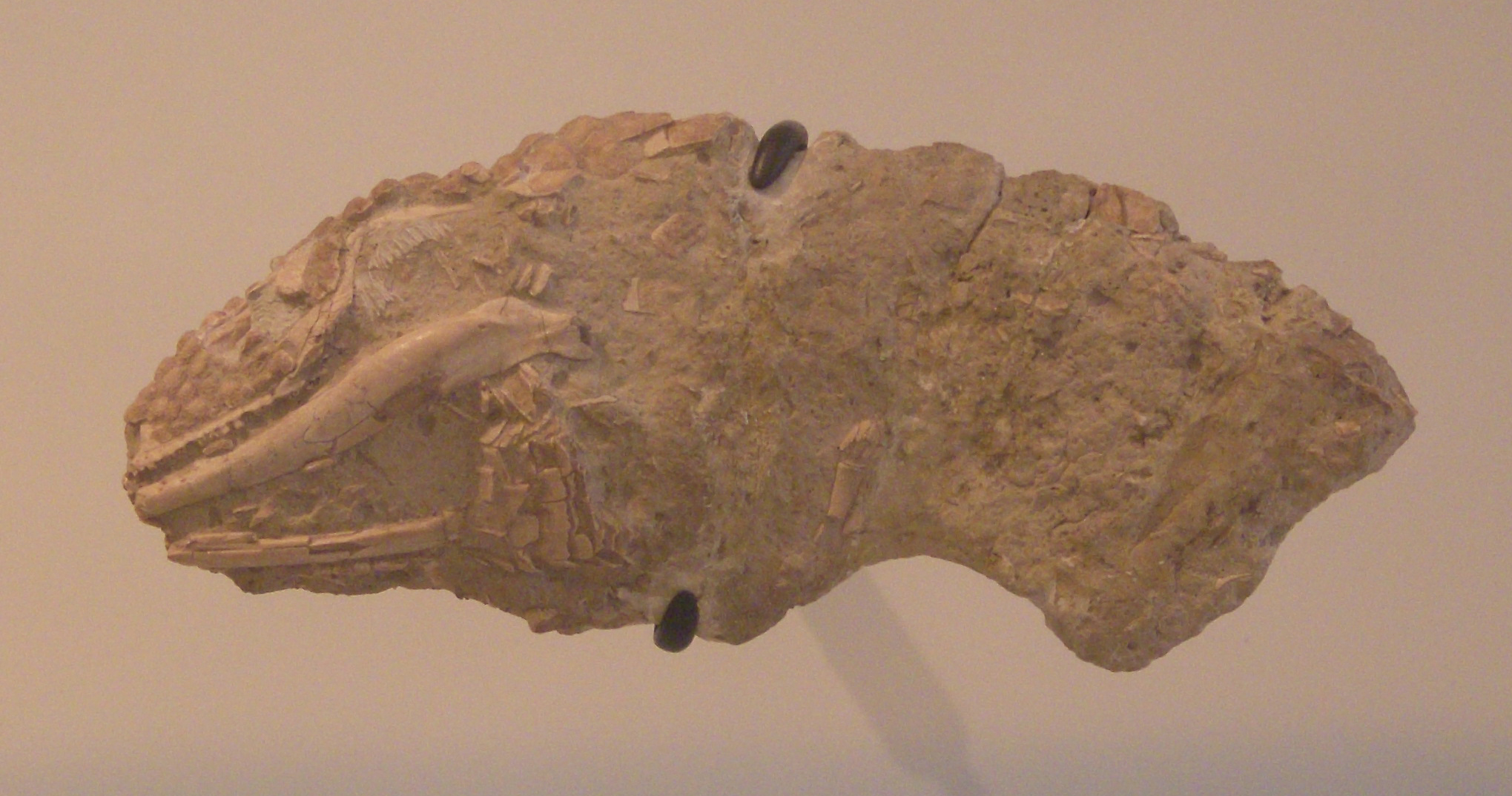
- Fossilized skull of the Oligocene lizard Helodermoides
  †Helodermoides – type locality for genus
  - †Helodermoides tuberculatus – type locality for species
- †Herpetotherium
  - †Herpetotherium fugax
  - †Herpetotherium knighti – or unidentified comparable form
- †Hesperocyon
- †Heteraletes
- †Hiodon
- Holmskioldia
- †Holopogon
- Homo
  - †Homo sapiens
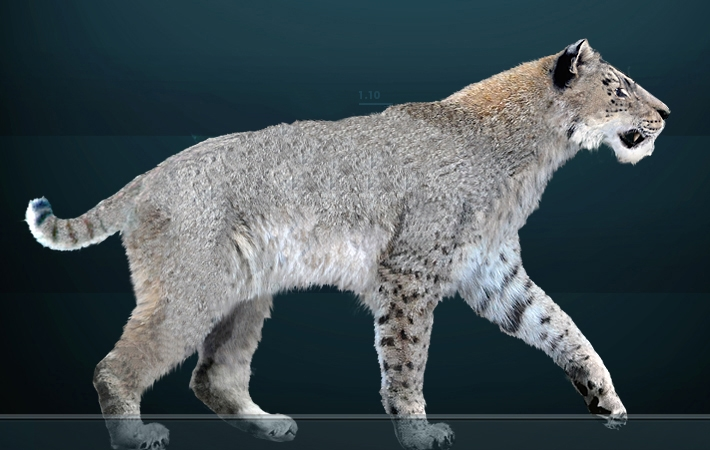
- Restoration of Pliocene-Pleistocene Homotherium, or scimitar cat
  †Homotherium
  - †Homotherium serum
- †Hutchemys – type locality for genus
- †Hyaenodon
  - †Hyaenodon crucians
- Hydrangea
- †Hydromystria
- †Hyopsodus
- †Hypertragulus
- †Hypisodus
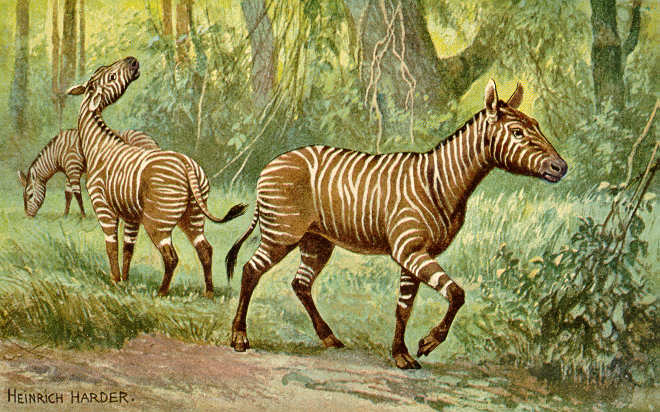
- Life restoration of the Miocene horse Hypohippus. Heinrich Harder (1920).
  †Hypohippus
- †Hypolagus
- †Hypsiops
- †Hyrachyus
- †Hyracodon
- †Ictidopappus
- †Intyrictis
- †Ischyrhiza – or unidentified comparable form
  - †Ischyrhiza avonicola
- †Ischyromys
- Isoetes
- Juglans
  - †Juglans regia – or unidentified comparable form
- Juniperus
- †Kerria
- †Kimbetohia
- Koelreuteria
- Lasius
- Laurus
- Lemmiscus
  - †Lemmiscus curtatus
- Lepisosteus
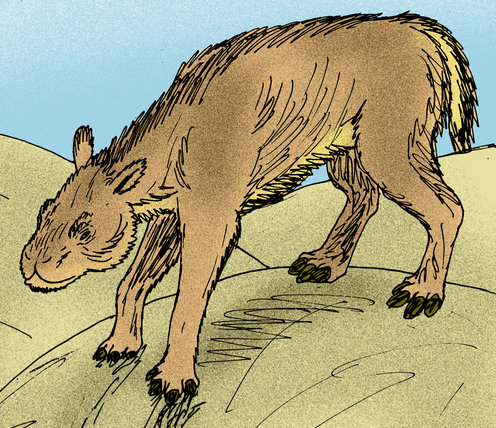
- Restoration of the Oligocene-Miocene oreodont mammal Leptauchenia
  †Leptauchenia
- †Leptictis
- †Leptocyon
- †Leptomeryx
- †Leptoreodon
- †Leucaena
- †Limnenetes
- Lindera
- †Lisserpeton
  - †Lisserpeton bairdi
- †Lithornis
  - †Lithornis celetius – type locality for species
- Lynx
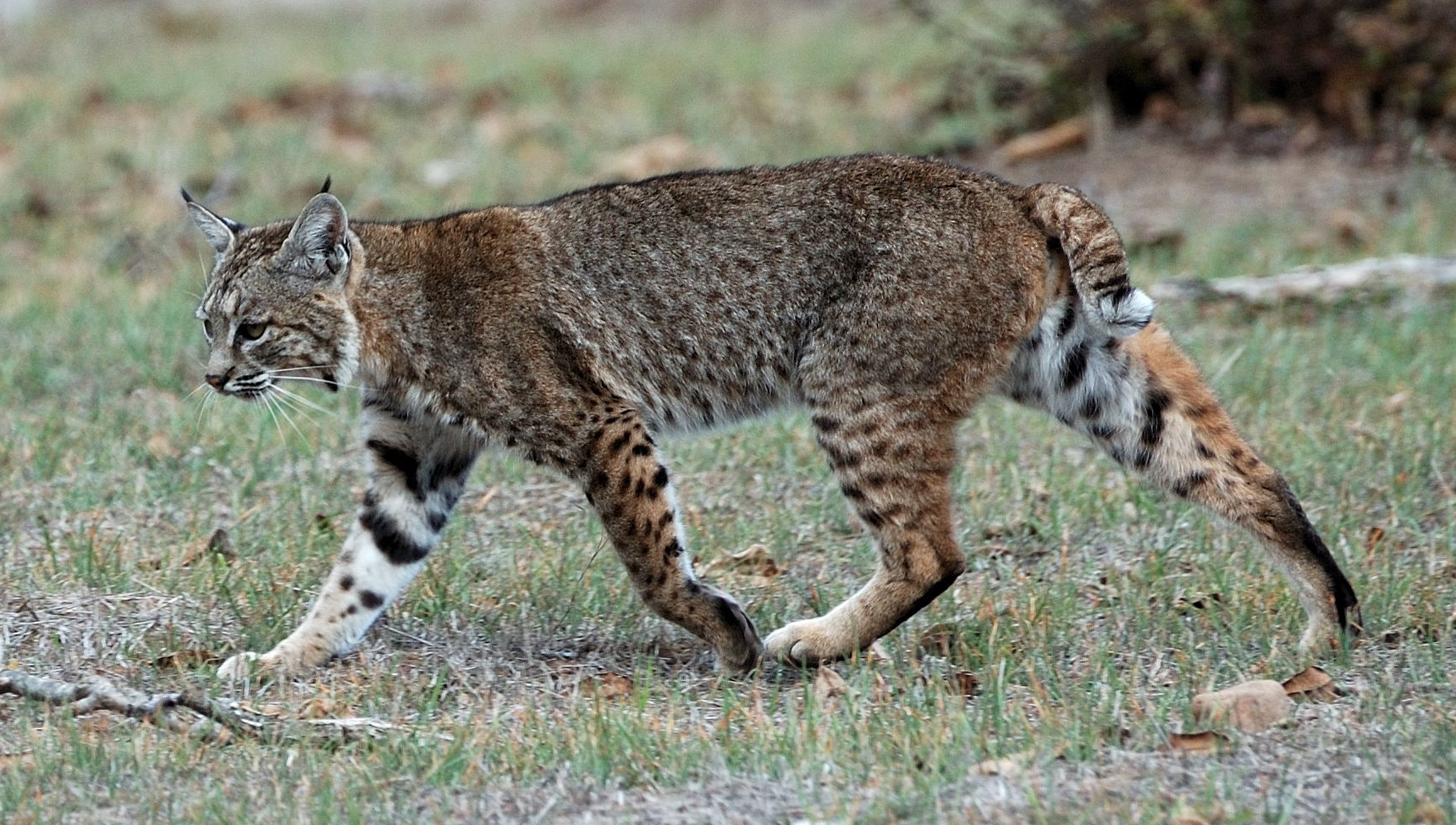
  - A living Lynx rufus, or bobcat
    †Lynx rufus
- Magnolia
- Mahonia
- †Mammut
  - †Mammut americanum
- †Mammuthus
  - †Mammuthus columbi
  - †Mammuthus primigenius
- Marchantia
- Marmota
- Martes
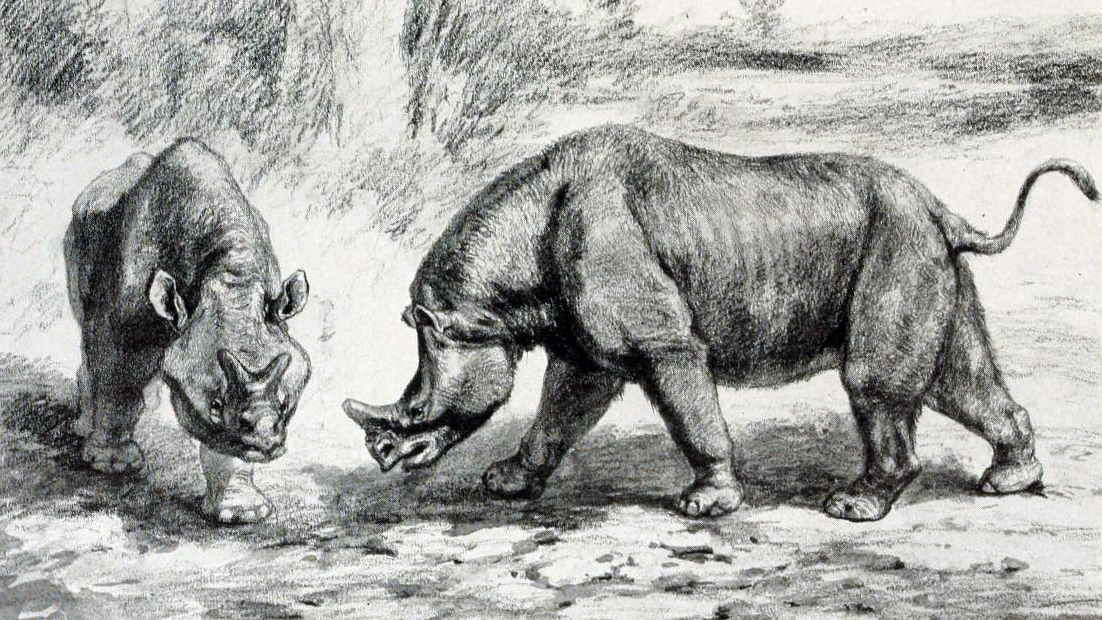
- Life restoration of battling males of the Eocene brontothere mammal Megacerops
  †Megacerops
- †Megahippus
- †Megalonyx
  - †Megalonyx jeffersonii
- †Megantereon
- †Megatylopus
- †Menodus
- †Merriamoceros
- †Merychippus
  - †Merychippus sejunctus
- †Merychyus
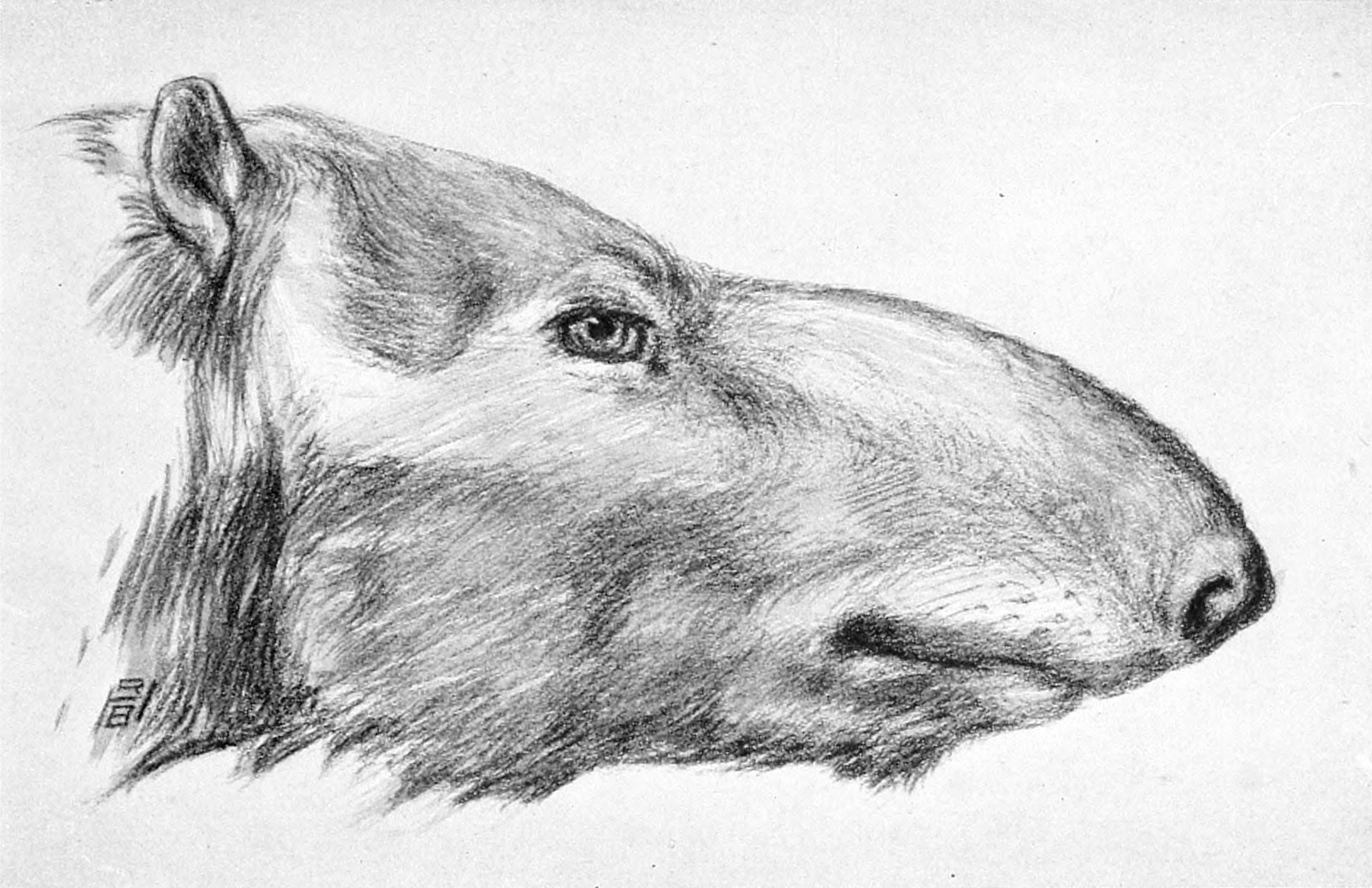
- Restorative portrait of the Oligocene-Miocene oreodont mammal Merycochoerus
  †Merycochoerus
- †Merycodus
- †Merycoides
- †Merycoidodon
- †Mesodma
  - †Mesodma formosa
  - †Mesodma garfieldensis – type locality for species
  - †Mesodma pygmaea – type locality for species
  - †Mesodma thompsoni
- †Mesohippus
- †Mesoreodon
- Metasequoia
  - †Metasequoia occidentalis
- †Metopium
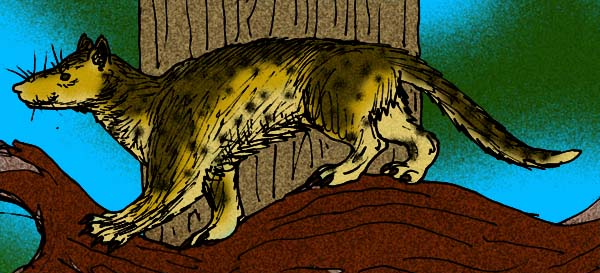
- Life restoration of the Paleocene-Eocene mammal Miacis
  †Miacis – report made of unidentified related form or using admittedly obsolete nomenclature
- †Microcosmodon
  - †Microcosmodon harleyi – type locality for species
- Microtus
  - †Microtus pennsylvanicus – or unidentified comparable form
- †Mimetodon
- †Miniochoerus – tentative report
- †Miohippus – type locality for genus
  - †Miohippus grandis
- †Monosaulax
- Morus
- Mustela
  - †Mustela frenata
- Myrica
- †Nanotragulus
- †Nelumbo
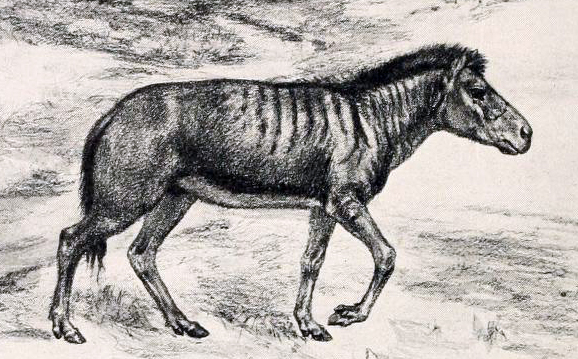
- Life restoration of a herd of Neohipparion. Robert Bruce Horsfall (1913).
  †Neohipparion
- †Neoplagiaulax
  - †Neoplagiaulax donaldorum – type locality for species
  - †Neoplagiaulax grangeri – type locality for species
  - †Neoplagiaulax hunteri – type locality for species
  - †Neoplagiaulax kremnus
  - †Neoplagiaulax mckennai
  - †Neoplagiaulax nelsoni – type locality for species
- †Niglarodon
- †Nuphar
- †Nyssa
- †Odaxosaurus
  - †Odaxosaurus piger
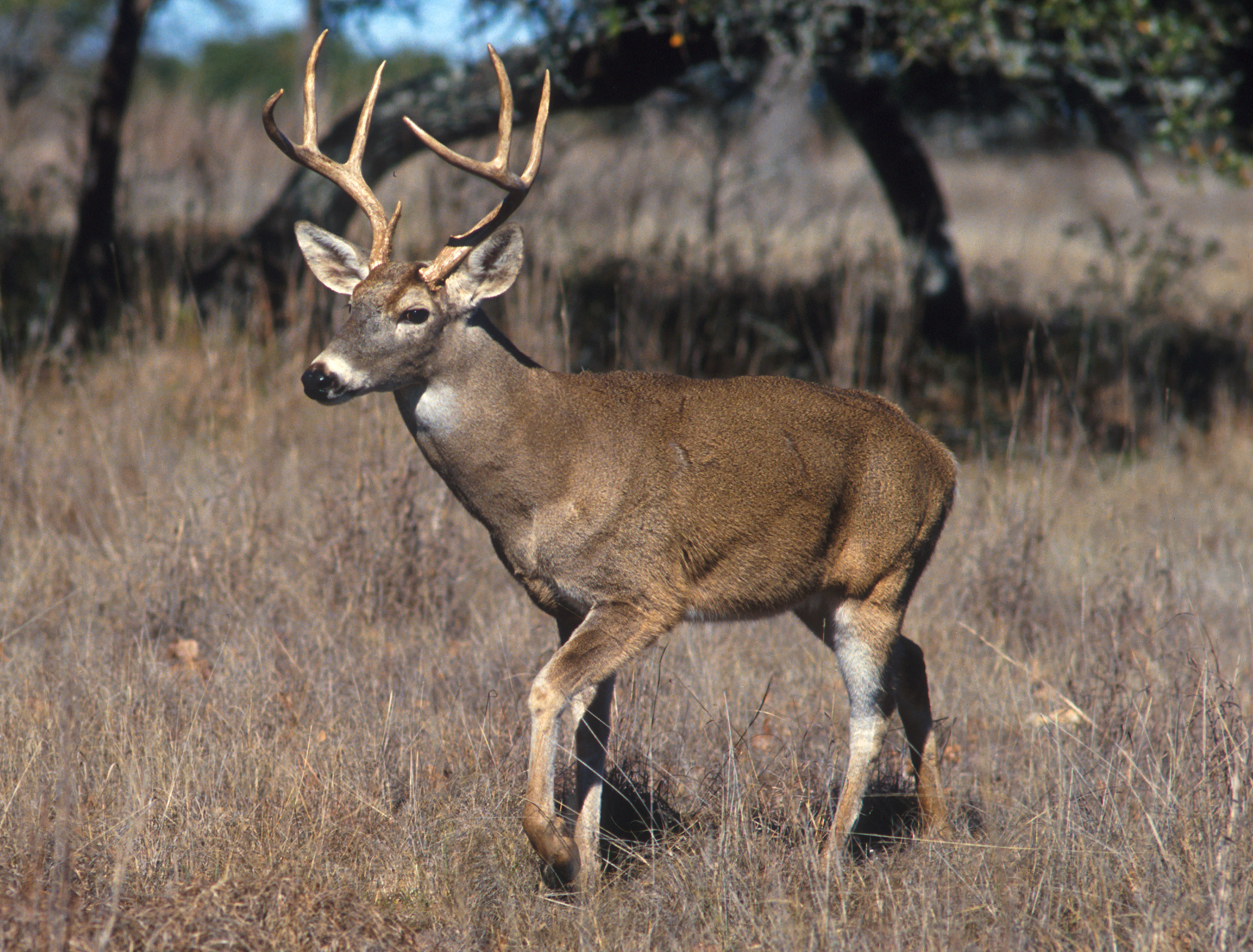
- A living Odocoileus deer
  Odocoileus – or unidentified comparable form
- Olar
- Ondatra
  - †Ondatra zibethicus
- †Onoclea
- †Opisthotriton
- Oreohelix
- †Oreonetes
- †Osmanthus
- †Osmunda
  - †Osmunda greenlandica
- Ostrya
- †Otarocyon
- †Oxyacodon
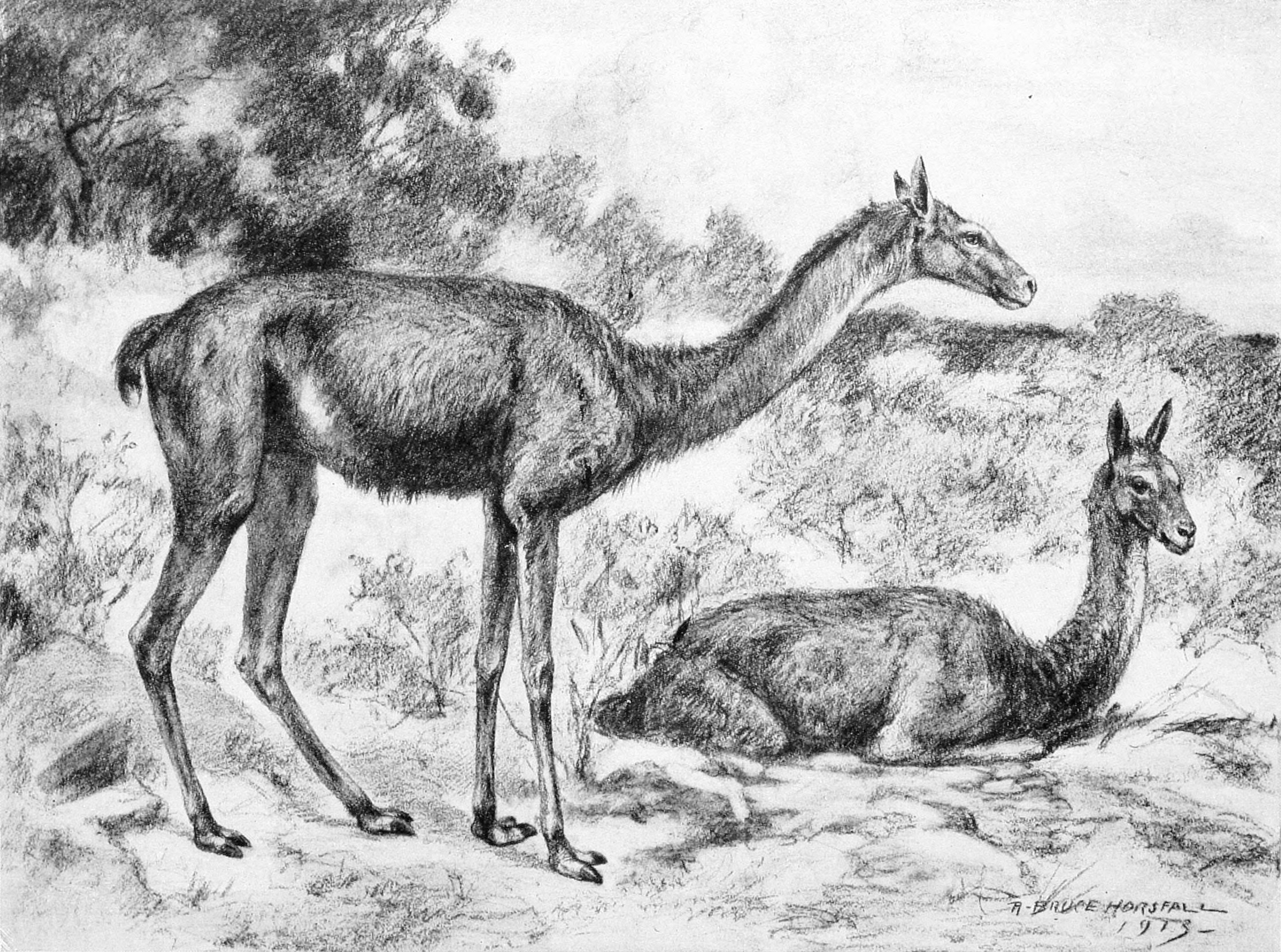
- Life restoration of a pair of the Oligocene-Miocene camel Oxydactylus. Robert Bruce Horsfall (1913).
  †Oxydactylus
- †Palaeogale
- †Palaeolagus
- †Palaeoryctes
- †Palaeosinopa
- †Palaeosyops
- †Palatobaena
- †Paleopsephurus – or unidentified comparable form
- Paliurus
- †Pandemonium
- †Pantolambda
- †Pantomimus – type locality for genus
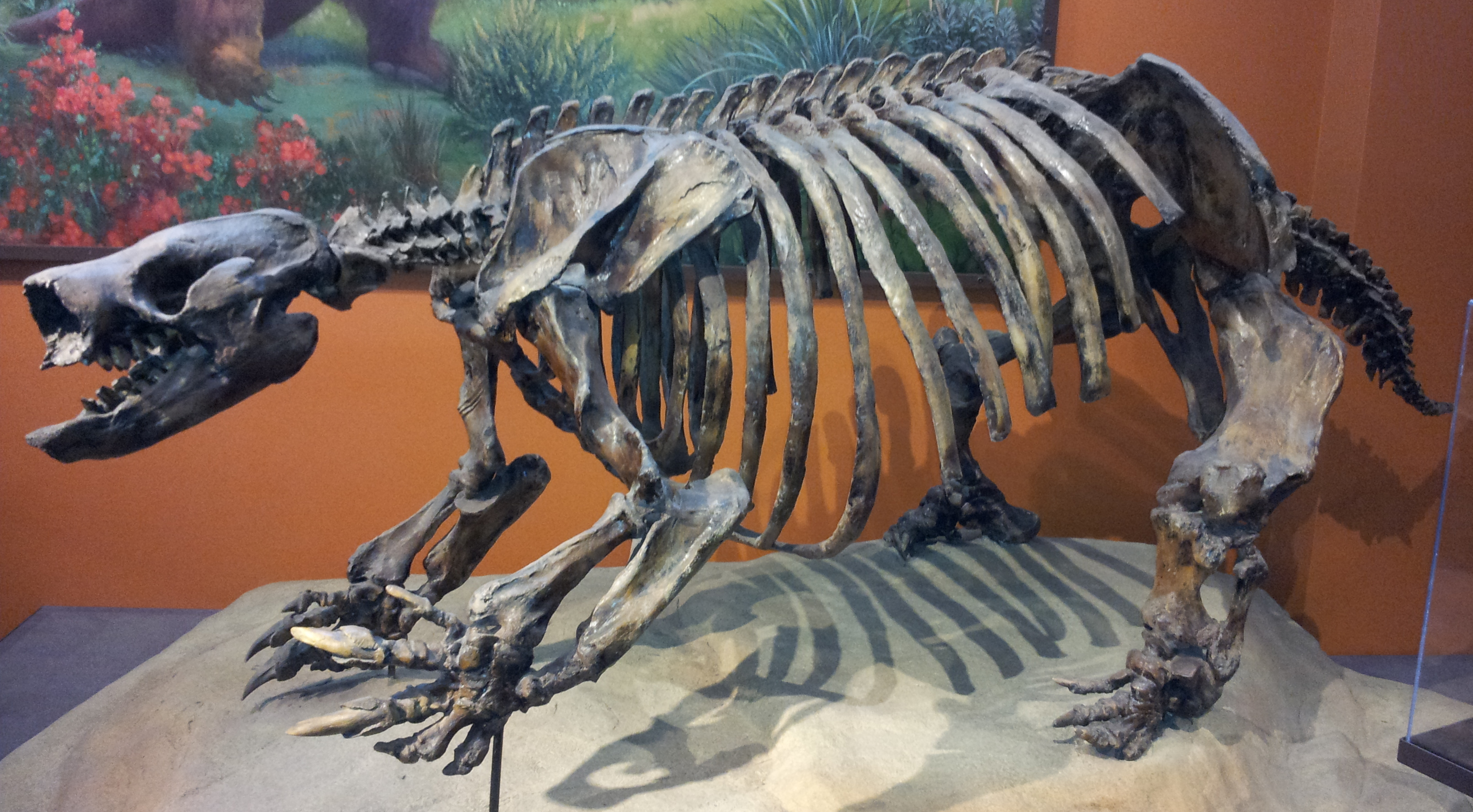
- Fossilized skeleton of the Pliocene-Pleistocene ground sloth Paramylodon
  †Paramylodon
  - †Paramylodon harlani
- †Paramys
- †Paratomarctus
- †Parectypodus
  - †Parectypodus sinclairi – type locality for species
  - †Parectypodus sylviae
- †Parictis
- †Parthenocissus
- †Paulownia
- †Peltosaurus
- Penthetria
- †Peraceras
- Perognathus
- Peromyscus
  - †Peromyscus maniculatus – or unidentified comparable form
- Persea
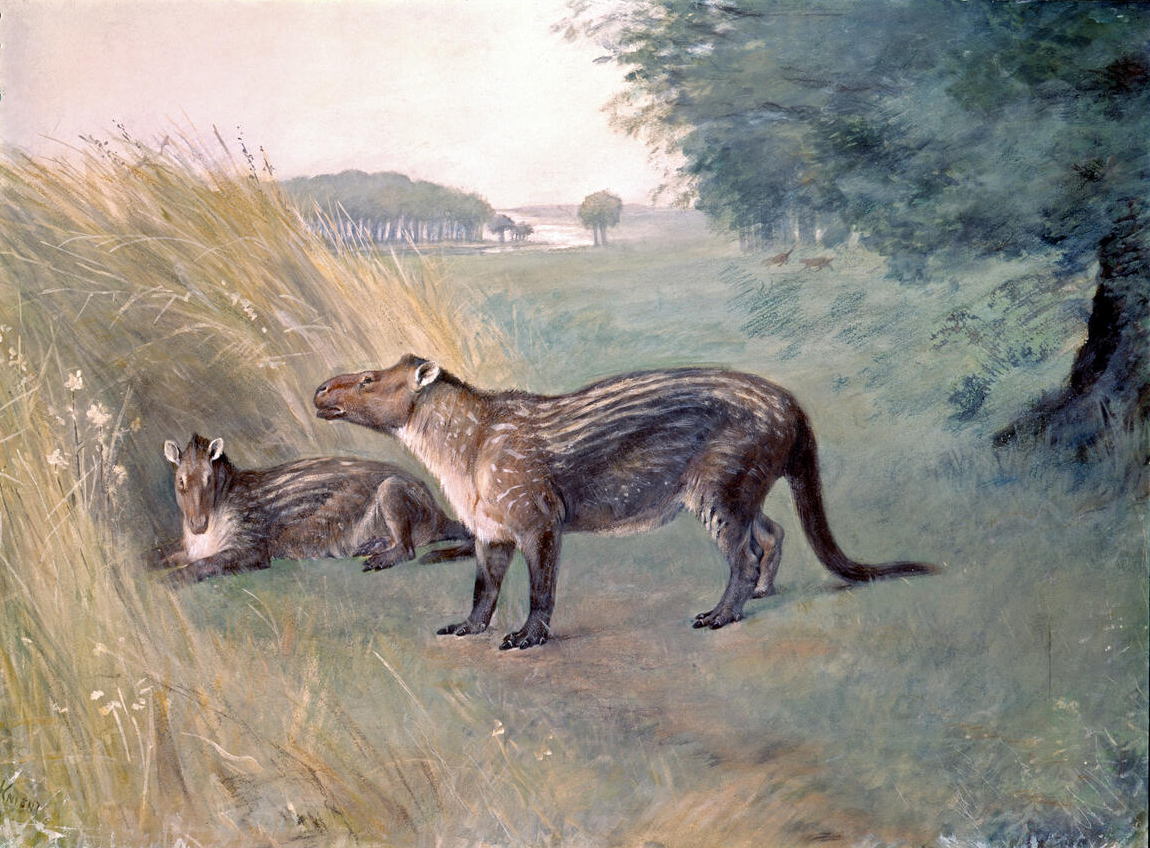
- Life restoration of the Paleocene-Eocene ungulate Phenacodus. Charles R. Knight (1898).
  †Phenacodus
- Phragmites
- Picea
- †Piceoerpeton
- Pinus
- †Pithecolobium
- †Planetetherium
  - †Planetetherium mirabile – type locality for species
- †Plastomenoides – type locality for genus
- Platanus
- Plecia
- †Plesiadapis
- †Pliohippus
- †Plithocyon
- †Poebrotherium
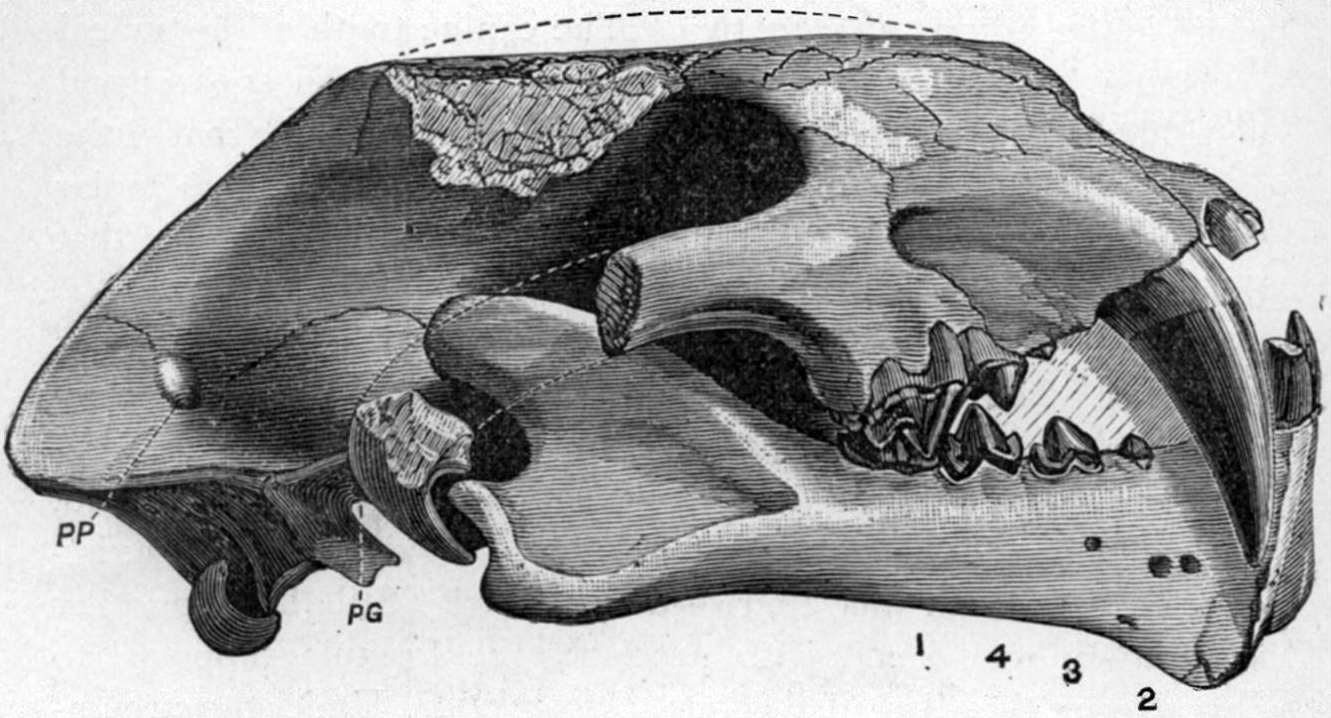
- Illustration of a fossilized skull of the Oligocene false faber-toothed cat Pogonodon
  †Pogonodon
- Populus
- †Potentilla
- †Prochetodon
  - †Prochetodon foxi – type locality for species
- †Prodesmodon
- †Proiridomyrmex
- †Promerycochoerus
- †Proscalops
- †Prosphyracephala
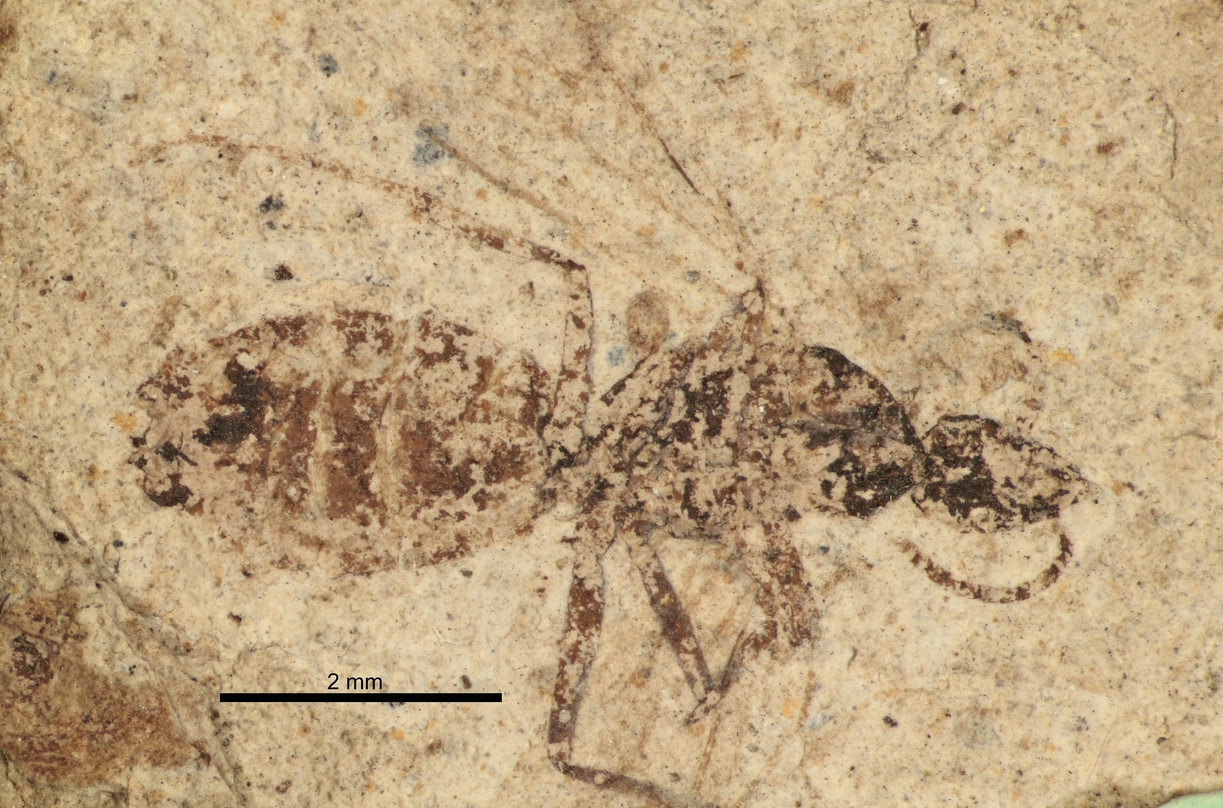
- Fossil of the Oligocene ant Protazteca
  †Protazteca
- †Protohippus
- †Protolabis
- †Protungulatum
  - †Protungulatum donnae
- Prunus
- †Pseudhipparion
- †Pseudolarix
- †Pseudomesoreodon – type locality for genus
- Pseudomyrmex
- †Pseudotsuga
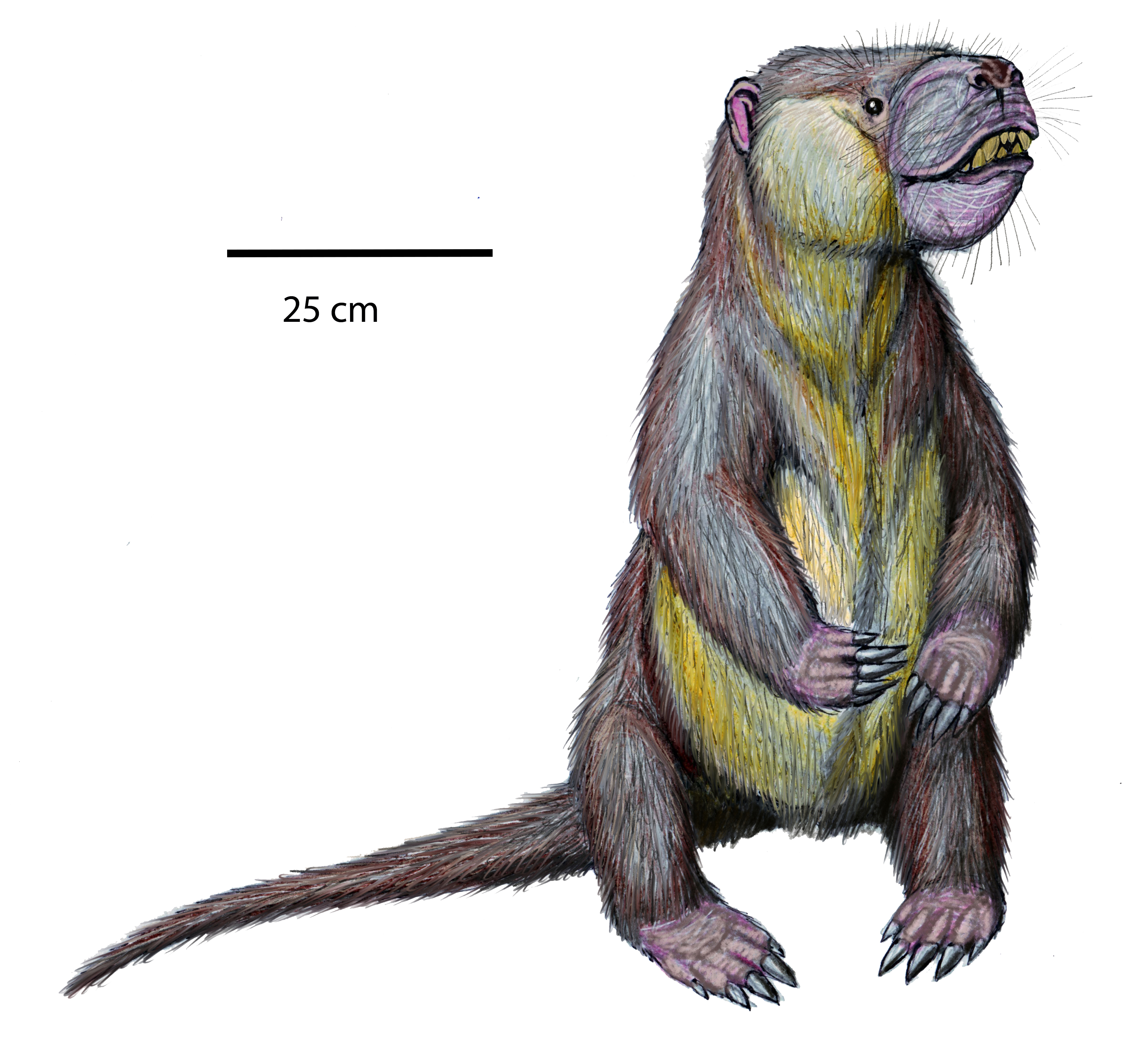
- Restoration of the Paleocene taeniodont mammal Psittacotherium multifragum
  †Psittacotherium
- Ptelea
- Pteris
- Pterocarya
- †Ptilodus
  - †Ptilodus kummae
  - †Ptilodus montanus – type locality for species
  - †Ptilodus tsosiensis
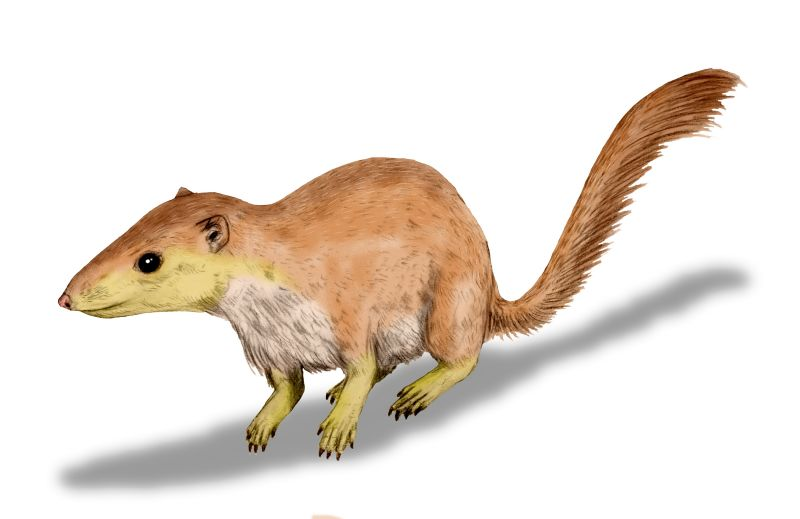
- Life restoration of the Late Cretaceous-Paleocene primate relative Purgatorius
  †Purgatorius
  - †Purgatorius janisae – type locality for species
  - †Purgatorius titusi – type locality for species
  - †Purgatorius unio – type locality for species
- †Pyracantha
- Quercus
- †Rana – or unidentified comparable form
- Rangifer
  - †Rangifer tarandus
- †Rhamnus
  - †Rhamnus crocea
- Rhus
- †Robinia
- Rosa
- Sabal
- †Saccoloma
- Salix
- †Sambucus
- †Sapindus
- Sassafras
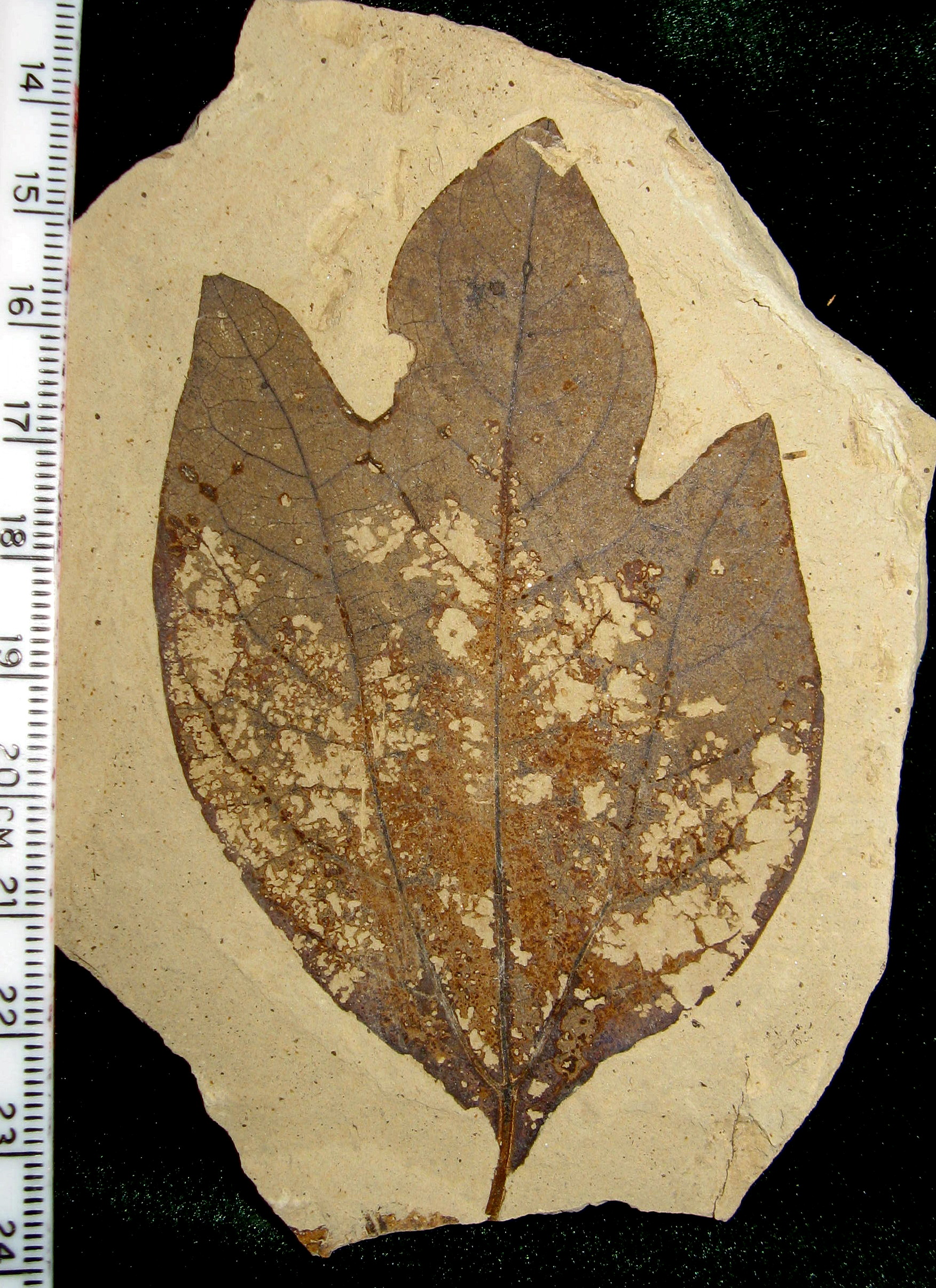
  - Fossilized leaf of the Eocene sassafras Sassafras hesperia
    †Sassafras hesperia
- †Scapherpeton
- †Scaphohippus
- †Scotiophryne – or unidentified comparable form
- †Selaginella
- Sequoia
  - †Sequoia affinis
- †Simoedosaurus
- †Simpson
- †Smilax
- †Sophora
- †Sorbus
- †Sparganium
- Spea
- Spermophilus
  - †Spermophilus richardsonii
- †Spiraea
- †Stelocyon
- †Steneofiber
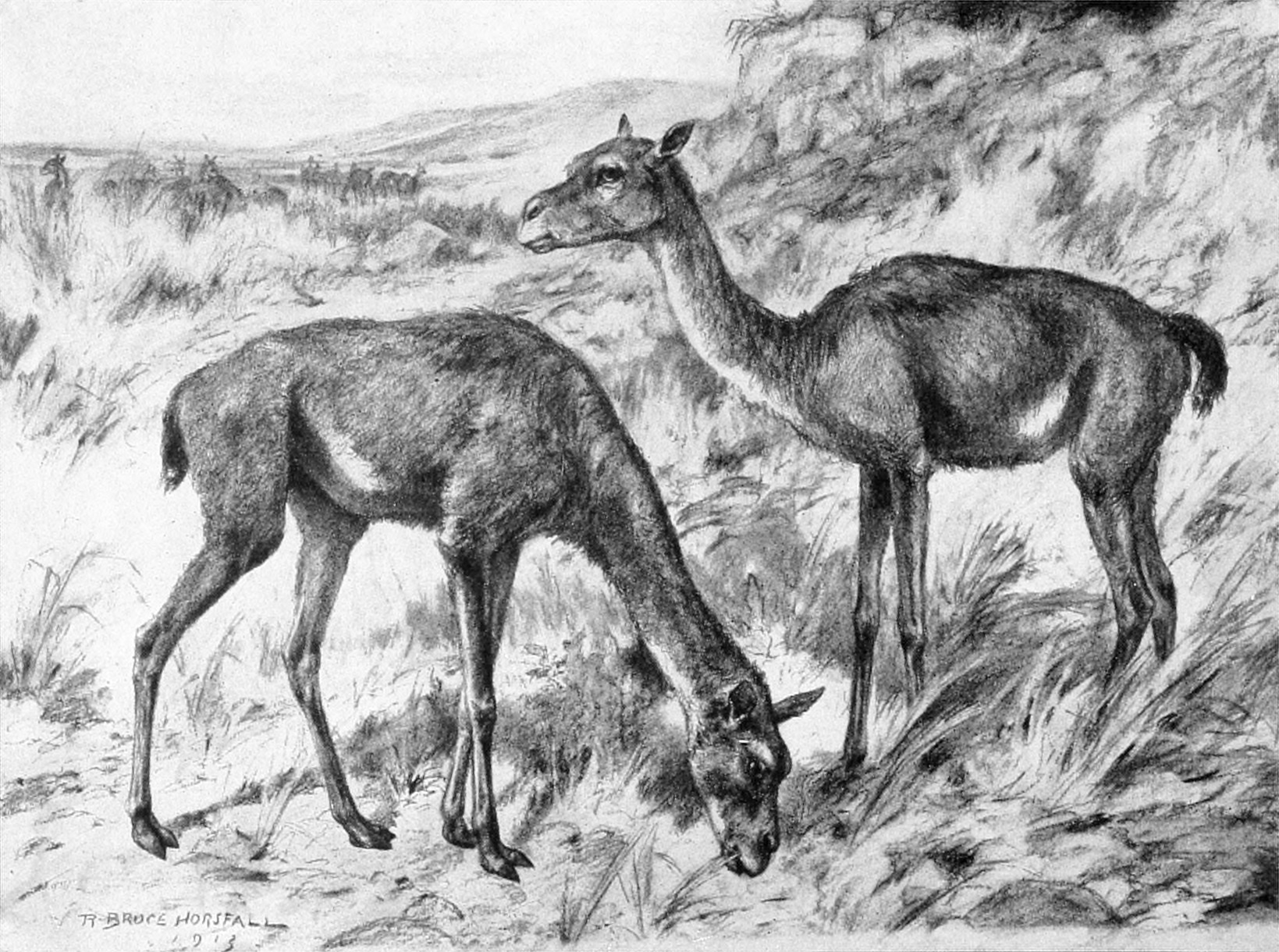
- Life restoration of the Oligocene-Miocene camel Stenomylus
  †Stenomylus
  - †Stenomylus hitchcocki – or unidentified comparable form
- Sterculia
- †Stygimys
  - †Stygimys camptorhiza – or unidentified comparable form
  - †Stygimys jepseni – type locality for species
  - †Stygimys kuszmauli – type locality for species
- †Subdromomeryx
  - †Subdromomeryx antilopinus
- †Subhyracodon
- †Submerycochoerus
  - †Sylvicola fenestralis
- Sylvilagus
  - †Sylvilagus nuttallii
- †Symplocarpus
- †Taeniolabis
  - †Taeniolabis lamberti – type locality for species
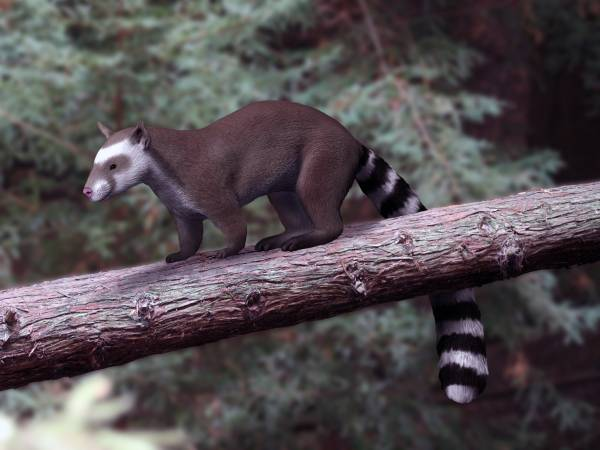
- Life restoration of the Eocene carnivoran relative Tapocyon
  †Tapocyon
- Taricha
- Taxodium
- †Teleoceras
- †Tetraclaenodon
- Thomomys
  - †Thomomys talpoides
- †Thrinax
- †Thuja
- †Ticholeptus
- Tilia
- †Tinuviel
- Tipula
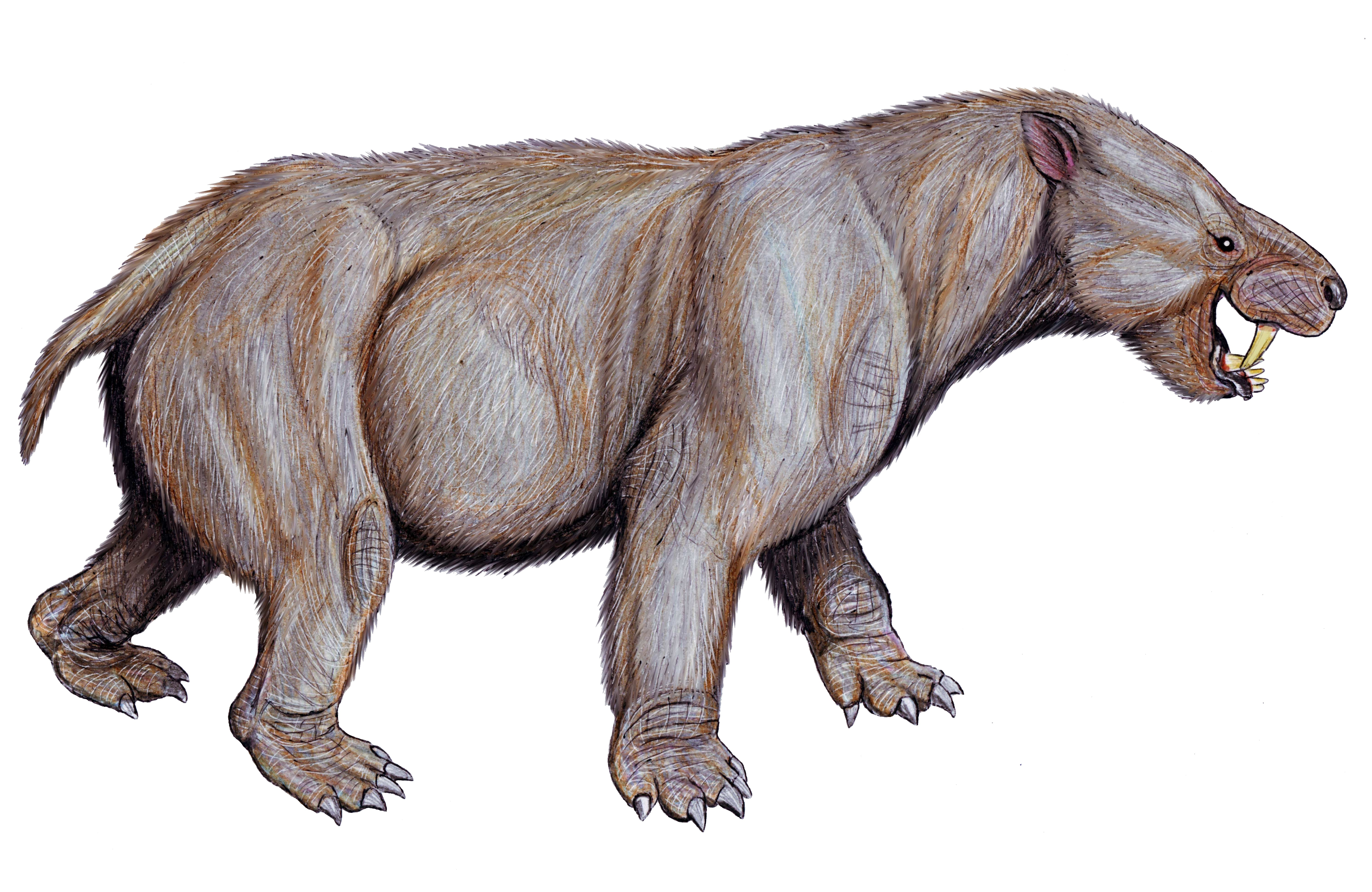
- Life restoration of the Paleocene pantodonts mammal Titanoides
  †Titanoides
  - †Titanoides gidleyi
- †Trapa
- †Trigenicus
- †Trigonias
- †Tropidia
- †Tylocephalonyx
- Typha
- Ulmus
- Ursus
- †Vaccinium
- †Valenopsalis
- †Vauquelinia
- †Viburnum
- †Viguiera
- Vitis
- †Viverravus – tentative report
- †Woodwardia
- †Xyronomys
- Zelkova
