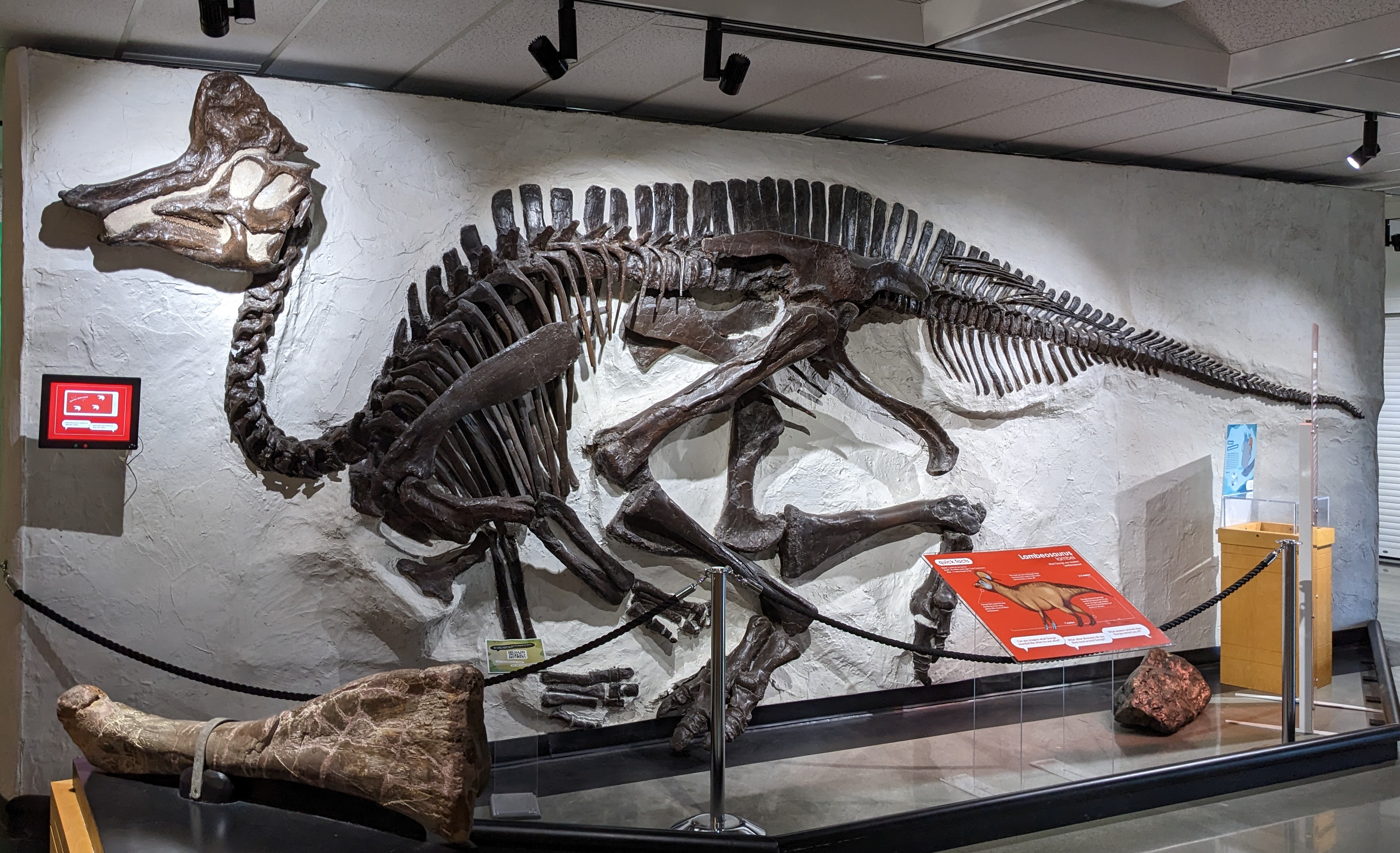
- Mounted Lambeosaurus skeleton, Pacific Museum of Earth, UBC

Scientific classification
- Kingdom: Animalia
- Phylum: Chordata
- Class: Reptilia
- Clade: Dinosauria
- Clade: †Ornithischia
- Clade: †Ornithopoda
- Family: †Hadrosauridae
- Subfamily: †Lambeosaurinae
- Tribe: †Lambeosaurini
- Genus: †Lambeosaurus; Parks, 1923

Type species
- †Lambeosaurus lambei Parks, 1923

Other species
- †L. magnicristatus Sternberg, 1935; †L. clavinitialis? Sternberg, 1935

Synonyms
- Genus synonymy: Procheneosaurus Matthew, 1920 (conserved name); Tetragonosaurus Parks, 1931; Species synonymy: Tetragonosaurus praeceps Parks, 1931; Procheneosaurus praeceps (Parks, 1931) Lull & Wright, 1942; Tetragonosaurus cranibrevis Sternberg, 1935; Procheneosaurus cranibrevis (Sternberg, 1935) Lull & Wright, 1942; Corythosaurus frontalis Parks, 1935

= Lambeosaurus =

Lambeosaurus Temporal range: Late Cretaceous (Campanian), 76.47–74.44 Ma

Hadrosaurid dinosaur genus from Late Cretaceous US and Canada

Lambeosaurus (/ˌlæmbiəˈsɔːrəs/ LAM-bee-ə-SOR-əs) is a genus of hadrosaurid dinosaur that lived during the Late Cretaceous period of western North America. The first skull of Lambeosaurus found was used by palaeontologist Lawrence M. Lambe to justify the creation of the new genus Stephanosaurus, although it was not part of the latter's original material. Its incomplete nature led William A. Parks to name Lambeosaurus lambei for this skull in 1923 to honour Lambe. Multiple species of Lambeosaurus have been named since, including L. clavinitialis and L. magnicristatus in 1935, and L. laticaudus in 1981 which was later moved to its own genus Magnapaulia. It has also been identified that some species earlier identified as belonging to Tetragonosaurus and Corythosaurus are now considered juveniles of Lambeosaurus. It is the eponymous member of the subfamily Lambeosaurinae and tribe Lambeosaurini. Lambeosaurins, which also includes Corythosaurus and Hypacrosaurus from western North America, are understood to be some of the most specialized ornithopods.

Adult Lambeosaurus would have grown to around 7–7.7 m (23–25 ft) long and weighed 2.6–3.4 t (2.6–3.3 long tons; 2.9–3.7 short tons). It was able to move on two or four legs, with a deep tail, long limbs, and a highly distinct, hollow cranial crest. This crest, which can be used to separate the three recognized species of Lambeosaurus, projects well above the eye and slightly over the snout, and adults of some species possess a backwards spur. The function of the crest, which is also found in other lambeosaurines, is debated historically, but modern studies show that it could have been used as a resonating device for vocalisation, with a secondary function of sexual or species identification. The crest also allows for the identification of juveniles, which are otherwise nearly indistinguishable from those of Corythosaurus. It is through this identification that the growth of Lambeosaurus is well-known, with the crest developing late but expanding in height by an order of magnitude by the time individuals reached adulthood. Skin impressions are known and show that it had unornamented scales across the entire body.

The species of Lambeosaurus are only known from the middle Campanian of the Dinosaur Park Formation of Alberta. L. clavinitialis is known from a restricted range as the oldest species, overlapping with L. lambei which lived for around 0.3 million years before L. magnicristatus evolved later in the Campanian. This temporal separation suggests that L. clavinitialis, which was previously believed to be a female of either L. lambei or L. magnicristatus, is a separate species or at least earlier population. Lambeosaurus would have lived alongside the lambeosaurines Corythosaurus and Parasaurolophus, and also the saurolophine Prosaurolophus. Dental wear suggests that Lambeosaurus would have avoided competition with Prosaurolophus by occupying different feeding niches, preferring more closed habitats and browsing lower to the ground with a more generalised diet. The habitat Lambeosaurus lived in was a coastal plain where meandering rivers separated regions of dense vegetation, covered in a diversity of conifers, ferns and other shrubs, and occupied by diverse invertebrates, fish, mammals and reptiles, especially other megaherbivorous dinosaurs.

== Discovery and species ==
=== Naming of Lambeosaurus ===
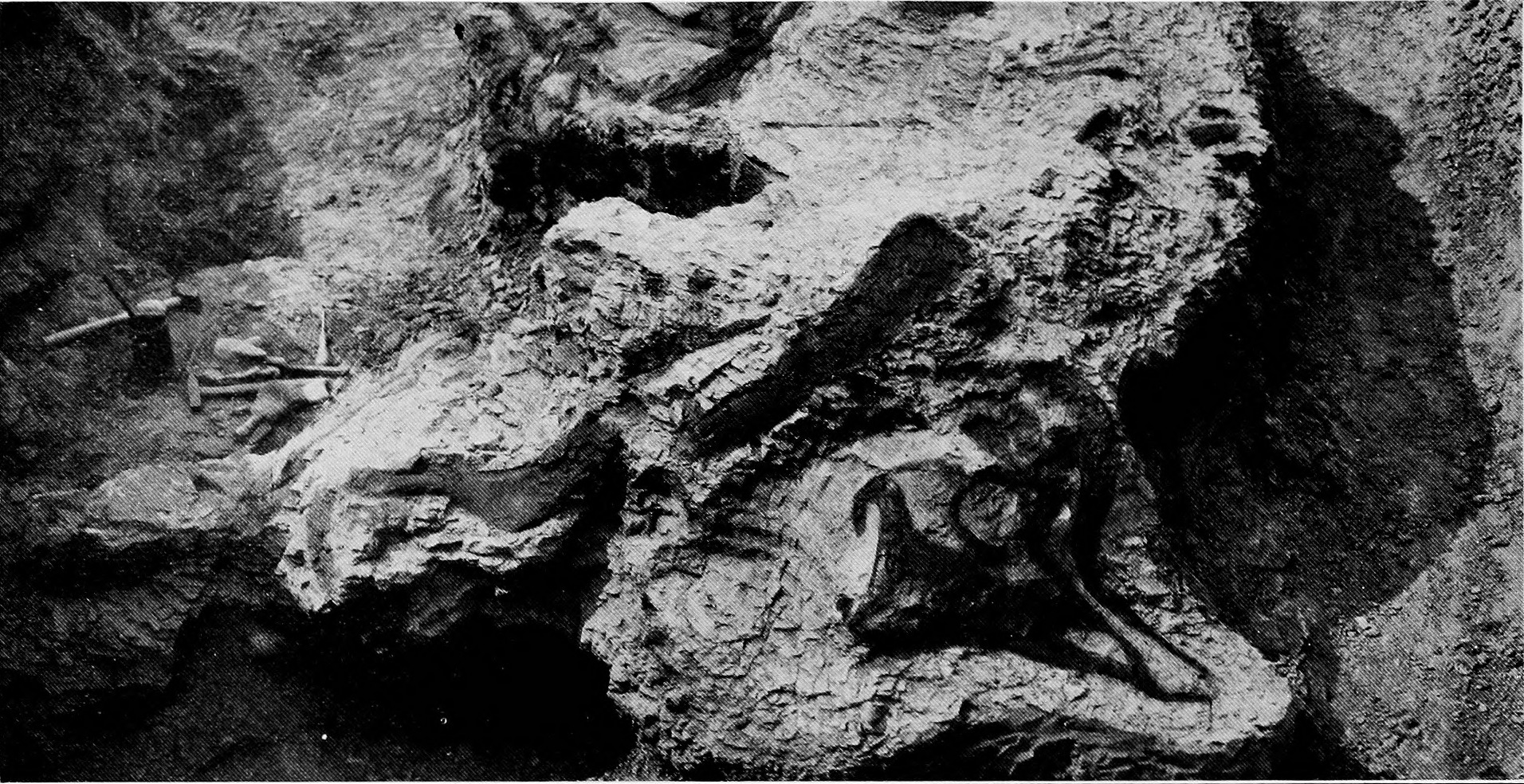
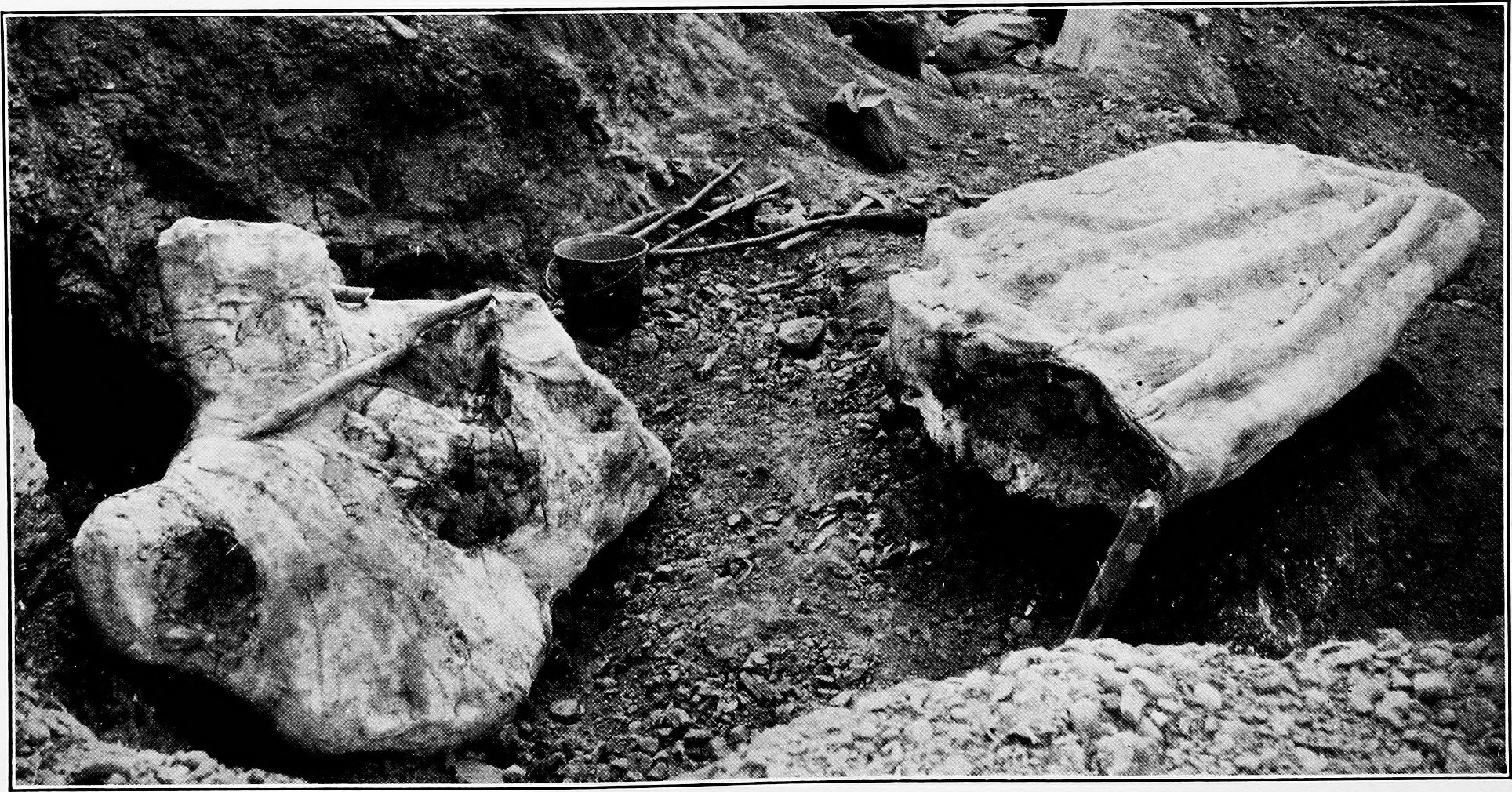
L. lambei specimen CMN 8503 being excavated in Alberta in 1917

In the 1880s and 1890s, expeditions of the Geological Survey of Canada into Alberta discovered that the rocks along the Red Deer River bore dinosaur fossils of scientific importance. These deposits were identified as belonging to either the Edmonton or Belly River Series, of the middle to end Cretaceous. Canadian palaeontologist Lawrence M. Lambe undertook three expeditions in 1897, 1898 and 1901 to an extensive series of badlands between Berry Creek and Deadlodge canyon. The fossils discovered were fragile and therefore difficult to excavate, but belonged to many species, including three new species of the hadrosaur Trachodon that Lambe named Trachodon selwyni, Trachodon marginatus, and Trachodon altidens in 1902. T. marginatus was named for a partial skeleton as well as isolated jaw and limb bones, and T. altidens was named for a partial maxilla with many teeth. In the same publication, American palaeontologist Henry Fairfield Osborn summarized the fauna of the mid-Cretaceous across North America, and provided the possible new subgenus name Didanodon for T. altidens.

A 1913 expedition of the Geological Survey to the same location resulted in the discovery of multiple hadrosaur skeletons by American palaeontologist Charles Hazelius Sternberg. Among these specimens was a skull, skeletons, and skin impressions, which Lambe regarded as additional material of T. marginatus in 1914. One of these specimens (CMN 351), found by Sternberg 5.6 km (3.5 mi) southeast of the mouth of Berry Creek, was described by Lambe more thoroughly later in 1914. Based on this specimen, Lambe concluded that T. marginatus belonged in a new genus, which he named Stephanosaurus. To Stephanosaurus he assigned the original material of T. marginatus, as well as CMN 351 and another specimen found by Sternberg in 1913. Lambe also attempted to replace the holotype of S. marginatus (CMN 419), the partial skeleton he described in 1902, with the isolated jaw bones (CMN 361 and 362) he described in the same year, which is not permitted by the rules of zoological nomenclature. However, American palaeontologist Barnum Brown argued later that year that the skull and jaws cannot be confidently assigned to Stephanosaurus because the type specimen does not include any skull material to compare with, and noted similarities with the skull of his new genus Corythosaurus. In 1920, Lambe assigned another, even more complete skull (CMN 2869) to Stephanosaurus that showed differences to Corythosaurus. This skull was found by Charles Mortram Sternberg (son of C.H. Sternberg) in 1917 from around 6.4 km (4 mi) southeast of the mouth of Little Sandhill Creek. However, Canadian palaeontologist William A. Parks noted that Brown's logic still applied, and designated the new genus and species Lambeosaurus lambei for the complete skulls CMN 351 and CMN 2869 in 1923, as they could not justifiably be assigned to Stephanosaurus. Parks chose the name Lambeosaurus lambei to give Lambe, who had died in 1919, as much credit as possible for the initial identification of new hadrosaur.

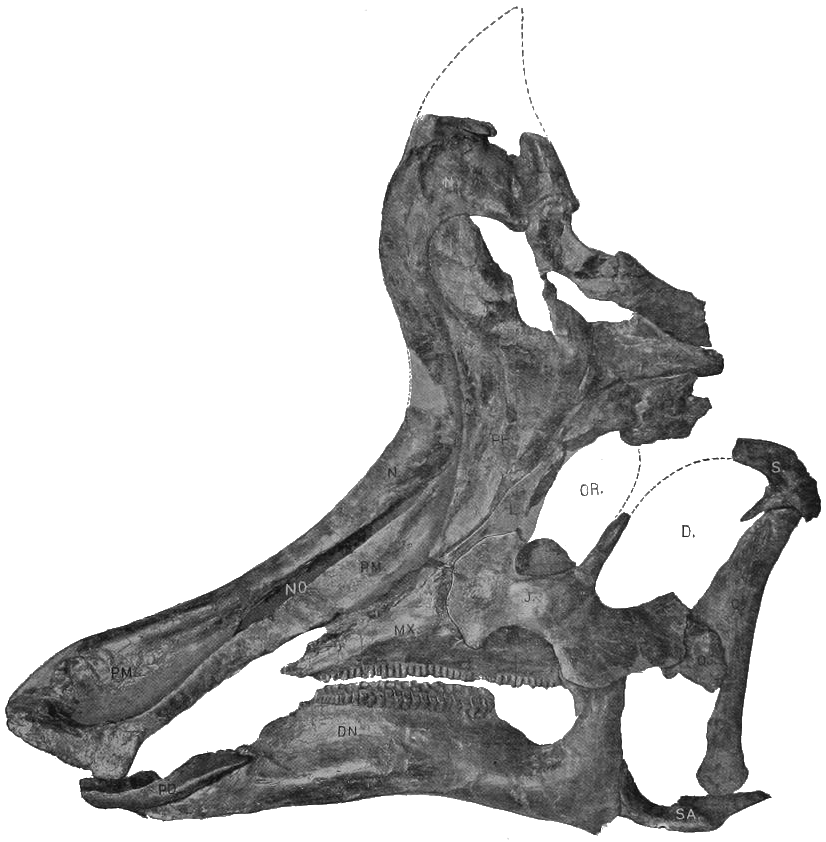
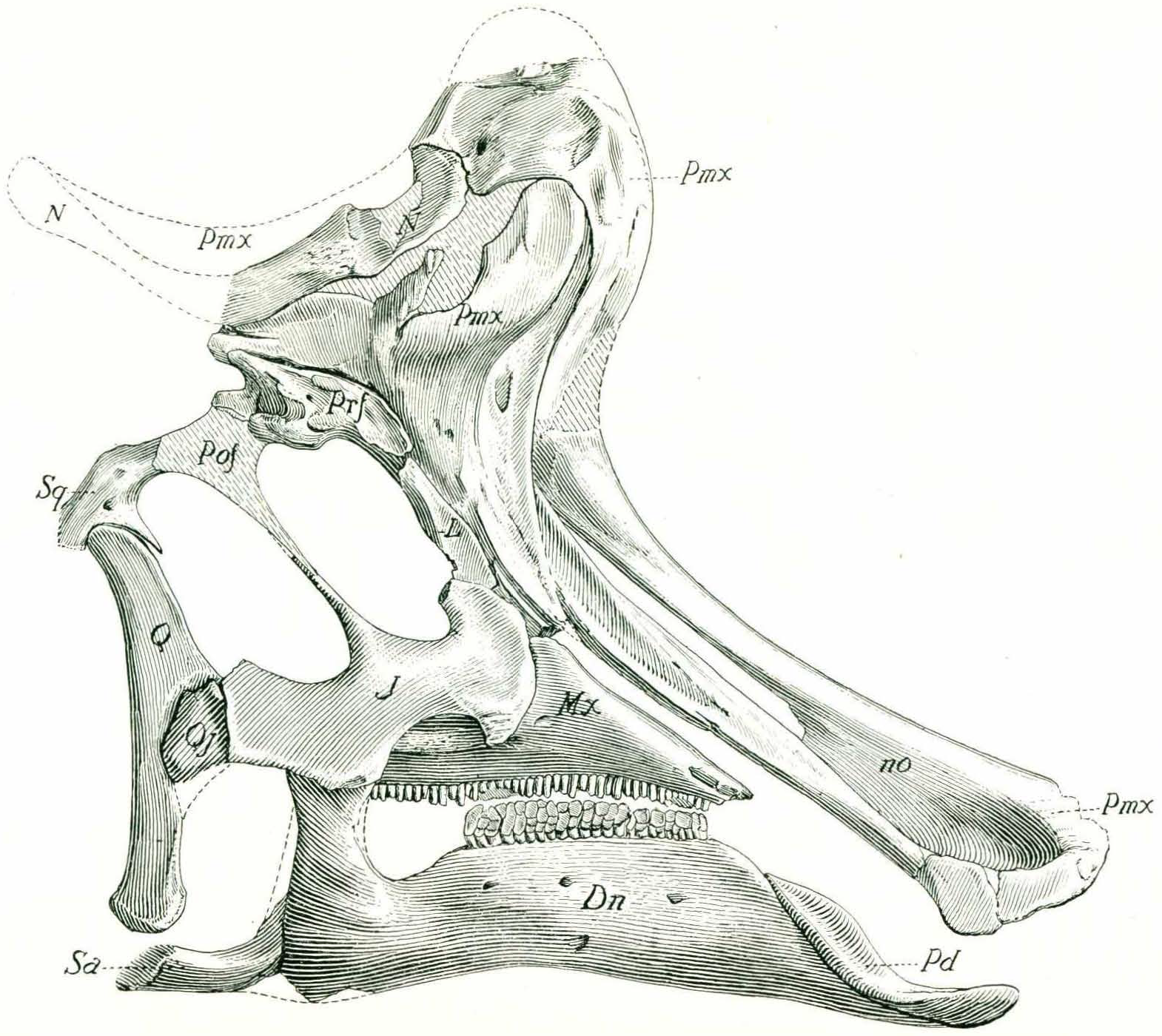
Photo and illustration of L. clavinitialis specimen CMN 351 first suggested to be the skull of Stephanosaurus

In 1924, American palaeontologist Charles W. Gilmore described the type material of Lambeosaurus in more detail. He found that the type material of Stephanosaurus was likely not the same taxon as the skulls and may have belonged to Kritosaurus, and that the two jaw specimens Lambe tried to designate as types were also possibly Kritosaurus. Gilmore selected the better preserved skull that Lambe described in 1920 (CMN 2869) as the type specimen of Lambeosaurus lambei, as no type specimen had been designated by Parks. Additional specimens that Gilmore assigned to Lambeosaurus include CMN 351 and CMN 8503, the latter of which includes a partial skull and articulated skeleton also found by C.M. Sternberg in 1917, 5.6 km (3.5 mi) west of the mouth of Little Sandhill Creek. Other early material of Lambeosaurus includes one of the specimens collected by C.H. Sternberg in 1913 that is now at the University of British Columbia, where it was put on display in 1950; a skull (FMNH UC 1479) collected in 1926 by Levi Sternberg (son of C.H. Sternberg); and a skeleton missing the skull (FMNH PR 380) collected in 1922 by an expedition of the Field Museum of Natural History, which was originally identified as Prosaurolophus before being prepared and mounted as a Lambeosaurus being scavenged by Daspletosaurus. It was earlier believed that the skull and skeleton could have belonged to the same individual, but it is now known that they were found 9.7 km (6 mi) apart.

=== Procheneosaurus and Tetragonosaurus ===
The American Museum of Natural History also excavated in the Red Deer River region, primarily through the work of Brown from 1909 to 1914. One particularly small individual discovered by Brown, was assigned to as "Procheneosaurus" by American palaeontologist William Diller Matthew in 1920, and then again in 1923 by Matthew and Brown where the specimen in question was identified as AMNH 5340. Matthew himself did not believe that the description was adequate to name a new taxon, writing to C.M. Sternberg in 1921 that "Procheneosaurus" should be considered a nomen nudum, an informal name not to be used in taxonomy. In 1931, Parks described more small, crested hadrosaurs found by expeditions of the University of Toronto into the Red Deer badlands. The first (ROM 3577) was found around 3.2 km (2 mi) southeast of Little Sandhill Creek by L. Sternberg. Parks described this specimen, which includes a skull and part of the vertebral column, as the new taxon Tetragonosaurus praeceps. The second specimen, ROM 3578, was found in 1927 by L. Sternberg around 2.4 km (1.5 mi) downriver of Little Sandhill Creek. This specimen, which comprises only the skull, was named Tetragonosaurus erectofrons by Parks. Together, both species were considered to be close to Cheneosaurus and had similar low-domed crests.

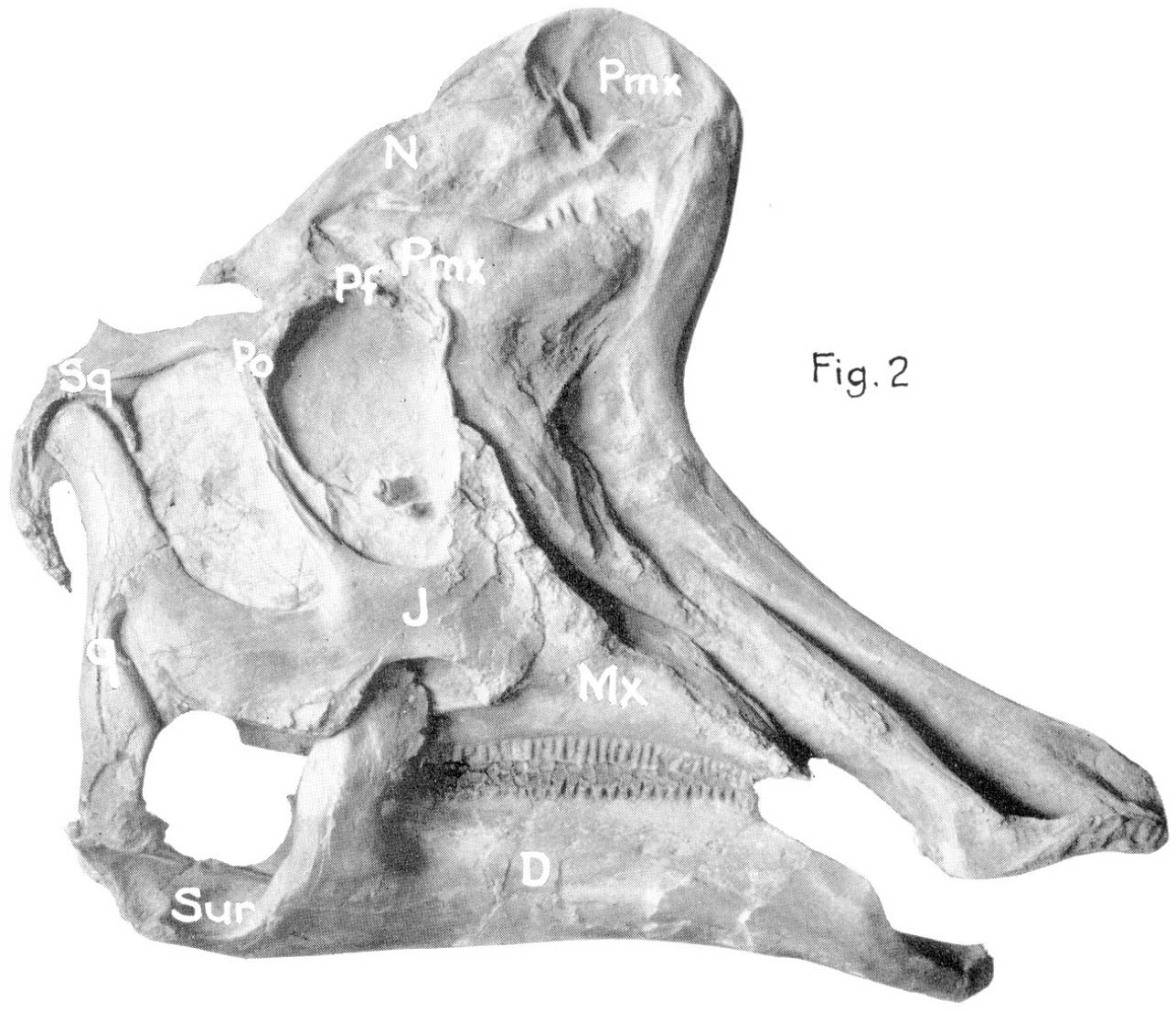
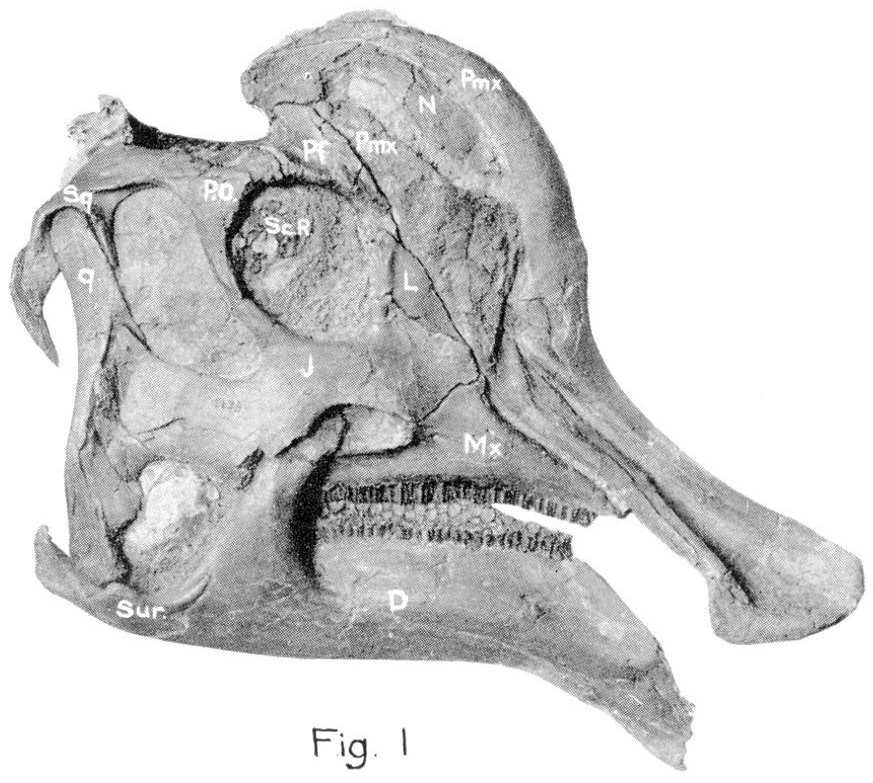
L. clavinitialis type CMN 8703 (left) and T. cranibrevis type CMN 8633 (right)

In 1935, Charles M. Sternberg reassessed the taxonomy of crested hadrosaurs after completing the preparation of the 18 skulls and skeletons at the Canadian Museum of Nature. This work resulted in the naming of two new species of Lambeosaurus, L. clavinitialis and L. magnicristatum, and one new species of Tetragonosaurus, T. cranibrevis. The latter was based on a partial skull (CMN 8633) that Sternberg found in 1928 ca. 3.62 km (2.25 mi) south of the mouth of Berry Creek. L. clavinitialis was named for a skull and skeleton (CMN 8703) that Sternberg found nearby, also in 1928, ca. 4.0 km (2.5 mi) south of the mouth of Berry Creek. L. magnicristatum (Note: Spelling amended to L. magnicristatus in 1938) was named for a mostly complete skull and skeleton (CMN 8705) Sternberg found in 1919, about 4.8 km (3 mi) southwest of the mouth of Little Sandhill Creek. Sternberg also reassigned the specimen CMN 8503 to Corythosaurus; this specimen was previously assigned to L. lambei by Gilmore. Also in 1935, Parks named the new species Corythosaurus frontalis for a specimen from the same area (ROM 869).

In, 1942, American palaeontologists Richard Swann Lull and Nelda E. Wright assessed the extensive number of hadrosaur genera and species in a review article. Lull and Wright considered L. lambei, L. clavinitialis, and L. magnicristatus as valid species of Lambeosaurus, each known from multiple specimens. To L. lambei they assigned CMN 2869, ROM 5131, and ROM 1218, the second collected in 1920 by Levi Sternberg 2.4 km (1.5 mi) northeast of Happy Jack Ferry, and the latter collected in the 1919 expedition on the south side of Red Deer River. L. clavinitialis included the specimens CMN 8703, CMN 351, and YPM 3222, the latter found in 1919 by C.M. Sternberg 4.8 km (3 mi) south of the mouth of Little Sandhill Creek. L. magnicristatus was limited to the type CMN 8705. Several other specimens (CMN 8502, AMNH 5353, AMNH 5373, AMNH 5666, and USNM 10309) were assigned to Lambeosaurus but not to a particular species.

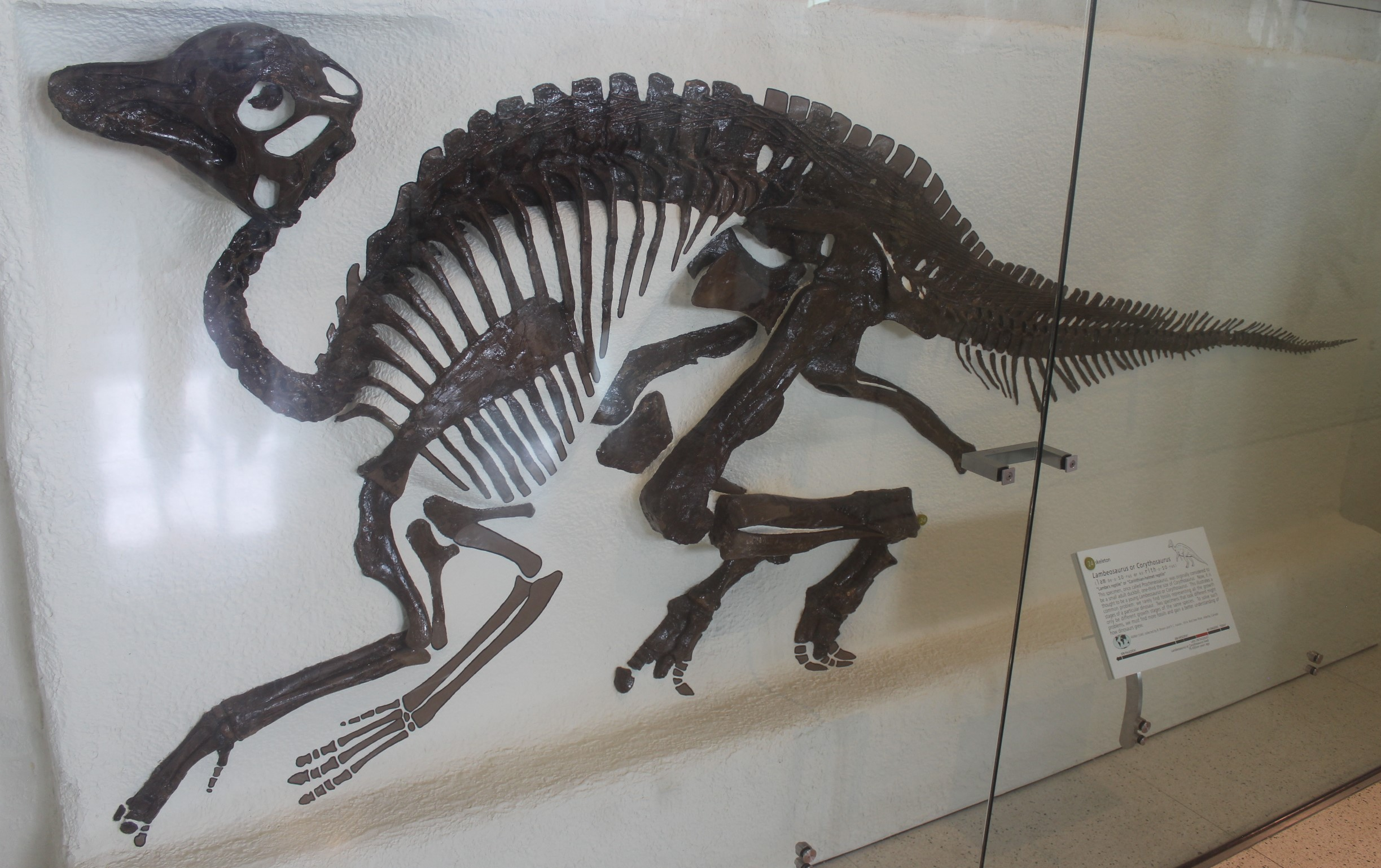
Type specimen of Procheneosaurus AMNH 5340

Lull and Wright considered the description of Procheneosaurus to be sufficient for the name to be valid rather than a nomen nudum, and that it could not be distinguished from Tetragonosaurus on a generic level, where Procheneosaurus would have priority by 11 years. They also stated that Parks named Tetragonosaurus under the belief that Procheneosaurus was invalid. (Note: Parks never mentioned "Procheneosaurus" in his 1931 study as suggested by Lull and Wright) Because Tetragonosaurus was a synonym of Procheneosaurus, and because Procheneosaurus was named without a species, they established Procheneosaurus praeceps as the type species. Consequently, Lull and Wright also created the new combinations Procheneosaurus erectofrons and Procheneosaurus cranibrevis for the other former species of Tetragonosaurus. Trachodon altidens was also assigned to Procheneosaurus, as P. altidens. This treatment was upheld by a petition by Lull to the International Commission on Zoological Nomenclature, which ruled in favour of Procheneosaurus in 1947 as a valid name with seniority over Tetragonosaurus, and that P. praeceps would be the type species that also includes AMNH 5340, the original Procheneosaurus specimen. The commission also considered that Tetragonosaurus was not an available name due to lacking a clearly designated type species. In addition to their type specimens (ROM 3577 for P. praeceps, ROM 3578 for P. erectofrons, CMN 8633 for P. cranibrevis and CMN 1092 for P. altidens), Lull and Wright also assigned AMNH 5461 and AMNH 5469 to P. erectofrons, which were collected by Brown in Montana in 1916 and included a skull and much of a skeleton, as well as a partial skeleton, respectively.

The hadrosaur taxonomy of Lull and Wright was followed by American palaeontologist John Ostrom in the early 1960s, who described the skulls of the different Lambeosaurus and Procheneosaurus species, and assigned the fragmentary species Hadrosaurus paucidens to Lambeosaurus, as Lambeosaurus paucidens. The use of Procheneosaurus was furthered by Russian palaeontologist Anatoly K. Rozhdestvensky in 1968, who described the new species Procheneosaurus convincens for an almost complete skeleton and skull from Kazakhstan (PIN 2230), demonstrating links between the Asian and North American faunas. This specimen had been found in 1961 north of Tashkent, as the most complete dinosaur discovered in Kazakhstan, and came from the Santonian aged Dabrazinskaya Svita. However, C.M. Sternberg had opposed in 1953 the use of Procheneosaurus over Tetragonosaurus as advocated by Lull and Wright, instead retaining all the species in the latter genus and believing "Procheneosaurus" to be a nomen nudum as suggested by Matthew.

=== Identification of juveniles ===
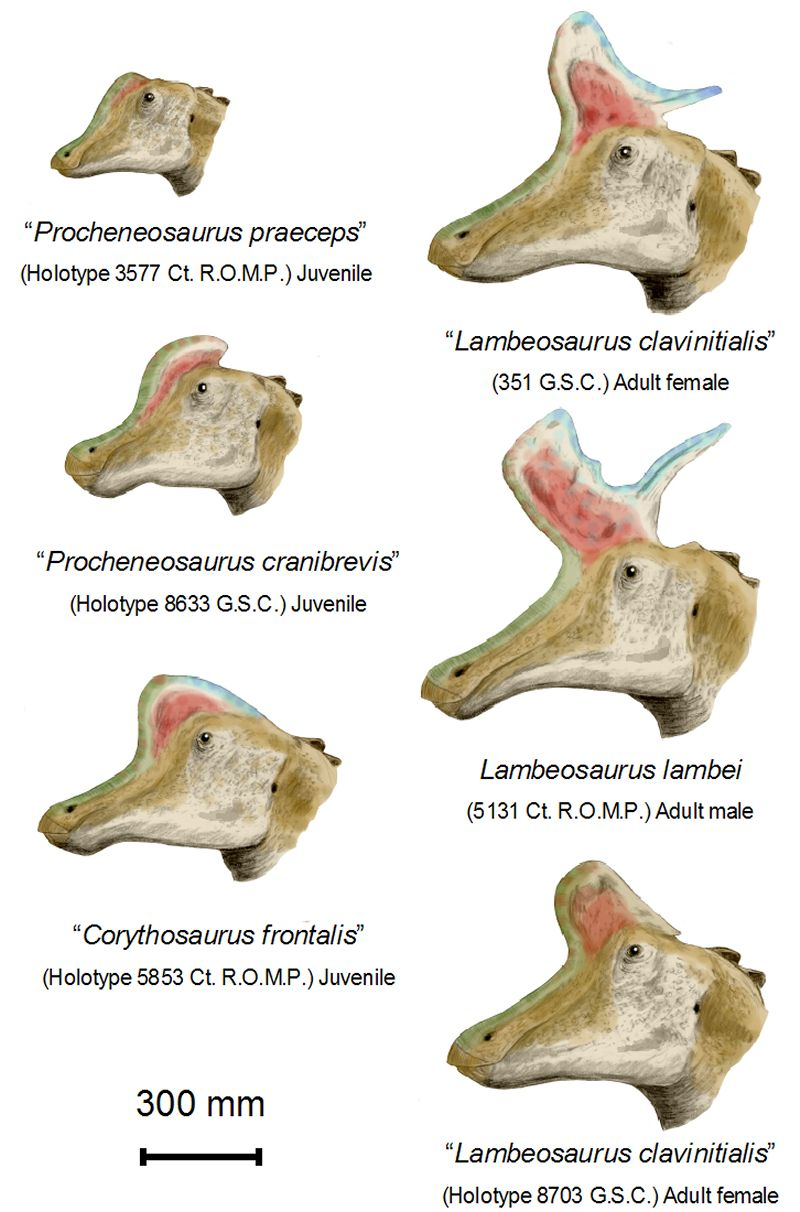
Profiles of various specimens, once assigned to their own species, interpreted by Dodson as different growth stages and sexes of L. lambei

In 1975, American palaeontologist Peter Dodson assessed how crest shape changed during growth (ontogeny) in lambeosaurines based on comparisons with modern reptiles and by assuming that smaller individuals were younger. Dodson reassessed the 12 named species of Lambeosaurus, Procheneosaurus and Corythosaurus believed to have lived together in the Oldman Formation (historic Belly River series), analysing the crests of a total of 36 individuals. He also commented on the status of Hypacrosaurus and coexisting Cheneosaurus from the Horseshoe Canyon Formation. These specimens showed extreme variation in their crests which led Dodson to conclude that the crest itself is a poor indicator of identity if age and sex are not taken into account. He found that the smaller Procheneosaurus specimens were juveniles of the larger Lambeosaurus and Corythosaurus specimens, with Procheneosaurus praeceps being a juvenile form of Lambeosaurus lambei and Procheneosaurus erectofrons and P. cranibrevis being juvenile forms of Corythosaurus. Lambeosaurus magnicristatus remained distinct. Dodson also proposed that variation among individuals of the same size was due to sexual dimorphism, resulting in the identifications of ROM 869, CMN 351, YPM 3222 and CMN 8503 (Note: Previously types of Corythosaurus frontalis and Lambeosaurus clavinitialis, and assigned specimens of L. clavinitialis and C. intermedius respectively) as females of L. lambei, and CMN 2869, ROM 1218, ROM 5131, AMNH 5353 and AMNH 5373 (Note: All previously assigned to Lambeosaurus lambei) as males of L. lambei. L. magnicristatus was represented by one male and one female individual, the type CMN 8705 and Royal Tyrrell Museum specimen 1966.04.1, respectively.

Dodson's interpretation of the low-crested "cheneosaurs" (Cheneosaurus and Procheneosaurus) as juveniles of Lambeosaurus, Corythosaurus, and Hypacrosaurus was followed by subsequent studies, with some slight adjustments. American palaeontologist James A. Hopson suggested that L. clavinitialis could represent female individuals of L. magnicristatus rather than L. lambei. Polish palaeontologists Teresa Maryańska and Halszka Osmólska concluded that P. convincens is likely a separate species and identified it as "Procheneosaurus" convincens in 1981. American palaeontologist William J. Morris even argued that there is very little that separates Lambeosaurus, Corythosaurus, and Hypacrosaurus beyond the anatomy of the skull, preventing a confident identification of any material that lacks the skull. In 1981, Morris described specimens excavated from the El Gallo Formation of Baja California between 1968 and 1974 as a new species that he tentatively assigned to Lambeosaurus as ?Lambeosaurus laticaudus, the type specimen of which is LACM 17715. The assignment of this species to Lambeosaurus was tentative given the similarity between Lambeosaurus and its close relatives. In 1979, American palaeontologist John R. Horner assigned partial jaw bones from the Bearpaw Formation of Montana to L. magnicristatus, representing the first lambeosaur specimen from marine sediments.

In a 1990 review of the Hadrosauridae by American palaeontologists David B. Weishampel and Horner, Lambeosaurus was considered to include L. lambei, L. magnicristatus, and ?L. laticaudus as diagnostic species', while Tetragonosaurus praeceps, L. clavinitialis, and Corythosaurus frontalis were synonyms of L. lambei. They also considered Didanodon and Procheneosaurus as synonyms of Lambeosaurus, while the other species described by Lambe (T. selwyni, T. altidens and T. marginatus) and the species Hadrosaurus paucidens were undiagnostic hadrosaurids that could not be synonymized with Lambeosaurus. Procheneosaurus convincens was listed as a juvenile of Jaxartosaurus aralensis, and T. erectofrons and T. cranibrevis were listed as juveniles of Corythosaurus. British and American palaeontologists David B. Norman and Hans-Dieter Sues, on the other hand, argued that Jaxartosaurus was too separate in time and space from Procheneosaurus convincens, and that although its validity was questionable, it could not be assigned to any known genera.

=== Redescriptions of species ===
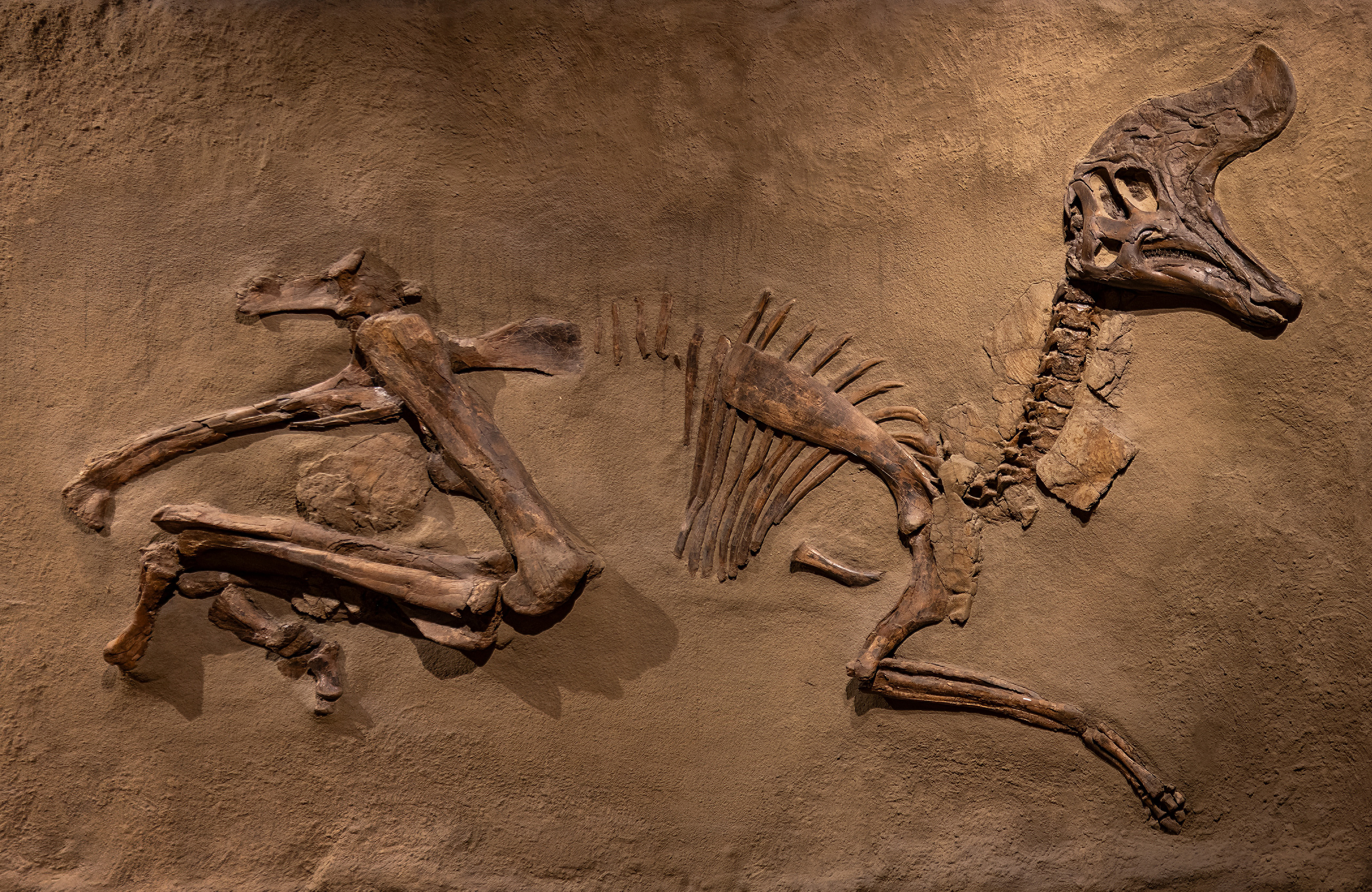
Wall-mounted skeleton of L. magnicristatus TMP 1966.04.1

The taxonomy of Weishampel and Horner was reiterated in the 2004 review of Hadrosauridae by Horner and colleagues. In 2005, Canadian paleontologist David C. Evans revisited the taxonomy of the species of Tetragonosaurus with a more detailed description of T. erectofrons. Dodson had not included the type specimen of T. erectofrons in his analysis of lambeosaurs due to its incomplete skull. Evans and colleagues identified features that separated Corythosaurus from Lambeosaurus regardless of age, facilitating the assessments of the juveniles. They were able to identify diagnostic traits of Corythosaurus in T. erectofrons and a specimen assigned to T. cranibrevis. However, the type of T. cranibrevis showed the anatomy of Lambeosaurus, making the species a synonym of Lambeosaurus rather than Corythosaurus.

While L. lambei was well documented by the descriptions of skulls and skeletons of different ontogenetic stages, L. magnicristatus remained the only lambeosaurine from Alberta without a description of its skeleton. Evans and Canadian palaeontologist Robert R. Reisz redescribed L. magnicristatus in 2007. The type, CMN 8705, was originally a largely complete skeleton and skull when excavated, but was significantly damaged by water while it was stored and before it could be prepared, and much of the limbs and girdles had to be discarded. Evans and Reisz therefore based their redescription mostly on TMP 1966.04.1, which was originally discovered by C.M. Sternberg in 1937, around 11 km (7 mi) southeast of Manyberries, Alberta. This specimen was originally excavated for the Canadian Museum of Nature, but was given to the Provincial Museum and Archives of Alberta in 1966, which later became the Royal Tyrrell Museum. When first discovered, the left side was exposed and had been badly weathered, probably over hundreds of years. To preserve it, Sternberg reinforced the skeleton with plaster and then jacketed it into five separate blocks that were shipped in straw-packed wooden crates to Ottawa. After being acquired by the PMAA, it was prepared for exhibition, with the better-preserved right side being exposed and bolted into a large wooden frame with styrofoam blocks cut out to hold it in place. The 2007 redescription showed that L. magnicristatus can be separated from L. lambei based on its anatomy as well as on its geologically younger age. It also raised the question of whether L. clavinitialis were individuals of L. lambei or belonged to a separate species, though this required further study. Including all specimens, the skeletons of L. lambei and L. clavinitialis are completely known, and the known skeleton of L. magnicristatus is 81% complete.

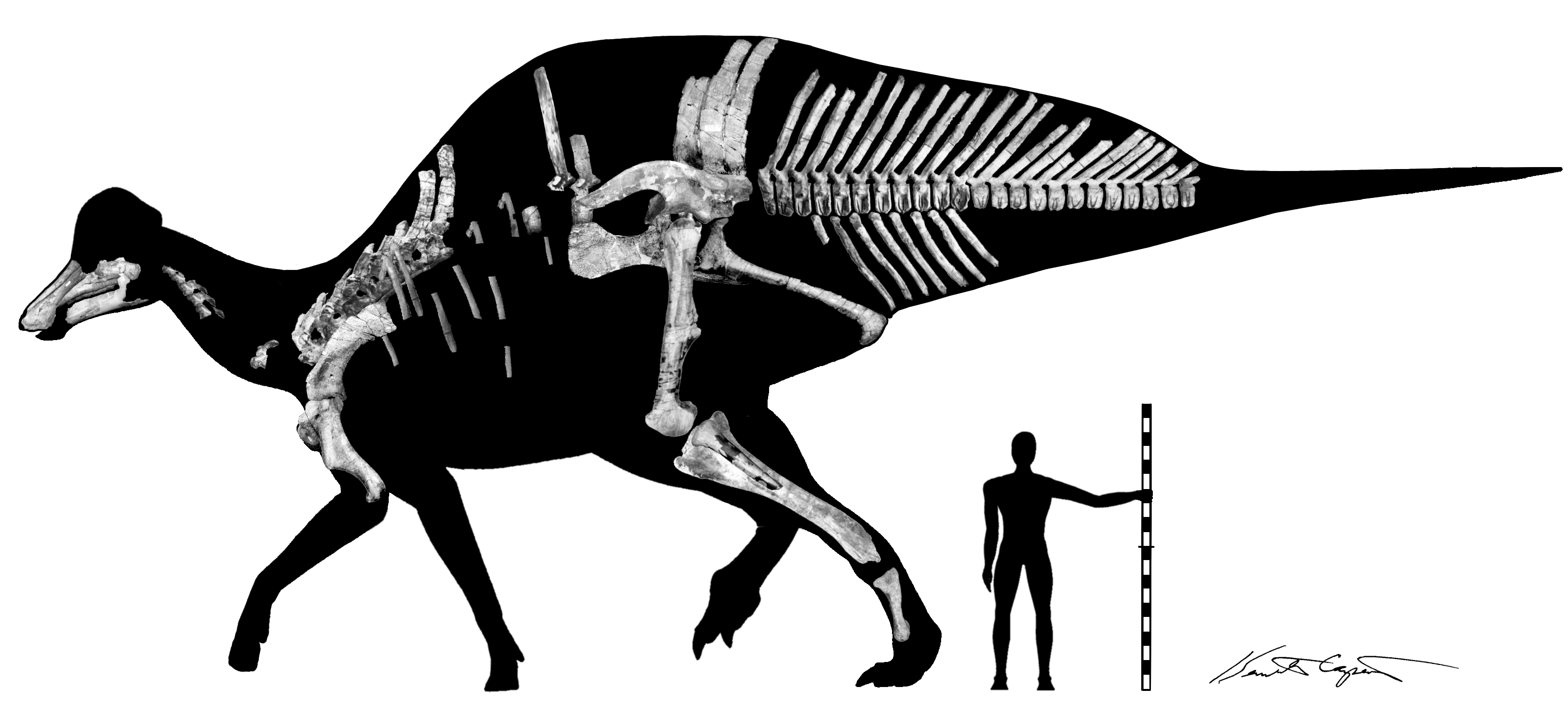
Skeleton of Magnapaulia, previously L. laticaudus

The question whether L. clavinitialis represents a separate species was also considered by Evans in other studies, with new stratigraphic data suggesting that there is a temporal separation between L. lambei and L. clavinitialis. Though they could still represent chronospecies (a single evolutionary lineage that gradually changes through time), it is unlikely that they represent different sexes of the same species. As a result, L. clavinitialis has been recognised as a separate species in subsequent studies, known from five specimens in the middle Campanian, (Note: AMNH 5382, ROM 869, CMN 8703, YPM 3222 and TMP 1981.37.1) while L. lambei is known from 11 specimens from the middle and late Campanian, (Note: AMNH 5353, AMNH 5373, CMN 351, CMN 2869, CMN 8503, ROM 794, ROM 1218, FMNH 380, FMNH 1479, TMP 1982.38.1, and TMP 1997.012.0128) and some specimens cannot be identified to the species level. A 2022 phylogenetic analysis by Hai Xing and colleagues found L. clavinitialis to be basal to L. lambei and L. magnicristatus, which are sister taxa, and Canadian palaeontologist Kristin S. Brink and colleagues found in 2014 that the crest morphometrics of L. clavinitialis differ significantly from L. lambei and L. magnicristatus.

In 2012, Spanish palaeontologist Albert Prieto-Márquez and colleagues redescribed the material of ?L. laticaudus, which was found to be closest to Velafrons, the only other lambeosaurine known from Mexico at the time. It was more distant from the species of Lambeosaurus, and showed enough anatomical differences that they gave it the new genus name Magnapaulia. Similarly, the skull of Procheneosaurus convincens was redescribed by Brink and Canadian palaeontologists Phil R. Bell in 2013, who found that it could be differentiated from other lambeosaurines of similar age including Jaxartosaurus, giving if the new genus name Kazaklambia. It has been found to be an early member of Lambeosaurini and only distantly related to Lambeosaurus.

== Description ==
Life restoration of L. lambei

Lambeosaurus is primarily distinguished from other hadrosaurids by its skull and crest, otherwise being very close in anatomy to its close relatives Corythosaurus and Hypacrosaurus. It was a large hadrosaurid, with highly developed jaws full of grinding teeth, a long tail stiffened by ossified tendons that prevented it from drooping, and more elongate limbs suggesting they were semi-quadrupedal (could move on both two legs and all fours), as also shown by footprints of related animals. The hands had four fingers, lacking the thumb, and while the second, third, and fourth fingers were bunched together, the little finger was free and could have been used to manipulate objects. Each foot had only the three central toes. L. lambei, L. magnicristatus, and L. clavinitialis would have reached around 7–7.7 m (23–25 ft) in length, and 2.6–3.4 t (2.6–3.3 long tons; 2.9–3.7 short tons) in weight. This is comparable to all species of Corythosaurus and Hypacrosaurus which were around 8 m (26 ft) in length and 3 t (3.0 long tons; 3.3 short tons), and makes them the largest lambeosaurines except for Magnapaulia. Lambeosaurus is also one of many hadrosaurs to preserve the impressions of skin, which has been found across the neck, pelvis, legs, and tail.

=== Skull ===
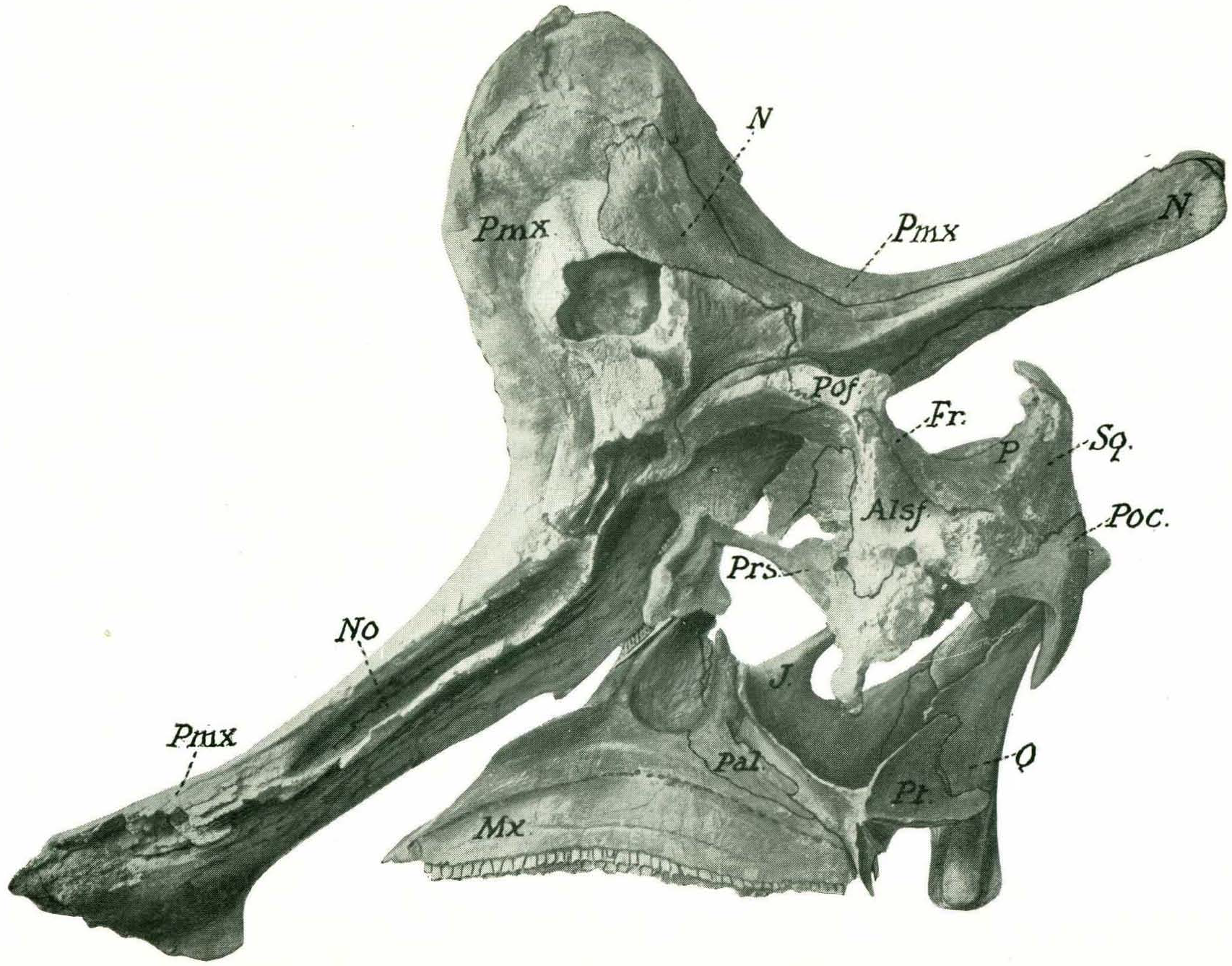
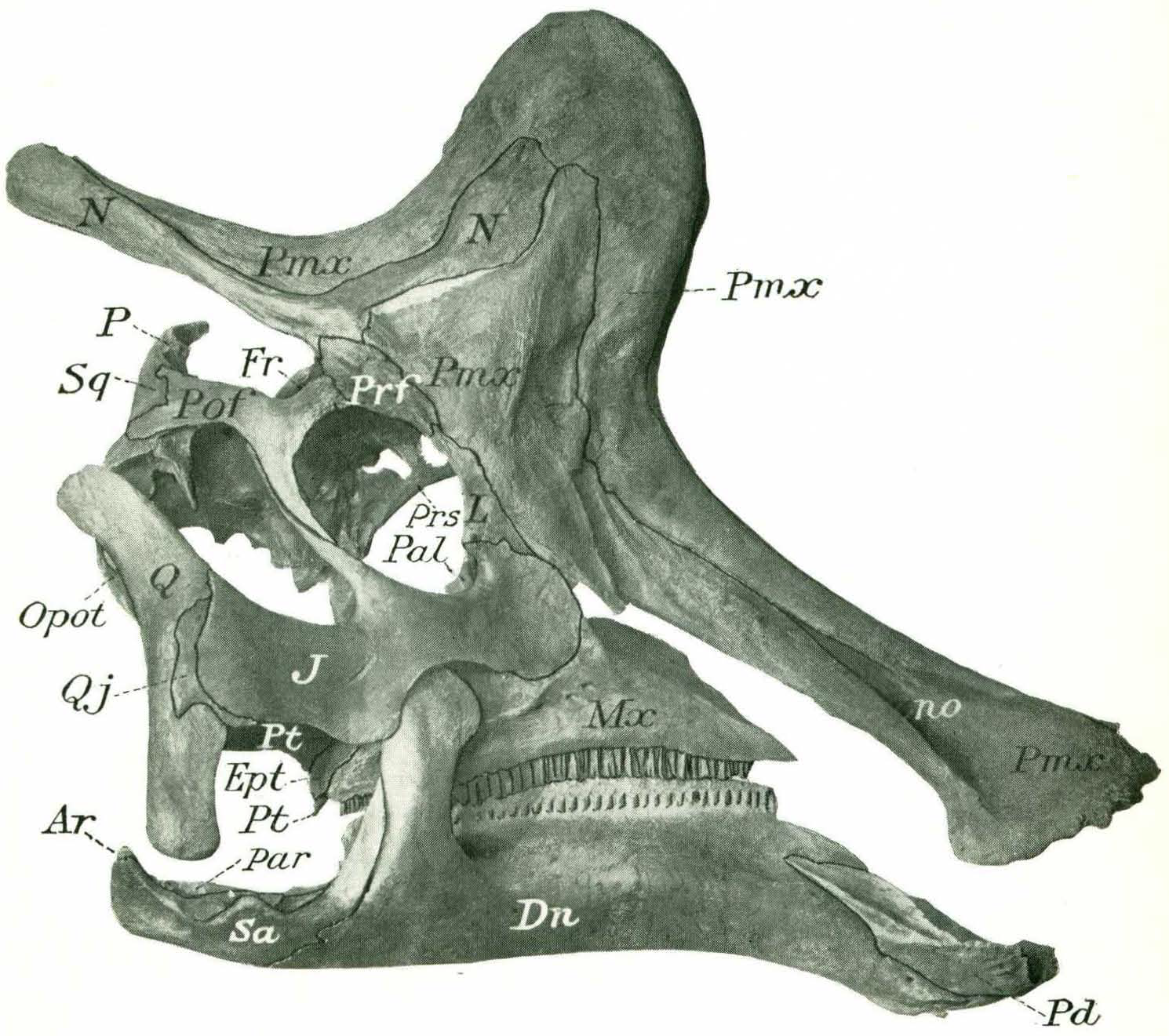
Skull of L. lambei type CMN 2869

The skull of Lambeosaurus is particularly distinct, bearing an elaborate, narrow and tall crest. The form of the crest is variable between individuals, sexes, and ages, but is consistently perpendicular to the snout. Almost all of the crest is formed by the premaxillae of the snout, which have elongated and expanded over the skull in a way that has rearranged the other bones of the skull roof. A rear "spur" is seen in L. lambei and L. clavinitialis, but absent in L. magnicristatus, which is formed by the nasals. The crest is particularly pronounced in L. magnicristatus, where it is expanded into a large, rounded profile and overhangs the snout. The crest in L. lambei and L. clavinitialis is less pronounced, with a hatchet shape that is at its greatest height above the eye, and a posterior spike that is more pronounced in L. lambei than L. clavinitialis. The composition of the crest is similar between Lambeosaurus and Corythosaurus, but in the latter, the premaxillae extend between two branches of the nasal, which allows for separating individuals of the two genera at even the youngest ages before their crests develop different forms. Inside the crests there are S-shaped looping passages that connect the external nares (nostrils) with the internal nares, which expand the crest on either side. On the sides of the crest above the nostril, where the branches of the premaxilla and nasal meet, there is an unossified region (fontanelle) that reduces in size during growth; once fully ossified, the crest might not have been able to change shape further.

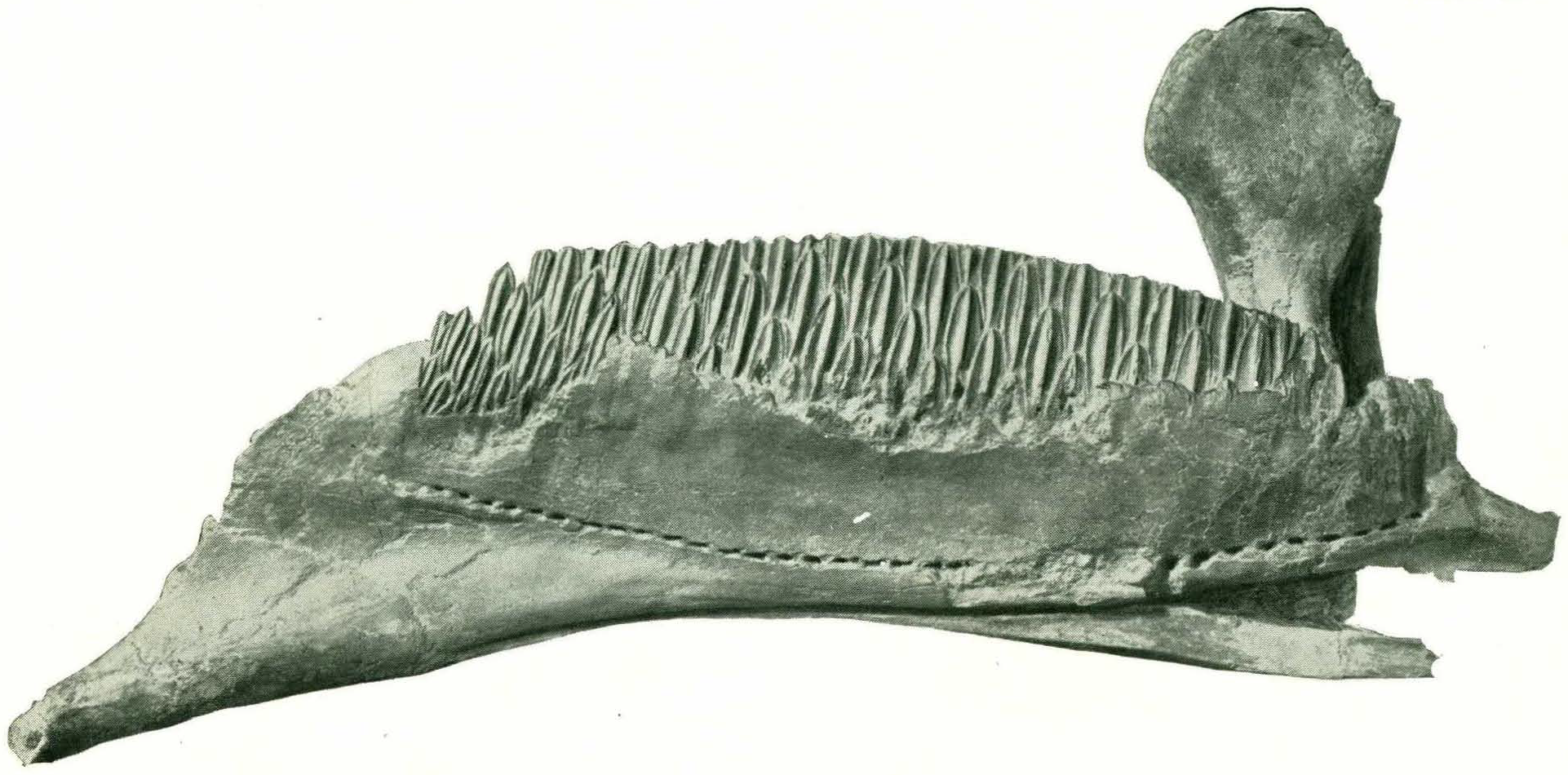
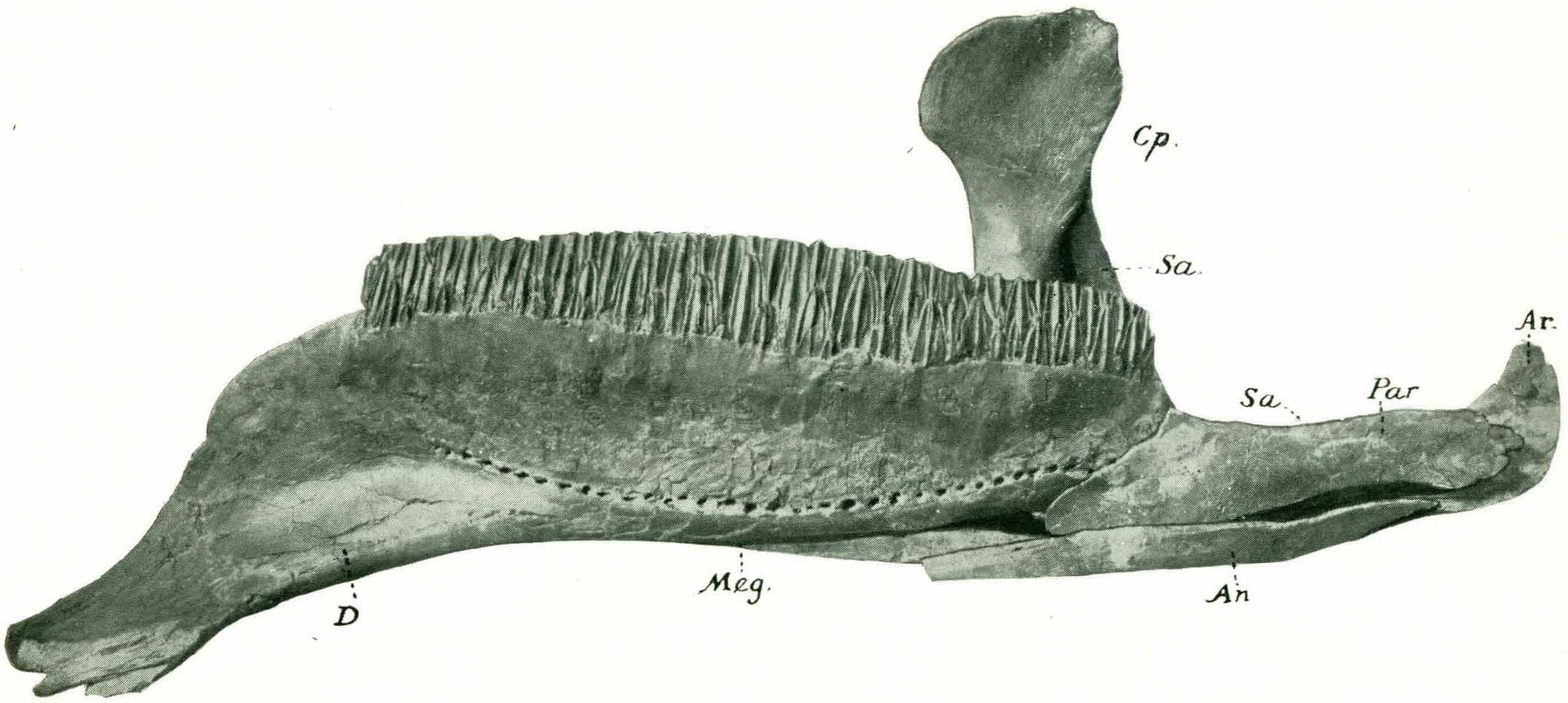
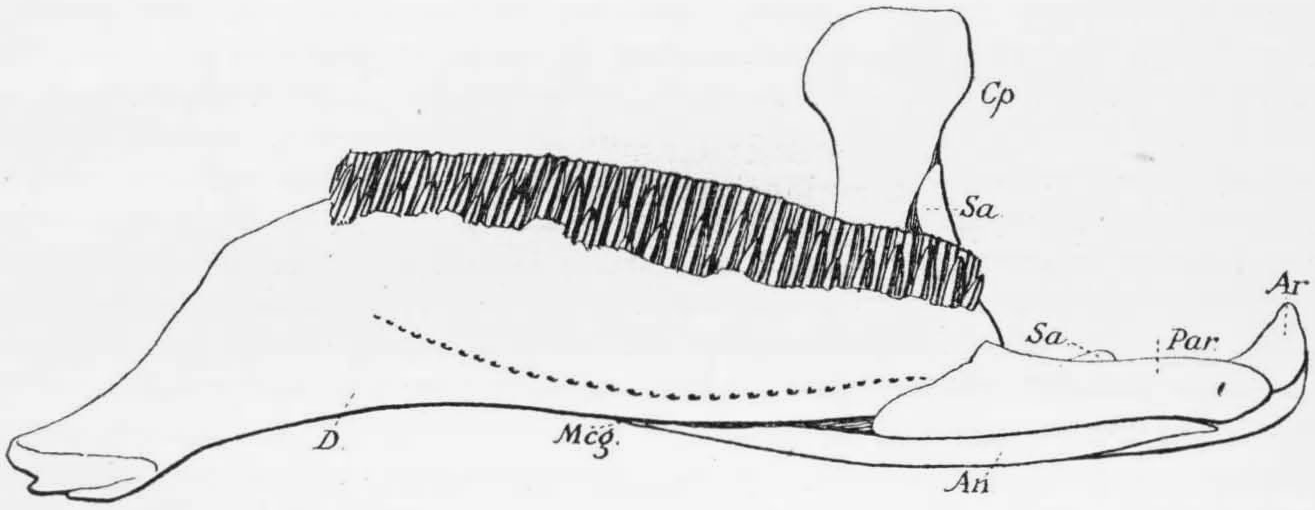
Mandibles of L. clavinitialis CMN 351 (top) and L. lambei CMN 2869 (bottom two)

Beyond the crest, the snout consisted entirely of the premaxillae, which surround the entire external naris (bony nostril). Beneath, it is braced by the maxilla, which is large and contained 39 to 40 uniform teeth in a closely-packed dental battery. To the rear, the maxilla articulated with the jugal and lacrimal of the face, as well as the bones of the palate. The lacrimal is very small and subrectangular as in other lambeosaurines, and only contributes to a part of the front margin of the orbit. The jugal is large and flat, forming the entire bottom margin of the orbit as well as the infratemporal fenestra. The jugal and postorbital together separate the orbit and infratemporal fenestra, and at the rear of the skull the jugal forms an overlapping joint with both the quadratojugal and quadrate. Above the orbit is the nasal, which forms parts of the crest's sides and has an extensive articulation with the premaxilla, and also articulates with the prefrontal and frontal. The prefrontal forms the upper margin of the orbit between the lacrimal and the postorbital, completely excluding the frontal from the margin. The frontal is slightly domed as in other lambeosaurines, and forms a platform that supports the rear of the crest. It articulates with the nasal and prefrontal in front, the postorbital to the side, and the parietal to the rear. The parietals and squamosals surround the supratemporal fenestra with the postorbitals, and also support the quadrates behind the infratemporal fenestra. The quadrate forms the rear margin of the skull as a tall bone that ends in the jaw joint. The braincase is made up by many fused bones with consistent anatomy between Lambeosaurus, Corythosaurus, and Hypacrosaurus, though in Lambeosaurus the ophthalmic nerve is enclosed by bone to form a tunnel while in the other genera it is exposed as a groove. The occipital condyle for articulation between the head and neck is reniform in shape, and the paired paroccipital processes are flared away from the midline of the skull.

The lower jaw in Lambeosaurus is made up of the dentary, surangular, and angular on the outer surface, the splenial, prearticular, and articular on the inner surface, and capped at the front by an unpaired predentary. The predentary is crescentric, forming the joint between the two dentaries, and with an irregular, sharp, cutting edge to support the horn of a beak. The dentary is large, with an elongate and downturned region at the front that lacked teeth similar to Corythosaurus and Hypacrosaurus, followed by an extensive tooth battery as in the maxilla that contains 40 or 41 vertical columns of up to three functional teeth each. At the rear of the dentary is a very elevated coronoid process that slots on the inside of the jugal when the jaws closed. The surangular is the larger of the bones behind the dentary, with a robust central region supporting the jaw joint and a shallow but distinct triangular depression for muscle attachment. The angular is long and splint-like, forming the bottom margin of the jaw below the surangular and behind the dentary. The prearticular is a thin bone bracing the surangular and angular from the inside of the jaw, as well as the articular, which forms the remainder of the jaw joint between the surangular and prearticular. The teeth of both jaws are typical for lambeosaurines, being very tall relative to their width, having very faint crenellations along their edges, and showing a single strong keel along the center. Only one side of the tooth crowns is ornamented and bears enamel for use in chewing (outer side in the maxilla, inner side in the dentary), with the other side embedded in the jaw bones to form columns of functional teeth that compose the dental battery.

=== Postcranial skeleton ===
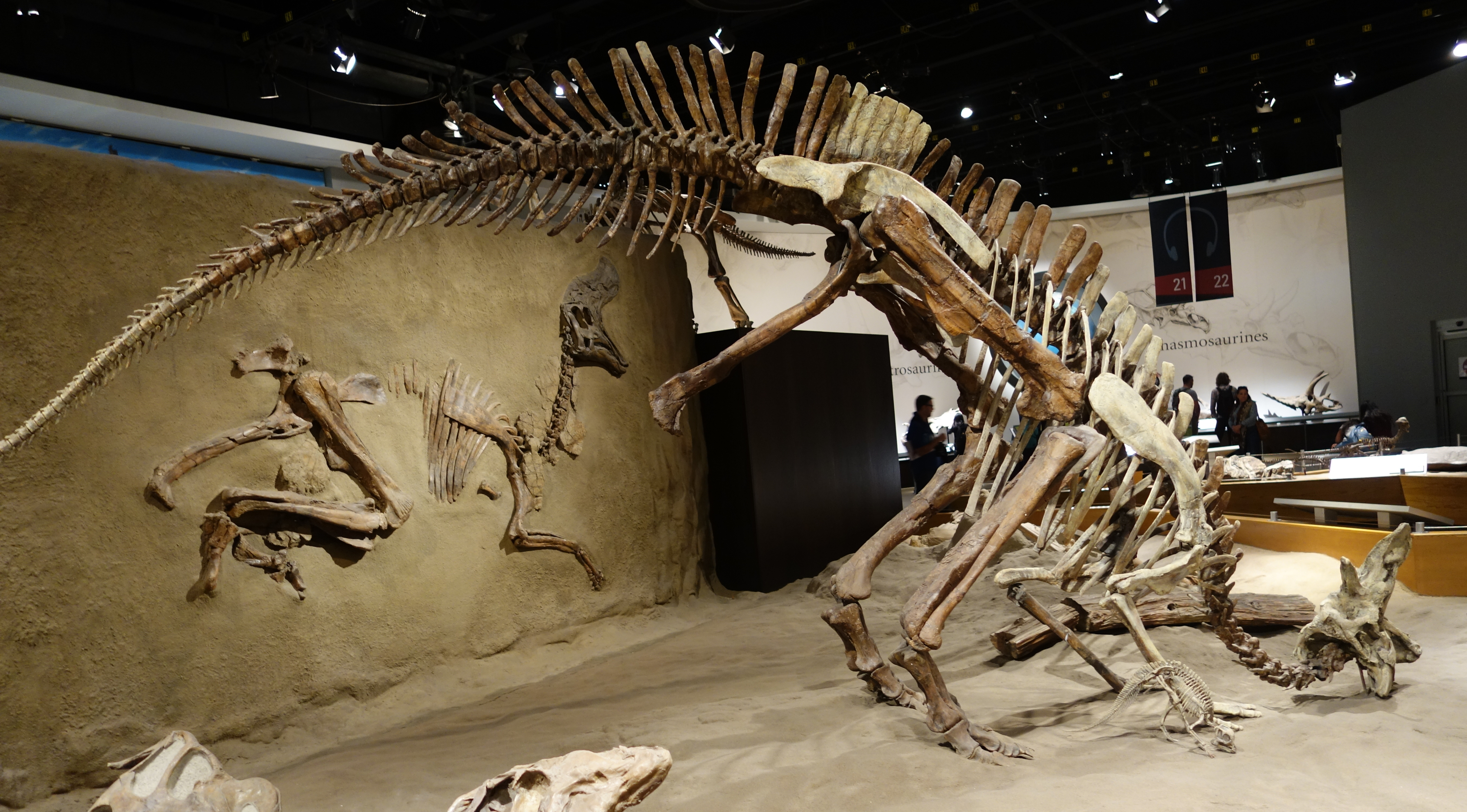
Mounted skeleton of L. lambei specimen TMP 1982.38.1

Lambeosaurus is known from several completely but briefly described skeletons, and while no features of the skeleton can distinguish it as a genus from Corythosaurus and Hypacrosaurus, the pubic bone differs between the species: while in L. lambei, Corythosaurus and Hypacrosaurus it is bulbous with a large expansion in front of the hip joint, in L. magnicristatus this expansion is much smaller. The neck of Lambeosaurus bears 14 or 15 cervical vertebrae, which is fewer than in Olorotitan but more than in Parasaurolophus. They are generally consistent in form along the neck, with the exception of the first two cervicals which are specialized for supporting the skull with a taller neural spine above the vertebral body. The spines of the following cervicals are nearly absent, though the articulations between vertebrae are strong and opisthocoelous (concave-convex) as in other hadrosaurids. The cervical vertebrae are very consistent in length, only varying between 75 and 82 mm (3.0 and 3.2 in) in L. magnicristatus specimen TMP 1966.04.1. There were 15 to 16 dorsal vertebrae present in the torso, with the spines much taller than in the cervicals and rectangular. The vertebrae of the tail have hexagonal articular faces, as in other hadrosaurids.

The scapula in the shoulder girdle is an elongate, flat bone, 781 mm (30.7 in) long in TMP 1966.04.1 and gently curved as in Corythosaurus. The surface of the bone is relatively smooth, except for a large crest near the shoulder joint that serves to anchor muscles in the region. The sternum is hatchet-shaped as in other hadrosaurids. The humerus is relatively shorter than in Corythosaurus, but is still the most massive bone of the arm. It bears a large crest for the deltopectoral muscles (the Deltopectoral crest) that extends for half the length of the bone, before sharply merging into the shaft of the bone. The radius and ulna are longer than the humerus as in other lambeosaurines, but are more robust than in Corythosaurus. While the ulna is one third longer than the humerus, it has very little expansion at the elbow or wrist. The hand is also more robust than in Corythosaurus, with longer digits relative to the metacarpals, making it similar to Parasaurolophus. The second digit is the longest of the hand, despite the third and fourth metacarpals being longer, and the second and third digits bore hooves, which would have faced slightly inwards when walking.

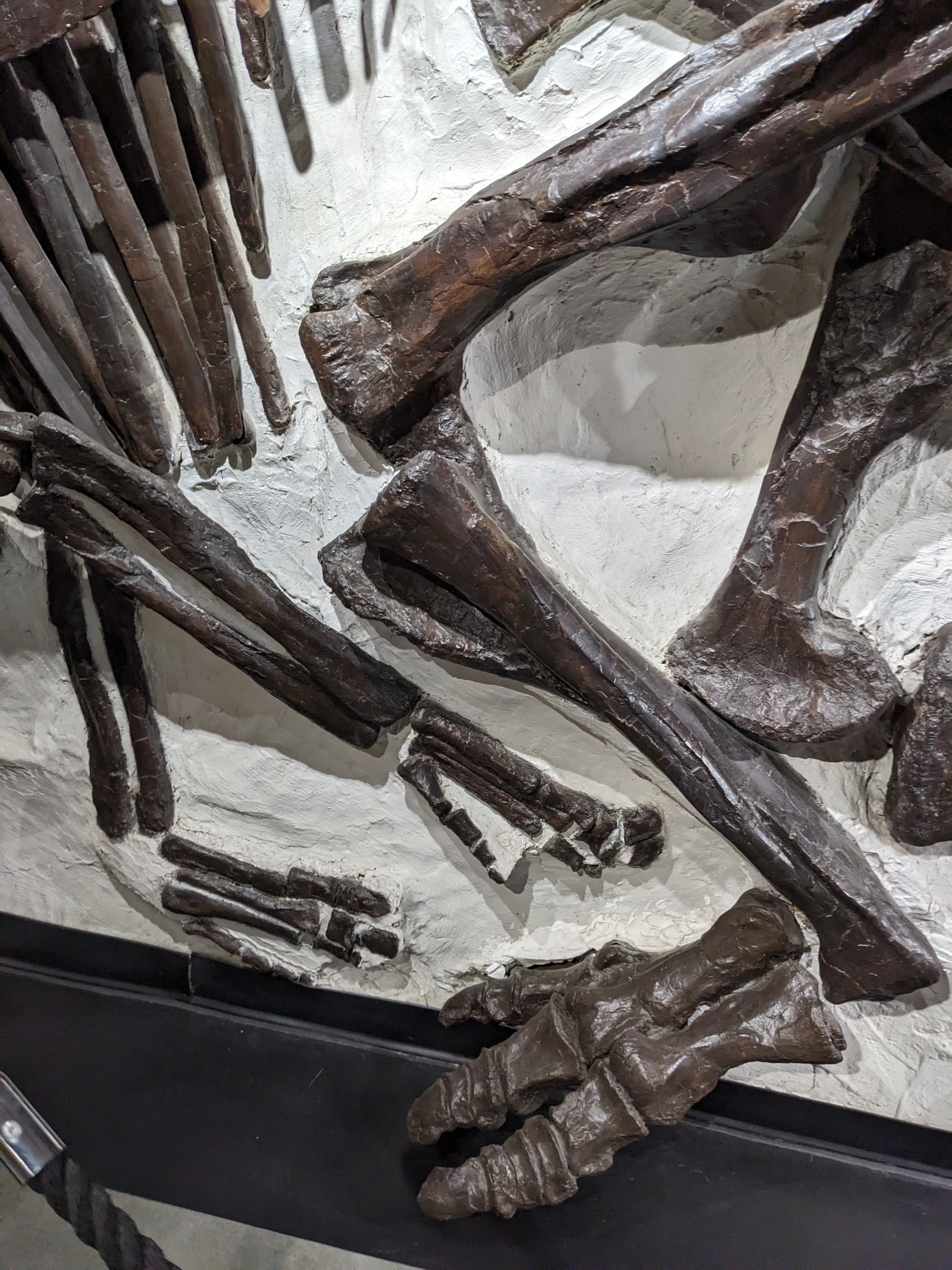
Hands and feet of Lambeosaurus skeleton, Pacific Museum of Earth

Pelvic material of Lambeosaurus has been suggested to be different from other hadrosaurs, but the variation within Hypacrosaurus and Maiasaura shows that these differences are probably individual and not related to species. The ilium is elongate, with a humped upper margin that bears a prominent shelf overhanging the hip joint. Multiple scars from muscle attachments can be seen on the surface, and the postacetabular (rear) process of the ilium is very similar between L. lambei, L. magnicristatus and Corythosaurus. The ischium is subequal in length to the femur, with a slightly sigmoid outline and more massive proportions than those of Corythosaurus. The shaft of the bone is straight, but there are expansions at either end. Near the hip joint, the ischium broadens to articulate with the pubis and ilium, and at the underside of this region of the pelvis the ischium is notched. The opposite end of the ischium is sharply expanded into a pendant foot, which, though large and unique to lambeosaurines, is smaller in Lambeosaurus species than in Parasaurolophus and Hypacrosaurus.

The femur is massive and columnar, and as in other hadrosaurids it is slightly longer than the tibia of the lower leg. It is broad, with deep ridges for muscle attachments including a strongly developed and semicircular fourth trochanter. The condyles for the knee articulation are expanded enough to fully enclose a tunnel for extensor ligaments, resulting in a long articular surface. The tibia is massive and does not differ from that of other hadrosaurids, with the upper third of its length taken up by the cnemial crest that forms an arc to brace the fibula from the front. The fibula is slender and the same length as the tibia, though its robustness is more similar to Hypacrosaurus than Corythosaurus. The femur is 1.02 m (3.3 ft) long in L. clavinitialis, while the humerus is 52.0 cm (20.5 in) and the ilium is 1.035 m (3.40 ft). The foot in hadrosaurids is reduced to only three digits, which each bear spade-shaped hooves.

=== Integument ===
Impressions of scales are known from three specimens of Lambeosaurus, the L. lambei specimen ROM 1218, the L. clavinitialis specimen CMN 8703, and the L. magnicristatus specimen TMP 1966.04.1. The location of the L. lambei impression on the body is unknown, but the scales are relatively large at 7–9 mm (0.28–0.35 in) in diameter. Unusually, this specimen also preserves a subcircular 12 mm (0.47 in) arrangement of feature scales (larger scales within a matrix of smaller scales) formed by eight wedge-shaped scales converging to one central point. The skin impressions of L. clavinitialis are extensive and remain in original position, covering the ribs and leg in front of the femur, the area over the hip, and the first 1.2 m (4 ft) of the tail. The scales are relatively small and undifferentiated in size or pattern, though the scales of the tail are slightly larger. The skin of the tail shows some slight folding, and the continuity of the skin from the torso to the side of the leg shows that the upper leg was enclosed within the body wall. Skin patches on L. magnicristatus were left in original position along the neck, forelimb, and leg, and are unusual in that they consist primarily of connected raised ridges, and thus may represent the natural casts of the original impressions. The pattern across all patches is consistent, with small polygonal scales around 5 mm (0.20 in) in diameter with no overlap or pattern to their arrangement. In Corythosaurus, enlarged dome-like scales are present on the leg, but these feature scales are absent in Lambeosaurus.

== Classification ==
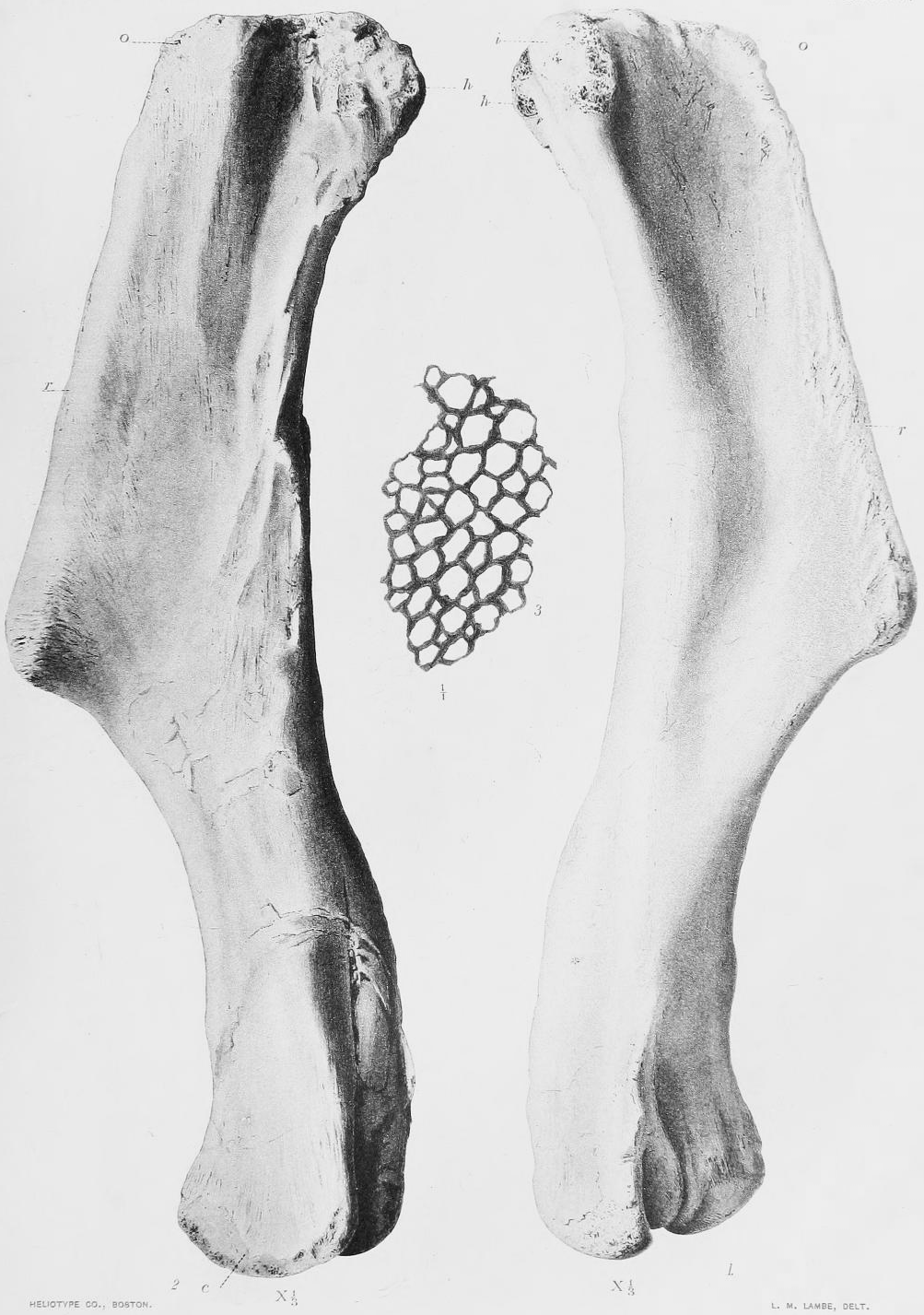
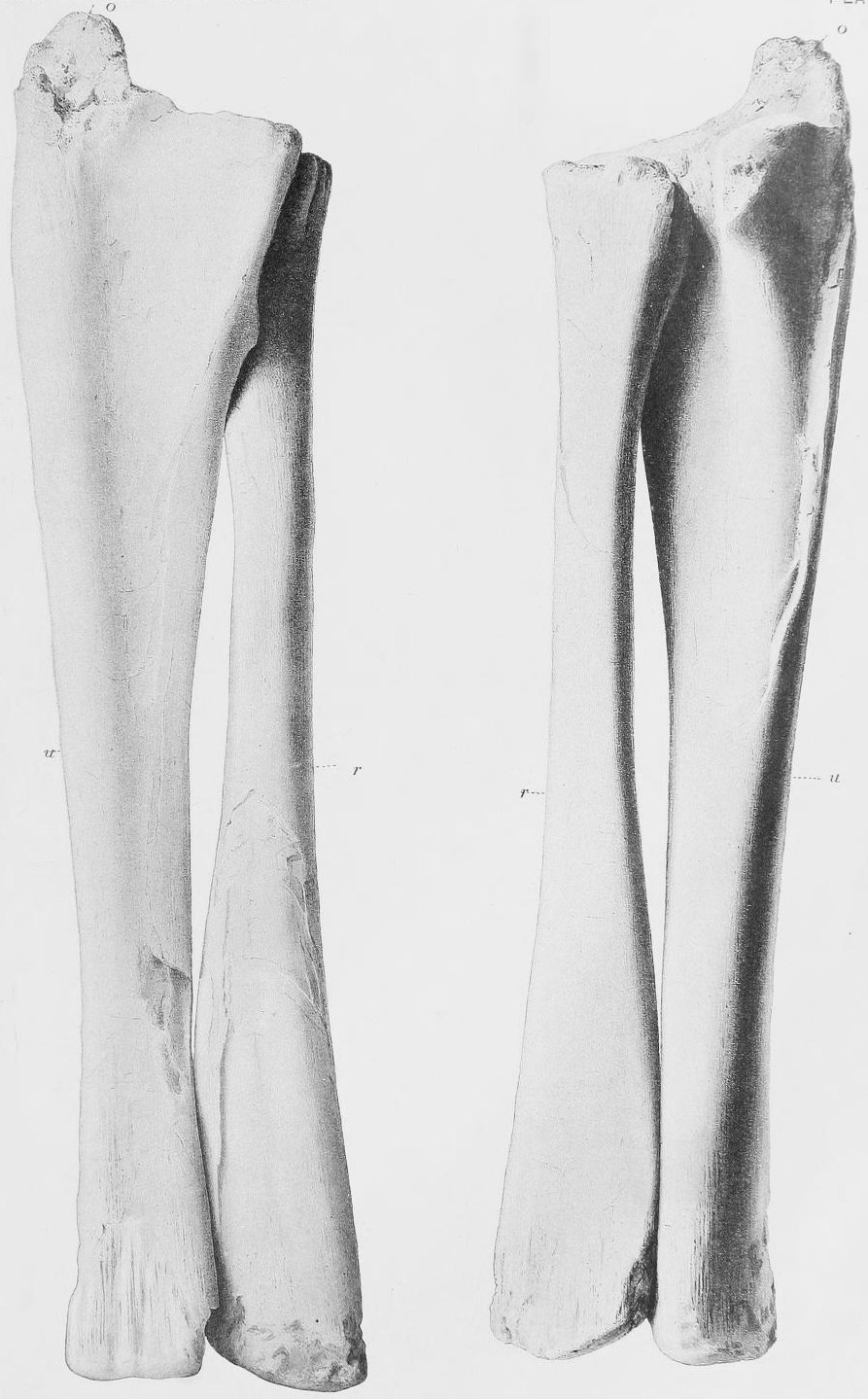
Forelimb bones and skin of Stephanosaurus marginatus, to which the skull of Lambeosaurus was previously assigned

Lambe assigned the initial Canadian hadrosaur discoveries to the family Trachodontidae, and, after better skull material was discovered, found that they most closely resemble Saurolophus. Upon describing Corythosaurus in 1914, Brown separated the crested genera and Saurolophus from Trachodon within the new subfamily Saurolophinae, which are united by a cranial crest. Lambe disagreed with the inclusion of Saurolophus as the crest in the genus was not made by the premaxillae, and named the new subfamily Stephanosaurinae in 1920 to accommodate Stephanosaurus (including the crested skulls), Corythosaurus, Hypacrosaurus, as well as Cheneosaurus. Saurolophus and Prosaurolophus were united within Brown's Saurolophinae, while all other members of Hadrosauridae (the preferred name for Trachodontidae) were within Hadrosaurinae. Upon recognizing that a new name was needed for the crested skulls of Lambe, Parks named Lambeosaurus and replaced Stephanosaurinae with Lambeosaurinae as no crested skull was now known for Stephanosaurus. Parks limited Lambeosaurinae to Lambeosaurus, Corythosaurus, and Cheneosaurus, but noted that Parasaurolophus showed some similarities as well. Gilmore revised the classifications of Hadrosauridae in 1924, where he noted that the limited material of Trachodon prevented identifying it as either a crested or non-crested hadrosaur and advocated for abandoning the family named after it, with Hadrosauridae composed of Hadrosaurinae, Saurolophinae, and a Lambeosaurinae that included Lambeosaurus, Corythosaurus, Parasaurolophus, Hypacrosaurus and Cheneosaurus. This classification was followed by Gilmore in 1933 who added the Mongolian genus Bactrosaurus to Lambeosaurinae, and by Anatoly Riabinin in 1939 who added the genus Jaxartosaurus from Kazakhstan.

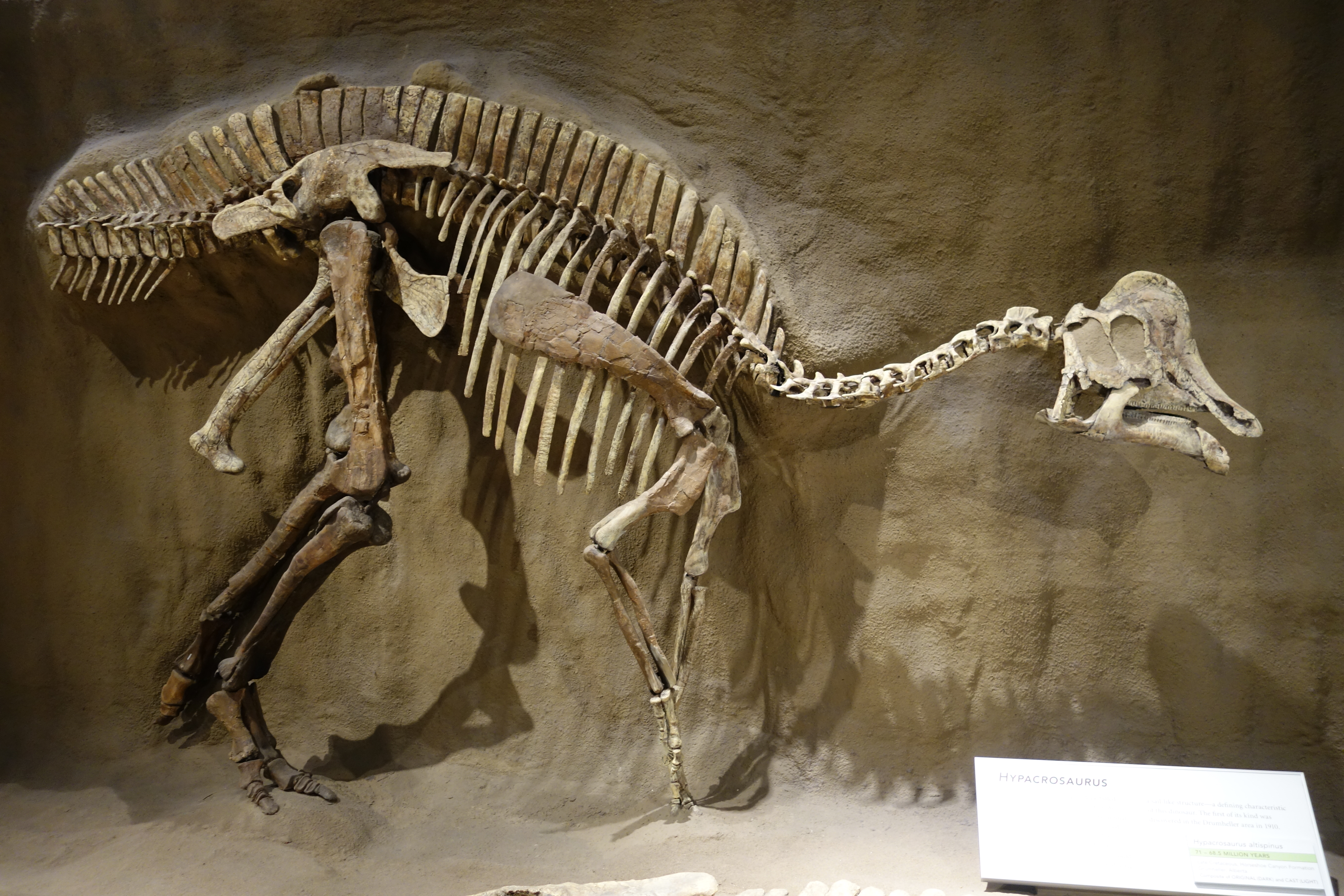
Skeleton of Hypacrosaurus altispinus, a close relative of Lambeosaurus

The review of North American Hadrosauridae by Lull and Wright in 1942 supported the three subfamilies separated by Gilmore, with Lambeosaurus, Corythosaurus, Hypacrosaurus, and Parasaurolophus forming Lambeosaurinae, but also chose to name a fourth subfamily, Cheneosaurinae, for Cheneosaurus and Procheneosaurus on behalf of their small size and limited crests. German palaeontologist Friedrich von Huene supported similar relationships in his classifications of hadrosaurs, but elevated the subfamilies to family rank creating Lambeosauridae in 1948 and Cheneosauridae in 1956. However, in 1953, C.M. Sternberg recognized that the divisions of previous studies were not useful as they were based on arbitrary decisions of feature significance, a problem that especially affected the separation of Cheneosaurinae from Lambeosaurinae. As a result, he condensed Hadrosauridae into only two subfamilies: Hadrosaurinae and Lambeosaurinae, with saurolophines being members of Hadrosaurinae, and cheneosaurines being members of Lambeosaurinae. Within Lambeosaurinae he included Lambeosaurus, Corythosaurus, Hypacrosaurus, Parasaurolophus, Cheneosaurus, Tetragonosaurus, and Trachodon; a classification he reiterated in 1954. Following the recognition of cheneosaurs as juveniles of Lambeosaurus, Corythosaurus, and Hypacrosaurus, American palaeontologist Michael K. Brett-Surman published a phylogeny of all accepted genera of Hadrosauridae in 1979, and expanded Lambeosaurinae to also include Tsintaosaurus, with Jaxartosaurus and Bactrosaurus as early members, and Lambeosaurus, Corythosaurus and Hypacrosaurus as one another's closest relatives. The 1990 review of hadrosaurs by Weishampel and Horner was unable to conclude if Tsintaosaurus was a lambeosaurine or hadrosaurine, but added the Asian genera Barsboldia and Nipponosaurus to Lambeosaurinae.

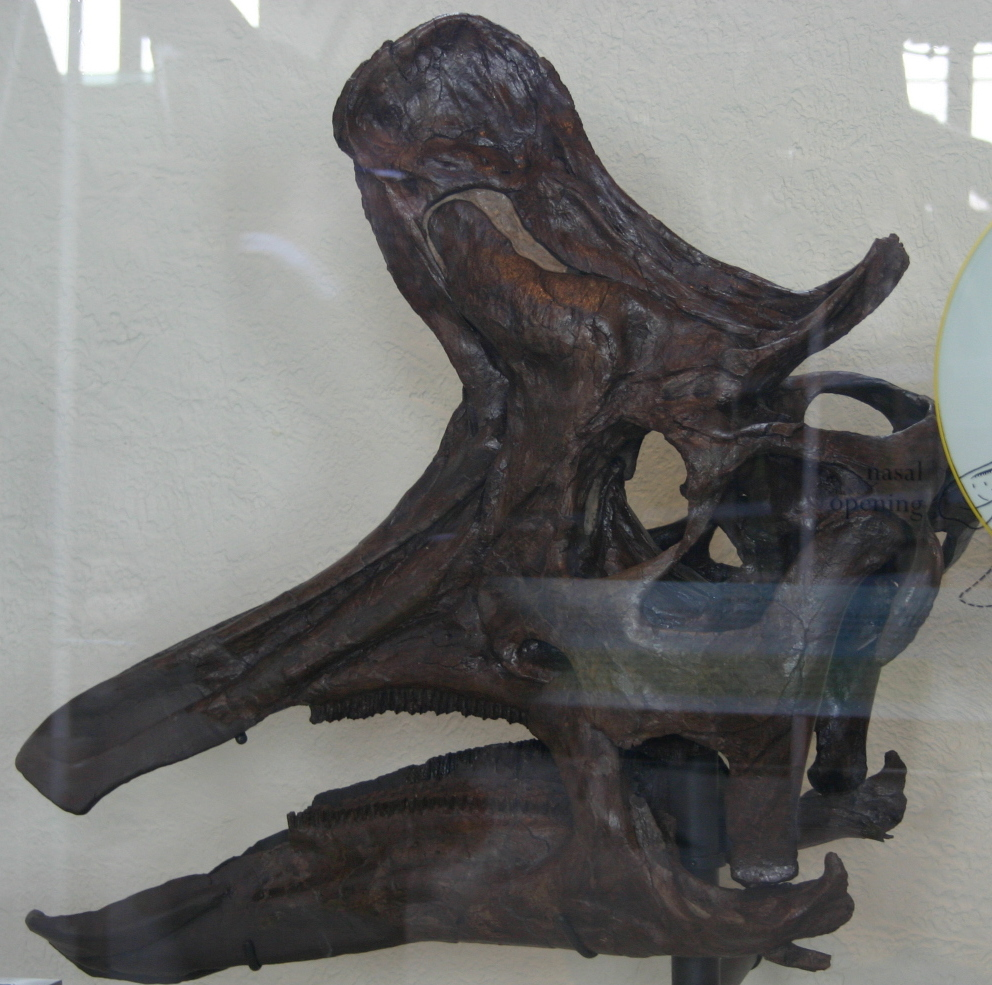
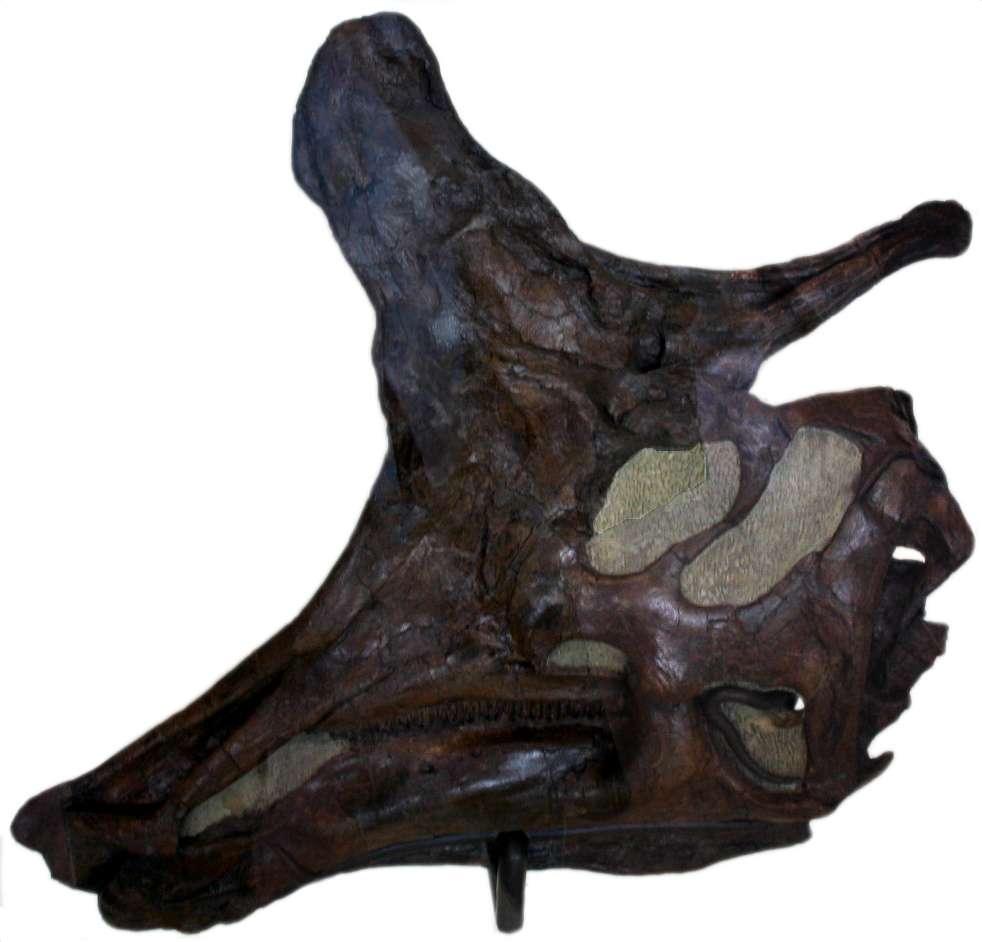
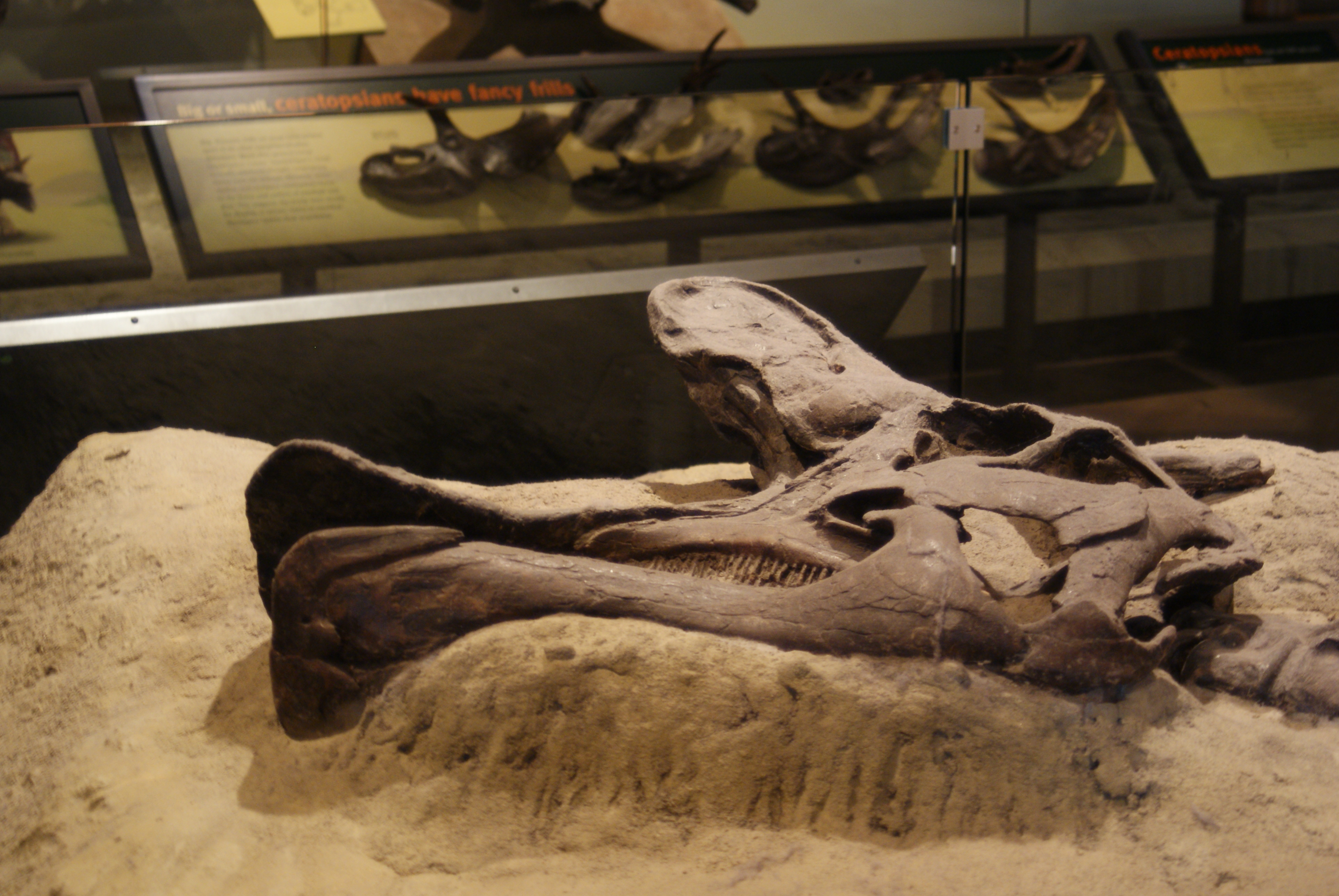
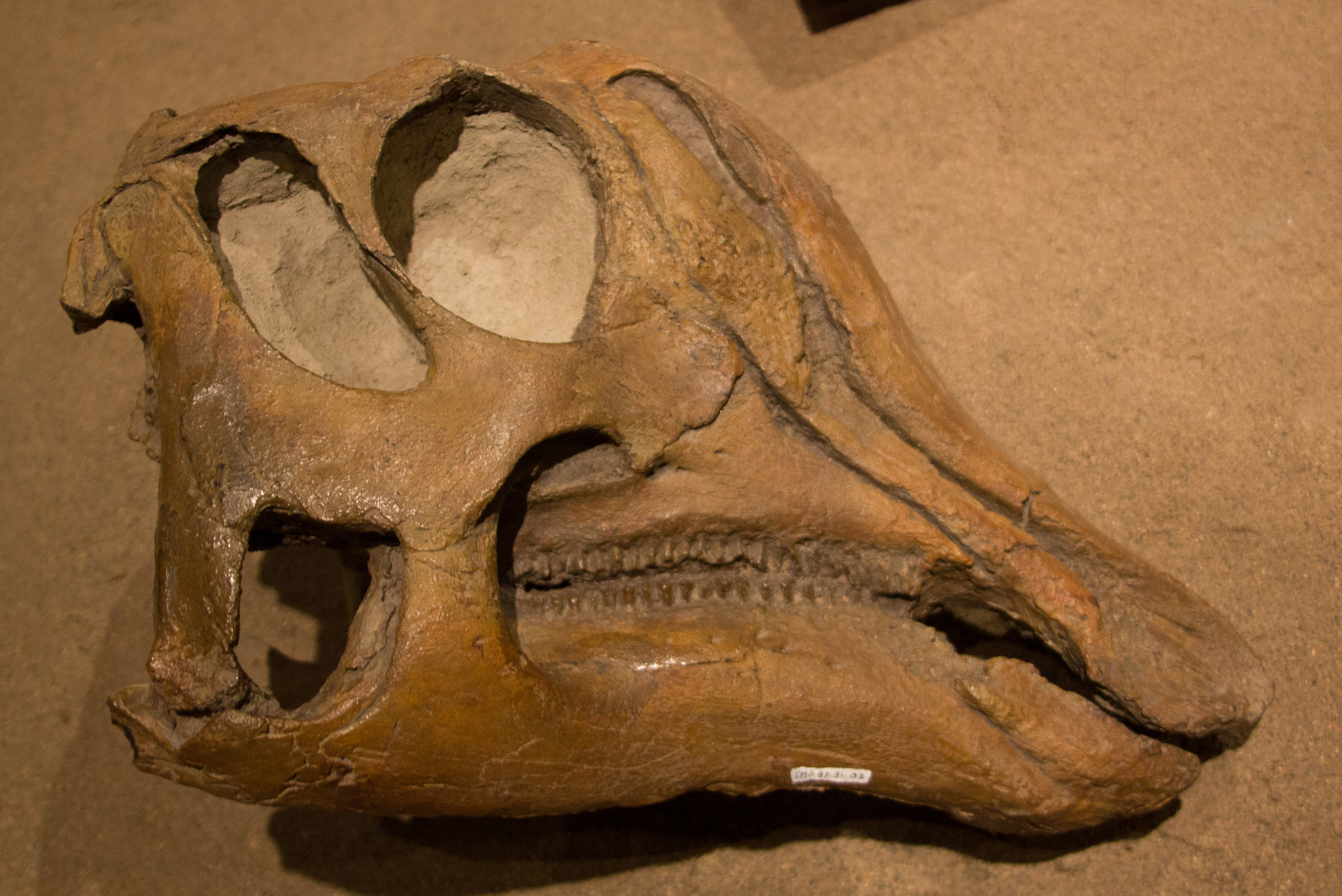
Skulls of Lambeosaurus specimens (clockwise) AMNH 5353, AMNH 5373, TMP 1983.31.2, and FMNH UC 1479

The content of Lambeosaurinae expanded over the next decades before the second review by Horner in 2004. During this period, the Asian genera Amurosaurus, Charonosaurus, and Olorotitan were named and added to Lambeosaurinae, and the status of Tsintaosaurus as a lambeosaurine was solidified. Phylogenetics began to be used to understand the relationships of genera within Lambeosaurinae, with two distinct groups being identified. Aralosaurus was previously thought to be a hadrosaurine, and only later was identified as the earliest lambeosaurine. Tsintaosaurus, Jaxartosaurus and Amurosaurus showed a gradual acquisition of features basal to a clade that included two groups. The first of these groups was related to Parasaurolophus, and the other was related to Corythosaurus. The Parasaurolophus-group, containing Parasaurolophus and Charonosaurus, was thus named Parasaurolophini by Evans and Reisz in 2007, while the Corythosaurus-group, including Lambeosaurus, Corythosaurus, Hypacrosaurus, Nipponosaurus and Olorotitan, was named Corythosaurini by Evans and Reisz. The latter group, which included Lambeosaurus, was defined as all taxa closer to Corythosaurus than to Parasaurolophus. However, in 2011, American palaeontologist Robert M. Sullivan and colleagues recognized that as Lambeosaurus, the type genus of Lambeosaurinae, was included within Corythosaurini, the group should be more properly called Lambeosaurini. The group Corythosauria was then named by Polish palaeontologist Daniel Madzia and colleagues in 2021 to unite the groups Parasaurolophini and Lambeosaurini. Lambeosaurines are united by the presence of only one process at the front of the maxilla, a dorsal process of the maxilla that is taller than wide, and an ovoid supratemporal fenestra.

Many phylogenetic analysis on Lambeosaurinae have been conducted since Evans and Reisz, beginning with the revision work of Prieto-Márquez in 2010. Lambeosaurus is sometimes found to be the closest relative of Corythosaurus while being more distantly related to Hypacrosaurus and other genera. Other results since have found Lambeosaurus as the most basal genus of lambeosaurin, closest to Corythosaurus and deeply nested within Lambeosaurini, or intermediate within Lambeosaurini. The revision of the anatomy of Amurosaurus in 2022 by Xing Hai and colleagues recognized that the reevaluated anatomy of Amurosaurus had many similarities with Lambeosaurus that had not been previously recognized in the facial skull, crest, teeth, and pelvis, which should help stabilize similar results in the future. Their results are visible below.

- Lambeosaurinae
  - - Aralosaurini
      - Canardia
      - Aralosaurus
  - - - Tsintaosaurini
        - Pararhabdodon
        - Tsintaosaurus
    - - Jaxartosaurus
      - - Arenysaurini
          - Blasisaurus
          - Arenysaurus
        - Corythosauria
          - Parasaurolophini
            - Parasaurolophus cyrtocristatus
            - - "Charonosaurus" jiayinensis
              - - Parasaurolophus tubicen
                - Parasaurolophus walkeri
          - Lambeosaurini
            - Olorotitan
            - - Velafrons
              - - - Amurosaurus
                  - Lambeosaurus
                    - Lambeosaurus clavinitialis
                    - - Lambeosaurus magnicristatus
                      - Lambeosaurus lambei
                - - Corythosaurus
                    - Corythosaurus intermedius
                    - Corythosaurus casuarius
                  - Hypacrosaurus
                    - Hypacrosaurus altispinus
                    - - "Magnapaulia" laticaudus
                      - Hypacrosaurus stebingeri

== Palaeobiology ==
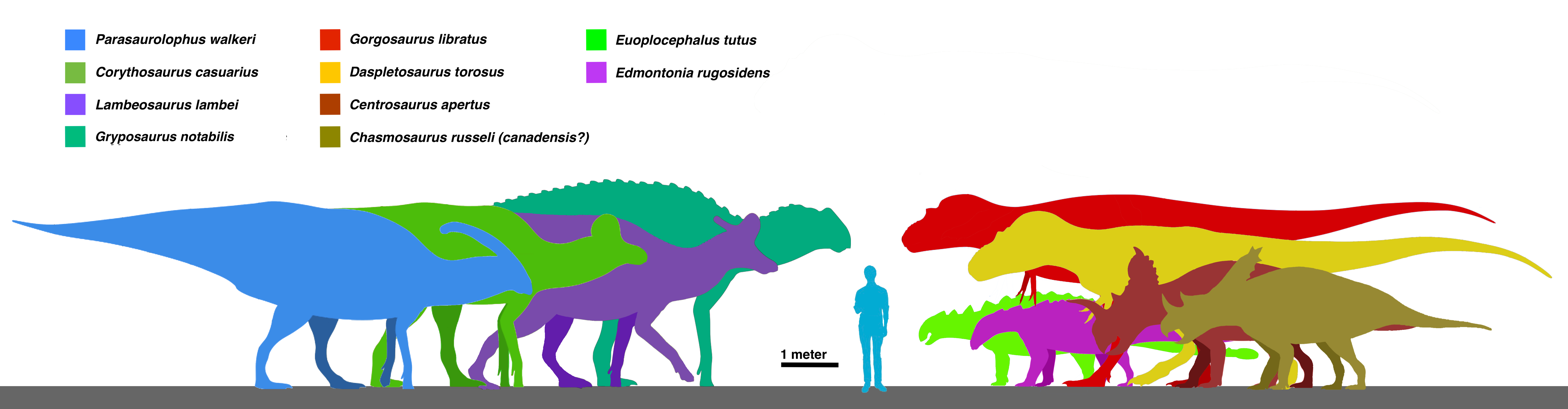
Size comparisons of megafauna from Dinosaur Park Formation, Lambeosaurus in purple on left

Hadrosaurids were the most specialized and diverse group of ornithopods and are often treated together in discussions about their palaeobiology, even though they appear to have been quite variable in the way they lived, ate, and moved. Early studies suggested that hadrosaurs were amphibious, but they are now understood to have been facultative bipeds that walked quadrupedally when moving slowly or standing still, but adopted a bipedal stance to run.

=== Feeding ===
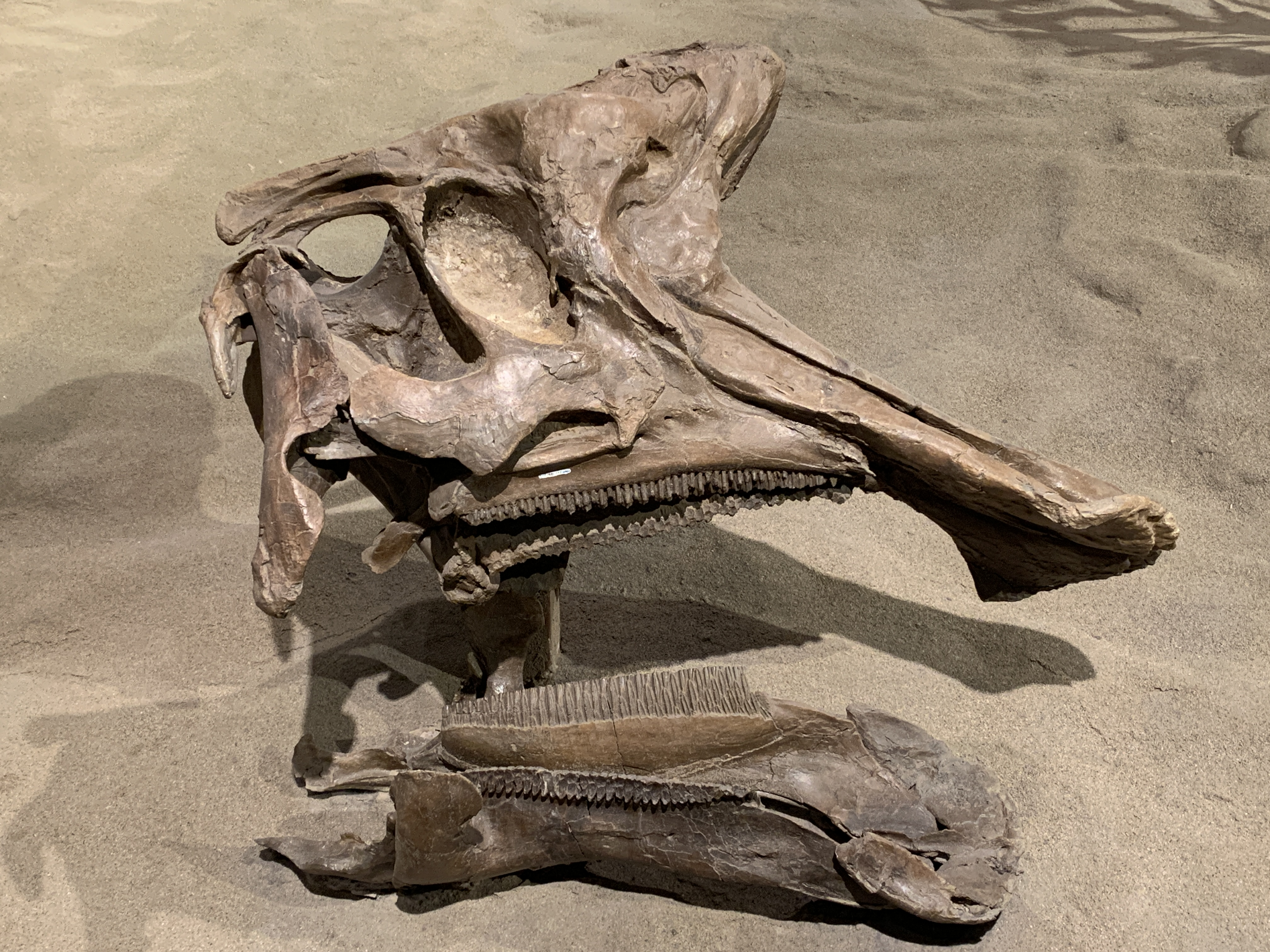
Skull of L. clavinitialis TMP 1981.37.1

Characterized as large herbivores, hadrosaurs have historically been compared with modern ungulates in diet and feeding habits, but this comparison does not take into account the profound differences between modern and Cretaceous forests. Lambeosaurus and other hadrosaurs had a unique feeding apparatus of extensive dental batteries, only found elsewhere in ceratopsids, that has been the focus of much research. While some early studies suggested this tooth arrangement was an adaptation for front-to-back (propalinal) chewing, others suggested a more complex chewing motion involving flexing of bone-to-bone joints in the jaws (pleurokinesis). The microscopic wear on teeth from chewing shows that it was not purely due to propalinity or kinesis, and instead a combination of both mechanisms contributed to the two-direction chewing motion of hadrosaurs: an oblique up-down power stroke, supplemented by front-back grinding. Among hadrosaurids, the age-related variation of the beak and limbs suggests a dietary shift during growth in hadrosaurines, while lambeosaurines retained a consistent diet. The jaws and snout of lambeosaurines are broader and more downturned, and the upper limbs are longer but maintain consistent proportions through growth. As a result, Lambeosaurus is believed to have been a less selective feeder than hadrosaurines, and instead may have prioritized efficient movement to consume greater amounts of food of lower nutritional value. The broad and slightly separate feeding envelopes of both hadrosaur subfamilies therefore may have prevented direct competition for food. This niche separation between lambeosaurines and hadrosaurines can be seen directly in Lambeosaurus and Prosaurolophus, which coexisted but show differences in dental microwear resulting from their different diets.

Reported hadrosaur gut contents and possible hadrosaur coprolites contain abundant material from conifers including decayed wood, as well as seeds, fruits, and leaf material of angiosperms, which agree with interpretations of generalist browsing. Hadrosaur teeth show more pit marks than ceratopsids, which are known to have had high-fibre diets and also have dental batteries, providing evidence for the consumption of fruits and seeds in Lambeosaurus. A generalist diet of fruits and seeds, as well as leaves and stems, is more similar to ankylosaurids and suggests the dental batteries of hadrosaurids and ceratopsids functioned differently. Teeth of Lambeosaurus have fewer and smaller microwear scratches than those of Prosaurolophus, which suggests the former had a diet of coarser plants, or fed higher up in the canopy away from the ground. Less scratches may suggest that Lambeosaurus browsed in more closed (forested) habitats than hadrosaurines that fed in open plains, and the additional lack of lambeosaurine bonebeds supports the idea that Lambeosaurus was a closed-habitat browser of herbaceous vegetation that lived solitarily and perhaps with territorial tendencies.

=== Crest function ===
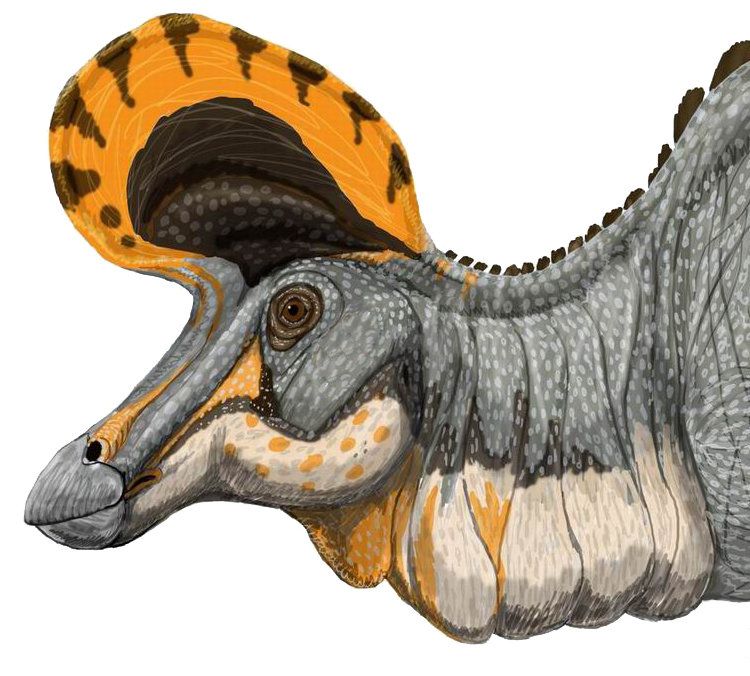
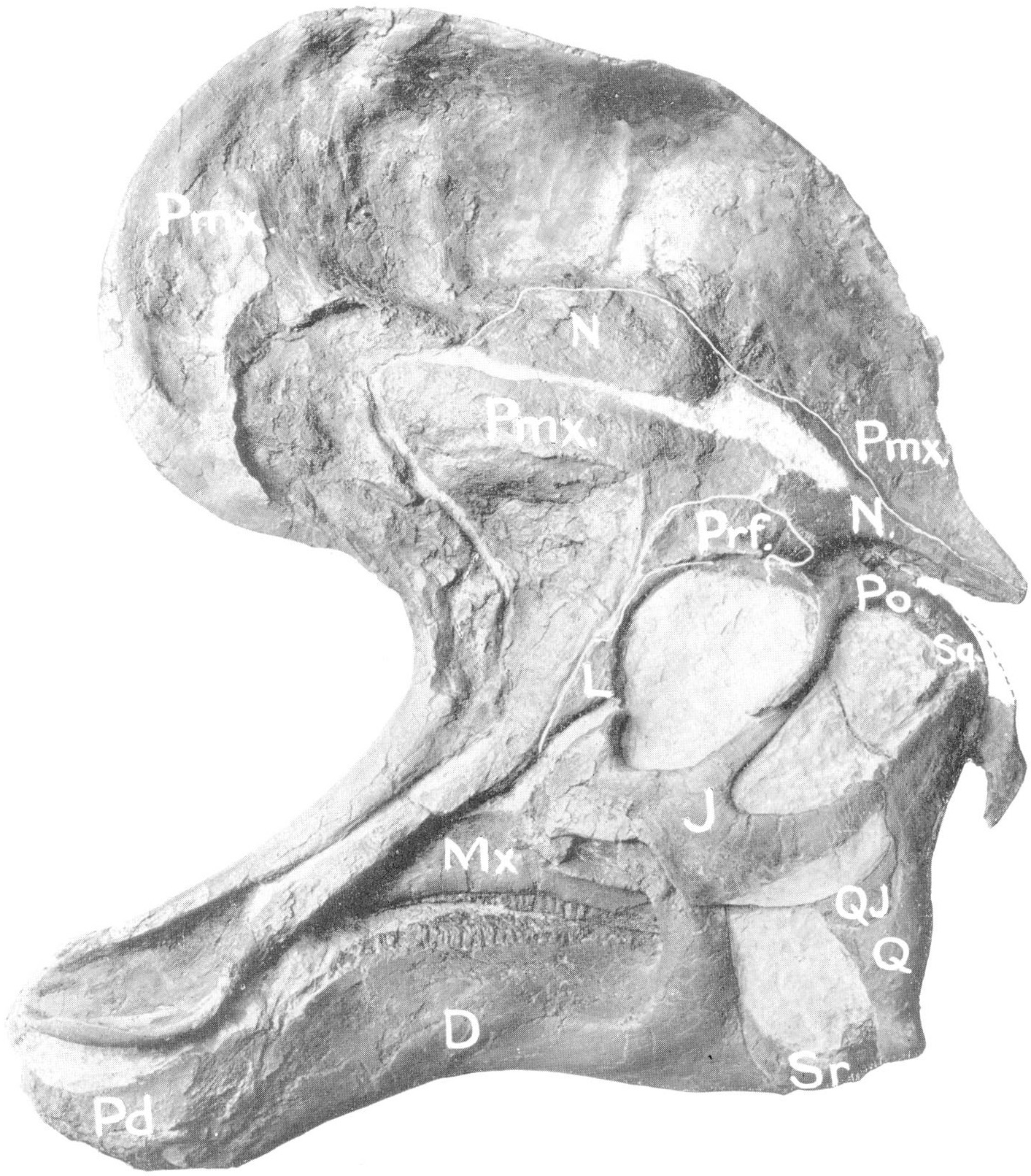
Life restoration and skull of L. magnicristatus (CMN 8705)

The function of the elaborate crest of Lambeosaurus, as well as those of other hadrosaurs, has been a topic of scientific debate for decades. The anatomy of the crests is a primary distinguishing feature between several species. Brown believed that the crest of Corythosaurus was a display structure comparable to that of the cassowary. However, the internal anatomy of the crests of lambeosaurines differ considerably from that of cassowaries. Lambeosaurine crests have an extensive system of internal sinuses, which the crests of cassowaries lack completely.

Alternative suggestions have included ideas that the crest served to assist with underwater feeding, an improved sense of smell (olfaction), thermoregulation, sodium regulation, communication, or sexual identification. In 1962, Ostrom proposed that the olfactory bulb of the brain, responsible for smell, was redirected upwards into the crest in lambeosaurines to increase the acuity of their sense of smell. Dodson instead suggested in 1975 that the extent of the crest could be used to separate Lambeosaurus into male and female individuals as a form of sexual dimorphism. Hopson, later the same year, proposed that the crests instead served as a display organ for both visual and acoustic communication, with the hollow lambeosaur crests acting as resonating device for vocalization. He believed that the crests, which varied between species and were sexually dimorphic, worked as elongated pipe organs that varied in the exact sounds they could produce. Hopson also found that the anatomy of the ear in Corythosaurus was well-developed, which suggests their sense of hearing was well-developed.

Weishampel proposed in 1981 that it could be possible to assess the functionality of the crest as a resonating chamber by creating three-dimensional models of the crests and assessing their resonance and harmonics. He used Parasaurolophus as a representative taxon for Lambeosaurinae as its internal nasal passages are simpler and easier to investigate than those of Lambeosaurus and Corythosaurus. From the internal crest length of Parasaurolophus, Weishampel supported the idea of the crests' use as sound-amplifying structures. Under this hypothesis, juveniles with smaller crests would have produced higher-frequency vocalizations, while adults would make lower sounds that would be able to travel across greater distances to assist in socialization. Lambeosaurus, with its different crest anatomy, would presumably produce a distinct vocalization frequency from Parasaurolophus, but still be able to use its crest in much the same way.

In 2006, David Evans conducted the first detailed study of the available braincase material of lambeosaurines. He found that there was no evidence the olfactory nerves entered the nasal loops, and therefore the passages were non-olfactory and the nerves did not branch up into the crest. Evans was thus able to reject Ostrom's idea that the crest aided in a sense of smell, and instead suggested acoustic resonance as the primary driver for its evolution, with visual display as an important secondary function. Studies of the brain anatomy of lambeosaurines by Evans and colleagues in 2009 also suggested that the crest served as a signaling structure in social behavior.

=== Growth ===
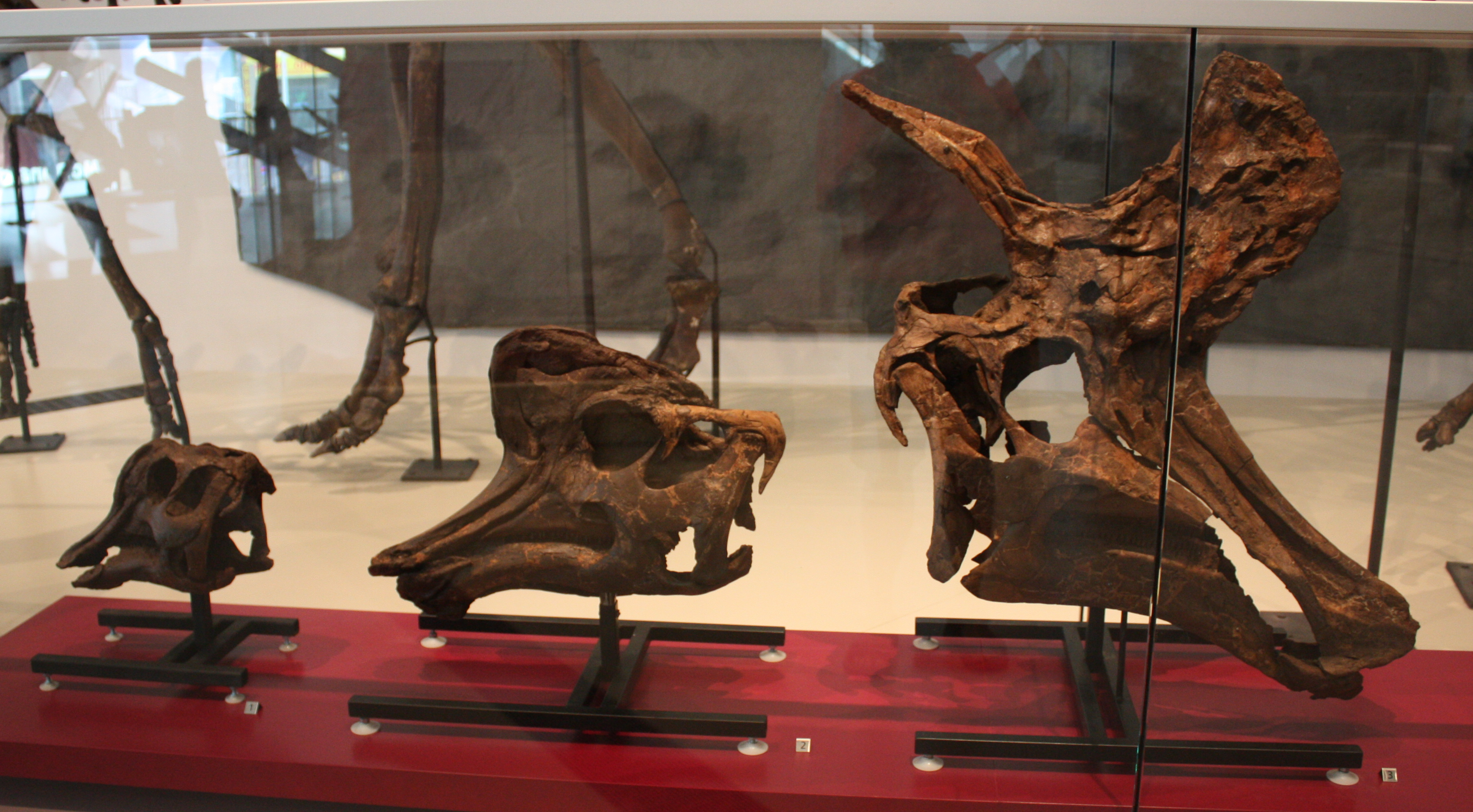
Growth series of L. lambei skulls (l-r): ROM 758, ROM 869, ROM 794

Studies on the effects of growth in Lambeosaurus began when Peter Dodson identified Procheneosaurus as juvenile specimens of Lambeosaurus. The ontogeny of the lambeosaurines Hypacrosaurus and Parasaurolophus has been examined, but no direct studies of the absolute ages of Lambeosaurus specimens have ever been performed. All inferences about the ages of Lambeosaurus specimens are based on the relative size of the specimens. Based on the study of other hadrosaurs, it has been identified that the development of the crest began late in growth in all lambeosaurines except Parasaurolophus. Throughout their maturation, the skulls of Lambeosaurus and other lambeosaurines increased in length by an order of magnitude or greater, up to the largest individuals of Lambeosaurus being 93% the size of Hypacrosaurus. The crest itself grew faster than the rest of the body, with the greatest increase in size occurring in L. magnicristatus and Corythosaurus, while L. lambei, L. clavinitialis, and Hypacrosaurus all reached similar crest sizes. The growth pattern of the spur on the crest of Lambeosaurus is difficult to establish due to its breakage during fossilisation of some specimens and the difficulty in assigning juveniles to L. lambei or L. clavinitialis. The fontanelle between the nasal and premaxilla described by Maryañska and Osmólska does not show a clear decrease in size during growth despite initial suggestions, so its function with relation to crest development remains uncertain. Patterns of crest growth are most similar between Corythosaurus and Hypacrosaurus, likely reflecting their closer phylogenetic relationship than to Lambeosaurus.

Excluding the crest, the skull of Lambeosaurus grew more slowly than the rest of the skeleton. The skull changed in proportions during growth, with the snout becoming slightly longer while the maxilla and height of the skull excluding the crest, as well as the general size of the brain, decreased proportionally. The facial skeleton of Corythosaurus and Lambeosaurus maintained their similarities during growth, while the parietal of Hypacrosaurus decreased in size proportionally allowing it to be distinguished. General changes during growth also occurred throughout the rest of the skull and body of hadrosaurids, including an increase in the total number of teeth, a decrease in the proportional size of the orbit, and the development of textured regions for increased muscle attachment.

== Palaeoecology ==
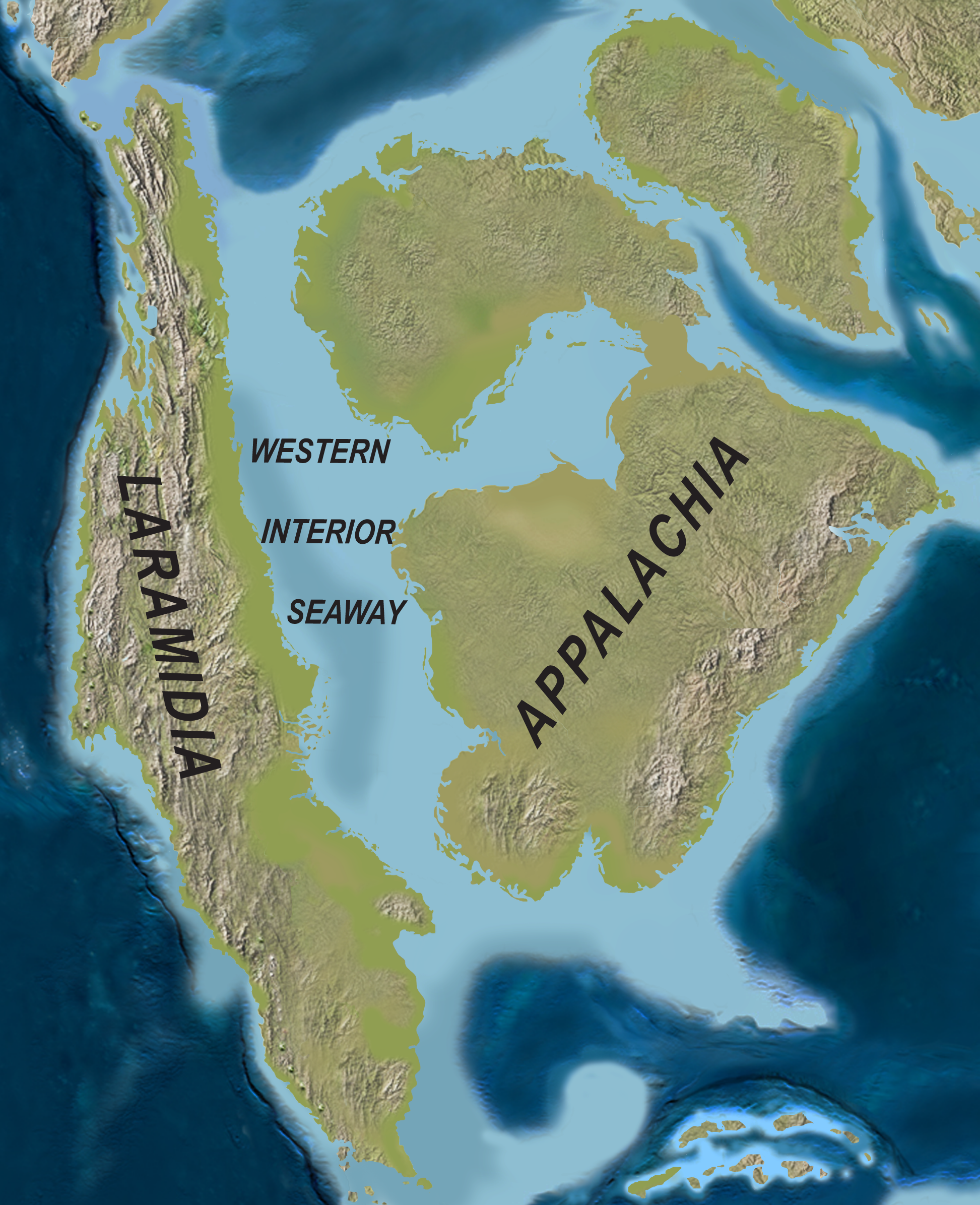
Map of North America and the Western Interior Seaway 75 mya

The Belly River series, as it was known when the first fossils of Lambeosaurus were found, is now known as the Belly River Group, spanning the Campanian Foremost, Oldman, and Dinosaur Park formations. Along the Red Deer River, only the Oldman and Dinosaur Park formations are exposed, reaching a thickness of around 90 m (300 ft). Lambeosaurus is only known from the Dinosaur Park Formation, which has been constrained in age between 76.47 and 74.44 million years ago, and divided into three faunal zones. The oldest faunal zone is identified by the coexistence of Corythosaurus and the ceratopsid Centrosaurus apertus, and transitioned at 75.77 million years ago into a fauna characterized by Prosaurolophus maximus and the ceratopsid Styracosaurus albertensis. The youngest faunal zone coincides with the presence of bituminous coal at 75.098 mya, and the replacement of the common megaherbivores from older beds with the much rarer L. magnicristatus, and ceratopsids including Chasmosaurus irvinensis and a ceratopsid similar to Achelousaurus. L. clavinitialis is the oldest species of Lambeosaurus, found only within the middle Campanian coexisting with Corythosaurus and Centrosaurus. L. lambei is younger, coexisting with both Corythosaurus and Centrosaurus, as well as Styracosaurus and Prosaurolophus from the middle to late Campanian with some possible overlap with both L. clavinitialis and L. magnicristatus.

=== Palaeoenvironment ===
With the exception of the mud-dominated coal zone, the sediments of the Dinosaur Park Formation are indicative of an alluvial environment with channels and overbanks of river channels of both low and high sinuosity. Some channel widths may even have exceeded 200 m (660 ft), flowing east towards the Bearpaw Sea across the coastal plain. While some studies suggest that the Dinosaur Provincial Park region of the Dinosaur Park Formation was under both river and oceanic influence, there are no signs of tidal influence, placing the deposits further inland above the potential for any backwater from tidal change. The Dinosaur Park Formation was deposited on a low slope during the start of the last major marine transgression of the shallow Western Interior Seaway that spanned central North America, where it expanded westward to cover the region in the marine deposits of the Bearpaw Formation. The environment of the coal zone directly before the submersion is less studied, but it shows mixed freshwater-brackish-marine assemblages and coastal erosion.

The cordillera to the west of Alberta was tectonically active, with volcanic eruptions spreading ash into the formation, and warmer climates than modern with little to no frost. There may have been seasonality of wetter and drier parts of the year, allowing for a diversity in plants and animals. The rivers of the coastal plain were lined with narrow zones of dense vegetation, and as the seaway approached, some areas would see periodic flooding or even standing swamps or mires that accumulated into the coal deposits. The ground would have been wet everywhere, with conifers dominating the canopy while ferns, tree ferns, and flowering herbs and shrubs formed the understory. The ground would have been covered with mosses, lichens, and fungi, and a layer of decaying plant matter. Standing water would be vegetated by water plants and algae. Insects were plentiful, with the streams and surrounding environment inhabited by clams, snails, fish, turtles, and crocodiles, as well as pterosaurs, dinosaurs, and small mammals.

=== Contemporary fauna ===
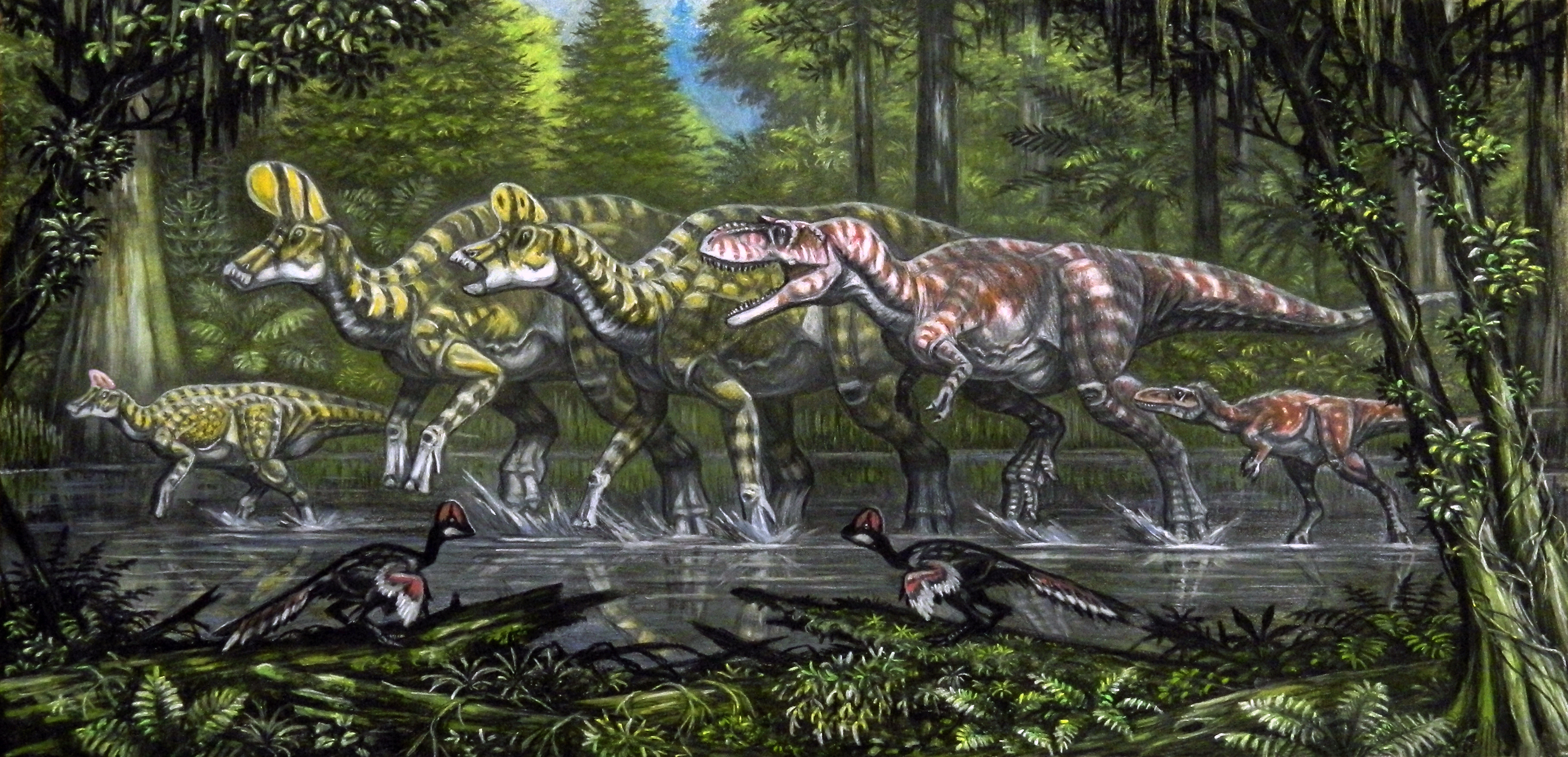
Life restoration of L. magnicristatus being chased by Gorgosaurus

A rich and diverse vertebrate assemblage is known from the Dinosaur Park Formation, with the lower region, excluding the Lethbridge Coal Zone, being formed by terrestrial and coastal deposits. The constant presence of water in the formation led many forms of freshwater or marine animals to enter the otherwise predominantly terrestrial ecosystem. In the lower Dinosaur Park Formation, assemblages of crevasse sites show that the freshwater clam Sphaerium was the most common mollusk, and it occurred with abundant gastropods of the genera Goniobasis and Lioplacodes. A variety of forms of fish are present in the fluvial beds of the formation, including chondrichthyans, teleosts and other ray-finned fishes. The ray Myledaphus is characteristic of the formation and lived alongside the less common shark Hybodus montanensis, and paddlefish, sturgeons, bowfins, the aspidorhynchid Belonostomus, the gar Lepisosteus, and small teleosts including Paratarpon and Cretophareodus. At least nine forms of amphibians were present in the formation, including the salamander-like Albanerpeton, frogs, and salamanders from the genera Scapherpeton, Lisserpeton, Opisthotriton, Habrosaurus. Turtles are common and represented by the baenids Plesiobaena, Boremys and Neurankylus, the macrobaenid Judithemys, an unnamed but new form of snapping turtle, the primitive trionychoids Adocus and Basilemys, and the softshelled turtles Apalone and Aspideretoides. Six small lizards are known but no snakes, with the teiids Socognathus and Glyptogenys, the xenosaurid Exostinus, the helodermatid Labrodioctes, the necrosaurid Parasaniwa, and the varanid Palaeosaniwa. Choristoderes, an extinct group of semi-aquatic animals with crocodilian features, are represented by Cteniogenys and many well-preserved skulls and skeletons of its relative Champsosaurus. The major types of Cretaceous mammals have been found in the formation: the multituberculates Cimexomys, Cimolodon, Cimolomys, Meniscoessus, and Mesodma, the marsupials Alphadon, Eodelphis, Pediomys, and Turgidodon, and the placentals Cimolestes, Gypsonictops, and Paranyctoides.

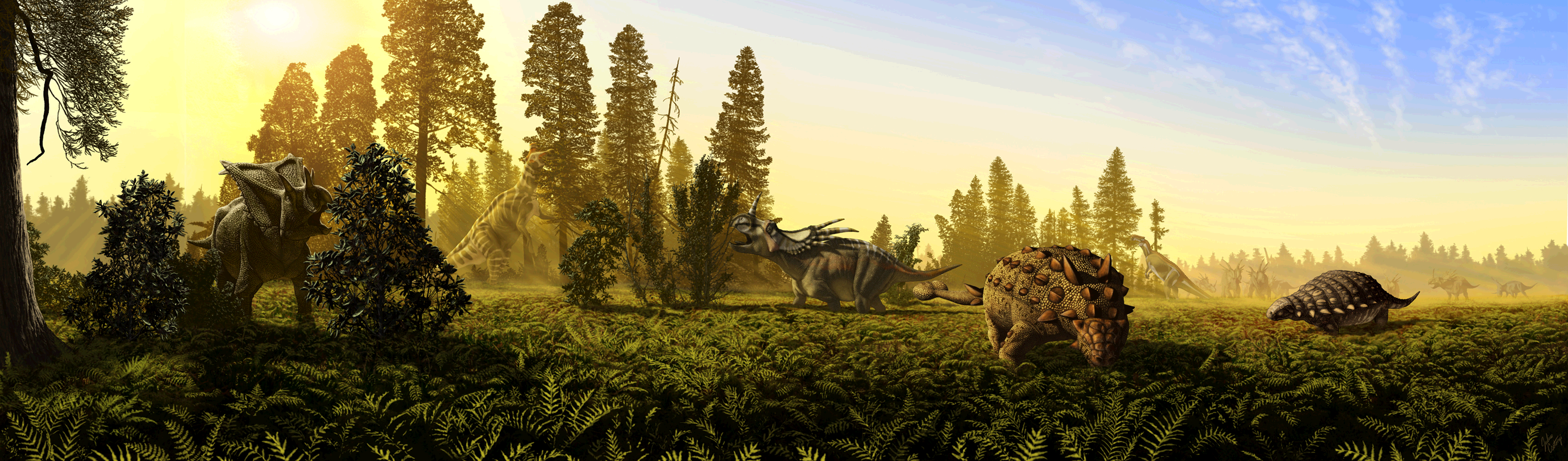
Megafaunal herbivores of the Dinosaur Park Formation, L. lambei second from left amongst trees

Microfossil sites are common, but a taphonomic bias is present in the formation towards the better preservation of large-bodied animals like Lambeosaurus. Mosasaurs and plesiosaurs are both known from the formation, though apart from the relatively complete elasmosaurid Fluvionectes, both are poorly known. Two or three true crocodilians are known, including the genera Leidyosuchus and Albertochampsa, and two pterosaurs have been found, the azhdarchid Cryodrakon and an unnamed pterodactyloid. While no other dinosaurs were recovered at the same sites as any Lambeosaurus specimens, correlation and comparisons of localities throughout the formation show it coexisted with a large variety of animals. The herbivorous fauna of the formation can be divided into two Megafaunal Assemblage Zones, defined as the lowest 28 m (92 ft) directly above the Oldman Formation, and the deposits above those, where the common ceratopsid Centrosaurus and hadrosaurid Parasaurolophus are absent. Lambeosaurus, which has been found from around 17 to 52 m (56 to 171 ft) above the contact, is from the upper portion of the older MAZ-1 to the upper portion of the younger MAZ-2, and would have coexisted with the ankylosaurid Euoplocephalus, nodosaurid Panoplosaurus, ceratopsids Centrosaurus, Styracosaurus and Chasmosaurus belli, and hadrosaurids Corythosaurus intermedius, Parasaurolophus, and Prosaurolophus. As well as herbivorous megafauna, unnamed ornithopods, the primitive ceratopsian Unescoceratops and the pachycephalosaurians Stegoceras validum, Stegoceras sternbergi and Stegoceras brevis are known from the formation, though their stratigraphic correlations are uncertain. Among theropods, the dromaeosaurids Dromaeosaurus and Saurornitholestes are known, the former from a single specimen of uncertain provenance, and the latter from many specimens such as teeth throughout the entire formation, and troodontids from the MAZ-1 are limited to Stenonychosaurus while Latenivenatrix is known from MAZ-2. Three genera of oviraptorosaurs are known, all of which likely coexisted in the formation: Caenagnathus, Chirostenotes and Citipes. It is possible that a therizinosaur was present based on a single frontal bone, and three ornithomimosaurs are preserved in the MAZ-1, Rativates, Ornithomimus, and Struthiomimus. The only large theropods to coexist with Lambeosaurus were the tyrannosaurids Gorgosaurus and an unnamed species of Daspletosaurus.
