= Dinosaur Park Formation =

Uppermost member of the Belly River Group geologic unit in Alberta, Canada

- Stratigraphic range: Late Cretaceous, Campanian, 76.5–74.4 Ma
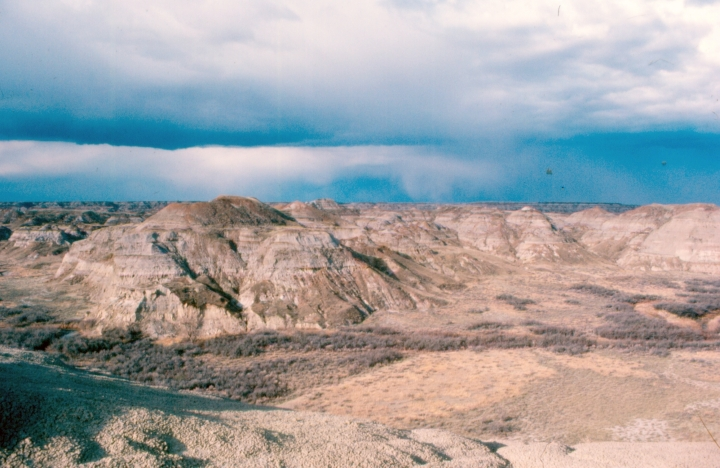
- Dinosaur Park Formation exposed along the Red Deer River in Dinosaur Provincial Park, southeastern Alberta, Canada.
- Type: Geological formation
- Unit of: Belly River Group
- Underlies: Bearpaw Formation
- Overlies: Oldman Formation

Lithology
- Primary: Sandstone (lower); Mudstone and siltstone (upper)
- Other: Bentonite and coal

Location
- Coordinates: 49.2°N 110.4°W
- Approximate paleocoordinates: 56.4°N 75.8°W
- Region: Alberta
- Country: Canada
- Extent: Western Canadian Sedimentary Basin

Type section
- Named for: Dinosaur Provincial Park
- Named by: Eberth, D.A. and Hamblin, A.P.
- Year defined: 1993
- Dinosaur Park Formation (Canada) Dinosaur Park Formation (Alberta)

The Dinosaur Park Formation is the uppermost member of the Belly River Group (also known as the Judith River Group), a major geologic unit in southern Alberta. It was deposited during the Campanian stage of the Late Cretaceous, between about 76.5 and 74.4 million years ago. It was deposited in alluvial and coastal plain environments, and it is bounded by the nonmarine Oldman Formation below it and the marine Bearpaw Formation above it.

The Dinosaur Park Formation contains dense concentrations of dinosaur skeletons, both articulated and disarticulated, which are often found with preserved remains of soft tissues. Remains of other animals such as fish, turtles, and crocodilians, as well as plant remains, are also abundant. The formation has been named after Dinosaur Provincial Park, a UNESCO World Heritage Site where the formation is well exposed in the badlands that flank the Red Deer River.

== Research history ==
The Dinosaur Park Formation has been a significant source of terrestrial vertebrate fossils for over a century. The first recorded account of fossils was in 1871 by the priest Jean-Baptiste L'Heureux who was shown bones of the "grandfather of the buffalo" by the Blackfoot Confederacy he was living with, though these notes were never published. Official reports of dinosaur bones in western Canada were reported by George Mercer Dawson in 1874 from southern Saskatchewan and Alberta along the Milk River. Further discoveries by Dawson and his colleagues of the Geological Survey of Canada continued in the 1880s, including the 1884 discovery by Joseph Burr Tyrrell of the skull of a theropod identified as Laelaps by American palaeontologist Edward Drinker Cope but named in 1905 as Albertosaurus by American palaeontologist Henry Fairfield Osborn. In 1889 rich fossil beds in the areas of Deadlodge Canyon and Berry Creek were found by Thomas Chesmer Weston along the Red Deer River. The areas along the Red Deer River would be more completely surveyed by Canadian palaeontologist Lawrence Lambe from 1897 until 1901, when he, along with Osborn, described the fossils found in what was then considered to be the Belly River Formation of mid-Cretaceous age.

== Geological setting ==
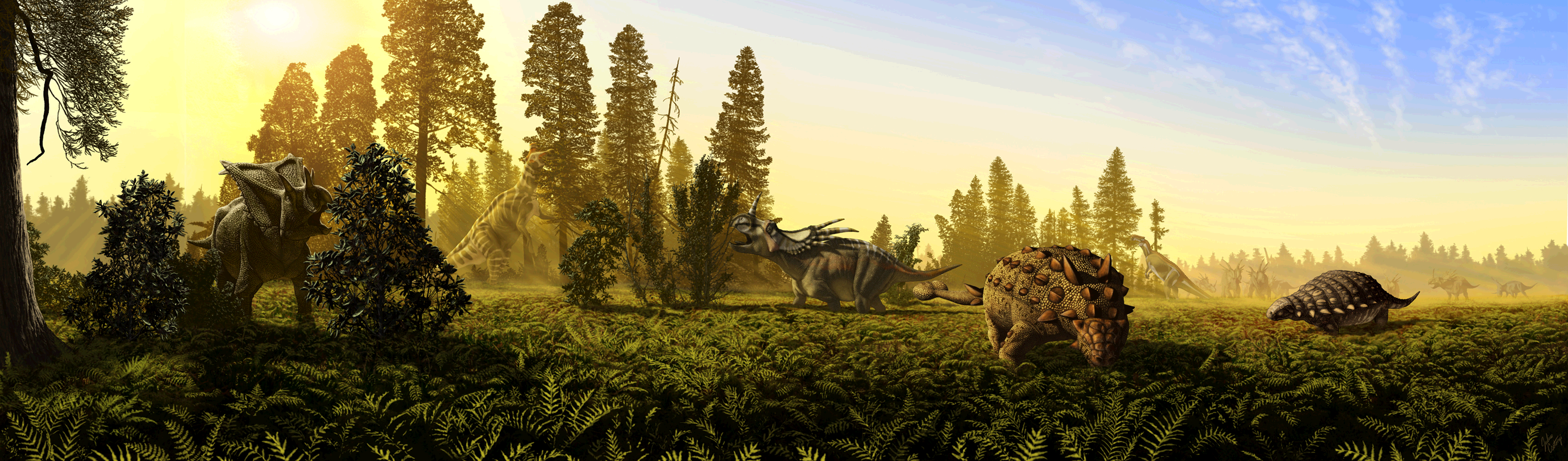
Restoration of the megafaunal dinosaurs of the Dinosaur Park Formation. From left to right: Chasmosaurus, Lambeosaurus, Styracosaurus, Scolosaurus, Prosaurolophus, Panoplosaurus, and a herd of Styracosaurus in the background

The Dinosaur Park Formation is composed of sediments that were derived from the erosion of the mountains to the west. It was deposited on an alluvial to coastal plain by river systems that flowed eastward and southeastward to the Bearpaw Sea, a large inland sea that was part of the Western Interior Seaway. That sea gradually inundated the adjacent coastal plain, depositing the marine shales of the Bearpaw Formation on top of the Dinosaur Park Formation.

The Dinosaur Park Formation is about 70 metres (230 ft) thick at Dinosaur Park. The lower portion of the formation was laid down in fluvial channel environments and consists primarily of fine- to medium-grained, crossbedded sandstones. The upper portion, which was deposited in overbank and floodplain environments, consists primarily of massive to laminated, organic-rich mudstones with abundant root traces, and thin beds of bentonite. The Lethbridge Coal Zone, which consists of several seams of low-rank coal interbedded with mudstones and siltstones, marks the top of the formation.

The sediments of the Dinosaur Park Formation are similar to those of the underlying Oldman Formation and they were originally included in that formation. The two formations are separated by a regional disconformity, however, and are distinguished by petrographic and sedimentologic differences. In addition, articulated skeletal remains and bonebeds are rare in the Oldman Formation but abundant in the Dinosaur Park Formation.

== Biostratigraphy ==
The Dinosaur Park Formation can be divided into at least two distinct faunas. The lower part of the formation is characterized by the abundance of Corythosaurus and Centrosaurus. This group of species is replaced higher in the formation by a different ornithischian fauna characterized by the presence of Lambeosaurus and Styracosaurus. The appearance of several new, rare species of ornithischian at the very top of the formation may indicate that a third distinct fauna had replaced the second during the transition into younger, non-Dinosaur Park sediments, at the same time an inland sea transgresses onto land, but there are fewer remains here. An unnamed pachyrhinosaur, Vagaceratops irvinensis, and Lambeosaurus magnicristatus may be more common in this third fauna.

Biostratigraphy of the megaherbivores of the Dinosaur Park Formation with ranges, assemblage zones, and radiometric dating after Mallon (2019) and Eberth and colleagues (2023):

*The taxonomy of Euoplocephalus tutus is disputed, with Penalski (2018) separating the taxon into: Scolosaurus cutleri (~0m), Platypelta coombsi (~3-8m), Euoplocephalus tutus (~16-30m), Anodontosaurus inceptus (~27-31m), and Scolosaurus thronus (~40m)

== Paleofauna ==
=== Dinosaurs ===
Color key: Taxon / Reclassified taxon / Taxon falsely reported as present / Dubious taxon or junior synonym / Ichnotaxon / Ootaxon / Morphotaxon

Notes
Uncertain or tentative taxa are in small text
~~crossed out~~ taxa are discredited.

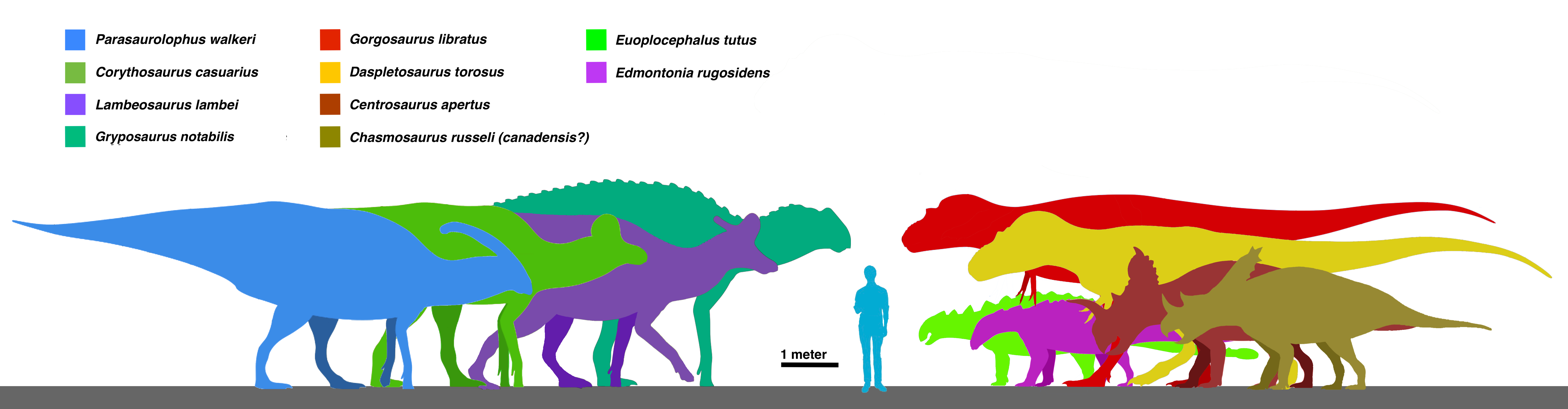
Size of the dinosaur megafauna of the lower Dinosaur Park Formation (the so-called "Centrosaurus-Corythosaurus zone")

Remains of the following dinosaurs have been found in the formation:

==== Ornithischians ====
Remains of the following ornithischians have been found in the formation:

===== Ankylosaurs =====
Numerous specimens that cannot be definitively assigned to ankylosaurs are known from the formation, including fragmentary cranial, dental, postcranial, and armour material. As all ankylosaurids from the Campanian of Alberta and Montana were historically referred to Euoplocephalus sensu lato, the taxonomy is variable between studies and ranges from one to seven valid genera between the Dinosaur Park, Judith River, Two Medicine, and Horseshoe Canyon Formations.

Ankylosaurs from the Dinosaur Park Formation
Genus	Species	Location	Stratigraphic position	Material	Notes	Images
Anodontosaurus	A. inceptus	Hilda, Alberta	Middle DPF	Two skulls, one with partial skeleton	Previously considered specimens of Euoplocephalus but then referred to Anodontosaurus lambei, otherwise only known from the Horseshoe Canyon Formation, before being given the new species A. inceptus.	
Dyoplosaurus	D. acutosquameus	Q002	Lower DPF	Partial skull and skeleton, two tail clubs	Thought to be a synonym of Euoplocephalus for a time but separated as a distinct taxon.	
Edmontonia	E. rugosidens	Q009, Q043, Q101, Q201, Q229, Q230	Lower DPF	At least six partial skulls and skeletons	A nodosaurid also known from the Two Medicine Formation	
Euoplocephalus	E. tutus	Q059, Q198	Lower to middle DPF	Partial skulls and skeletons	An ankylosaurid historically including all material from the formation. While some studies include up to 11 specimens even with Anodontosaurus, Dyoplosaurus and Scolosaurus separated, others limit it to 5 specimens and also separate Platypelta.	
Panoplosaurus	P. mirus	Q008, Q228	Middle DPF	Skulls and skeleton	A nodosaurid 1/3 less common than Edmontonia.	
Platypelta	P. coombsi	Q052	Lowermost DPF	Skulls and skeletons	Considered specimens of Euoplocephalus by some studies, but separated as a distinct genus by others.	
Scolosaurus	S. cutleri	Q080, Q089	Base of DPF	Skull(s?) and skeletons	Thought to be a synonym of Euoplocephalus for a time but separated as a distinct taxon. Has been suggested to include Oohkotokia from the Two Medicine Formation, and also to be from the top of the Oldman Formation if the quarry is incorrectly mapped.	
Scolosaurus	S. thronus	Quarry No. 112	Upper DPF	Skull and partial skeletons	Considered indeterminate ankylosaurids or specimens of Euoplocephalus by some studies, but separated as a distinct species by others.	

===== Ceratopsians =====
An unnamed Pachyrhinosaurus-like taxon has been recovered from the formation.

Ceratopsians from the Dinosaur Park Formation
Genus	Species	Location	Stratigraphic position	Material	Notes	Images
Centrosaurus	C. apertus		Middle, 76.2-75.5Ma ago	"[Fifteen] skulls, several skeletons, all adult; abundant bone-bed material with rare juveniles and subadults." C. nasicornis may be a synonym.	A centrosaurine ceratopsid	
Chasmosaurus	C. belli		Middle, 76–75.5Ma ago	"[Twelve] skulls, several skeletons."	A chasmosaurine ceratopsid	
Chasmosaurus	C. sp.		Lower, ~76.5Ma		An unnamed chasmosaurine ceratopsid formally attributed to Chasmosaurus russeli	
Cryptarcus	C. russelli		Upper, 75-75.6Ma	A nearly complete skull.	A chasmosaurine ceratopsid. Formerly assigned to Chasmosaurus.	
Mercuriceratops	M. gemini		Lower, ~77Ma ago	"one apomorphic squamosal"	A chasmosaurine ceratopsid	
Monoclonius	M. lowei				A dubious centrosaurine ceratopsid. Synonymous with Centrosaurus.	
Pentaceratops	P. aquilonius		Uppermost, 74.8 MA	two frill fragments	A dubious chasmosaurine ceratopsid that may be the same species as Spiclypeus shipporum.	
Spinops	S. sternbergorum		Lower, 76.5Ma	"partial parietal bone, partial dentary, unidentifiable limb fragments, partial skull, and partial right squamosal."	A centrosaurine ceratopsid. The holotype's locality is uncertain and may be from the upper Oldman Formation. A parietal from Muddy Lake, Saskatchewan suggests they were present in the lower Dinosaur Park.	
Styracosaurus	S. albertensis		Upper, 75.5-75.2Ma ago	"[Two] skulls, [three] skeletons, additional material in bone beds."	A centrosaurine ceratopsid	
Unescoceratops	U. koppelhusae			Partial lower jaw	A leptoceratopsid thought to have been between one and two meters long and less than 91 kilograms. Its teeth were the roundest of all leptoceratopsids.	
Vagaceratops	V. irvinensis		Upper, 75Ma ago	"[Three] skulls, skeleton lacking tail."	A chasmosaurine ceratopsid species previously classified as a species of Chasmosaurus.	

===== Ornithopods =====
At least one indeterminate thescelosaurid specimen has been recovered from the formation.

In a 2001 review of hadrosaur eggshell and hatchling material from the Dinosaur Park Formation, Darren H. Tanke and M. K. Brett-Surman concluded that hadrosaurs nested in both the ancient upland and lowlands of the formation's depositional environment. The upland nesting grounds may have been preferred by the less common hadrosaurs, like Brachylophosaurus or Parasaurolophus. However, the authors were unable to determine what specific factors shaped nesting ground choice in the formation's hadrosaurs. They suggested that behavior, diet, soil condition, and competition between dinosaur species all potentially influenced where hadrosaurs nested.

Sub-centimeter fragments of pebbly-textured hadrosaur eggshell have been reported from the Dinosaur Park Formation. This eggshell is similar to the hadrosaur eggshell of Devil's Coulee in southern Alberta as well as that of the Two Medicine and Judith River Formations in Montana, United States. While present, dinosaur eggshell is very rare in the Dinosaur Park Formation and is only found in two different microfossil sites. These sites are distinguished by large numbers of pisidiid clams and other less common shelled invertebrates like unionid clams and snails. This association is not a coincidence as the invertebrate shells would have slowly dissolved and released enough basic calcium carbonate to protect the eggshells from naturally occurring acids that otherwise would have dissolved them and prevented fossilization.

In contrast with eggshell fossils, the remains of very young hadrosaurs are actually somewhat common. Darren Tanke has observed that an experienced collector could actually discover multiple juvenile hadrosaur specimens in a single day. The most common remains of young hadrosaurs in the Dinosaur Park Formation are dentaries, bones from limbs and feet, as well as vertebral centra. The material showed little or none of the abrasion that would have resulted from transport, meaning the fossils were buried near their point of origin. Bonebeds 23, 28, 47, and 50 are productive sources of young hadrosaur remains in the formation, especially bonebed 50. The bones of juvenile hadrosaurs and fossil eggshell fragments are not known to have preserved in association with each other, despite both being present in the formation.

Ornithopods from the Dinosaur Park Formation
Genus	Species	Location	Stratigraphic position	Material	Notes	Images
Corythosaurus	C. casuarius		Lower-Middle, 76.5-75.5Ma ago	"Approximately [ten] articulated skulls and associated postcrania, [ten to fifteen] articulated skulls, isolated skull elements, juvenile to adult."	A lambeosaurin lambeosaurine hadrosaur	
Gryposaurus	G. notabilis		Lower, 76.2-76Ma ago	"Approximately [ten] complete skulls, [twelve] fragmentary skulls, associated postcrania."	A kritosaurin saurolophine hadrosaur	
Lambeosaurus	L. lambei		Upper, 75.5-75Ma ago	"Approximately [seven] articulated skulls with associated postcrania, [possibly ten] articulated skulls, isolated skull elements, juvenile to adult."		
Lambeosaurus	L. magnicristatus		Upper/Bearpaw Formation, 74.8Ma ago	"[Two] complete skulls, one with associated, articulated postcrania."		
Parasaurolophus	P. walkeri		Lower, 76.5-75.3Ma ago	"Complete skull and postcranial skeleton."	A parasaurolophin lambeosaurine hadrosaur.	
Prosaurolophus	P. maximus		Upper, 75.5 – 74.8 Ma	"[Twenty to twenty-five] individuals, including at least [seven] articulated skulls and associated postcrania."	A saurolophin saurolophine hadrosaur.	

===== Pachycephalosaurs =====
Pachycephalosaurs from the Dinosaur Park Formation
Genus	Species	Location	Stratigraphic position	Material	Notes	Images
Foraminacephale	F. brevis		Also present in the Oldman Formation	Frontoparetal dome, various other skull fragments including juvenile and subadult material	Once thought to be a species of Stegoceras	
Sphaerotholus	S. lyonsi		Upper, 76.10 ± 0.5 Ma	Right squamosal		
Stegoceras	S. validum			Specimens including frontoparietal dome.		

==== Theropods ====
In the Dinosaur Park Formation, small theropods are rare due to the tendency of their thin-walled bones to be broken or poorly preserved. Small bones of small theropods that were preyed upon by larger ones may have been swallowed whole and digested. In this context, the discovery of a small theropod dinosaur with preserved tooth marks was especially valuable. Possible indeterminate avimimid remains are known from the formation.

===== Ornithomimids =====
Ornithomimids from the Dinosaur Park Formation
Genus	Species	Location	Stratigraphic position	Material	Notes	Images
Ornithomimus	O. samuli		Zone 2	Skull and skeleton	An ornithomimid, possibly a species of Dromiceiomimus.	
Ornithomimus	O. sp.		Zone 1			
Qiupalong	Q. sp.			Partial skeleton and isolated specimens	An ornithomimid, possibly a radiation of this genus from Asia.	
Rativates	R. evadens		Zone 1	Skull and skeleton	An ornithomimid, formerly a specimen of Struthiomimus.	
Struthiomimus	S. altus		Zone 1			
Ornithomimidae indet.	Indeterminate		Zone 1	Isolated material including unguals of the pes and the manus, caudal vertebrae, and a partial frontal	Indeterminate large Ornithomimosaur, possibly distinct from known taxa	

===== Oviraptorosaurs =====
Oviraptorosaurs from the Dinosaur Park Formation
Genus	Species	Location	Stratigraphic position	Material	Notes	Images
Caenagnathus	C. collinsi			Mandible, type specimen	A caenagnathid which rivalled Anzu in size.	
Chirostenotes	C. pergracilis			Several fragmentary specimens, type specimen	A mid-sized caenagnathid.	
Citipes	C. elegans			Several fragmentary specimens, type specimen	Smallest caenagnathid from the formation.	
Macrophalangia	M. canadensis				Junior synonym of Chirostenotes pergracilis	

===== Paravians =====
A new taxon of troodontid based solely on teeth is known from the upper part of the formation.

Paravians from the Dinosaur Park Formation
Genus	Species	Location	Stratigraphic position	Material	Notes	Images
cf. Baptornis	Indeterminate				A hesperornithine bird	
cf. Cimolopteryx	Indeterminate			Partial coracoid	A possible charadriiform bird	
Dromaeosaurus	D. albertensis			Several specimens and teeth, type specimen	A dromaeosaurid	
Hesperonychus	H. elizabethae			Hip bones and partial toes and claws, type specimen	A dromaeosaurid or an avialan, also found in the Oldman Formation	
Latenivenatrix	L. mcmasterae			Hip bones, pelvis, skull fragments, type specimen	A large troodontid measuring 3–3.5 m (9.8–11.5 ft).	
cf. Palintropus	Unnamed			Partial shoulder girdles	An ambiortiform bird	
cf. Paronychodon	cf. P. lacustris			Teeth	An indeterminate maniraptoran, also found in the Judith River	
cf. Pectinodon	Indeterminate			Teeth	A troodont	
Polyodontosaurus	P. grandis			Dentary, type specimen	Nomen dubium. Possibly synonymous with Latenivenatrix.	
Richardoestesia	R. gilmorei			Mandible, type specimen	A dromaeosaurid	
Richardoestesia	R. isosceles			Teeth	A dromaeosaurid	
Saurornitholestes	S. langstoni			Incomplete skeleton and teeth, type specimen. A dentary referred to Saurornitholestes was discovered that preserved tooth marks left by a young tyrannosaur.	A dromaeosaurid	
Stenonychosaurus	S. inequalis			Nearly complete skeleton and other partial skeletons, type specimen	A troodontid once thought to be a species of Troodon	

===== Tyrannosaurs =====
Tyrannosaurs from the Dinosaur Park Formation
Genus	Species	Location	Stratigraphic position	Material	Notes	Images
Daspletosaurus	D. horneri		Middle-Upper, ~75,6-75 Ma ago	CMN 350, partial skull and skeleton with left dentary (TMP 2010.121.0001)	A tyrannosaurine tyrannosaurid, also present in the Two Medicine Formation.	
Daspletosaurus	D. wilsoni?		Middle-Upper, ~76,5-75,8 Ma ago	Several specimens	A tyrannosaurine tyrannosaurid.	
Gorgosaurus	G. libratus		Lower-Middle, 76.5–75 Ma ago	Numerous specimens, type specimen	An albertosaurine tyrannosaurid whose fossils have been unearthed in the Judith River Formation and possibly the Two Medicine Formation. It was the most common large carnivore in the area.	
Tromerosaurus	T. solumons		Lower, ~76.72–76.35	Two partial skulls and skeletons	An albertosaurine tyrannosaurid; the holotype was collected from the upper strata of the underlying Oldman Formation.	

=== Other reptiles ===
==== Choristoderes ====
Choristoderes, or champsosaurs, were aquatic reptiles. Small examples looked like lizards, while larger types were superficially similar to crocodilians. Remains of the following Choristoderes have been found in the formation:

- Champsosaurus (at least 3 species)
- Cteniogenys sp. cf. antiquus (possibly another genus)

==== Crocodylians ====
Remains of the following Crocodylians have been found in the formation:

- Albertochampsa
- Leidyosuchus
- at least 1 unnamed taxon

==== Lizards ====
Remains of the following lizards have been found in the formation:

- Helodermatids
  - Labrodioctes
- Necrosaurids
  - Parasaniwa
- Teiids
  - Glyptogenys
  - Socognathus
- Varanids
  - Palaeosaniwa
- Xenosaurids
  - ?Exostinus

==== Plesiosaurs ====
Remains of the following Plesiosaurs have been found in the formation:

Plesiosaurs from the Dinosaur Park Formation
Genus	Species	Location	Stratigraphic position	Material	Notes	Images
Fluvionectes	F. sloanae			A partial skeleton consists of a partial rib and gastralium, and left humerus, along with gastroliths	An elasmosaur	Fluvionectes sloanae
Polycotylidae	indeterminate					Fluvionectes sloanae

==== Pterosaurs ====
Remains of the following pterosaurs have been found in the formation:

Pterosaurs from the Dinosaur Park Formation
Genus	Species	Location	Stratigraphic position	Material	Notes	Images
Cryodrakon	C. boreas			Several large and small specimens consist of a partial skeleton	An azhdarchid	Cryodrakon boreas
Pterosauria	indet				A indeterminate pterosaur	Cryodrakon boreas

==== Turtles ====
Remains of the following turtles have been found in the formation:

Genus	Species	Location	Stratigraphic position	Notes	Images
Adocus					
"Apalone"					
Aspideretoides	3 species				
Basilemys				A large Nanhsiungchelyid	
Boremys					
Judithemys					
Neurankylus					
Plesiobaena					
Testudinata	Indet				

=== Mammals ===
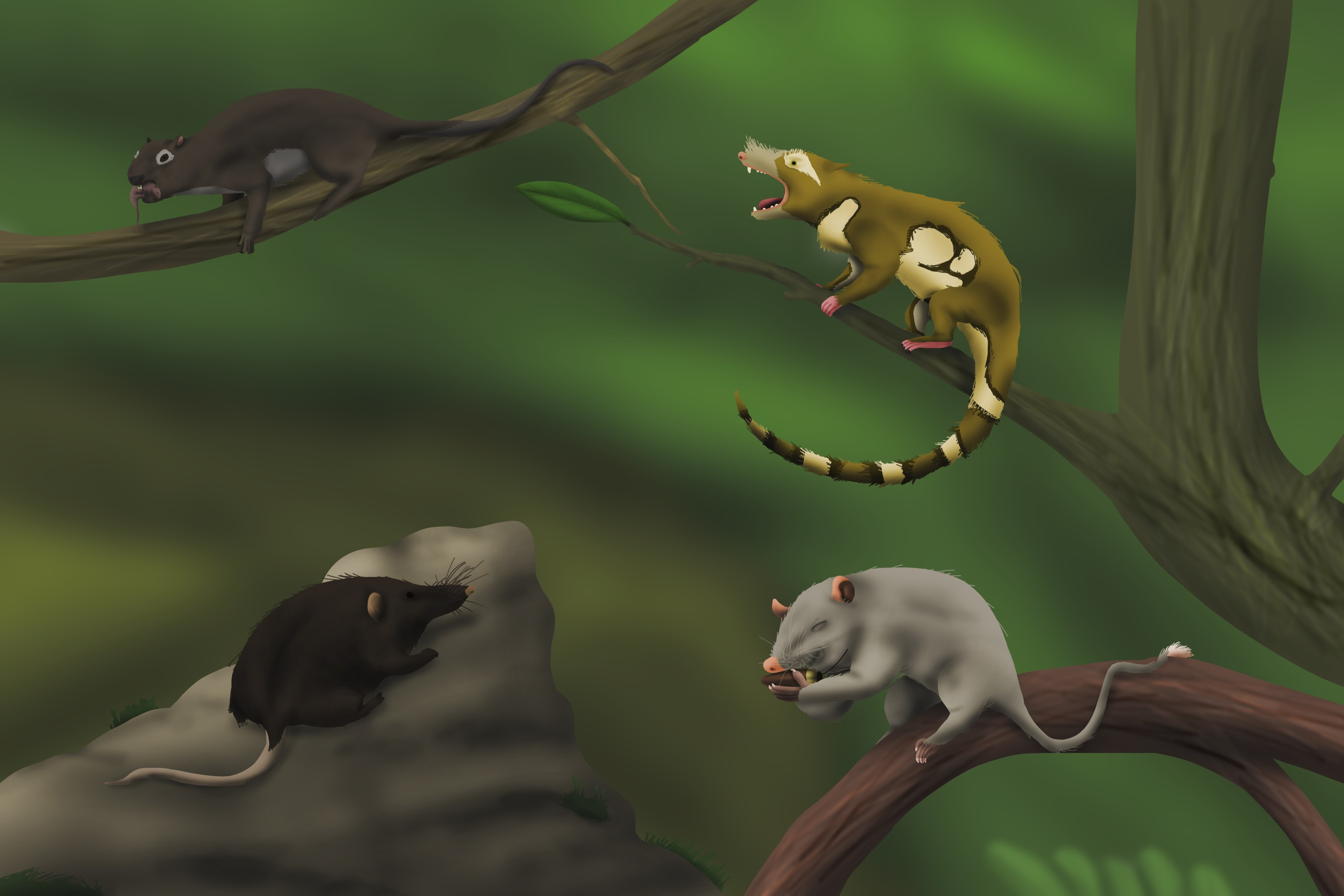
Collection of theriiform mammals known from the Dinosaur Park Formation: Mesodma primaeva (top left), Alphadon halleyi (top right), Gypsonictops lewisi (bottom left) and an indeterminate therian, interpreted here as an hypothetical early placental (bottom right)

Remains of the following mammals have been found in the formation:

==== Multituberculata ====
Multituberculatas from the Dinosaur Park Formation
Genus	Species	Location	Stratigraphic position	Material	Notes	Images
Cimexomys	C. sp.					
Cimolodon	C. spp.					
Cimolomys	C. clarki					
Meniscoessus	M. major					
Mesodma	M. primaeva					

==== Metatherians ====
Marsupials from the Dinosaur Park Formation
Genus	Species	Location	Stratigraphic position	Material	Notes	Images
Alphadon	A. halleyi				An alphadontidae marsupial	
Eodelphis	E. browni				A stagodont metatherians	
Eodelphis	E. cutleri				A stagodont metatherians	
"Pediomys"	P. sp					
"Pediomys"	P. sp					
"Pediomys"	P. sp					
"Pediomys"	P. sp					
"Pediomys"	P. sp					
Turgidodon	T. russelli				An alphadontidae marsupial	
Turgidodon	T. praesagus				An alphadontidae marsupial	

==== Eutherians ====
Eutherians from the Dinosaur Park Formation
Genus	Species	Location	Stratigraphic position	Material	Notes	Images
Cimolestes	C. sp.				A eutherian mammal with uncertain taxonomy	
Gypsonictops	G. lewisi				A leptictidan mammal	
Paranyctoides	P sternbergi				An early eutherian mammal	

=== Fish ===
Remains of the following fish have been found in the formation:

- Chondrichthyans
  - Cretorectolobus olsoni (a carpet shark)
  - Eucrossorhinus microcuspidatus (a carpet shark)
  - Ischyrhiza mira (a sclerorhynchid)
  - Meristodonoides montanensis (a hybodont shark)
  - Myledaphus bipartitus (a ray)
  - Protoplatyrhina renae (a guitarfish)
  - indeterminate orectolobid
  - "Edaphodontidae" indet. (a chimaera)
  - Elasmodus sp. (a chimaera)
  - Ischyodus bifurcatus (a chimaera)
  - Euselachii indet.
  - Archaeolamna kopingensis judithensis (a shark)
  - Carcharias cf. samhammeri (a shark)
  - Odontaspis aculeatus (a shark)
  - Cretorectolobus olsoni (a shark)
  - Batormophii indet.
  - Protoplatyrhina renae (a Rhino Ray)
- Acipenseriformes (sturgeons)
  - "Acipenser albertensis"
  - Anchiacipenser acanthaspis
  - unnamed sturgeon
  - unnamed paddlefish
- Holostean fish
  - Arotus hieroglyphus
  - Lepisosteus occidentalis (the gar)
  - unnamed bowfin
  - at least 2 other holosteans
- Teleost fish
  - Acronichthys sp. (an otophysan)
  - Archaeosiilik sp. (a pike)
  - Belonostomus longirostris
  - Cretophareodus alberticus (an osteoglossomorph)
  - Coriops amnicolus
  - Dercetis cf. magnificus
  - Enchodus indet.
  - Enchodus gladiolus
  - Enchodus petrosus
  - Estesesox foxi (a pike)
  - Horseshoeichthys armaserratus (an ellimmichthyiform)
  - Nunikuluk gracilis (a pike)
  - Oldmanesox canadensis (a pike)
  - Paralbula (including Phyllodus)
  - Paratarpon apogerontus (an elopomorph, like the tarpon)
  - Primuluchara laramidensis (a characin)
  - Sivulliusalmo sp. (a salmonid)
  - Acanthomorpha indet.
  - Clupeomorpha indet.
  - Elopiformes indet.
  - at least 8 other teleosts

=== Amphibians ===
Remains of the following amphibians have been found in the formation:

Amphibians from the Dinosaur Park Formation
Genus	Species	Location	Stratigraphic position	Material	Notes	Images
Albanerpeton	A. gracilis				A salamander-like Albanerpetontid amphibian	
Habrosaurus	H. prodilatus				A salamander	
Lisserpeton	L. sp				A salamander	
Opisthotriton	O. kayi				A salamander	
Scapherpeton	S. tectum				A salamander	
Tyrrellbatrachus	T. brinkmani				A frog	
Hensonbatrachus	H. kermiti				A frog	

=== Invertebrates ===
Remains of the following invertebrates have been found in the formation:

- Insects
  - Cordualadensa acorni (a cavilabiatid dragonfly)
- Freshwater bivalves
  - Fusconaia
  - Lampsilis
  - Sphaerium (2 species)
- Freshwater gastropods
  - Campeloma (2 species)
  - Elimia
  - Goniobasis (3 species)
  - Hydrobia
  - Lioplacodes (2 species)
- Marine Invertebrates
  - Placenticeras sp.
  - Palaeonephrops? (a clawed lobster)

== Flora ==
=== Plant body fossils ===
The following plant body fossils have been found in the formation:

- various ferns
- Equisetum (Equisetaceae)
- Gymnosperms
  - Platyspiroxylon (Cupressaceae)
  - Podocarpoxylon (Podocarpaceae)
  - Elatocladus (Taxodiaceae)
  - Sequoia (Taxodiaceae)
  - Sequoiaxylon (Taxodiaceae)
  - Taxodioxylon (Taxodiaceae)
- Ginkgos
  - Baiera
  - Ginkgoites
- Angiosperms
  - Artocarpus (Moraceae)
  - Cercidiphyllum (Cercidiphyllaceae)
  - Dombeyopsis (Sterculiaceae)
  - Menispermites (Menispermaceae)
  - Pistia (Araceae)
  - Platanus (Platanaceae)
  - Vitis (Vitaceae)
  - Trapa (Trapaceae)

==== Palynomorphs ====
Palynomorphs are organic-walled microfossils, like spores, pollen, and algae. The following palynomorphs have been found in the formation:

- Unknown producers
  - at least 8 species
- Fungi
  - at least 35 taxa
- Chlorophyta (green algae and blue-green algae)
  - at least 12 species
- Pyrrhophyta (dinoflagellates, a type of marine algae)
  - unassigned cysts
- Bryophytes (mosses, liverworts, and hornworts)
  - Anthocerotophyta (hornworts)
    - at least 5 species
  - Marchantiophyta (liverworts)
    - at least 14 species
  - Bryophyta (mosses)
    - at least 5 species
- Lycopodiophyta
  - Lycopodiaceae (club mosses)
    - at least 11 species
  - Selaginellaceae (small club mosses)
    - at least 6 species
  - Isoetaceae (quillworts)
    - at least 1 species
- Polypodiophyta
  - Osmundaceae (cinnamon ferns)
    - at least 6 species
  - Schizaeaceae (climbing ferns)
    - at least 20 species
  - Gleicheniaceae (Gleichenia and allies; coral ferns)
    - at least 5 species
  - Cyatheaceae (Cyathea and allies)
    - at least 4 species
  - Dicksoniaceae (Dicksonia and allies)
    - at least 3 species
  - Polypodiaceae (ferns)
    - at least 4 species
  - Matoniaceae
    - at least 1 species
  - Marsileaceae
    - at least 1 species
- Pinophyta (gymnosperms)
  - Cycadaceae (cycads)
    - at least 3 species
  - Caytoniaceae
    - at least 1 species
  - Pinaceae (pines)
    - at least 4 species
  - Cupressaceae (cypresses)
    - at least 3 species
  - Podocarpaceae (Podocarpus and allies)
    - at least 4 species
  - Cheirolepidiaceae
    - at least 2 species
  - Ephedraceae (Mormon teas)
    - at least 6 species
  - Unknown gymnosperms: at least 3 species
- Magnoliophyta (angiosperms)
  - Magnoliopsida (dicots)
    - Buxaceae (boxwood)
      - at least 1 species
    - Gunneraceae (gunneras)
      - at least 1 species
    - Salicaceae (willows, cottonwood, quaking aspen)
      - at least 1 species
    - Droseraceae (sundews)
      - at least 1 species
    - Olacaceae (tallowwood)
      - at least 2 species
    - Loranthaceae (showy mistletoes)
      - at least 1 species
    - Sapindaceae (soapberry)
      - at least 1 species
    - Aceraceae (maples)
      - at least 1 species
    - Proteaceae (proteas)
      - at least 9 species
    - Compositae (sunflowers)
      - at least 1 species
    - Fagaceae (beeches, oaks, chestnuts)
      - at least 2 species
    - Betulaceae (birches, alders)
      - at least 1 species
    - Ulmaceae (elms)
      - at least 1 species
    - Chenopodiaceae (goosefoots)
      - at least 1 species
  - Liliopsida (monocots)
    - Liliaceae (lilies)
      - at least 6 species
    - Cyperaceae (sedges)
      - at least 1 species
    - Sparganiaceae (bur-reeds)
      - possibly 1 species
    - Unknown angiosperms: at least 88 species

== See also ==
- List of dinosaur-bearing rock formations

== Bibliography ==
- Arbour, V. M.; Burns, M. E.; Sissons, R. L. (2009). "A redescription of the ankylosaurid dinosaur Dyoplosaurus acutosquameus Parks, 1924 (Ornithischia: Ankylosauria) and a revision of the genus". Journal of Vertebrate Paleontology. 29 (4): 1117–1135. Bibcode:2009JVPal..29.1117A. doi:10.1671/039.029.0405. S2CID 85665879.
- Braman, D.R., and Koppelhus, E.B. 2005. Campanian palynomorphs. In: Currie, P.J., and Koppelhus, E.B. (eds), Dinosaur Provincial Park: A Spectacular Ancient Ecosystem Revealed. Indiana University Press: Bloomington and Indianapolis, 101–130.
- Brinkman, D.B. 2005. Turtles: diversity, paleoecology, and distribution. In: Currie, P.J., and Koppelhus, E.B. (eds), Dinosaur Provincial Park: A Spectacular Ancient Ecosystem Revealed. Indiana University Press: Bloomington and Indianapolis, 202–220.
- Caldwell, M.W. The squamates: origins, phylogeny, and paleoecology. In: Currie, P.J., and Koppelhus, E.B. (eds). 2005. Dinosaur Provincial Park: A Spectacular Ancient Ecosystem Revealed. Indiana University Press: Bloomington and Indianapolis, 235–248.
- Currie, P.J. 2005. Theropods, including birds. In: Currie, P.J., and Koppelhus, E.B. (eds), Dinosaur Provincial Park: A Spectacular Ancient Ecosystem Revealed. Indiana University Press: Bloomington and Indianapolis, 367–397.
- Currie, P.J., and Koppelhus, E.B. (eds). 2005. Dinosaur Provincial Park: A Spectacular Ancient Ecosystem Revealed. Indiana University Press: Bloomington and Indianapolis, 648 p.
- Eberth, D.A. 2005. The geology. In: Currie, P.J., and Koppelhus, E.B. (eds), Dinosaur Provincial Park: A Spectacular Ancient Ecosystem Revealed. Indiana University Press: Bloomington and Indianapolis, 54–82.
- Fox, R.C. 2005. Late Cretaceous mammals. In: Currie, P.J., and Koppelhus, E.B. (eds), Dinosaur Provincial Park: A Spectacular Ancient Ecosystem Revealed. Indiana University Press: Bloomington and Indianapolis, 417–435.
- K. Gao and Brinkman, D.B. 2005. Choristoderes from the Park and its vicinity. In: Currie, P.J., and Koppelhus, E.B. (eds), Dinosaur Provincial Park: A Spectacular Ancient Ecosystem Revealed. Indiana University Press: Bloomington and Indianapolis, 221–234.
- Gardner, J.D. 2005. Lissamphibians. In: Currie, P.J., and Koppelhus, E.B. (eds), Dinosaur Provincial Park: A Spectacular Ancient Ecosystem Revealed. Indiana University Press: Bloomington and Indianapolis, 186–201.
- Godfrey, S.J., and Currie, P.J. 2005. Pterosaurs. In: Currie, P.J., and Koppelhus, E.B. (eds), Dinosaur Provincial Park: A Spectacular Ancient Ecosystem Revealed. Indiana University Press: Bloomington and Indianapolis, 292–311.
- Johnston, P.A., and Hendy, A.J.W. 2005. Paleoecology of mollusks from the Upper Cretaceous Belly River Group. In: Currie, P.J., and Koppelhus, E.B. (eds), Dinosaur Provincial Park: A Spectacular Ancient Ecosystem Revealed. Indiana University Press: Bloomington and Indianapolis, 139–166.
- Koppelhus, E.B. 2005. Paleobotany. In: Currie, P.J., and Koppelhus, E.B. (eds), Dinosaur Provincial Park: A Spectacular Ancient Ecosystem Revealed. Indiana University Press: Bloomington and Indianapolis, 131–138.
- Lexicon of Canadian Geologic Units. "Dinosaur Park Formation".
- Neuman, A.G., and Brinkman, D.B. 2005. Fishes of the fluvial beds. In: Currie, P.J., and Koppelhus, E.B. (eds), Dinosaur Provincial Park: A Spectacular Ancient Ecosystem Revealed. Indiana University Press: Bloomington and Indianapolis, 167–185.
- Ryan, M.J., and Evans, D.C. 2005. Ornithischian dinosaurs. In: Currie, P.J., and Koppelhus, E.B. (eds), Dinosaur Provincial Park: A Spectacular Ancient Ecosystem Revealed. Indiana University Press: Bloomington and Indianapolis, 312–348.
- Sato, T., Eberth, D.A., Nicholls, E.L., and Manabe, M. 2005. Plesiosaurian remains from non-marine to paralic sediments. In: Currie, P.J., and Koppelhus, E.B. (eds), Dinosaur Provincial Park: A Spectacular Ancient Ecosystem Revealed. Indiana University Press: Bloomington and Indianapolis, 249–276.
- Tanke, D.H. and Brett-Surman, M.K. 2001. Evidence of Hatchling and Nestling-Size Hadrosaurs (Reptilia:Ornithischia) from Dinosaur Provincial Park (Dinosaur Park Formation: Campanian), Alberta, Canada. pp. 206–218. In: Mesozoic Vertebrate Life—New Research Inspired by the Paleontology of Philip J. Currie. Edited by D.H. Tanke and K. Carpenter. Indiana University Press: Bloomington. xviii + 577 pp.
- Xiao-Chun Wu. 2005. Crocodylians. In: Currie, P.J., and Koppelhus, E.B. (eds), Dinosaur Provincial Park: A Spectacular Ancient Ecosystem Revealed. Indiana University Press: Bloomington and Indianapolis, 277-291
