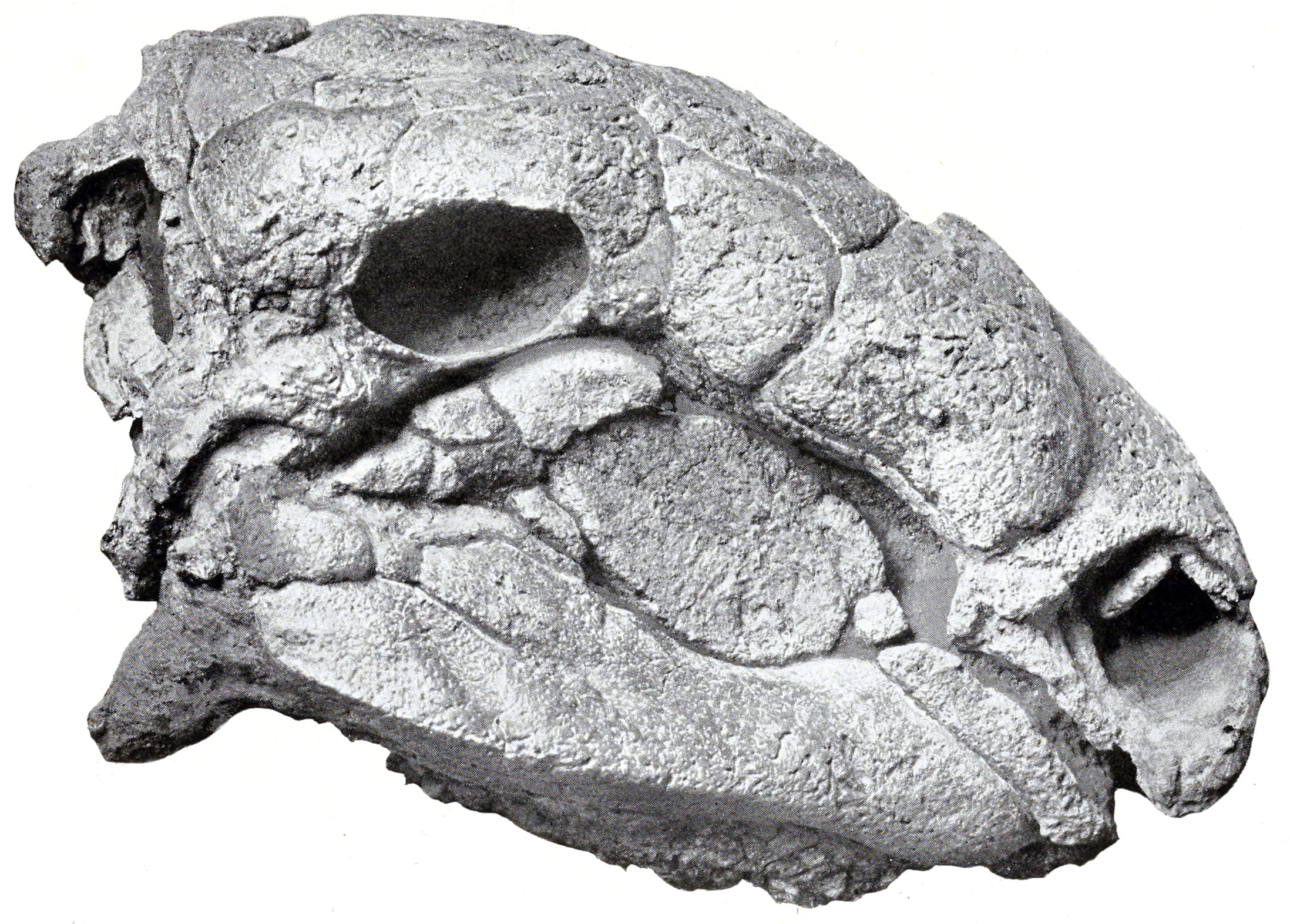
- Skull of holotype, CMN 2759

Scientific classification
- Kingdom: Animalia
- Phylum: Chordata
- Class: Reptilia
- Clade: Dinosauria
- Clade: †Ornithischia
- Clade: †Thyreophora
- Clade: †Ankylosauria
- Family: †Nodosauridae
- Subfamily: †Nodosaurinae
- Clade: †Panoplosaurini
- Genus: †Panoplosaurus; Lambe, 1919
- Species: †P. mirus

Binomial name
- †Panoplosaurus mirus Lambe, 1919

= Panoplosaurus =

Panoplosaurus Temporal range: Campanian, 76–75 Ma

Extinct genus of dinosaurs

Panoplosaurus is a genus of armoured dinosaur from the Late Cretaceous of Alberta, Canada. Few specimens of the genus are known, all from the middle Campanian of the Dinosaur Park Formation, roughly 76 to 75 million years ago. It was first discovered in 1917, and named in 1919 by Lawrence Lambe, named for its extensive armour, meaning "well-armoured lizard". Panoplosaurus has at times been considered the proper name for material otherwise referred to as Edmontonia, complicating its phylogenetic and ecological interpretations, at one point being considered to have existed across Alberta, New Mexico and Texas, with specimens in institutions from Canada and the United States. The skull and skeleton of Panoplosaurus are similar to its relatives, but have a few significant differences, such as the lumpy form of the skull osteoderms, a completely fused shoulder blade, and regularly shaped plates on its neck and body lacking prominent spines. It was a quadrupedal animal, roughly 5 m (16 ft) long and 1,600 kg (3,500 lb) in weight. The skull has a short snout, with a very domed surface, and bony plates directly covering the cheek. The neck had circular groups of plates arranged around the top surface, both the forelimb and hindlimb were about the same length, and the hand may have only included three fingers. Almost the entire surface of the body was covered in plates, osteoderms and scutes of varying sizes, ranging from large elements along the skull and neck, to smaller, round bones underneath the chin and body, to small ossicles that filled in the spaces between other, larger osteoderms.

Panoplosaurus was originally classified as a stegosaur related to the similarly armoured form Ankylosaurus, a group that was later divided with ankylosaurs becoming their own group. It was then considered close to Edmontonia in the subfamily Panoplosaurinae, but then moved into a general placement in Nodosauridae. Edmontonia was for a time considered the same taxon as Panoplosaurus, making it the only nodosaur from the Campanian of North America, but this was quickly disputed and they are now considered separate. Following consistent placements in phylogenetic analyses close to Edmontonia and the American taxon Animantarx, Panoplosaurus was placed into the clade Panoplosaurini, related but not close to Nodosaurus or Struthiosaurus, which it was considered close to around when it was named. Panoplosaurus is from deposits slightly younger than Edmontonia rugosidens, and existed alongside hadrosaurids like Corythosaurus and Lambeosaurus, ceratopsids like Centrosaurus, and the tyrannosaurid Gorgosaurus, as well as other small dinosaurs like Stegoceras, Dromaeosaurus and Ornithomimus, and various fishes, amphibians, crocodiles and pterosaurs.

== Discovery ==
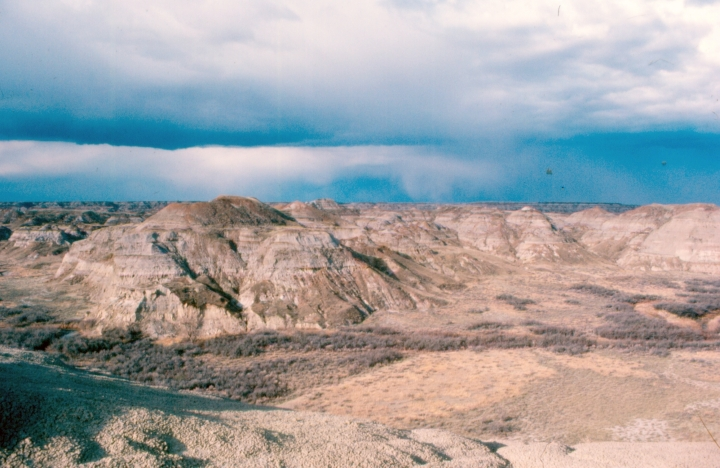
Outcrops of the Dinosaur Park Formation along the Red Deer River

In 1917, Canadian paleontologist Charles M. Sternberg of the Geological Survey of Canada discovered a complete skull and significant amount of the skeleton of an armoured dinosaur in the sandstone layers of Quarry 69 of the Belly River Group, 64 m (210 ft) above sea level. The specimen, designated by the Canadian Museum of Nature accession number CMN 2759, and excavated 4.43 km (2.75 mi) south of the mouth of the Little Sandhill tributary of the Red Deer River in Alberta, includes a nearly complete skull in articulation, most or all of the cervical vertebrae and the front dorsal vertebrae, and armour plates covering them, a majority of the disarticulated forelimb and three articulated fingers, a fragment of the pelvis and partial sacrum, a few bones of the foot, and multiple hundreds of osteoderms and dermal ossicles. This material was being described by Canadian paleontologist Lawrence M. Lambe of the Geological Society, who completed the description of the skull and osteoderms prior to his death in March of 1919. Lambe's work was published posthumously by the Royal Society of Canada, where he named the new material as Panoplosaurus mirus, and a supplemental description of the vertebrae and limb material, which Lambe had not yet gotten to, was published by Sternberg in 1921. The name Panoplosaurus derived from the hoplon of Greece, translating as "well -armoured lizard".

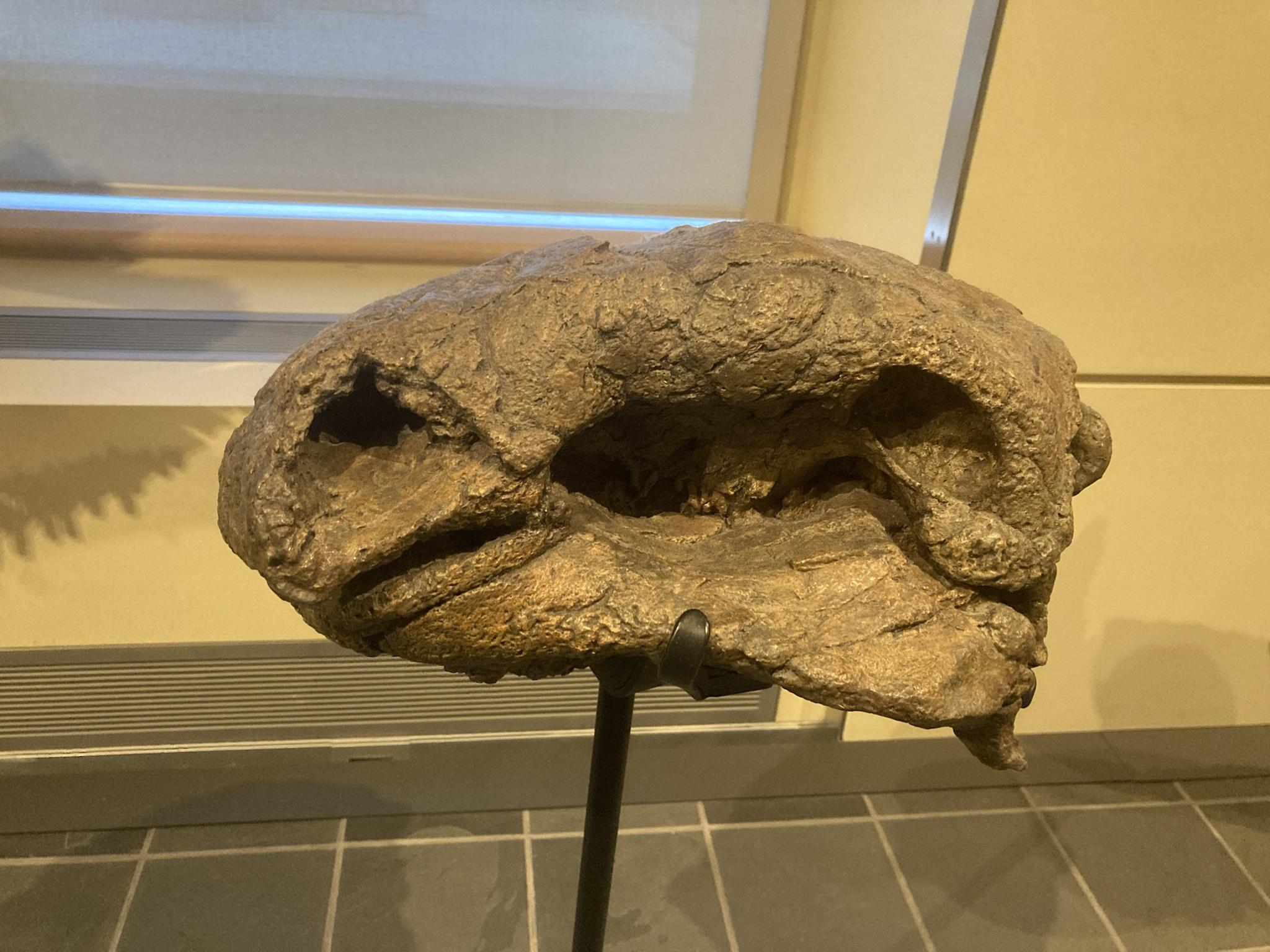
Left side view of holotype on display at Canadian Museum of Nature

While the beds of discovery of the holotype, CMN 2759, were originally described as the Belly River beds, they are now considered part of the upper level of the Dinosaur Park Formation, pertaining to the late middle Campanian, 75 to 76 million years ago. Many additional specimens have since been referred to the genus, including Royal Ontario Museum (ROM) 1215 and Royal Tyrrell Museum of Paleontology (RTMP) 83.25.2 from the Dinosaur Park Formation of Alberta, and an unnumbered Oklahoma Museum of Natural History (OMNH) scapulocoracoid from the Aguja Formation of Texas. A scapula from the Naashoibito member of the Kirtland Formation in New Mexico was referred to Panoplosaurus in 1981, but as it is from a different age and location from other specimens, may instead represent the ankylosaurid taxon Nodocephalosaurus, although this is uncertain due to lack of overlapping material. 18 other specimens in the ROM, CMN, American Museum of Natural History, and Princeton University were referred to the genus by Walter P. Coombs in 1978, but these were referred on the assumption that Edmontonia was a synonym of Panoplosaurus, which was considered unjustified by Kenneth Carpenter in a 1990 review on Late Cretaceous nodosaurids. The referral of ROM 1215 to Panoplosaurus was questioned by Coombs in 1990, and Roland A. Gangloff referred it and the Alaskan specimen DPMWA 90–25 to Edmontonia in 1995 based on the anatomy of the lack of diagnostic traits, but Victoria Arbour and colleagues retained ROM 1215 in Panoplosaurus in 2009, limiting the genus to it, the holotype CMN 2759, and specimen AMNH 3072, all from the upper Dinosaur Park Formation. Arbour and Philip J. Currie further restricted Panoplosaurus to just the holotype in 2016, as a result of uncertainties surrounding the referrals of various specimens between it, Edmontonia rugosidens and Edmontonia longiceps, all from the Dinosaur Park Formation and similar deposits.

== Description ==
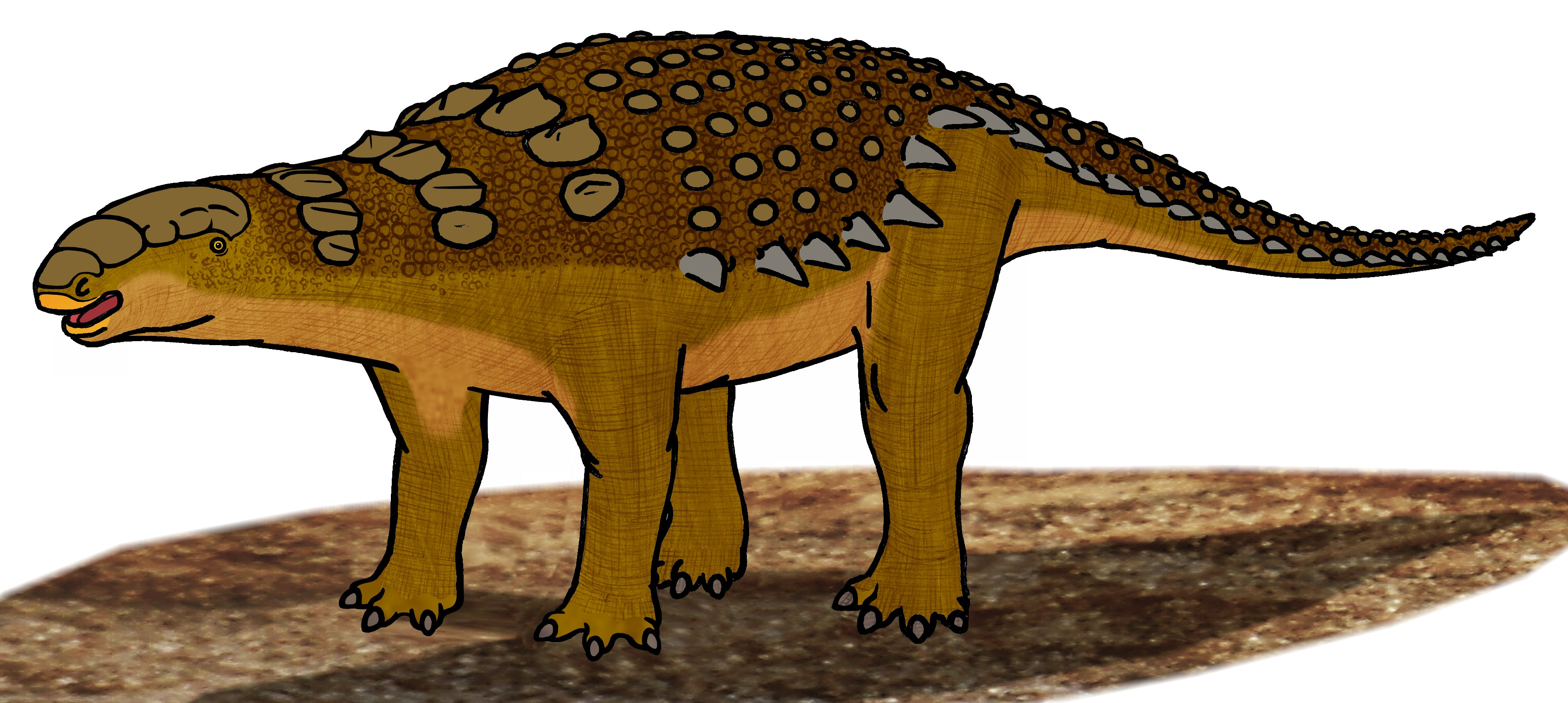
Life restoration

Panoplosaurus was a rather large animal at 1,600 kg (3,500 lb), a comparable size to other ankylosaurs from the same location, and heavier than or approximately equivalent to all predators it coexisted with. Panoplosaurus was about 5 m (16 ft) long, and was armoured like most ankylosaurs, but lacked prominent spikes anywhere on its body. The characteristics of its armour are one of the features that distinguishes Panoplosaurus from its relative and contemporary Edmontonia, along with a tapering snout, lumpy cranial armour, a swollen vomer bone in the palate, tall neural arches and neural spines in the vertebrae, a small and round coracoid fused to the scapula, and a hand that may have only had three digits. There is also a prominent armour plate covering the cheek in the type specimen of Panoplosaurus, which may be unique feature of the taxon, or individual, depending on what additional skulls are referred to P. mirus.

=== Skull ===
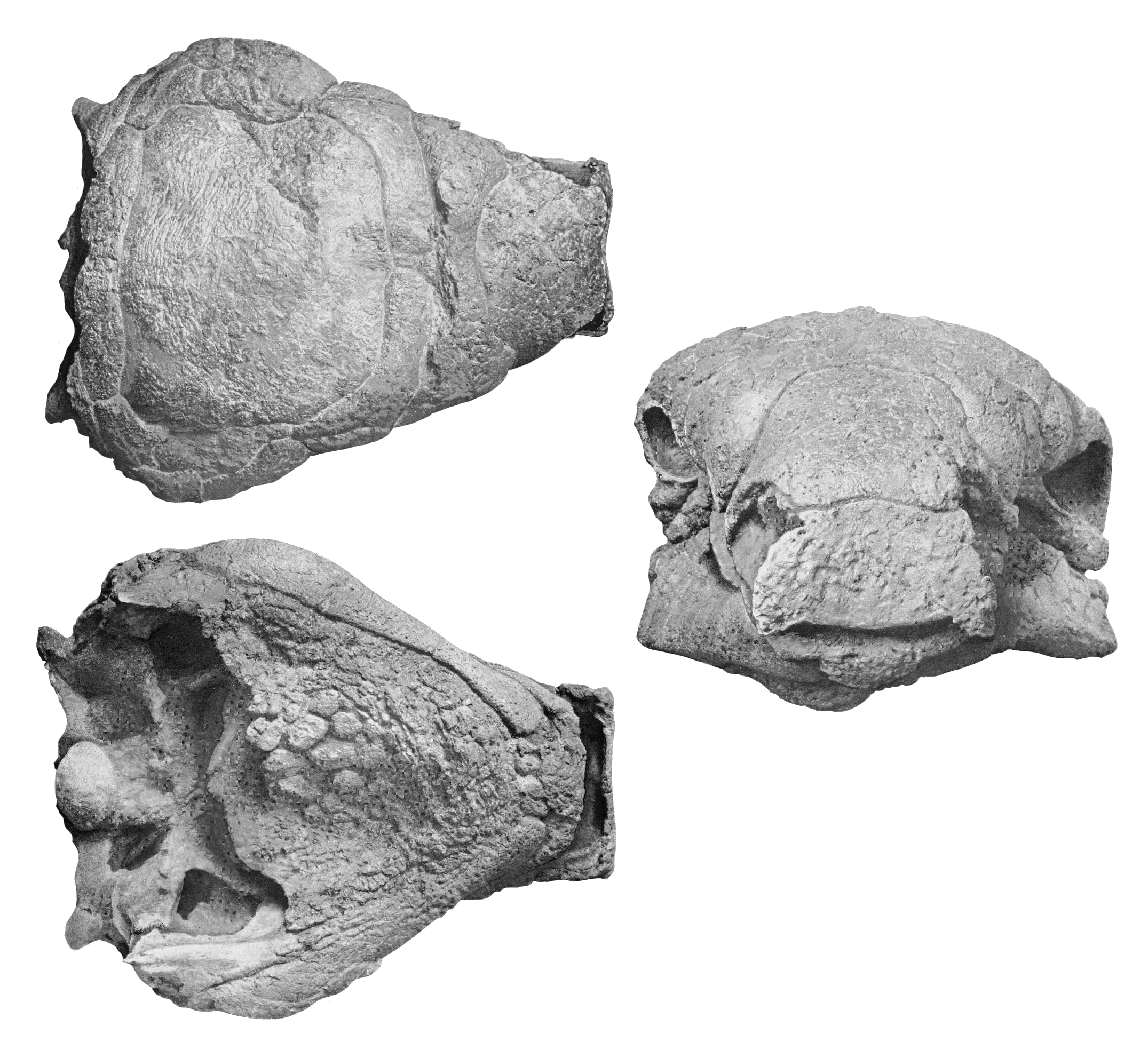
Skull of Panoplosaurus mirus CMN 2759 in dorsal, ventral, and anterior views

The skull of Panoplosaurus is broad and depressed, narrowing towards the end of the blunt snout to form a triangular shape. At a total length of 335 mm (13.2 in) in a straight line, the skull is curved in a way that across the skull roof the same length is 530 mm (21 in). Behind the orbits, the skull reaches its maximum width of 295 mm (11.6 in), giving it a very short and broad appearance. As other nodosaurid specimens from the same location that may be referred to Panoplosaurus lack the distinctively short snout of the holotype, it may be that its unique appearance is due to it being a different age or sex than other individuals. The orbits of Panoplosaurus are very small, and placed far from the snout, which is very squared and bearing laterally open nostrils. Bony plates are present across the entire exterior of the skull, including large osteoderms on all the sides of the skull and mandible, small scutes within the nostrils, and underneath the head in the form of an aggregation of small ossicles covering the surface between the two lower jaws. The occipital, where the skull articulates with the neck, is short and thick, facing nearly directly downwards, which would have meant the head was held with the snout down in life, about 20 degrees below the horizontal. Unlike in Edmontonia, the groove separating cranial osteoderms in Panoplosaurus never disappear, which show that there is a unique narrow scute across the entire rear of the skull.

Due to fusion and the covering of osteoderms, the only individual bone of the 310 mm (12 in) long mandible than can be identified is the predentary. The rami diverge strongly towards the read of the skull, where they curve inwards at the jaw articulation, and towards the front they bend inwards slightly where the predentary articulates with the dentary, with the thin predentaries meeting at the midline of the jaw. The mandibles are deepest near the rear of the skull, approximately maintaining their depth along the tooth row before narrowing sharply at the front where the predentaries are. Predentaries, which make up the lower portion of the snout, are somewhat horseshoe-shaped, form a sharp beak that fits within the overhang of the premaxillaries in the upper jaw. Both the predentaries and their premaxillary counterparts lack any teeth, a derived feature among nodosaurids where premaxillary teeth are sometimes present. The teeth of the mandible are hidden by armour on the right side, and on the left side of the skull where the cheek plate is not in place, the mandibular teeth are hidden by the teeth of the maxilla in the upper jaw. Eight maxillary teeth are preserved, and though it is not certain that was the full tooth count there is not room for many more in the jaw. All the teeth are similar to those of Edmontonia and Palaeoscincus, with a mild expansion of the crown above the root (cingulum), and denticles formed by prominent ridges on both the front and rear edges of the crown, though there are more on the front than rear edge of the tooth. There are not significant differences between the teeth of Panoplosaurus and those of other armoured dinosaurs.

=== Postcranial skeleton ===
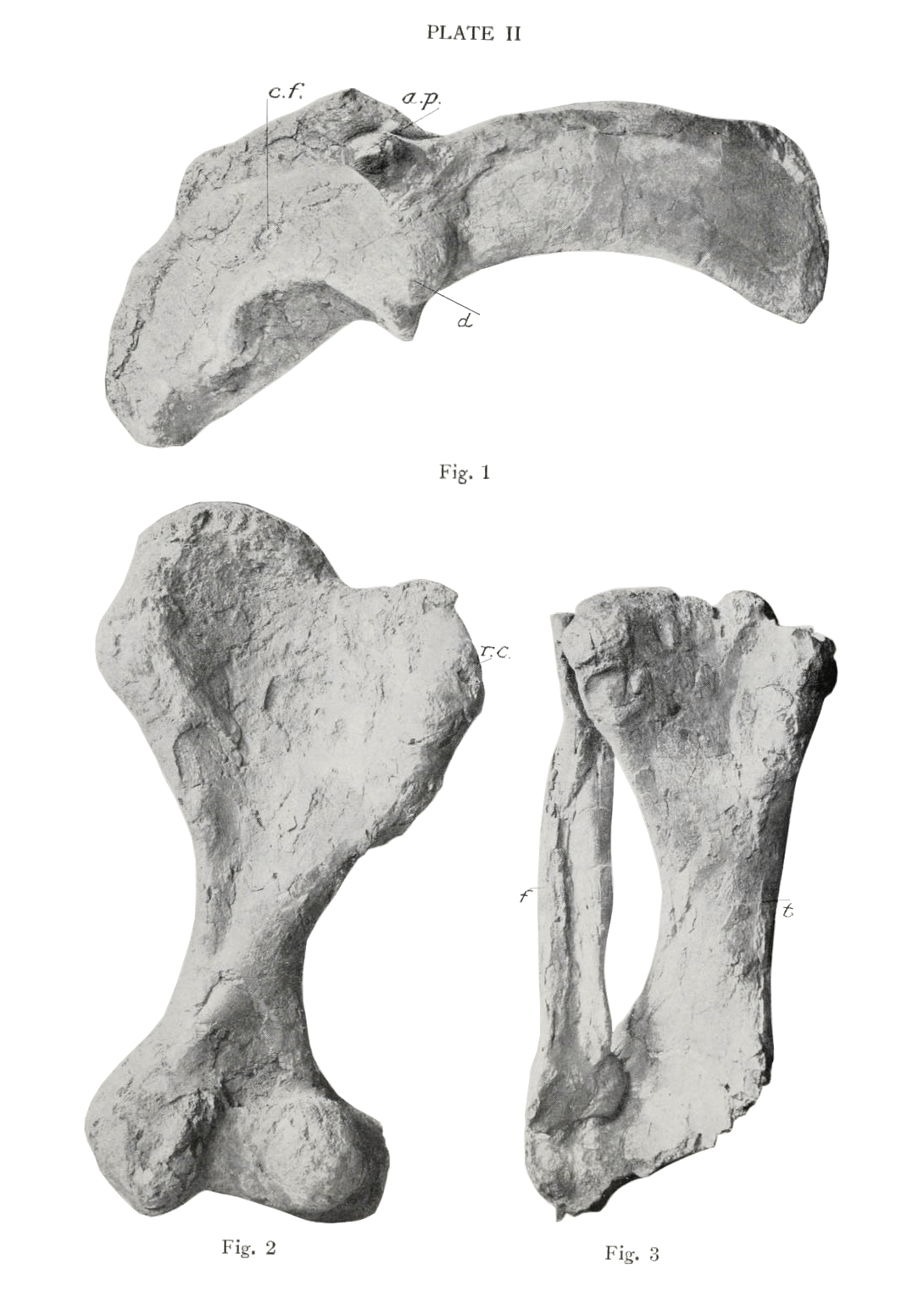
Scapulocoracoid, humerus, and tibia and fibula of Panoplosaurus holotype CMN 2759

The number of vertebrae in Panoplosaurus is unknown, as the dorsal and caudal series' are incomplete, and the cervical vertebrae are obscured by armour. The first three cervicals after the skull are fused together into one single ossification, a feature unique to Panoplosaurus and Edmontonia among ankylosaurs. Following the fused atlas-axis-third cervical complex, the next three cervicals are all identifiable, but very morphologically conservative, without significant differences along the series, all vertebrae being amphicoelous. Dorsal vertebrae are poorly preserved where present, but the synsacrum, but the synsacrum, as in other nodosaurids, is partially complete. Sternberg identified that the ilium of Panoplosaurus was supported by at least six vertebrae in 1921, which he identified as a dorsosacral, four true sacral vertebrae, and a caudosacral. The identification of four sacrals was questioned by Carpenter in 1990, as Edmontonia only has three true sacrals, but he was not able to definitively identify the first sacral of Sternberg as a dorsosacral. The neural spines of all four sacrals are fused into a single plate-like process. Few caudals are known in Panoplosaurus, but where preserved they are very similar to the corresponding elements of Ankylosaurus.

In Panoplosaurus the scapula and coracoid are completely fused together, with the only indication of the bone separation being a slight thickening along what would be the suture. The scapular region of the bone is relatively short, but is concave following the curvature of the body and curves down towards its distal end. Because of the curvature of the blade, the coracoid in Panoplosaurus sat at the front of the chest, as in Stegosaurus, Triceratops and Hadrosaurus. The top margin of the scapula forms a shelf as it approaches the coracoid, terminating in a prominent acromion process that projects outwards from the animal, and directly overhangs a large rugose attachment area for the deltoid muscle. The scapula itself is 410 mm (16 in) long, and the coracoid is 255 mm (10.0 in). The complete fusion of the scapulocoracoid is unique to Panoplosaurus. The humerus is a robust, 430 mm (17 in) long bone, with the shape and projection of the head suggesting the upper arm of Panoplosaurus was held in a flexed position in life. The only other portions of the forelimb known are three well-preserved, articulated digits of the hand, which may represent the complete hand suggesting Panoplosaurus had fewer fingers than its relatives. The manus was splayed, with two phalanges on the first digit, and three on the second and third. All ungual bones were hoof-shaped, lacking a point and bearing a flat bottom.

The only portions of the pelvis and hindlimb that are known in Panoplosaurus are the tibia, fibula, and a few isolated bones from the foot, the remainder being unpreserved. The right tibia and fibula were found still in articulation, with the 385 mm (15.2 in) tibia being noticeably longer than the 310 mm (12 in) fibula. As in ankylosaurids, the tibia of Panoplosaurus was shorter than the humerus, which contrasts with Stegosaurus and basal taxa like Scelidosaurus. This suggests that the forelimb of Panoplosaurus was only slightly shorter than the forelimbs. Both the metatarsal and phalanges of the foot resemble the corresponding elements of the hand, but are slightly larger and more robust. Though the tibia and fibula of Panoplosaurus are crushed, they appear to be straighter than the elements in Edmontonia, which are curved along their length.

=== Armour ===
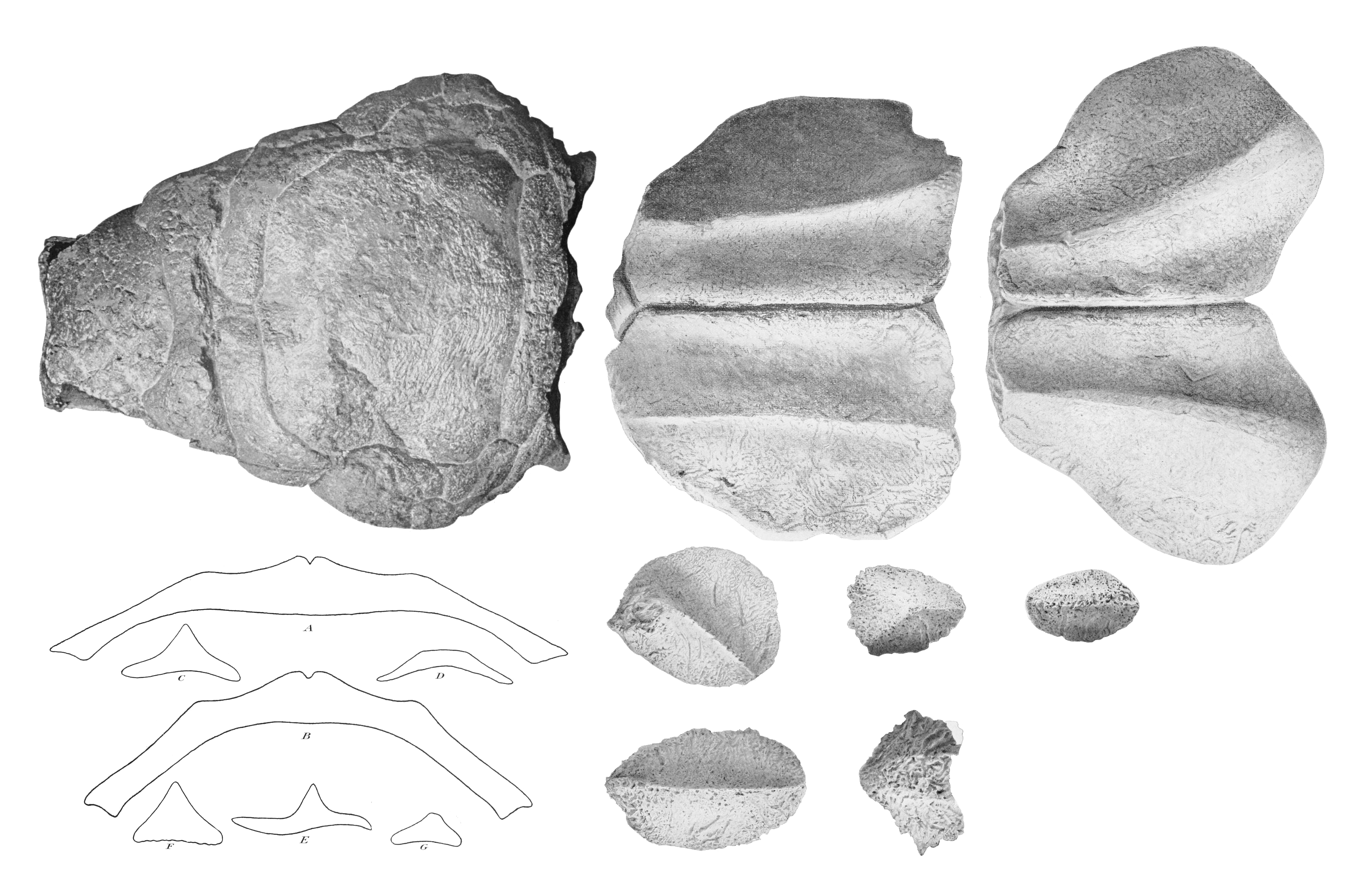
Osteoderms and arrangement of neck osteoderms of Panoplosaurus mirus

Armour from the neck and trunk of Panoplosaurus, some of it still in articulation with bones, is known. A gradient of sizes exist from plate-like paired elements through to indistinct ossicles. Where they have a distinct shape, the osteoderms are keeled, with the strength of the keel dependent on location. Lambe identified 7 different categories of osteoderms in his 1919 description of Panoplosaurus. The first kind was large, paired elements with a low keel, which formed bands around the neck leading from the head. On the sides of the neck to the back was a second kind, individual elements that were slightly smaller, suboval, and had a strong keel. Small, keeled scutes with a thick base were identified as the fourth osteoderm type, occurring on the underside of the base of the neck forwards to the chin. A fifth kind of osteoderms was identified as small, polygonal elements that fit together along the underside of Panoplosaurus, slowly grading into the larger rectangular elements of category two on the sides. Small irregular scutes lacking a keel were identified as a sixth form, and were suggested to have been from the limbs, though this was not definitive. The final form of scute were small ossicles, which occurred all over the animal filling in gaps between the larger osteoderms. The scutes along the top and sides of the neck in Panoplosaurus are the most distinct form, differing significantly from the corresponding elements in Edmontonia. Three bands of cervical osteoderms were present in both genera, consisting of rounder plates that united on the midline of the animal, and one narrower element on each side with a sharp keel. In Panoplosaurus both the first and second bands of neck osteoderms had a third pair, lower on the side of the animal, again possessing a sharper keel than the elements on the top of the neck. While Edmontonia possesses lateral spines on the rear neck and shoulders, these are absent in Panoplosaurus. The arrangement of the armour on the torso and tail of Panoplosaurus is unknown, as no elements were found in articulation or association with this region of the skeleton.

== Classification ==
Panoplosaurus was originally named simply as a genus of armoured dinosaur by Lambe in 1919, within the group Stegosauria, though it was subsequently specified by Sternberg in 1921 that within Stegosauria it was closest to taxa like Ankylosaurus and Euoplocephalus, and so within Ankylosauridae. The description of the new genus Edmontonia in 1928 by Sternberg identified it as a very close relative of Panoplosaurus, almost close enough to be considered the same genus, both being closely related to Palaeoscincus. Following further description of the armoured taxon Struthiosaurus by Franz Nopcsa in 1929, a different classification war proposed. Thyreophora replaced Stegosauria as the clade encompassing multiple families, with Panoplosaurus falling alongside Edmontonia, Dyoplosaurus, Hierosaurus, Scolosaurus and Stegopelta within the new subfamily Panoplosaurinae, which formed the family Nodosauridae with Nodosaurinae, Ankylosaurinae and Acanthopholinae. Nopcsa's classification of Panoplosaurinae was amended slightly by Charles W. Gilmore in 1930, who moved Palaeoscincus into the subfamily and removed Dyoplosaurus, which was discovered to have the skull of an ankylosaurine. Panoplosaurus was then placed in the new subfamily Edmontoniinae by Loris S. Russell in 1940, along with Edmontonia and Palaeoscincus, an equivalent classification to Gilmore's where Panoplosaurinae was used. Disagreeing with the classifications based on the work of Nopcsa, Evgeny Maleev moved Panoplosaurus into the family Ankylosauridae, which he considered to contain all ankylosaurs except Syrmosaurus.

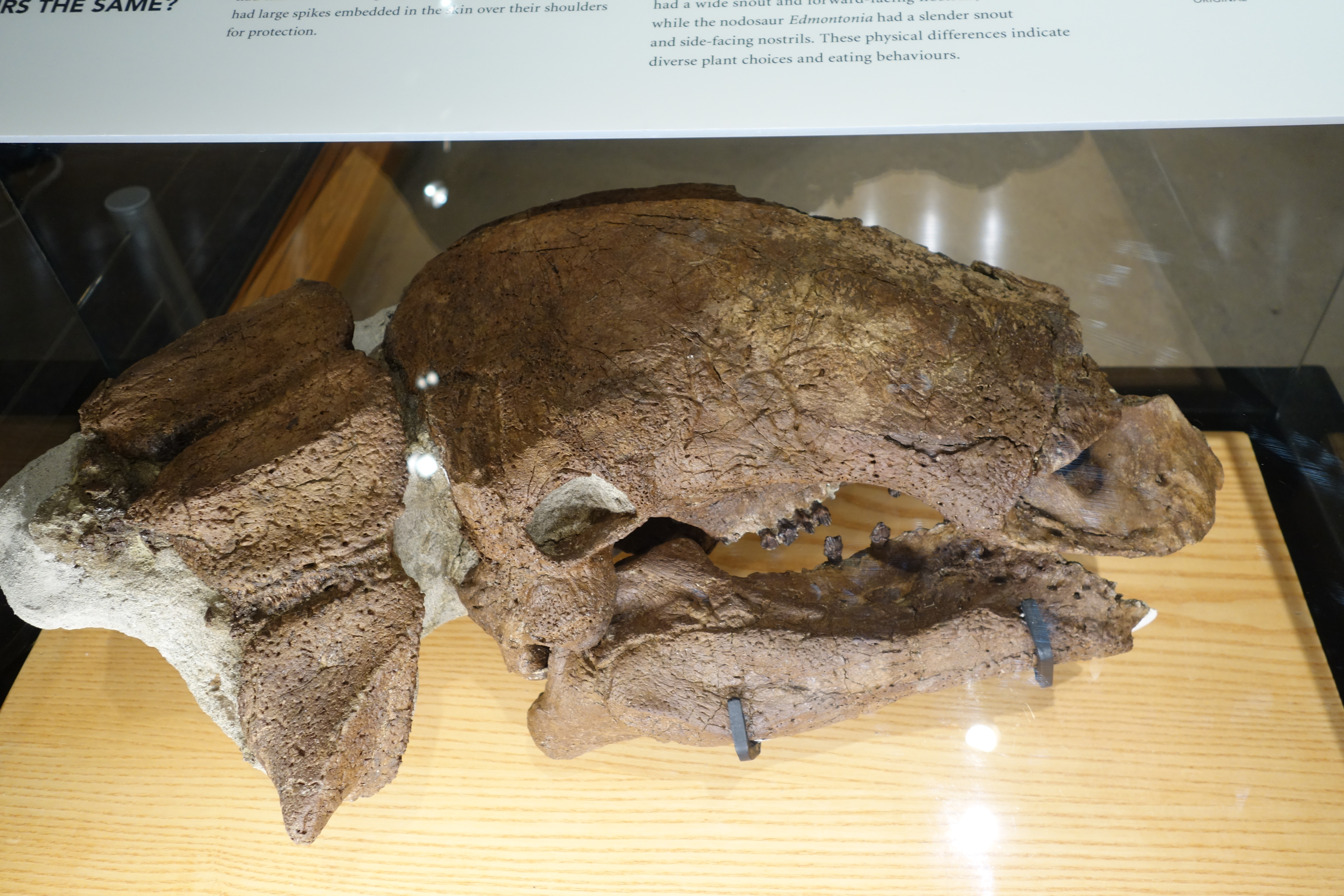
Skull of Edmontonia rugosidens in the RTMP, at times considered a species of Panoplosaurus

Coombs reviewed and revised the classifications of Ankylosauria in 1978, which he used as the group to encompass all heavily armoured ornithischians in a similar usage to Nodosauridae of Nopcsa. Within this suborder, he divided all taxa into two families, Ankylosauridae and Nodosauridae, distinguished by cranial and postcranial anatomy. Within Nodosauridae, which he considered a senior synonym of Acanthopholinae, Panoplosaurinae, Edmontoniinae, and other equivalent names, Coombs synonymized Panoplosaurus with Edmontonia, making Panoplosaurus the only Late Cretaceous nodosaurid from North America. Panoplosaurinae was then revived in 1986 by Paul Sereno, who used it to unite Panoplosaurus, Sauropelta, Silvisaurus and Struthiosaurus within Nodosauridae, excluding Hylaeosaurus and Polacanthus. Robert Bakker then redescribed specimens from the Late Cretaceous of North America in 1988, prompting him to separate Edmontonia rugosidens into the new subgenus Chassternbergia, remove a specimen from Edmontonia longiceps making it the new genus Denversaurus, and identify a former specimen of Panoplosaurus mirus as P. sp.. To distinguish the Panoplosaurus species from the Edmontonia complex, Bakker placed Panoplosaurus in Panoplosaurinae, and Edmontonia, Chassternbergia and Denversaurus in Edmontoniinae, uniting the two subfamilies into the family Edmontoniidae, which he placed in Nodosauroidea, the family Nodosauridae of Coombs' use elevated to superfamily rank. Carpenter further reviewed Late Cretaceous North American nodosaurids in 1990, concluding that Bakker's justification for separation was lacking; placing Chassternbergia and Denversaurus as junior synonyms of Edmontonia, and only narrowing down the classification of Panoplosaurus and Edmontonia to Nodosauridae. In 1998, Sereno modified his earlier position, using the name Nodosaurinae for the group of derived nodosaurids including Panoplosaurus, and informally defining the subfamily as all taxa closer to Panoplosaurus than Sarcolestes or Hylaeosaurus. Tracy Ford published a novel classification of Panoplosaurus in 2000, using osteoderm anatomy to divide Nodosauridae into Nodosaurinae including only Nodosaurus, Sauropeltinae including Sauropelta and Silvisaurus, Edmontoniinae including Edmontonia and a distinct Chassternbergia, and Panoplosaurinae including only Panoplosaurus.

The first phylogenetic analysis to include Panoplosaurus was that of Yuong-Nam Lee in 1996, where Panoplosaurus mirus, including both CMN 2759 and ROM 1215 nested next to Edmontonia, which included both E. longiceps and E. rugosidens, to the exclusion of all other nodosaurids. A similar union of Panoplosaurus and Edmontonia was recovered in 1998 by Jim Kirkland and colleagues, but the 2001 analysis of Carpenter instead recovered Edmontonia closest to Animantarx, while Panoplosaurus nested next to a clade of Sauropelta and Silvisaurus. The 2003 analysis of Robert Hill and colleagues resolved a group of Edmontonia and Animantarx, with Panoplosaurus as the sister taxon, and the analysis of Matthew Vickaryous et al. recovered Panoplosaurus and Edmontonia as sisters, though Animantarx was not analysed. Expansions on the analysis of Vickaryous and colleagues resolved the same clade of Panoplosaurus and Edmontonia with the additions of the nodosaurid Hungarosaurus, the ankylosaurid Crichtonsaurus benxiensis, the nodosaurid Struthiosaurus, and the supposed ankylosaurid Tatankacephalus. The next novel analysis was that of Richard Thompson and colleagues in 2012, combining previous ankylosaurian analyses into a single one to analyse both Nodosauridae and Ankylosauridae. Panoplosaurus was resolved next to Edmontonia, deep within an unresolved polytomy of all nodosaurids more derived than Animantarx, which included Niobrarasaurus, Nodosaurus, Pawpawsaurus, Sauropelta, Silvisaurus, Stegopelta, and Texasetes. In 2016, the phylogenetic analysis of Arbour and Currie initially meant to test the relationships of Ankylosauridae was expanded to include many of the nodosaurids known at the time, with Panoplosaurus limited to the holotype due to a lack of consensus about referred specimens. Following further modifications and expansions, Panoplosaurus was continually found within a group including Edmontonia and also at times Animantarx, Texasetes, Denversaurus (if considered separate from Edmontonia) and Patagopelta. As a result of this consistent support, Daniel Madzia and colleagues decided to name the clade uniting all taxa closer to Panoplosaurus than Nodosaurus or Struthiosaurus, giving it the formal name Panoplosaurini, modifying the suffix -inae from previous uses as it was continually nested within the clade Nodosaurinae. The reference phylogeny for Panoplosaurini designated by Madzia and colleagues was that of Rivera-Sylva et al. (2018), which is a modified version of the Arbour and Currie analysis expanded to include the Mexican taxon Acantholipan. Additional modifications to the analysis were done by Soto Acuña and colleagues in 2021 and 2024, with Panoplosaurus maintaining a position close to Edmontonia. Clades follow Madzia and colleagues.

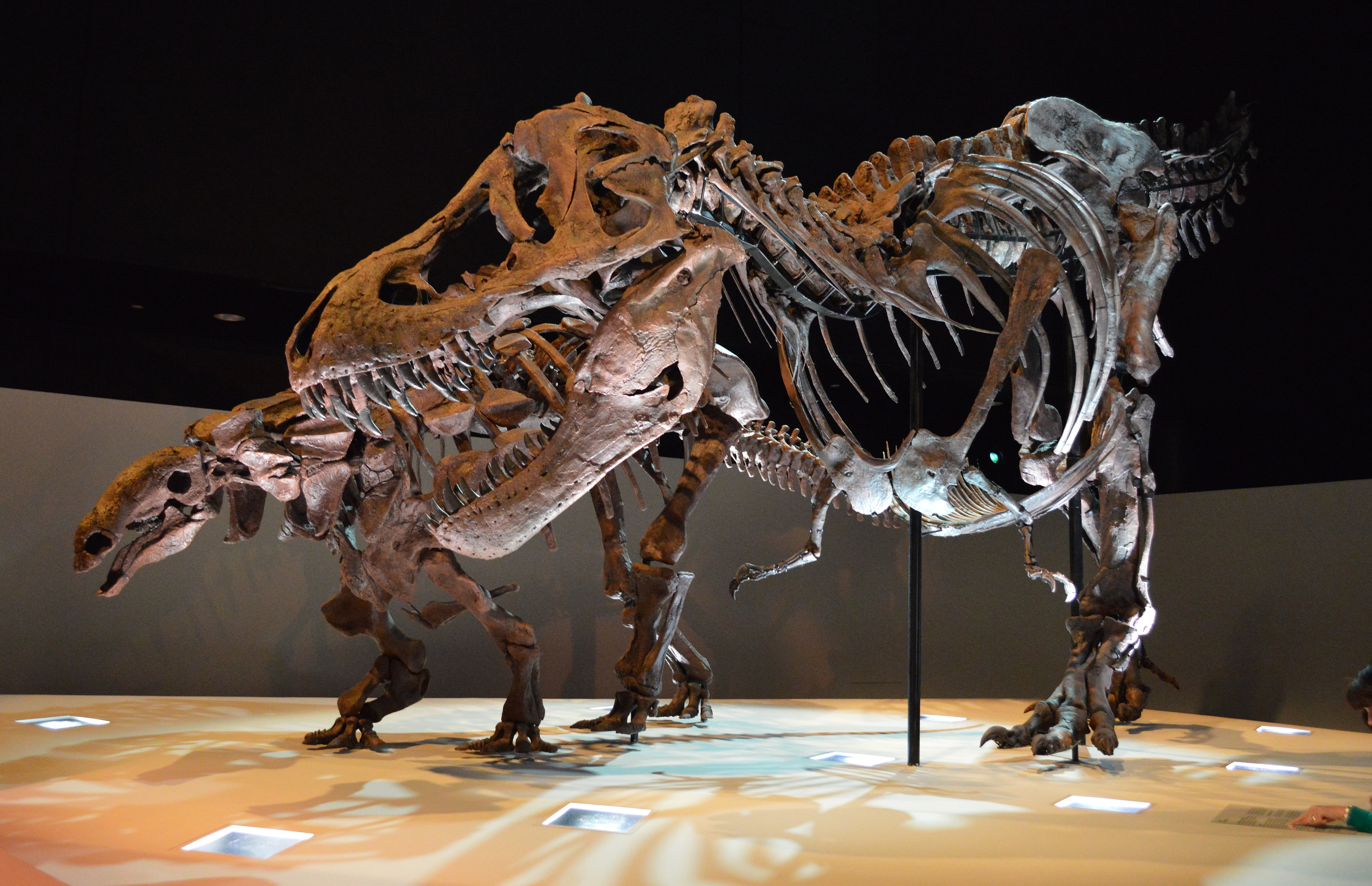
Mounted skeletons of Denversaurus and Tyrannosaurus, Houston Museum of Natural Science

- Nodosaurinae
  - Peloroplites
  - - - Sauropelta
      - Borealopelta
    - - Tatankacephalus
      - - - Nodosaurus
          - Struthiosaurini
        - Panoplosaurini
          - Animantarx
          - - Panoplosaurus
            - - Texasetes
              - - Edmontonia rugosidens
                - - Edmontonia longiceps
                  - Denversaurus

== Paleobiology ==
=== Feeding ===
Ankylosaurs were traditionally viewed as having a generic method of feeding due to their simple teeth, stiff skulls, and unspecialized musculature, comparable to modern iguanids. However, unlike iguanids ankylosaurs frequently have significant tooth wear, sometimes all the way down to the base of the crown. Nodosaurids normally have oblique wear facets on teeth, in Panoplosaurus having a single wear facet per tooth which changes angulation across the tooth row, going from sub-vertical at the snout to nearly horizontal at the back of the mouth. This differs from ankylosaurids, but may be due to the alignment of teeth between the upper and lower jaws, instead of a difference in form of mastication. While the shape of teeth in Panoplosaurus and other ankylosaurs suggests a simple, soft food diet, their variability implies a less restrictive feeding strategy. Nodosaurid teeth are more blade-shaped than those of ankylosaurids, a possible evolutionary response to a tougher, fibrous diet. However, microwear on the teeth of ankylosaurids and Panoplosaurus instead show that their diets were not significantly different, with regular pitting and abrasion showing a diet consisting occasionally of fruit as well as more abundant foliage. Stomach contents of the closely related taxon Borealopelta were identified amongst gastroliths, showing that at least it had a diet regularly consisting of almost 85% fern material, along with 3.7% cycad matter, trace elements of conifers, and 11.4% undiagnostic plant remains. Gastroliths may have been found with Panoplosaurus as well, but their identification is uncertain as they were not originally mentioned among the material found as part of the specimen.

=== Airways and senses ===
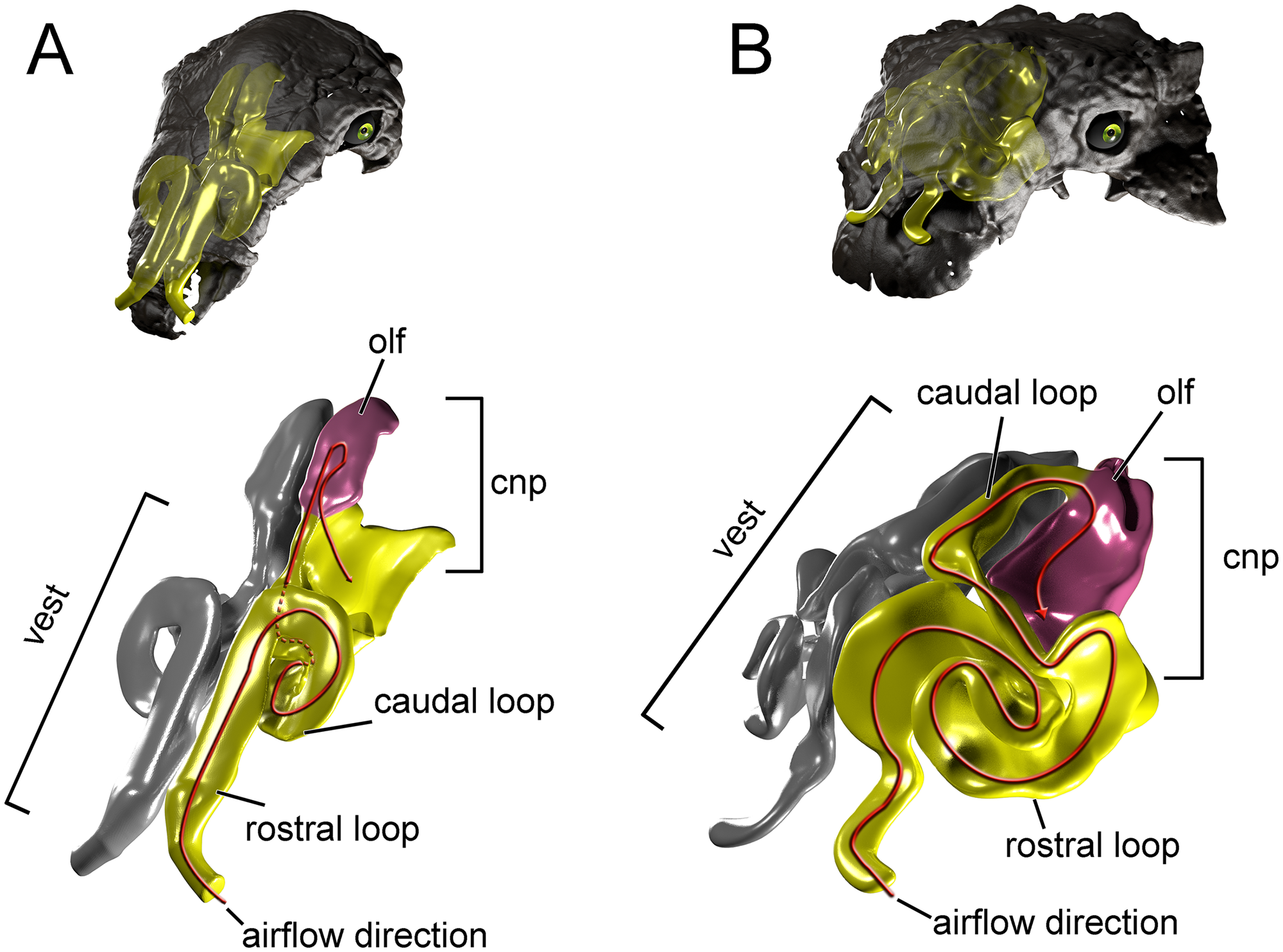
Skulls of Panoplosaurus (left) and Euoplocephalus (right) and their respective sinuses

While nodosaurids were traditionally thought to have had simply sinuses, lacking complicated cavities and paranasal sinuses. While this can be seen in some taxa like Edmontonia, the nasal system of Panoplosaurus is far more complex than previously thought. The complete nasal passage of Panoplosaurus undergoes two complete 360 degree loops in different planes along its length, before entering the olfactory recess for scent processing. However, while the shape of the nasal passages is more complicated, Panoplosaurus does lack the additional parallel sinus tracts that can be found in ankylosaurids like Euoplocephalus. It is possible that the function of these complicated sinuses was to warm incoming air as it passed through the skull. Inflowing air in Panoplosaurus was simulated to undergo a raise of between 17.9 and 18.2 °C (64.2 and 64.8 °F), primarily in the elongate nasal passage, while saturating the air with moisture. This is less heat efficient than the more complicated sinuses of Euoplocephalus, but still shows that the sinus cavities of Panoplosaurus increased the recovery of lost heat and moisture by over 60%.

The brain of Panoplosaurus takes up 33% of the length of the skull, similar to the nodosaurid Pawpawsaurus where the value is 30%, a higher value than in ankylosaurids. Panoplosaurus had a similar sense of smell to both Pawpawsaurus and Euoplocephalus, with the ratio between the length of the olfactory bulb and cerebral hemisphere being 44.0, 46.2 and 54.0 respectively. However, the size of the region of the brain devoted to the sense of smell is smaller in Panoplosaurus than expected for an animal of its size.

== Paleoecology ==
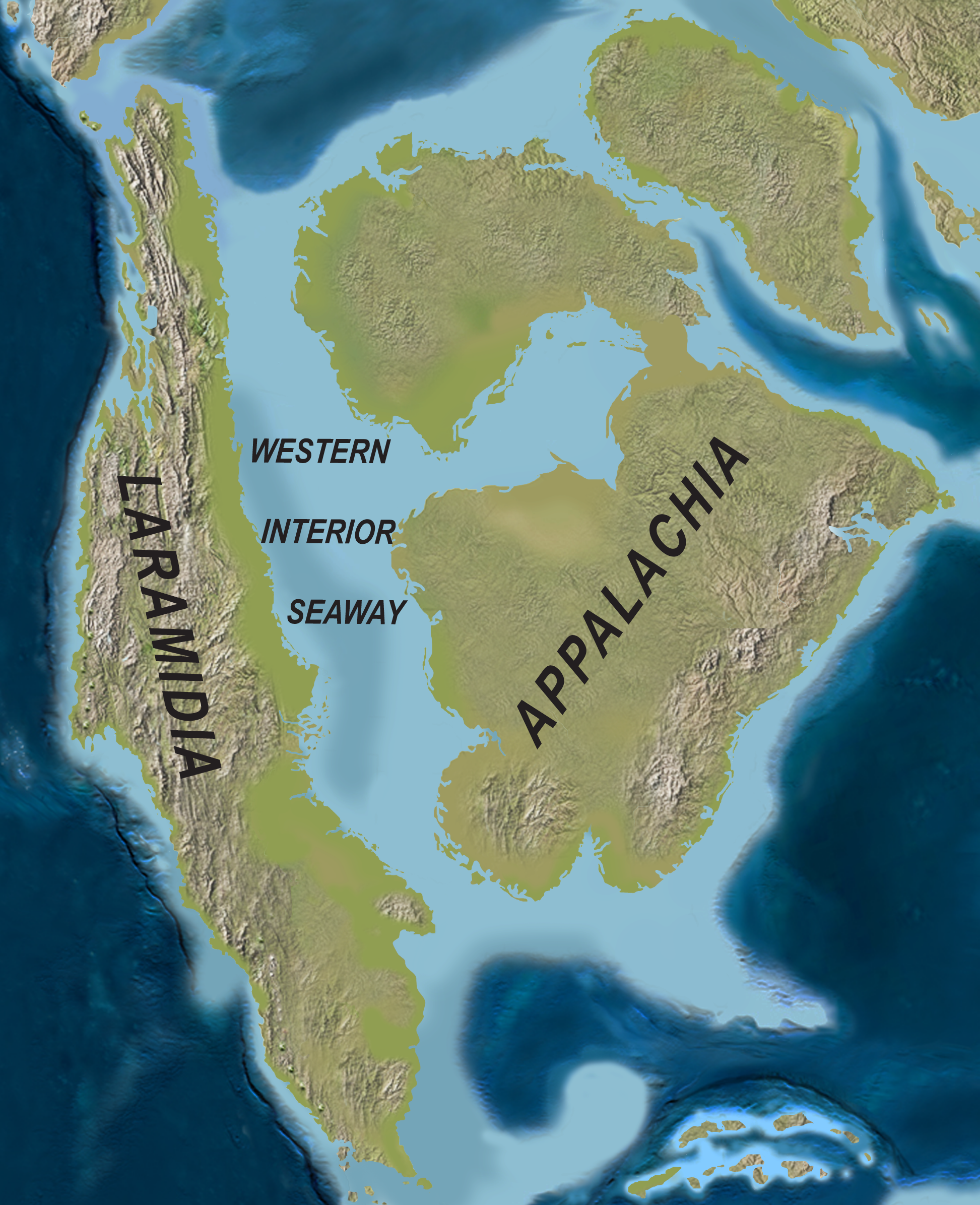
Map of North America and the Western Interior Seaway 75 mya

The Belly River series, as it was known when the first fossils of Panoplosaurus were found, is now known as the Belly River Group, spanning the Campanian Foremost, Oldman, and Dinosaur Park formations. Along the Red Deer River, only the Oldman and Dinosaur Park formations are exposed, reaching a thickness of around 90 m (300 ft). Panoplosaurus is only known from the Dinosaur Park Formation, which has been constrained in age between 76.47 and 74.44 million years ago by radiocarbon dating, and divided into three faunal zones. The oldest faunal zone is identified by the coexistence of Corythosaurus and the ceratopsid Centrosaurus apertus, and transitioned at 75.77 million years ago into a fauna characterized by Prosaurolophus maximus and the ceratopsid Styracosaurus albertensis. The youngest faunal zone coincides with the presence of bituminous coal at 75.098 mya, and the replacement of the common megaherbivores from older beds with the much rarer Lambeosaurus magnicristatus, and ceratopsids including Chasmosaurus irvinensis and a ceratopsid similar to Achelousaurus. Panoplosaurus is known from less than five definitive individuals that have been found within 24 to 31 m (79 to 102 ft) above the base of the formation, overlapping with the range of the youngest individuals of Centrosaurus apertus and the oldest individuals of Styracosaurus albertensis.

=== Palaeoenvironment ===
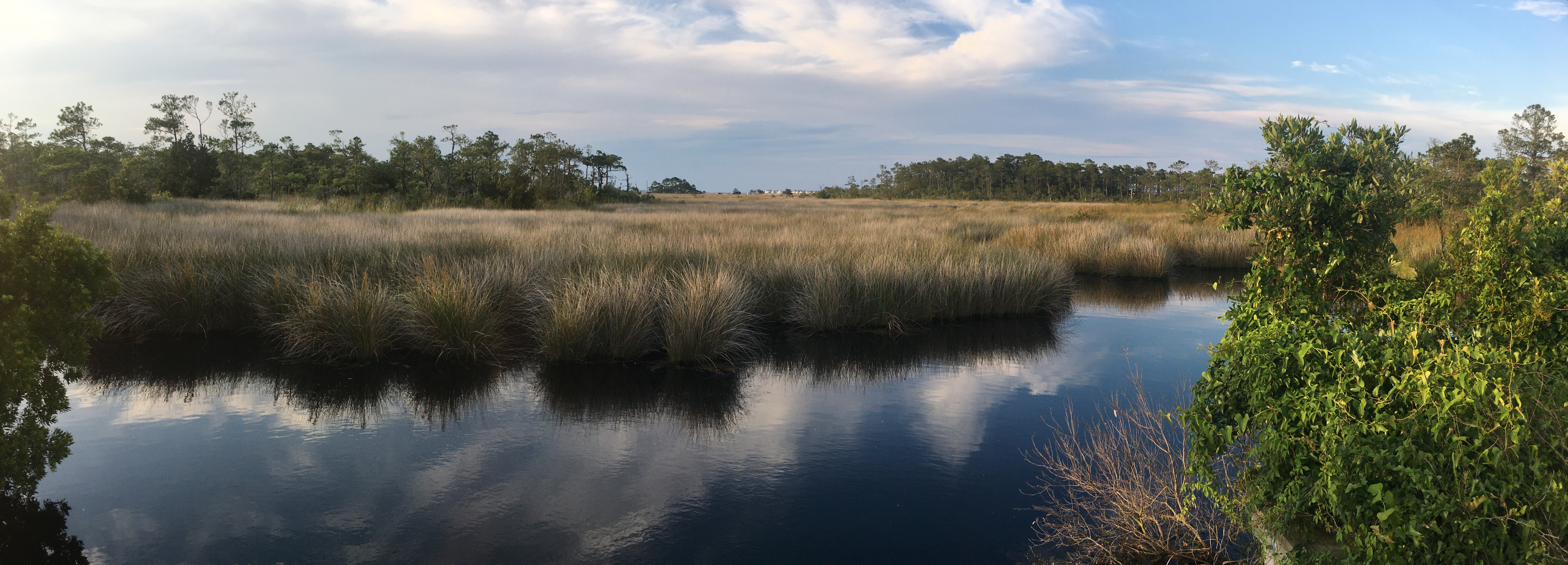
Marshland of Roanoke Island, North Carolina

With the exception of the mud-dominated coal zone, the sediments of the Dinosaur Park Formation are indicative of an alluvial environment with channels and overbanks of river channels of both low and high sinuosity. Some channel widths may even have exceeded 200 m (660 ft), flowing east towards the Bearpaw Sea across the coastal plain. While some studies suggest that the Dinosaur Provincial Park region of the Dinosaur Park Formation was under both river and oceanic influence, there are no signs of tidal influence, placing the deposits further inland above the potential for any backwater from tidal change. The Dinosaur Park Formation was deposited on a low slope during the start of the last major marine transgression of the shallow Western Interior Seaway that spanned central North America, where it expanded westward to cover the region in the marine deposits of the Bearpaw Formation. The environment of the coal zone directly before the submersion is less studied, but it shows mixed freshwater-brackish-marine assemblages and coastal erosion.

The cordillera to the west of Alberta was tectonically active, with volcanic eruptions spreading ash into the formation, and warmer climates than modern with little to no frost. There may have been seasonality of wetter and drier parts of the year, allowing for a diversity in plants and animals. The rivers of the coastal plain were lined with narrow zones of dense vegetation, and as the seaway approached, some areas would see periodic flooding or even standing swamps or mires that accumulated into the coal deposits. The ground would have been wet everywhere, with conifers dominating the canopy while ferns, tree ferns, and flowering herbs and shrubs formed the understory. The ground would have been covered with mosses, lichens, and fungi, and a layer of decaying plant matter. Standing water would be vegetated by water plants and algae. Insects were plentiful, with the streams and surrounding environment inhabited by clams, snails, fish, turtles, and crocodiles, as well as pterosaurs, dinosaurs, and small mammals. The landscape would have resembled the swampy coastal plains of the modern Carolinas.

=== Contemporary fauna ===
A rich and diverse vertebrate assemblage is known from the Dinosaur Park Formation, with the lower region, excluding the Lethbridge Coal Zone, being formed by terrestrial and coastal deposits. The constant presence of water in the formation led many forms of freshwater or marine animals to enter the otherwise predominantly terrestrial ecosystem. In the lower Dinosaur Park Formation, assemblages of crevasse sites show that the freshwater clam Sphaerium was the most common mollusk, and it occurred with abundant gastropods of the genera Goniobasis and Lioplacodes. A variety of forms of fish are present in the fluvial beds of the formation, including chondrichthyans, teleosts and other ray-finned fishes. The ray Myledaphus is characteristic of the formation and lived alongside the less common shark Hybodus montanensis, and paddlefish, sturgeons, bowfins, the aspidorhynchid Belonostomus, the gar Lepisosteus, and small teleosts including Paratarpon and Cretophareodus. At least nine forms of amphibians were present in the formation, including the salamander-like Albanerpeton, frogs, and salamanders from the genera Scapherpeton, Lisserpeton, Opisthotriton, Habrosaurus. Turtles are common and represented by the baenids Plesiobaena, Boremys and Neurankylus, the macrobaenid Judithemys, an unnamed but new form of snapping turtle, the primitive trionychoids Adocus and Basilemys, and the softshelled turtles Apalone and Aspideretoides. Six small lizards are known but no snakes, with the teiids Socognathus and Glyptogenys, the xenosaurid Exostinus, the helodermatid Labrodioctes, the necrosaurid Parasaniwa, and the varanid Palaeosaniwa. Choristoderes, an extinct group of semi-aquatic animals with crocodilian features, are represented by Cteniogenys and many well-preserved skulls and skeletons of its relative Champsosaurus. The major types of Cretaceous mammals have been found in the formation: the multituberculates Cimexomys, Cimolodon, Cimolomys, Meniscoessus, and Mesodma, the marsupials Alphadon, Eodelphis, Pediomys, and Turgidodon, and the placentals Cimolestes, Gypsonictops, and Paranyctoides.

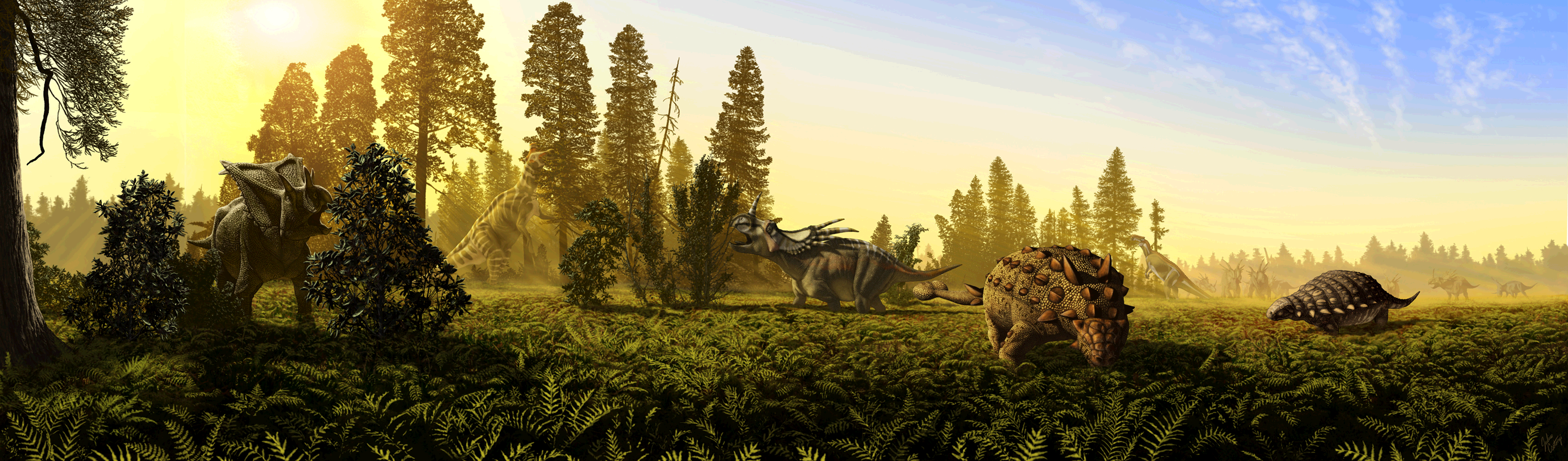
Depiction of megaherbivores in the Dinosaur Park Formation, Panoplosaurus on the far right

Microfossil sites are common, but a taphonomic bias is present in the formation towards the better preservation of large-bodied animals like Panoplosaurus. Mosasaurs and plesiosaurs are both known from the formation, though apart from the relatively complete elasmosaurid Fluvionectes, both are poorly known. Two or three true crocodilians are known, including the genera Leidyosuchus and Albertochampsa, and two pterosaurs have been found, the azhdarchid Cryodrakon and an unnamed pterodactyloid. While no other dinosaurs were recovered at the same sites as any Panoplosaurus specimens, correlation and comparisons of localities throughout the formation show it coexisted with a large variety of animals. The herbivorous fauna of the formation can be divided into two Megafaunal Assemblage Zones, defined as the lowest 28 m (92 ft) directly above the Oldman Formation, and the deposits above where the common ceratopsid Centrosaurus and hadrosaurid Parasaurolophus are absent. Panoplosaurus, which is from the top portion of the older MAZ-1 to the bottom portion of the younger MAZ-2, and would have coexisted with the ankylosaurid Euoplocephalus, nodosaurid Edmontonia, ceratopsids Centrosaurus, Styracosaurus and Chasmosaurus belli, and hadrosaurids Corythosaurus intermedius, Lambeosaurus clavinitialis, Lambeosaurus lambei, and Parasaurolophus. As well as herbivorous megafauna, unnamed ornithopods, the primitive ceratopsian Unescoceratops and the pachycephalosaurians Stegoceras validum, Stegoceras sternbergi and Stegoceras brevis are known from the formation, though their stratigraphic correlations are uncertain. Among theropods, the dromaeosaurids Dromaeosaurus and Saurornitholestes are known, the former from a single specimen of uncertain provenance, and the latter from many specimens such as teeth throughout the entire formation, and troodontids from the MAZ-1 are limited to Stenonychosaurus while Latenivenatrix is known from MAZ-2. Three genera of oviraptorosaurs are known, all of which likely coexisted in the formation: Caenagnathus, Chirostenotes and Citipes. It is possible that a therizinosaur was present based on a single frontal bone, and three ornithomimosaurs are preserved in the MAZ-1, Rativates, Ornithomimus, and Struthiomimus. The only large theropods to coexist with Lambeosaurus were the tyrannosaurids Gorgosaurus and an unnamed species of Daspletosaurus.

== See also ==
- Timeline of ankylosaur research
