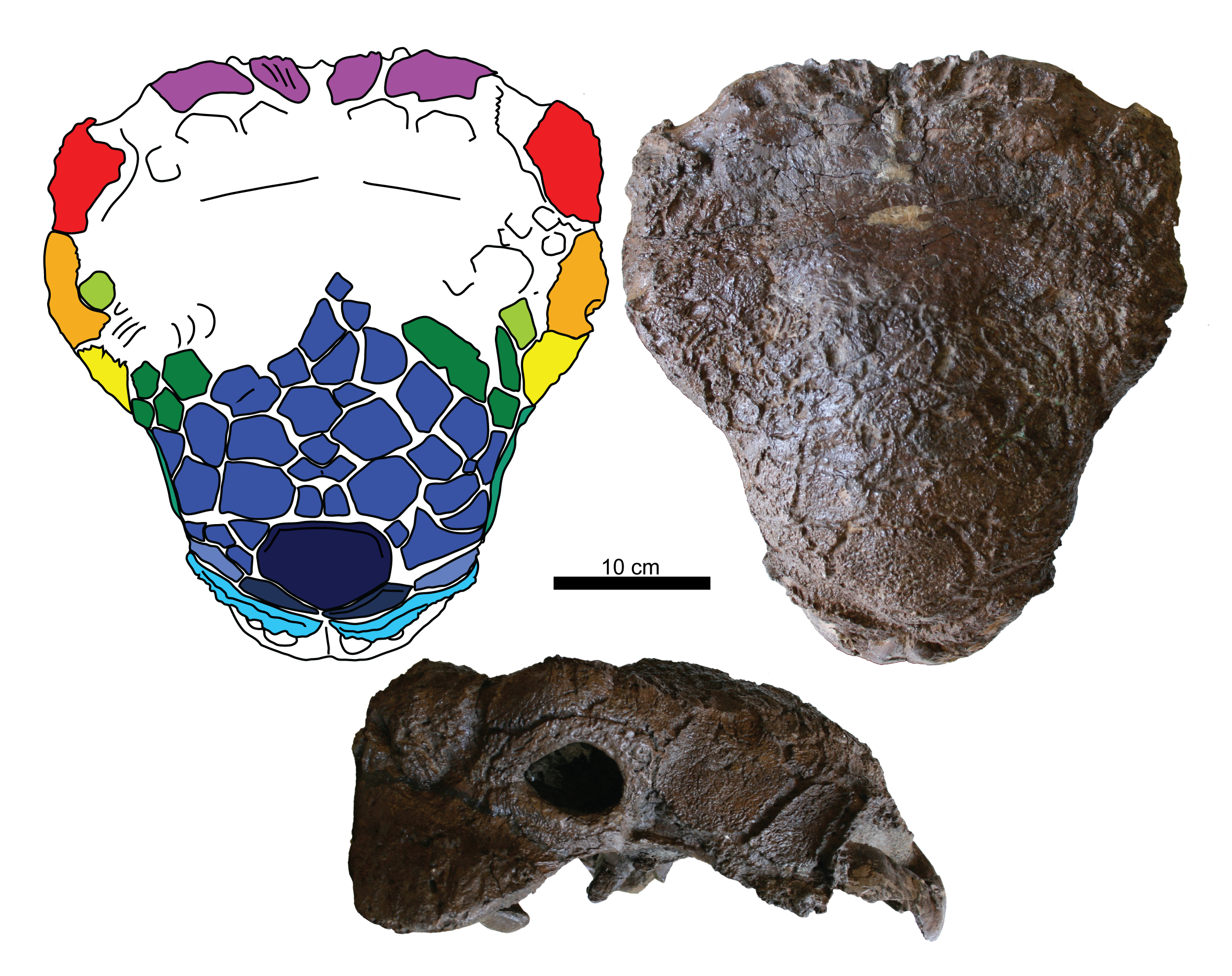
- Skull of holotype specimen AMNH 5337

Scientific classification
- Kingdom: Animalia
- Phylum: Chordata
- Class: Reptilia
- Clade: Dinosauria
- Clade: †Ornithischia
- Clade: †Thyreophora
- Clade: †Ankylosauria
- Family: †Ankylosauridae
- Subfamily: †Ankylosaurinae
- Tribe: †Ankylosaurini
- Genus: †Platypelta; Penkalski, 2018

Type species
- †Platypelta coombsi Penkalski, 2018

= Platypelta =

Platypelta Temporal range: Late Cretaceous, 77.5–76.5 Ma

Extinct genus of dinosaurs

Platypelta is an extinct genus of herbivorous ankylosaurid dinosaurs within the subfamily Ankylosaurinae. It is known from the Late Cretaceous Dinosaur Park Formation (early Late Campanian stage, about 77.5-76.5 Ma ago) of southern Alberta, Canada. The type species is Platypelta coombsi.

== Discovery and naming ==
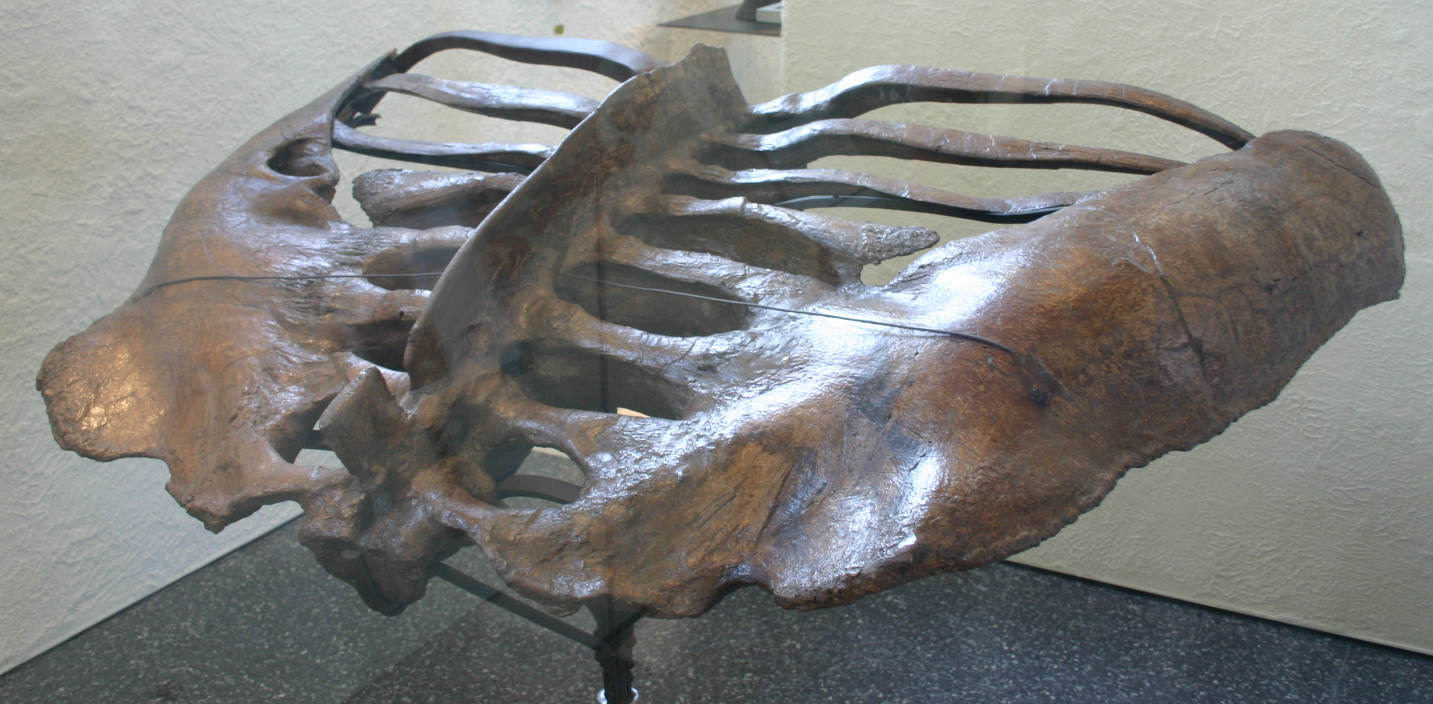
Pelvis of the holotype specimen

In 1914, Barnum Brown and Peter Kaisen, working for the American Museum of Natural History, in Alberta at the Sand Creek near the Red Deer River, eight miles southeast of Steveville, excavated an ankylosaur skeleton, specimen AMNH 5337. In 1971, it was referred to Euoplocephalus tutus by Walter Preston Coombs. In 2001 however, Paul Penkalski concluded that this skeleton was nearly identical to another exemplar, AMNH 5403, and that both likely represented a separate taxon. In 2013, Victoria Megan Arbour and Philip Currie continued to refer AMNH 5337 (and AMNH 5403) to Euoplocephalus, suggesting that differences from other skulls referred to Euoplocephalus could be due to changes occurring with growth and development. They also noted that AMNH 5337 differed from Scolosaurus and Dyoplosaurus in the pelvic region.

In 2018, Penkalski published a study containing a cladistic analyses of such forms. In it, AMNH 5337 and AMNH 5403 were recovered in a joint different position from Euoplocephalus tutus specimens CMN 210, UALVP 31, and AMNH 5406. He named a separate genus for AMNH 5337 and AMNH 5403: Platypelta, with as type species Platypelta coombsi. The generic name is derived from Greek platys, "wide", and plate, "small shield", in reference to the broad osteoderms. The specific name honors Walter P. Coombs Jr., who pioneered the study of ankylosaurs in the late twentieth century.

The holotype, AMNH 5337, was found in a layer of the Dinosaur Park Formation at an altitude of 667 metres, which indicates an age of about 76,8 million years. It consists of a skeleton with skull, lacking the tail and hindlimbs. It represents a mature and aged individual, in view of fused ribs, a fused shoulder girdle, rough articulation surfaces and rough armour.

Specimens AMNH 5403, CMN 8876, ROM 788, and ROM 813 were referred to Platypelta. AMNH 5403 consists of the severely compressed front half of a skeleton including the skull. A short tail club has been stored with this skeleton, but Penkalski doubted the connection, pointing out that the club was not marked nor mentioned in the accession catalogue. CMN 8876 is a skull preserving a single tooth. ROM 788 is a tail club. ROM 813 is a skeleton lacking the skull but containing the entire rump, forelimbs and hindlimbs. Apart from a large number of osteoderms, it preserves skin impressions. It has been secured on three blocks that have not been fully prepared to conserve the impressions. Penkalski already in 2001 suggested it represented a taxon different from Euoplocephalus.

== Description ==
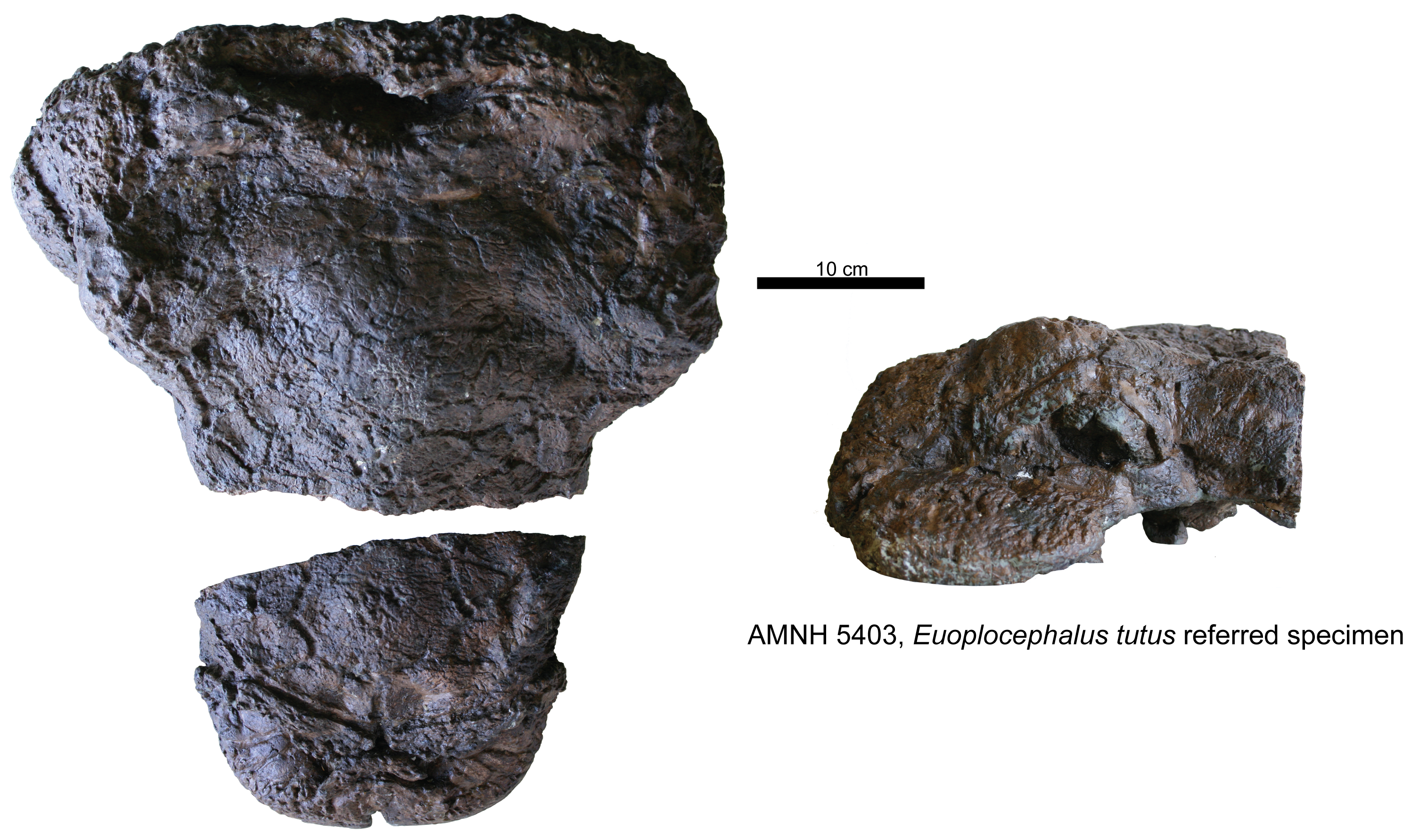
Referred skull AMNH 5403

Platypelta is a rather large ankylosaurid. In 2018, its length was estimated at six metres.

According to Penkalski, Platypelta is typified by a number of traits. Some of the armour plates on its rump are large, exceeding twenty-five centimetres in length, and have a rough top surface with a sharp keel continuing into a pointy beak-shape. The snout is constricted just in front of the eye sockets. The upper beak, of the snout, is rounded and relatively small. The vomers at their front side overlap the rear underside of the fused premaxillae. At the rear of the skull, the occipital condyle is large. The squamosal horns, at the rear corners of the skull roof, are low and rough with a broad base and a pitted point extending to behind. The tooth crowns are strongly ornamented. In the lower arm, the ulna is long and lightly built. In the pelvis, the front blade of the ilium only lightly bends to below. The foot is robust with arched claws. On the first cervical halfring, the transverse armour band protecting the top front of the neck, the paired middle osteoderms are elongated and partly keeled with a conical projection. On the first cervical halfring, the lateral, or side, osteoderms have a bent but not wavy keel of which the point sticks out to the rear.

== Phylogeny ==
Platypelta was in 2018 placed, within the Ankylosauridae, in the Ankylosaurinae. More precisely, it was a member of the clade Euoplocephalini, established by Penkalski, which is an approximate synonym of Ankylosaurini in several studies. In the evolutionary tree it was placed above Scolosaurus and below Dyoplosaurus.

== See also ==
- Timeline of ankylosaur research
- 2018 in paleontology
