= Hensonbatrachus =

Hensonbatrachus Temporal range: mid-late Campanian

Scientific classification
- Kingdom: Animalia
- Phylum: Chordata
- Class: Amphibia
- Order: Anura
- Genus: †Hensonbatrachus
- Species: †H. kermiti

Binomial name
- †Hensonbatrachus kermiti Gardner & Brinkman, 2015

Extinct genus of frogs

Hensonbatrachus is an extinct genus of frog that lived during the Campanian stage of the Late Cretaceous epoch of western North America. It contains a single species, H. kermiti. The genus is named after Muppets creator Jim Henson, with the species being named after his most famous character, Kermit the Frog.

== Distribution ==
Fossils of Hensonbatrachus kermiti are known from Campanian-aged freshwater deposits in western North America, in both Canada and the United States. The first fossils were described from the Dinosaur Park Formation and Oldman Formation of Alberta, Canada. In 2016, more remains were also described from the Judith River Formation of Montana, US. Indeterminate remains of a similar frog are also known from the Horseshoe Canyon Formation of Alberta, Canada.
