= Tyrrellbatrachus =

Tyrrellbatrachus Temporal range: Campanian

Scientific classification
- Kingdom: Animalia
- Phylum: Chordata
- Class: Amphibia
- Order: Anura
- Genus: †Tyrrellbatrachus
- Species: †T. brinkmani

Binomial name
- †Tyrrellbatrachus brinkmani Gardner, 2015

Extinct genus of frogs

Tyrrellbatrachus is an extinct genus of anuran that lived during the Campanian stage of the Late Cretaceous epoch.

== Distribution ==
Tyrrellbatrachus brinkmani is known from fossils found in the Dinosaur Park Formation of Alberta, Canada.
