= Lisserpeton =

Lisserpeton Temporal range: Maastrichtian-Lancian ~70–65 Ma

Scientific classification
- Kingdom: Animalia
- Phylum: Chordata
- Class: Amphibia
- Order: Urodela
- Family: †Scapherpetontidae
- Genus: †Lisserpeton; Estes, 1965

Extinct genus of salamanders

Lisserpeton is an extinct genus of prehistoric salamander of the Hell Creek Formation. Its closest living relatives are the mole salamanders.

== Distribution ==
Fossils of Lisserpeton have been found in

- Hell Creek Formation, Williston Basin
- Laramie Formation, Colorado
- Kaiparowits Formation, Utah
- Lance Formation, Wyoming

Canada

- Dinosaur Park Formation, Alberta
- Ravenscrag Formation, Saskatchewan

Mexico

- Cerro del Pueblo Formation

== See also ==
- Prehistoric amphibian
- List of prehistoric amphibians
