= Lexicon of Canadian Geologic Units =

Public Canadian government database of geologic units & names

The Lexicon of Canadian Geologic Units, also called the Lexicon of Canadian Geological Names or simply the Lexicon, is an online database provided by the Government of Canada. It includes the names of more than 16,000 geologic units throughout Canada, as well as information about each geologic unit from several sources. The names of these geologic units may be formal, informal or undefined; they may also be obsolete or currently in use.

The Lexicon of Canadian Geologic Units includes both lithological units and chronological units, the latter of which may be searched only by age or name. In addition to age and name, geologic units in the Lexicon may also be searched by first citation, by source data set or by province or territory.
