= Socognathus =

Socognathus Temporal range: Middle Campanian to late Maastrichtian

Scientific classification
- Domain: Eukaryota
- Kingdom: Animalia
- Phylum: Chordata
- Class: Reptilia
- Order: Squamata
- Genus: †Socognathus; Gao & Fox 1991
- Species: †S. unicuspis

Binomial name
- †Socognathus unicuspis Gao & Fox 1991

Extinct genus of lizards

Socognathus is a genus of prehistoric chamopsiid polyglyphanodontian lizards containing species that lived from the Middle Campanian stage to the late Maastrichtian. Several specimens of the type species, Socognathus unicuspis, have been found in Alberta, Canada. A second species, Socognathus brachyodon is known from the late Maastrichtian Lance Formation; its fossils have been found in Wyoming, United States.
