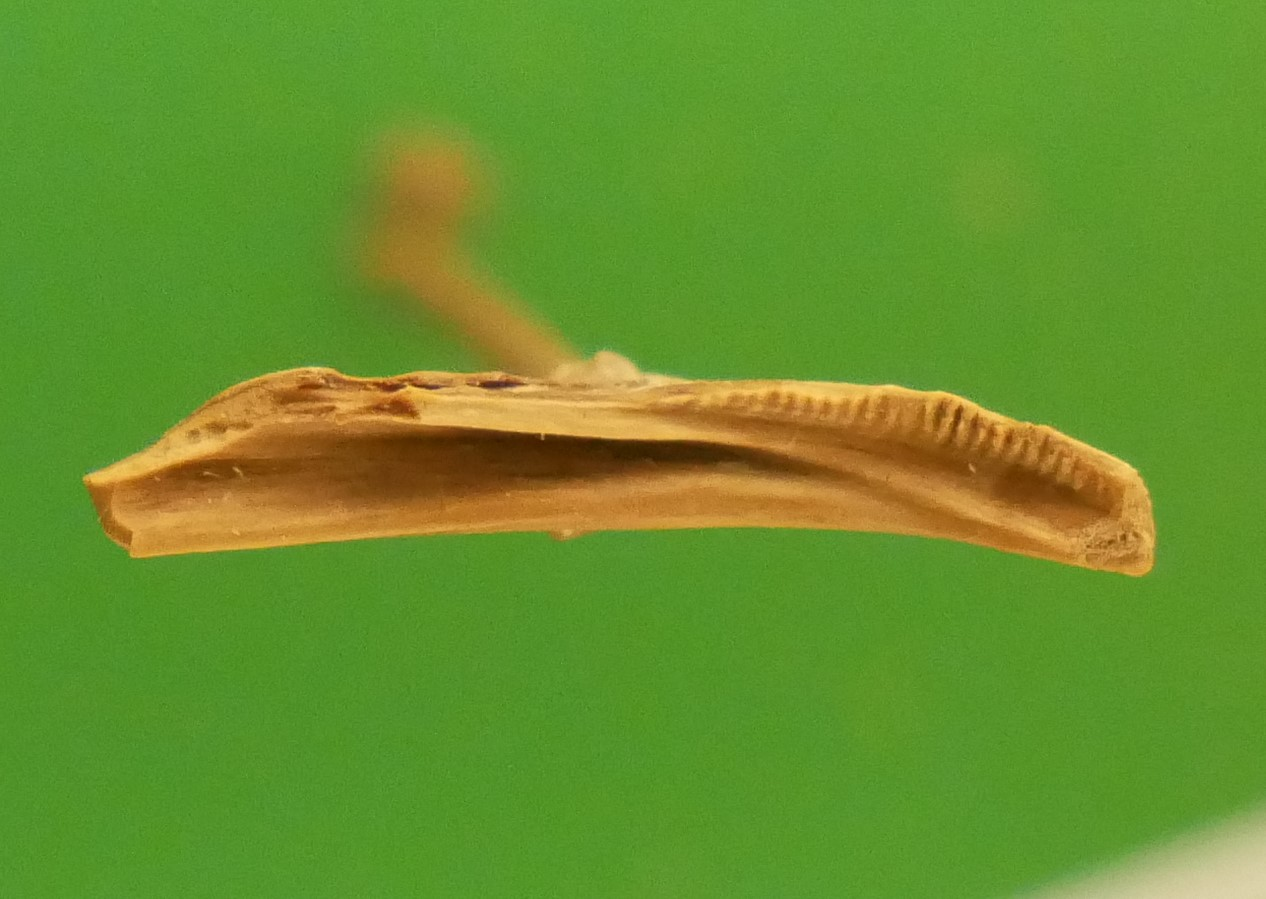
- Scapherpeton tectum jaw

Scientific classification
- Kingdom: Animalia
- Phylum: Chordata
- Class: Amphibia
- Order: Urodela
- Family: †Scapherpetontidae
- Genus: †Scapherpeton; Cope, 1876

= Scapherpeton =

Scapherpeton Temporal range: 68–66 Ma

Extinct genus of amphibians

Scapherpeton is an extinct genus of prehistoric amphibian. Fossils of it have been found in the Hell Creek Formation.

== See also ==
- Prehistoric amphibian
- List of prehistoric amphibians
