= Lioplacodes =

Lioplacodes Temporal range: Jurassic–Paleocene

Scientific classification
- Kingdom: Animalia
- Phylum: Mollusca
- Class: Gastropoda
- Subclass: Caenogastropoda
- Order: Architaenioglossa
- Family: Viviparidae
- Genus: †Lioplacodes; Meek, 1864

Type species
- Melania veterna

Genus of gastropods

Lioplacodes is an extinct genus of freshwater snail of the family Viviparidae. It lived from the Jurassic to Paleocene of Canada, the United States, and China.

== Species ==
Species within Lioplacodes include:

- Lioplacodes veternus Meek & Hayden, 1861
- Lioplacodes bituminus Russell, 1932
- Lioplacodes bolivianus Parodiz, 1969
- Lioplacodes canaliculatus Yen, 1951
- Lioplacodes cholnokyi (Schlosser, 1906)
- Lioplacodes conoides Yu, 1982
- Lioplacodes convexiculus Yen, 1946
- Lioplacodes cretaceus (Stanton, 1899)
- Lioplacodes endlichi (White, 1878)
- Lioplacodes fallax Yu, 1982
- Lioplacodes feruglioi Parodiz, 1969
- Lioplacodes gansuensis Pan, 1982
- Lioplacodes jiangsuensis Gu, 1989
- Lioplacodes judithensis (Stanton & Hatcher, 1905)
- Lioplacodes jurassicus Yen, 1952
- Lioplacodes lacerdae (Hartt, 1870)
- Lioplacodes laevigatus Yu, 1987
- Lioplacodes lijiagouensis Yu, 1987
- Lioplacodes limneaformis (Meek & Hayden, 1856)
- Lioplacodes mariana Yen, 1946
- Lioplacodes multistriata (Meek & Hayden, 1856)
- Lioplacodes nebrascensis (Meek & Hayden, 1856)
- Lioplacodes orientalis Yü, 1974
- Lioplacodes praecursa (Dyer, 1930)
- Lioplacodes sanctamariensis (Russell, 1932)
- Lioplacodes shouchangensis Pan, 1980
- Lioplacodes sinensis Yen, 1969
- Lioplacodes sorgenfreii Yen, 1958
- Lioplacodes stachei (White, 1895)
- Lioplacodes stenotes Pan, 1980
- Lioplacodes tenuicarinata (Meek & Hayden, 1857)
- Lioplacodes tenuis (Warren, 1926)
- Lioplacodes veternus (Meek & Hayden, 1861)
- Lioplacodes wealdensis Yen, 1966
- Lioplacodes whiteavesi (Russell, 1929)
- Lioplacodes wichmanni (Doello-Jurado, 1922)
- Lioplacodes williamsi (Hartt, 1870)
- Lioplacodes xishanensis Shan, 1994
- Lioplacodes yixianensis Yu, 1987
- Lioplacodes yunnanensis Yu & Xi, 1977
