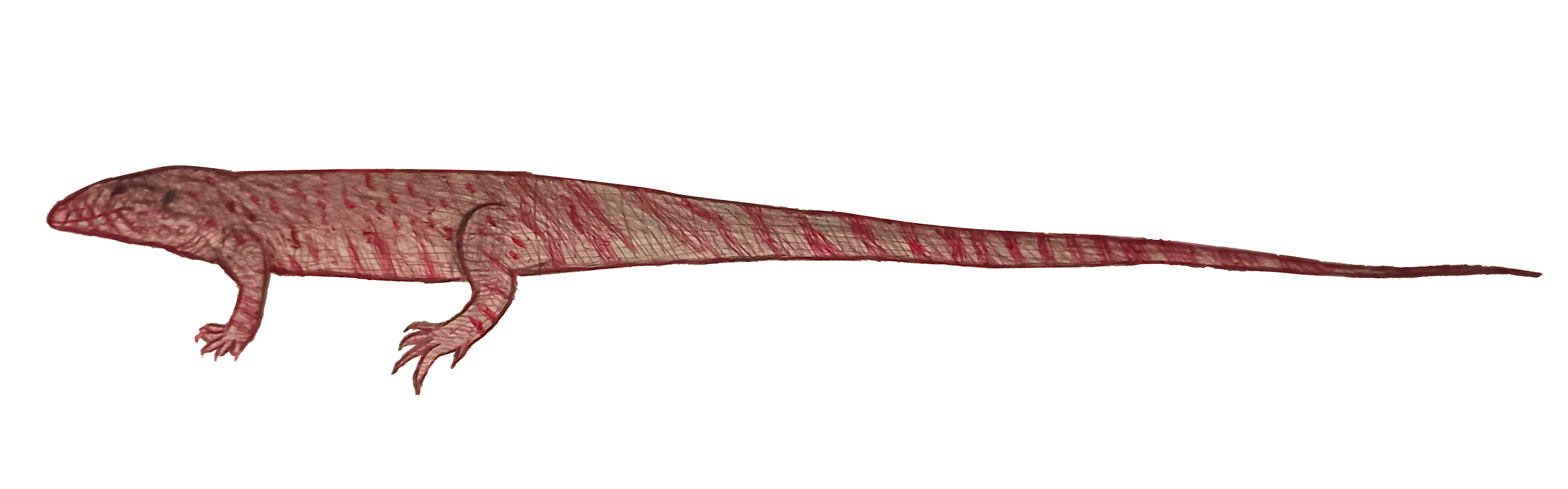
- Paleoart based on available fossil evidence

Scientific classification
- Kingdom: Animalia
- Phylum: Chordata
- Class: Reptilia
- Order: Squamata
- Clade: †Polyglyphanodontia
- Family: †Chamopsiidae
- Genus: †Glyptogenys; Gao & Fox, 1991
- Species: †G. ornata

Binomial name
- †Glyptogenys ornata Gao & Fox, 1991

= Glyptogenys =

Glyptogenys Temporal range: 84.9–70.6 Ma

Extinct genus of reptiles

Glyptogenys is an extinct genus of polyglyphanodontian lizard described by Gao Keqin and Richard Fox in 1991. It is known from one species, Glyptogenys ornata, which lived in the Cretaceous of Canada.

== Description ==
Glyptogenys is described as being a "relatively large" teiid compared to the other lizards in its formation. Glyptogenys ornata had a deep and robust dentary with strong ornamentation below the inferior alveolar foramina, particularly in adults. The subdental shelf was unusually deep compared with those of other primitive teiids. The mandibular symphysis was relatively weak compared to the robustness of the other parts and lacked a strong ventral buttress. Its teeth were heterodont and closely spaced, forming a comb-like arrangement. The anterior teeth were unicuspid, while the posterior teeth were bicuspid, with the main cusp positioned toward the rear and a smaller but distinct anterior cusp. The tooth bases were strongly widened and surrounded by thick deposits of cementum, while the teeth were attached to the jaw in a subpleurodont arrangement. Those characteristics in the dentary of glyptogenys differs It from modern teiid lizards.

== Ecology ==
The dentary of Glyptogenys is distinguished specially by exceptionally strong lateral ornamentation, a feature considered taxonomically important because comparable sculpture is uncommon among living teiids. Generally, larger individuals show more extensive ornamentation than smaller ones, while the cuspation of the dentary teeth also appears to become more pronounced. This could suggest that mandibular ornamentation increased with age. Ontogenetic variation in mandibular osteodermal sculpture has been documented in lizards, with several studies reporting increased development of jaw sculpture through growth in Anolis and iguanids. However, Glyptogenys may represent a different case. The holotype was probably a mature but not particularly old individual, as indicated by its unworn tooth crowns, yet it already shows extensive mandibular ornamentation. Furthermore, two small, unnumbered jaw fragments also exhibit heavy sculpture and ornamentation, whereas the much larger specimen UALVP 29756, which may represent a large and old male, has comparatively less pronounced ones. The ornamentation in this lizard was suggested to be sexual dimorphism, where males would have more exaggerated jaw ornamentation compared to females. However, it was considered a problematic theory because of the fragmentary nature and small sample size. Although slight mandibular ornamentation occurs in some extant genera such as Ameiva and Cnemidophorus, it is considerably less developed. Unlike these genera, which possess slender jaws and pointed teeth associated with feeding on soft-bodied insects, Glyptogenys had a deep, robust dentary with thick, blunt bicuspid teeth. This morphology has been interpreted as an adaptation for crushing hard-shelled beetles and other resistant terrestrial invertebrates, resulting in a more compact, shorter snout and jaw compared to many modern Teiids.

== Etymology ==
Glyptogenys means "carved jaw", with "glypto" meaning carved, and "genys" meaning jaw. "Ornata" means ornamented, referencing the sculpture on the external surface of the holotype.

== Specimens and geographic range ==
Its type specimen is UALVP 29735, which is a mandible bearing 12 well-preserved teeth

Although there are several other uncatalogued specimens in the UALVP collection which have a jaw configuration that resembles UALVP 29735, when describing Glyptogenys ornata Gao and Fox considered the other specimens to be too fragmentary to be confidently assigned to Glyptogenys ornata and left UALVP 29735 as the only known specimen.

In 1996, Gao and Fox also assigned UALVP 2036, UALVP 29756, UALVP 29758, UALVP 29759, UALVP 29913, UALVP 29767. and UALVP 29769. All specimens are tooth-bearing dentaries with the exception of UALVP 29758. They also found unnumbered dentary fragments from the Milk River Formation to possibly represent Glyptogenys ornata although support from better preserved specimens is needed.

The fossil was found near Medicine Hat in Alberta, Canada. Another fossil was found near Dinosaur Provincial Park.
