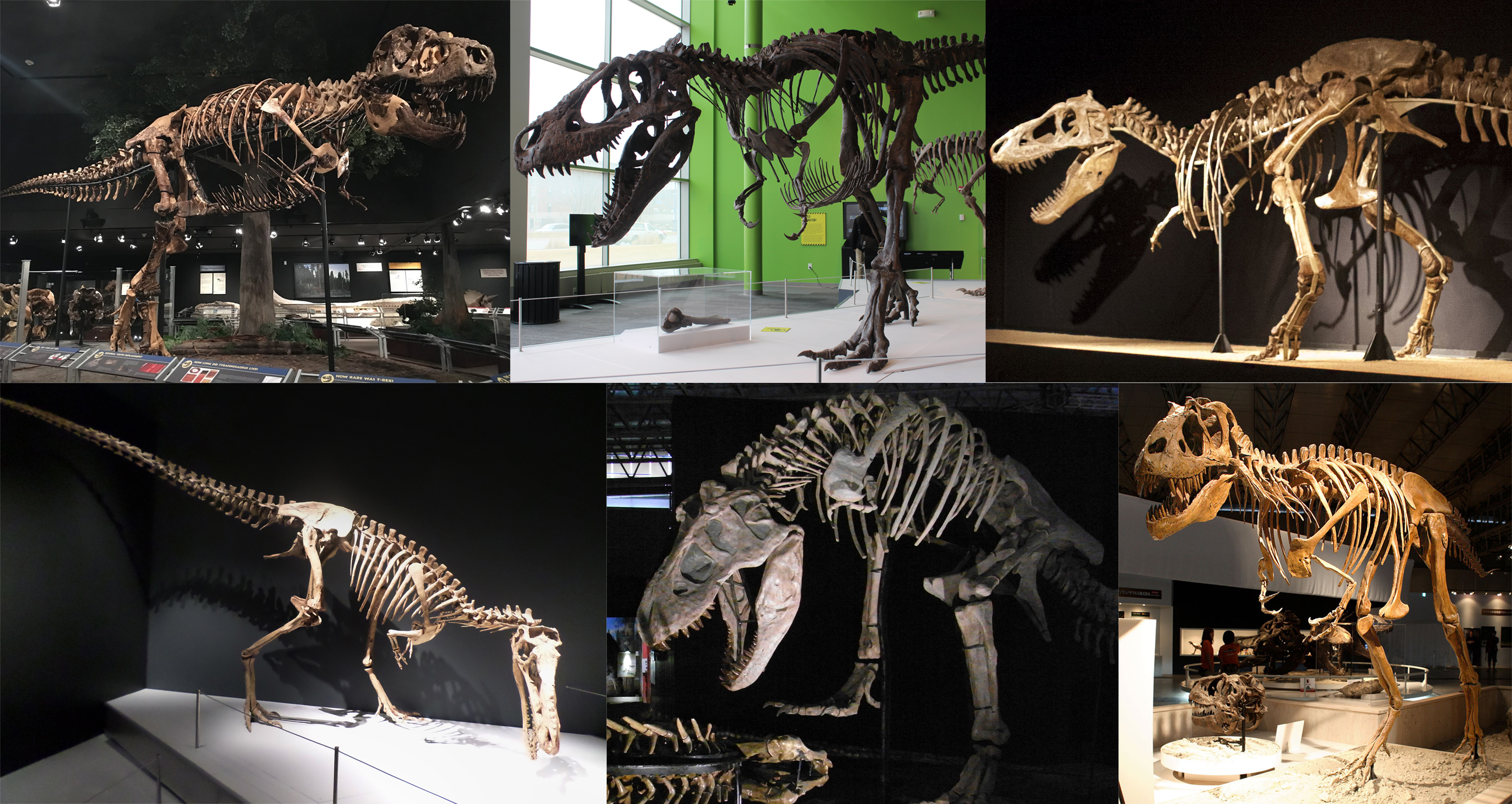
- Montage of six tyrannosaurids, clockwise from top left: Tyrannosaurus, Daspletosaurus, Tarbosaurus, Gorgosaurus, Zhuchengtyrannus, and Alioramus

Scientific classification
- Kingdom: Animalia
- Phylum: Chordata
- Class: Reptilia
- Clade: Dinosauria
- Clade: Saurischia
- Clade: Theropoda
- Superfamily: †Tyrannosauroidea
- Clade: †Pantyrannosauria
- Clade: †Eutyrannosauria
- Family: †Tyrannosauridae; Osborn, 1906

Type genus
- †Tyrannosaurus Osborn, 1905

Subgroups
- †Aublysodon; †Deinodon; †Raptorex; †Albertosaurinae; †Tyrannosaurinae

Synonyms
- Deinodontidae Cope, 1866; Aublysodontidae Nopcsa, 1928; Shanshanosauridae Dong, 1977

= Tyrannosauridae =

Tyrannosaurids Temporal range: Late Cretaceous, 83–66 Ma

Family of dinosaurs

Tyrannosauridae (or tyrannosaurids, meaning "tyrant lizards") is a family of coelurosaurian dinosaurs that comprises two subfamilies containing up to fifteen genera, including the eponymous Tyrannosaurus. The exact number of genera is controversial, with some experts recognizing as few as three. All of these animals lived near the end of the Cretaceous period and their fossils have been found only in North America and Asia. Well-known genera include Tyrannosaurus, Albertosaurus, Gorgosaurus, Daspletosaurus, Tarbosaurus, and Dynamoterror.

Although descended from smaller ancestors, tyrannosaurids were almost always the largest predators in their respective ecosystems, putting them at the apex of the food chain. The largest species was Tyrannosaurus rex, one of the most massive known terrestrial predators of all time, which measured over 13 metres (43 ft) in length and according to most modern estimates up to 8.87 metric tons (9.78 short tons) in weight. Tyrannosaurids were bipedal carnivores with massive skulls filled with large teeth. Despite their large size, their legs were (outside of adults of the largest taxa) relatively long and cursorial for swift movement. In contrast, their arms were very small, bearing only two functional digits.

Unlike most other groups of dinosaurs, very complete remains have been discovered for most known tyrannosaurids. This has allowed a variety of research into their biology. Scientific studies have focused on their ontogeny, biomechanics and ecology, among other subjects.

== History of discovery ==
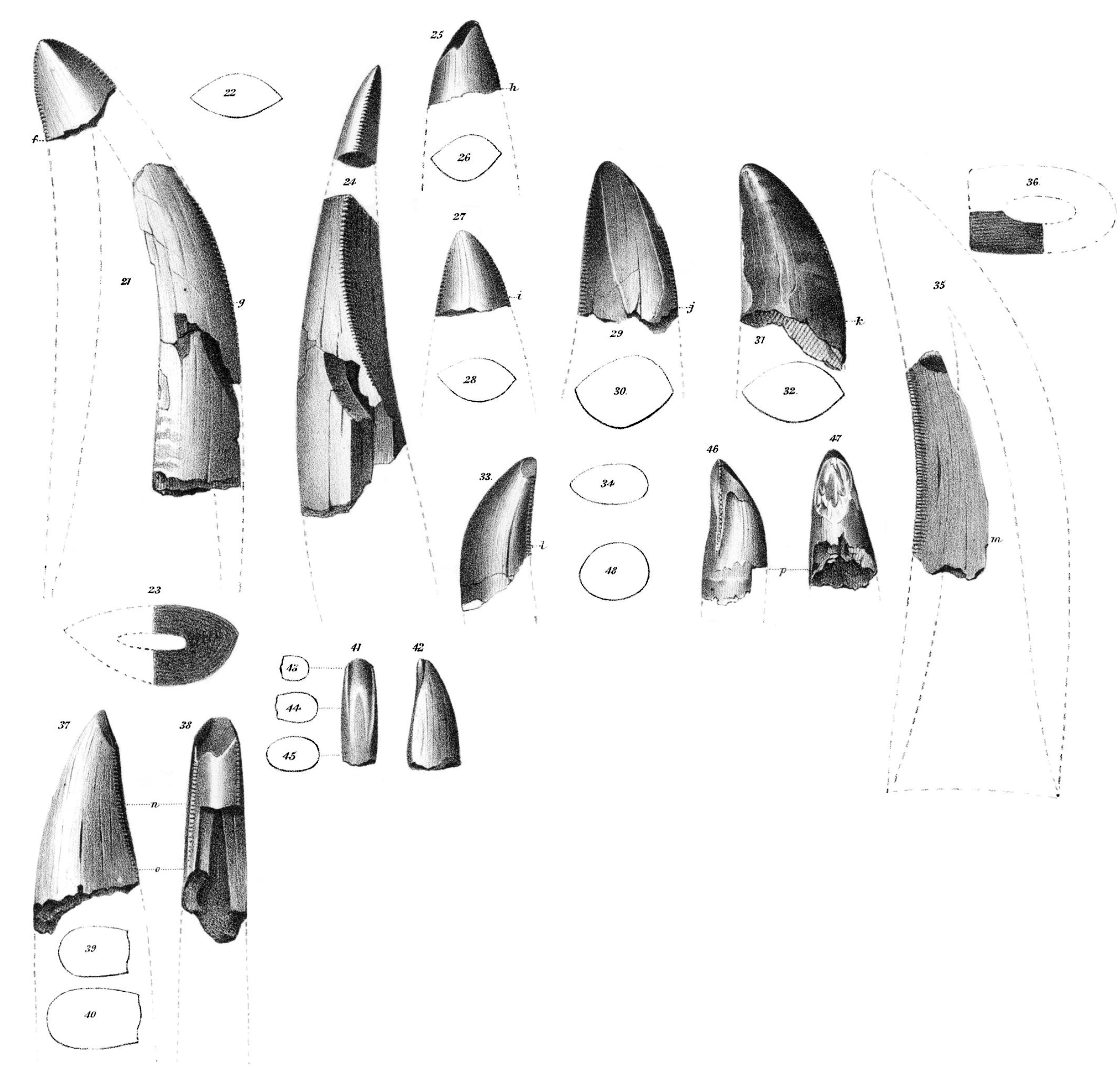
Deinodon teeth, the earliest known tyrannosaurid remains

The first remains of tyrannosaurids were uncovered during expeditions led by the Geological Survey of Canada, which located numerous scattered teeth. These distinctive dinosaur teeth were given the name Deinodon ("terrible tooth") by Joseph Leidy in 1856. The first good specimens of a tyrannosaurid were found in the Horseshoe Canyon Formation of Alberta, and consisted of nearly complete skulls with partial skeletons. These remains were first studied by Edward Drinker Cope in 1876, who considered them a species of the eastern tyrannosauroid Dryptosaurus. In 1905, Henry Fairfield Osborn recognized that the Alberta remains differed considerably from Dryptosaurus, and coined a new name for them: Albertosaurus sarcophagus ("flesh-eating Alberta lizard"). Cope described more tyrannosaur material in 1892, in the form of isolated vertebrae, and gave this animal the name Manospondylus gigas. This discovery was mostly overlooked for over a century, and caused controversy in the early 2000s when it was discovered that this material actually belonged to, and had name priority over, Tyrannosaurus rex.

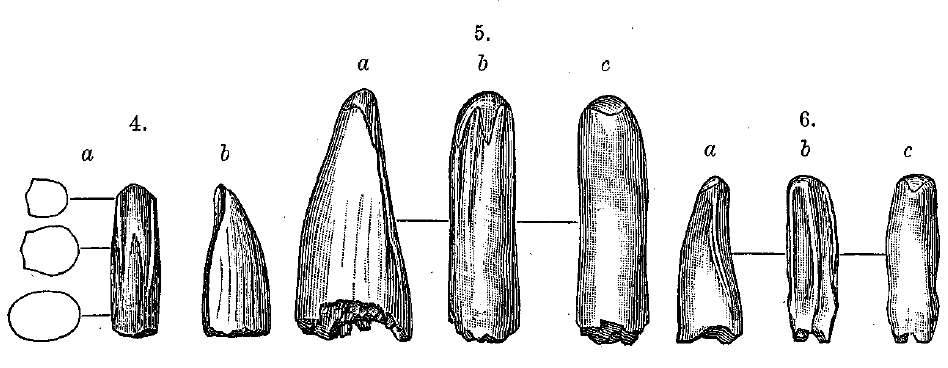
Teeth that have been assigned to Aublysodon at various times

In his 1905 paper naming Albertosaurus, Osborn described two additional tyrannosaur specimens that had been collected in Montana and Wyoming during a 1902 expedition of the American Museum of Natural History, led by Barnum Brown. Initially, Osborn considered these to be distinct species. The first, he named Dynamosaurus imperiosus ("emperor power lizard"), and the second, Tyrannosaurus rex ("king tyrant lizard"). A year later, Osborn recognized that these two specimens actually came from the same species. Despite the fact that Dynamosaurus had been found first, the name Tyrannosaurus had appeared one page earlier in his original article describing both specimens. Therefore, according to the International Code of Zoological Nomenclature (ICZN), the name Tyrannosaurus was used.

Barnum Brown went on to collect several more tyrannosaurid specimens from Alberta, including the first to preserve the shortened, two-fingered forelimbs characteristic of the group (which Lawrence Lambe named Gorgosaurus libratus, "balanced fierce lizard", in 1914). A second significant find attributed to Gorgosaurus was made in 1942, in the form of a well-preserved, though unusually small, complete skull. The specimen waited until after the end of World War II to be studied by Charles W. Gilmore, who named it Gorgosaurus lancesnis. This skull was re-studied by Robert T. Bakker, Phil Currie, and Michael Williams in 1988, and assigned to the new genus Nanotyrannus. It was also in 1946 that paleontologists from the Soviet Union began expeditions into Mongolia, and uncovered the first tyrannosaur remains from Asia. Evgeny Maleev described new Mongolian species of Tyrannosaurus and Gorgosaurus in 1955, and one new genus: Tarbosaurus ("terrifying lizard"). Subsequent studies, however, showed that all of Maleev's tyrannosaur species were actually one species of Tarbosaurus at different stages of growth. A second species of Mongolian tyrannosaurid was found later, described by Sergei Kurzanov in 1976, and given the name Alioramus remotus ("remote different branch"), though its status as a true tyrannosaurid and not a more primitive tyrannosaur is still controversial.

== Description ==
Size comparison of large tyrannosaurid genera Tyrannosaurus, Tarbosaurus, Albertosaurus, Gorgosaurus and Daspletosaurus

The tyrannosaurids were all large animals, with all species capable of weighing at least 1 metric ton. A single specimen of Alioramus of an individual estimated at between 5 and 6 metres (16 and 20 ft) long has been discovered, although it is considered by some experts to be a juvenile. Albertosaurus, Gorgosaurus and Daspletosaurus all measured between 8 and 9 metres (26 and 30 ft) long, while Tarbosaurus reached lengths of 11 metres (36 ft) from snout to tail. The massive Tyrannosaurus reached 13 metres (43 ft) in the largest specimen, RSM P2523.8. Tyrannosaurids are united by numerous synapomorphies, including an interfenestral strut that is less than half the rostrocaudal length of the maxillary fenestra, a lacrimal horn with a distinct apex in lateral view, and a pronounced lateral ridge on the postorbital ramus of the jugal that braces its articulation with the postorbital, among many other derived features.

=== Skull and dentition ===
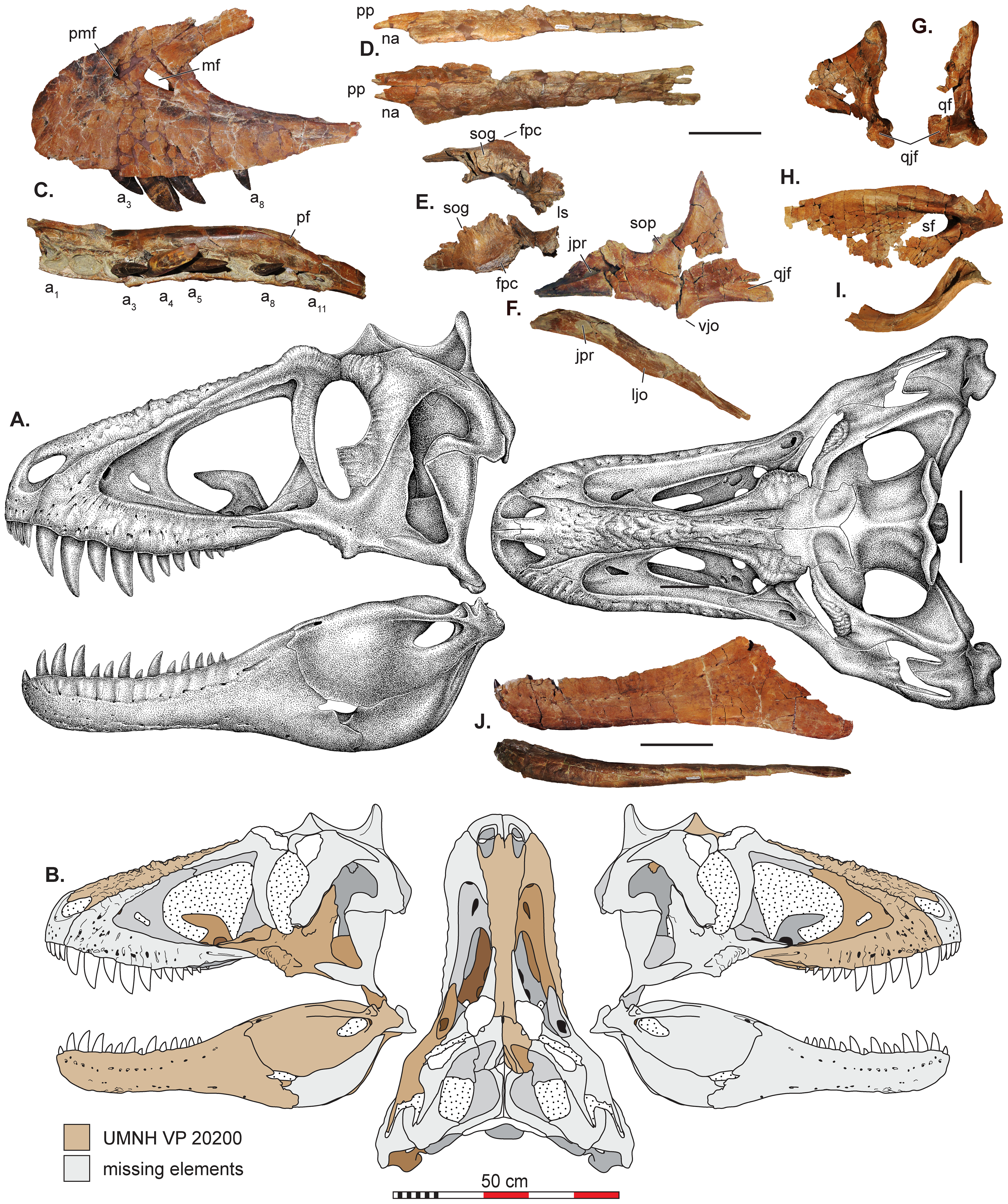
Labelled Lythronax skull

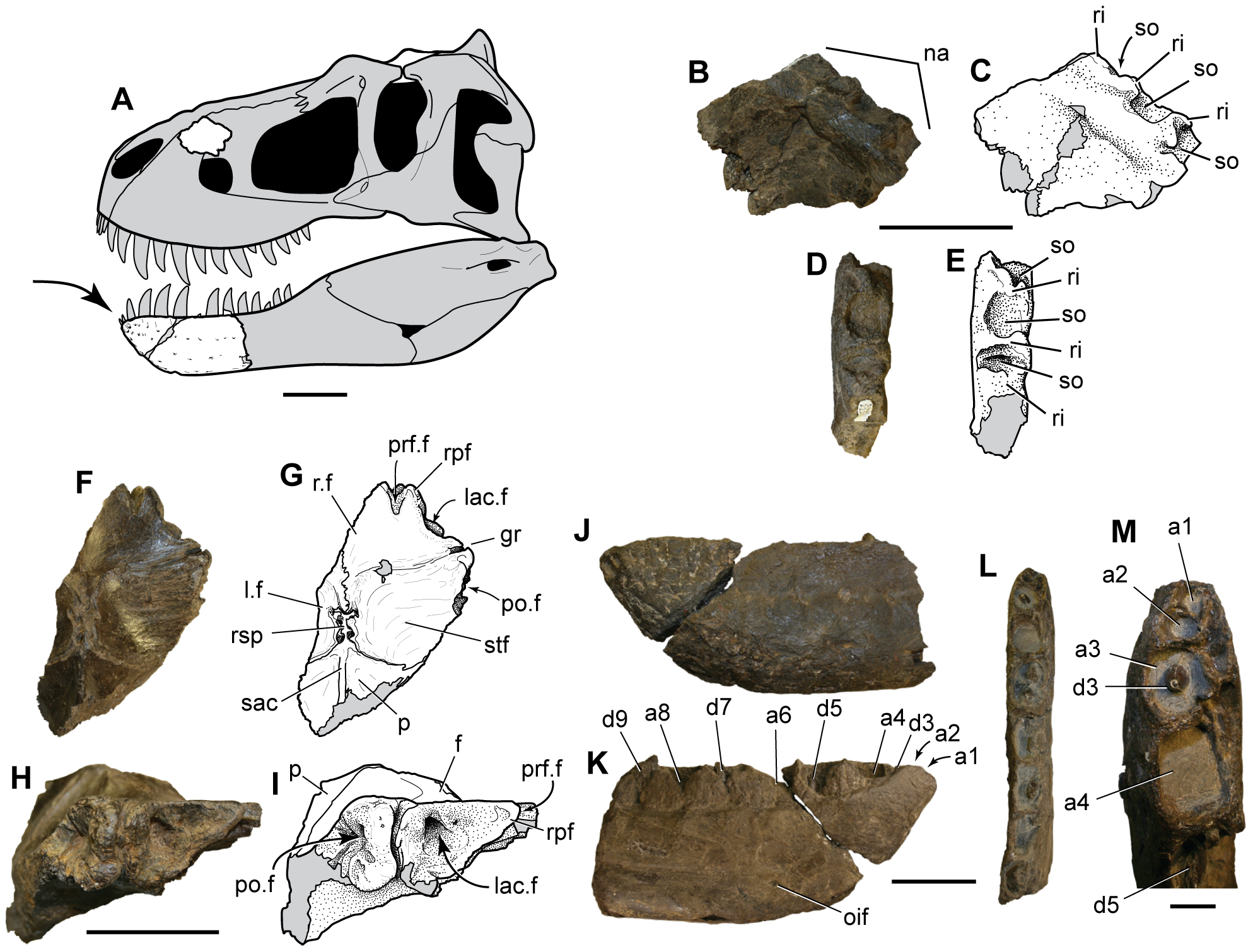
Labelled Nanuqsaurus skull

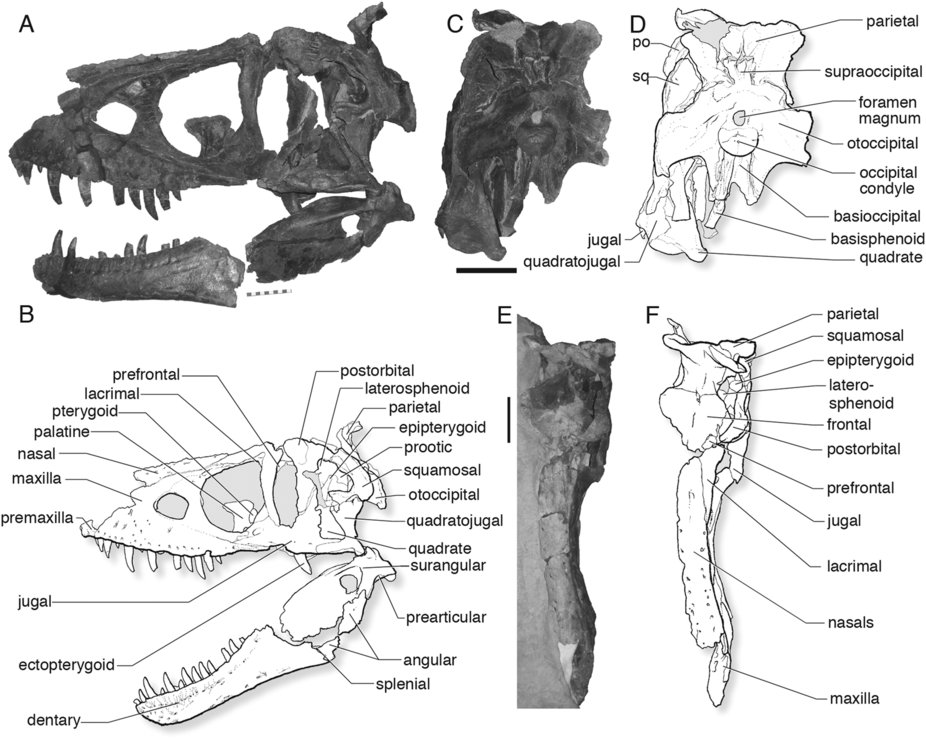
Labelled Daspletosaurus skull

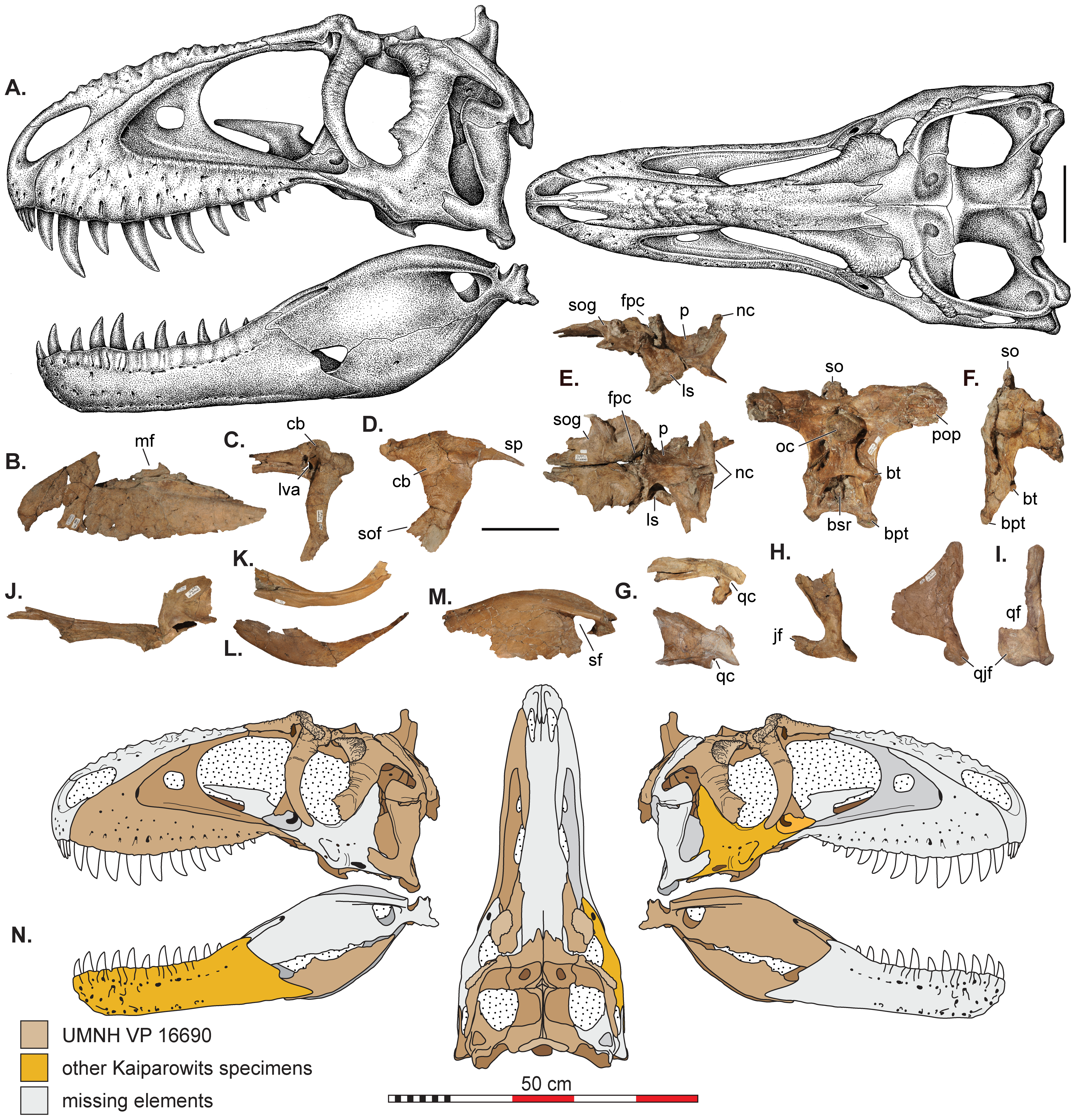
Labelled Teratophoneus skull

Tyrannosaurid skull anatomy is well understood, as complete skulls are known for all genera but Alioramus, which is known only from partial skull remains. Tyrannosaurus, Tarbosaurus, and Daspletosaurus had skulls that exceeded 1 m (3.3 ft) in length. Adult tyrannosaurids had tall, massive skulls, with many bones fused and reinforced for strength. At the same time, hollow chambers within many skull bones and large openings (fenestrae) between those bones helped to reduce skull weight. Many features of tyrannosaurid skulls were also found in their immediate ancestors, including tall premaxillae and fused nasal bones.

Tyrannosaurid skulls had many unique characteristics, including fused parietal bones with a prominent sagittal crest, which ran longitudinally along the sagittal suture and separated the two supratemporal fenestrae on the skull roof. Behind these fenestrae, tyrannosaurids had a characteristically tall nuchal crest, which also arose from the parietals but ran along a transverse plane rather than longitudinally. The nuchal crest was especially well-developed in Tyrannosaurus, Tarbosaurus and Alioramus. Albertosaurus, Daspletosaurus and Gorgosaurus had tall crests in front of the eyes on the lacrimal bones, while Tarbosaurus and Tyrannosaurus had extremely thickened postorbital bones forming crescent-shaped crests behind the eyes. Alioramus had a row of six bony crests on top of its snout, arising from the nasal bones; lower crests have been reported on some specimens of Daspletosaurus and Tarbosaurus, as well as the more basal tyrannosauroid Appalachiosaurus. The snout and other parts of the skull also sported numerous foramina. According to the 2017 study which described D. horneri, scaly integument as well as tactile sensitivity was correlated with the multiple rows of neurovascular foramina seen in crocodilians and tyrannosaurids.

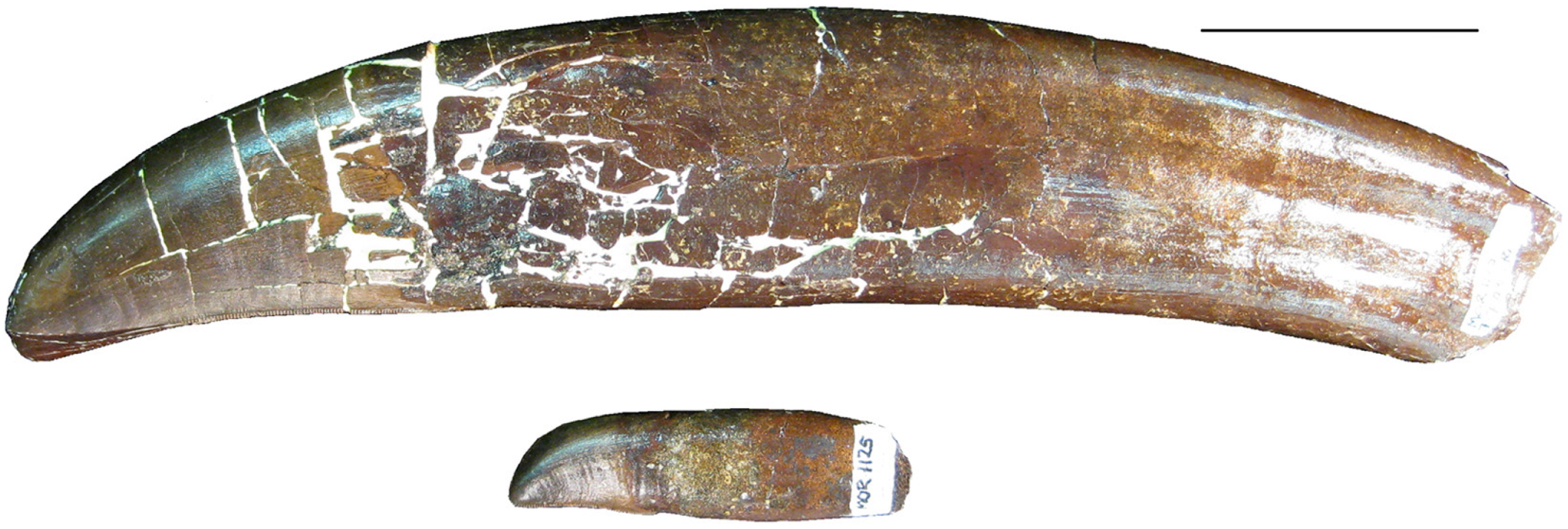
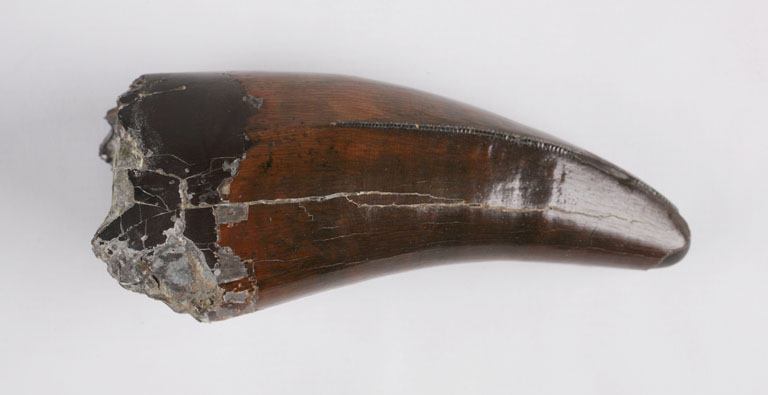
Tyrannosaurus teeth

Tyrannosaurids, like their tyrannosauroid ancestors, were heterodonts, with premaxillary teeth D-shaped in cross section and smaller than the rest. Unlike earlier tyrannosauroids and most other theropods, the maxillary and mandibular teeth of mature tyrannosaurids are not blade-like but extremely thickened and often circular in cross-section, with some species having reduced serrations. Tooth counts tend to be consistent within species, and larger species tend to have lower tooth counts than smaller ones. For example, Alioramus had 76 to 78 teeth in its jaws, while Tyrannosaurus had between 54 and 60.

William Abler observed in 2001 that Albertosaurus tooth serrations resemble a crack in the tooth ending in a round void called an ampulla. Tyrannosaurid teeth were used as holdfasts for pulling meat off a body, so when a tyrannosaur would have pulled back on a piece of meat, the tension could cause a purely crack-like serration to spread through the tooth. However, the presence of the ampulla would have distributed these forces over a larger surface area, and lessened the risk of damage to the tooth under strain. The presence of incisions ending in voids has parallels in human engineering. Guitar makers use incisions ending in voids to, as Abler describes, "impart alternating regions of flexibility and rigidity" to the wood they work with. The use of a drill to create an "ampulla" of sorts and prevent the propagation of cracks through material is also used to protect airplane surfaces. Abler demonstrated that a plexiglass bar with incisions called "kerfs" and drilled holes was more than 25% stronger than one with only regularly placed incisions. Unlike tyrannosaurs and other theropods, ancient predators like phytosaurs and Dimetrodon had no adaptations to prevent the crack-like serrations of their teeth from spreading when subjected to the forces of feeding.

=== Postcranial skeleton ===
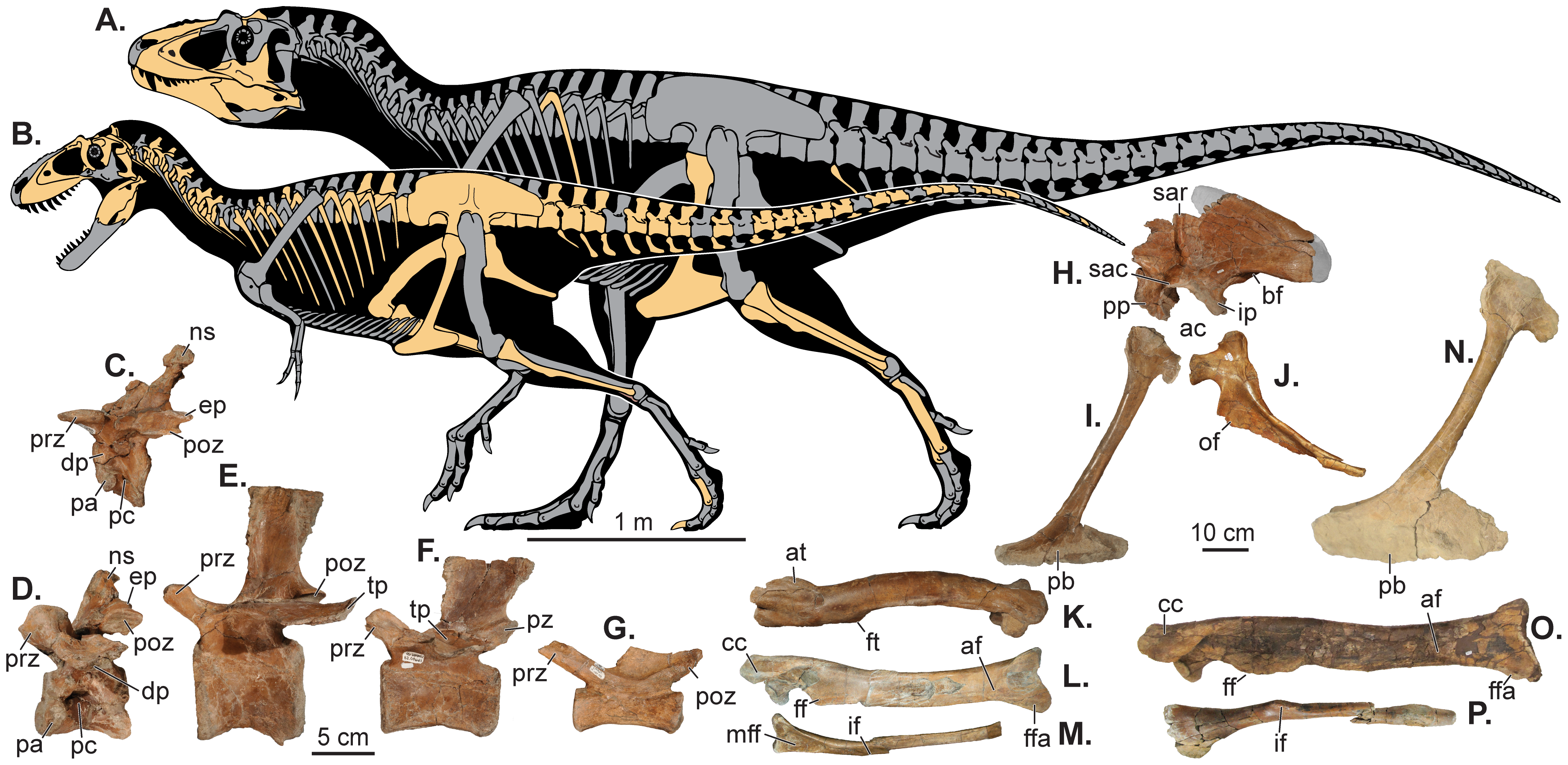
Skeletal diagrams of Lythronax and Teratophoneus

The skull was perched at the end of a thick, S-shaped neck, and a long, heavy tail acted as a counterweight to balance out the head and torso, with the center of mass over the hips. Tyrannosaurids are known for their proportionately very small two-fingered forelimbs, although remnants of a vestigial third digit are sometimes found. Tarbosaurus had the shortest forelimbs compared to its body size, while Daspletosaurus had the longest.

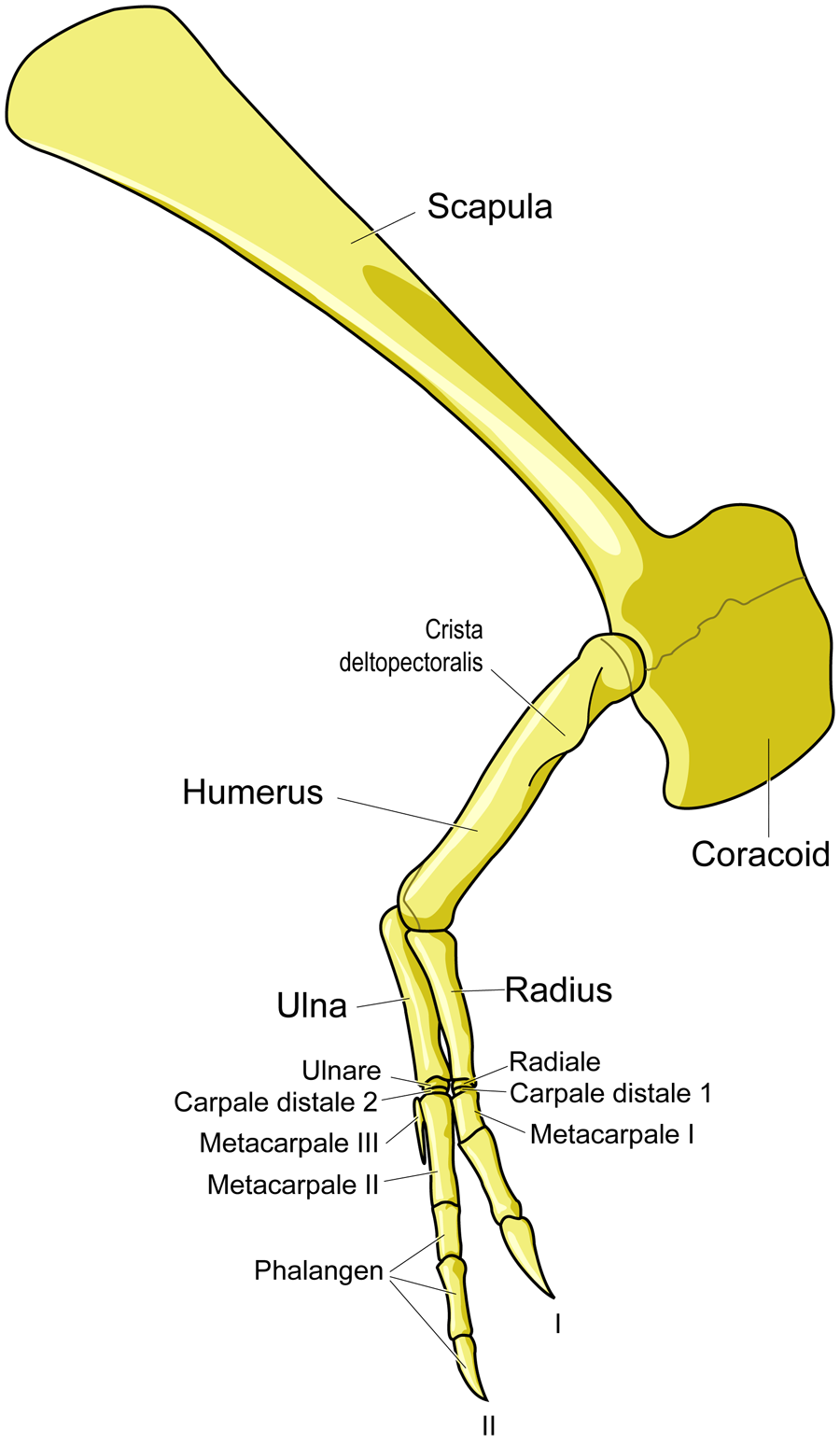
Labelled diagram of the right arm and shoulder blade of Gorgosaurus

Tyrannosaurids walked exclusively on their hindlimbs, so their leg bones were massive. In contrast to the forelimbs, the hindlimbs were longer compared to body size than almost any other theropods. Juveniles and even some smaller adults, like more basal tyrannosauroids, had longer tibiae than femora, a characteristic of cursorial (fast-running) dinosaurs like ornithomimids. Larger adults had leg proportions characteristic of slower-moving animals, but not to the extent seen in other large theropods like abelisaurids or carnosaurs. The third metatarsals of tyrannosaurids were pinched between the second and fourth metatarsals, forming a structure known as the arctometatarsus. Tyrannosaurids also had large preserved leg muscle attachments and low rotational inertia relative to their body mass, indicating that they could turn more quickly than other large theropods.

It is unclear when the arctometatarsus first evolved; it was not present in the earliest tyrannosauroids like Dilong, but was found in the later Appalachiosaurus. This structure also characterized troodontids, ornithomimids and caenagnathids, but its absence in the earliest tyrannosauroids indicates that it was acquired by convergent evolution.

=== Soft tissue reconstruction ===
A comparative analysis of the teeth suggests that tyrannosaurids, as well as the other large theropods, had lips that protected their teeth from external damage. This anatomical feature gave these animals more visual resemblance to lepidosaurs than to closely related crocodilians.

== Classification ==
The name Deinodontidae was coined by Edward Drinker Cope in 1866 for this family, and continued to be used in place of the newer name Tyrannosauridae through the 1960s. The type genus of the Deinodontidae is Deinodon, which was named after isolated teeth from Montana. However, in a 1970 review of North American tyrannosaurs, Dale Russell concluded that Deinodon was not a valid taxon, and used the name Tyrannosauridae in place of Deinodontidae, stating that this was in accordance with ICZN rules. Therefore, Tyrannosauridae is preferred by modern experts. A petition to officially conserve the family Tyrannosauridae and suppress the family Deinodontidae was submitted to the International Commission on Zoological Nomenclature (ICZN) in 2020, which was approved in 2024.

Tyrannosaurus was named by Henry Fairfield Osborn in 1905, along with the family Tyrannosauridae. The name is derived from the Ancient Greek words τυραννος (tyrannos) ('tyrant') and σαυρος (sauros) ('lizard'). The very common suffix -idae is normally appended to zoological family names and is derived from the Greek suffix -ιδαι -idai, which indicates a plural noun.

=== Taxonomy ===
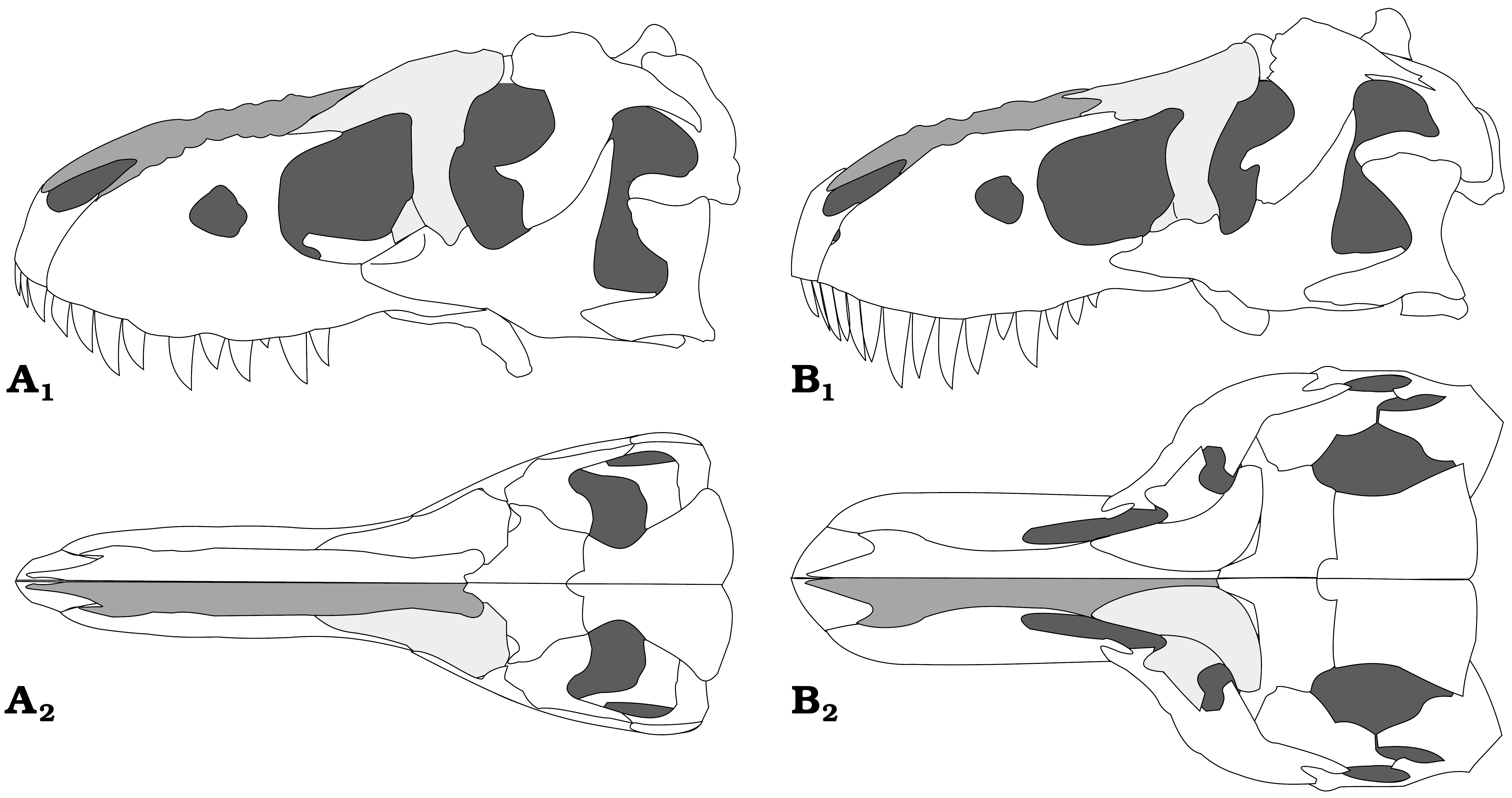
Diagram showing the differences between a generalised Tarbosaurus (A) and Tyrannosaurus (B) skull

Tyrannosauridae is a family in rank-based Linnaean taxonomy, within the superfamily Tyrannosauroidea and the suborder Theropoda.

Tyrannosauridae is uncontroversially divided into two subfamilies. Albertosaurinae comprises the North American genera Albertosaurus and Gorgosaurus, while Tyrannosaurinae includes Daspletosaurus, Teratophoneus, Bistahieversor, Tarbosaurus, Nanuqsaurus, Zhuchengtyrannus, and Tyrannosaurus itself. Some authors include the species Gorgosaurus libratus in the genus Albertosaurus and Tarbosaurus bataar in the genus Tyrannosaurus, while others prefer to retain Gorgosaurus and Tarbosaurus as separate genera. Albertosaurines are characterized by more slender builds, lower skulls, and proportionately longer tibiae than tyrannosaurines. In tyrannosaurines, the sagittal crest on the parietals continues forward onto the frontals. In 2014, Lü Junchang et al. described the Alioramini as a tribe within the Tyrannosauridae containing the genera Alioramus and Qianzhousaurus. Their phylogenetic analysis indicated that the tribe was located at the base of the Tyrannosaurinae. Some authors, such as George Olshevsky and Tracy Ford, have created other subdivisions or tribes for various combinations of tyrannosaurids within the subfamilies. However, these have not been phylogenetically defined, and usually consisted of genera that are now considered synonymous with other genera or species.

Additional subfamilies have been named for more fragmentary genera, including Aublysodontinae and Deinodontinae. However, the genera Aublysodon and Deinodon are usually considered nomina dubia, so they and their eponymous subfamilies are usually excluded from taxonomies of tyrannosaurids. An additional tyrannosaurid, Raptorex, was initially described as a more primitive tyrannosauroid, but likely represents a juvenile tyrannosaurine similar to Tarbosaurus. However, as it is known only from a juvenile specimen, it is also currently considered a nomen dubium. However, Thomas Carr maintains its validity and finds it to be similar to tyrannosaurines.

=== Phylogeny ===
With the advent of phylogenetic taxonomy in vertebrate paleontology, Tyrannosauridae has been given several explicit definitions. The original was produced by Paul Sereno in 1998, and included all tyrannosauroids closer to Tyrannosaurus than to either Alectrosaurus, Aublysodon or Nanotyrannus.

In 2001, Thomas R. Holtz Jr. published a cladistic analysis of the Tyrannosauridae. He concluded that there were two subfamilies: the more primitive Aublysodontinae, characterized by unserrated premaxillary teeth; and the Tyrannosaurinae. The Aublysodontinae included Aublysodon, the "Kirtland Aublysodon", and Alectrosaurus. Holtz also found that Siamotyrannus exhibited some of the synapomorphies of the tyrannosauridae, but lay "outside the [family] proper."

Later in the same paper, he proposed that Tyrannosauridae be defined as "all descendants of the most recent common ancestor of Tyrannosaurus and Aublysodon". He also criticized definitions previously proposed by other workers, like one proposed by Paul Sereno, that the Tyrannosauridae was "all taxa closer to "Tyrannosaurus" than to Alectrosaurus, Aublysodon, and Nanotyrannus". Holtz observed that since Nanotyrannus was probably a misidentified T. rex juvenile, Sereno's proposed definition would have the family Tyrannosauridae as a subtaxon of the genus Tyrannosaurus. Further, his proposed definition of the subfamily Tyrannosaurinae would also be limited to Tyrannosaurus.

A 2003 attempt by Christopher Brochu included Albertosaurus, Alectrosaurus, Alioramus, Daspletosaurus, Gorgosaurus, Tarbosaurus and Tyrannosaurus in the definition. Holtz redefined the clade in 2004 to use all of the above as specifiers except for Alioramus and Alectrosaurus, which his analysis could not place with certainty. However, in the same paper, Holtz also provided a completely different definition, including all theropods more closely related to Tyrannosaurus than to Eotyrannus. The most recent definition is that of Sereno in 2005, which defined Tyrannosauridae as the least inclusive clade containing Albertosaurus, Gorgosaurus and Tyrannosaurus.

Cladistic analyses of tyrannosaurid phylogeny often find Tarbosaurus and Tyrannosaurus to be sister taxa, with Daspletosaurus more basal than either. A close relationship between Tarbosaurus and Tyrannosaurus is supported by numerous skull features, including the pattern of sutures between certain bones, the presence of a crescent-shaped crest on the postorbital bone behind each eye, and a very deep maxilla with a noticeable downward curve on the lower edge, among others. An alternative hypothesis was presented in a 2003 study by Phil Currie and colleagues, which found weak support for Daspletosaurus as a basal member of a clade also including Tarbosaurus and Alioramus, both from Asia, based on the absence of a bony prong connecting the nasal and lacrimal bones. Alioramus was found to be the closest relative of Tarbosaurus in this study, based on a similar pattern of stress distribution in the skull.

A related study also noted a locking mechanism in the lower jaw shared between the two genera. In a separate paper, Currie noted the possibility that Alioramus might represent a juvenile Tarbosaurus, but stated that the much higher tooth count and more prominent nasal crests in Alioramus suggest it is a distinct genus. Similarly, Currie uses the high tooth count of Nanotyrannus to suggest that it may be a distinct genus, rather than a juvenile Tyrannosaurus as most other experts believe. However, the discovery and description of Qianzhousaurus has since led many researchers to conclude that Alioramus is not a close relation to Tarbosaurus, instead belonging to a newly described tribe of tyrannosaurids; the Alioramini. Qianzhousaurus further reveals that similar long-snouted tyrannosaurids were widely distributed throughout Asia and would have shared the same environment while avoiding competition with larger and more robust tyrannosaurines by hunting different prey.

Brusatte & Carr, 2016

- Tyrannosauridae
  - Albertosaurinae
    - Gorgosaurus
    - Albertosaurus
  - Tyrannosaurinae
    - - Alioramini
        - Qianzhousaurus
        - - Alioramus remotus
          - Alioramus altai
    - - - Nanuqsaurus
        - Teratophoneus
      - - Lythronax
        - - - Daspletosaurus torosus
            - Daspletosaurus horneri
          - - Zhuchengtyrannus
            - - Tarbosaurus
              - Tyrannosaurus

Fiorillo et al. 2014

- Tyrannosauridae
  - Albertosaurinae
    - Albertosaurus
    - Gorgosaurus
  - Tyrannosaurinae
    - - Daspletosaurus
      - Two Medicine taxon
    - - Teratophoneus
      - - Bistahieversor
        - - Lythronax
          - - Nanuqsaurus
            - - - Tarbosaurus
                - Zhuchengtyrannus
              - Tyrannosaurus

Loewen et al. 2013

- Tyrannosauridae
  - - Gorgosaurus
    - Albertosaurus
  - Tyrannosaurinae
    - Dinosaur Park tyrannosaurid
    - - Daspletosaurus
      - - Daspletosaurus horneri
        - - Teratophoneus
          - - Bistahieversor
            - - Lythronax
              - - Tyrannosaurus
                - - Tarbosaurus
                  - Zhuchengtyrannus

== Paleobiology ==
=== Growth ===
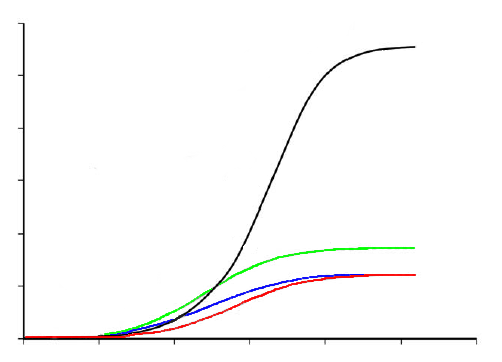
Hypothesized growth curves (body mass versus age) of four tyrannosaurids

Paleontologist Gregory Erickson and colleagues have studied the growth and life history of tyrannosaurids. Analysis of bone histology can determine the age of a specimen when it died. Growth rates can be examined when the age of various individuals are plotted against their size on a graph. Erickson has shown that after a long time as juveniles, tyrannosaurs underwent tremendous growth spurts for about four years midway through their lives. After the rapid growth phase ended with sexual maturity, growth slowed down considerably in adult animals. A tyrannosaurid growth curve is S-shaped, with the maximum growth rate of individuals around 14 years of age.

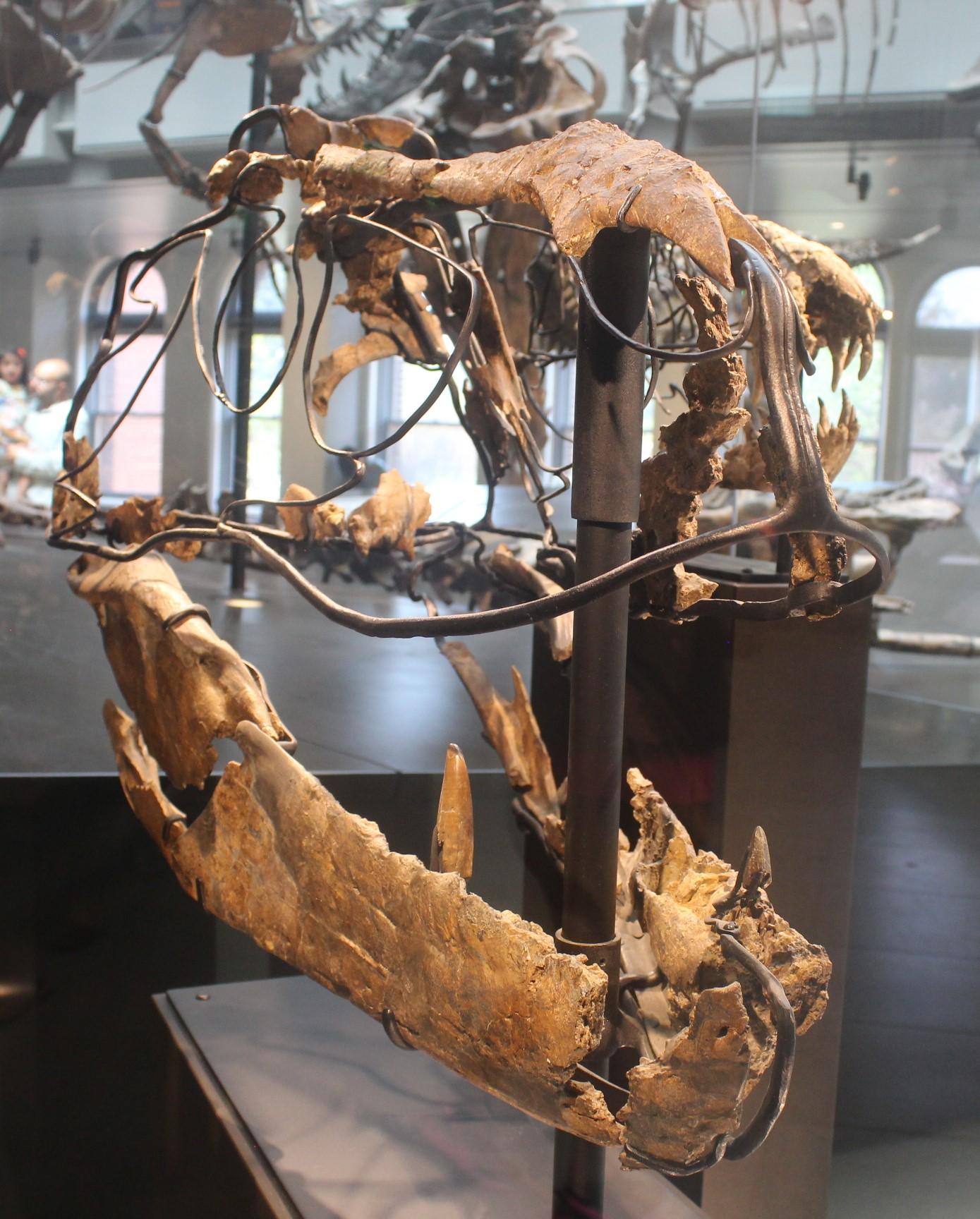
Skull of a juvenile T. rex formerly classified as Dinotyrannus megagracilis

The Stygivenator holotype (LACM 28471, the "Jordan theropod"), possibly a juvenile T. rex, is estimated to have weighed only 29.9 kilograms (66 lb) at only 2 years old, while one of the largest T. rex specimens, such as FMNH PR2081 ("Sue"), most likely weighed about 5,654 kg (12,465 lb), estimated to have been 28 years old, an age which may have been close to the maximum for the species. T. rex juveniles remained under 1,800 kg (4,000 lb) until approximately 14 years of age, when body size began to increase dramatically. During this rapid growth phase, a young T. rex would gain an average of 600 kg (1,300 lb) a year for the next four years. This slowed after 16 years, and at 18 years of age, the curve plateaus again, indicating that growth slowed dramatically. For example, only 600 kg (1,300 lb) separated the 28-year-old "Sue" from a 22-year-old Canadian specimen (RTMP 81.12.1). This sudden change in growth rate may indicate physical maturity, a hypothesis that is supported by the discovery of medullary tissue in the femur of an 18-year-old T. rex from Montana (MOR 1125, also known as "B-rex"). Medullary tissue is found only in female birds during ovulation, indicating that "B-rex" was of reproductive age.

Other tyrannosaurids exhibit extremely similar growth curves, although with lower growth rates corresponding to their lower adult sizes. Compared to albertosaurines, Daspletosaurus showed a faster growth rate during the rapid growth period due to its higher adult weight. The maximum growth rate in Daspletosaurus was 180 kilograms (400 lb) per year, based on a mass estimate of 1,800 kg (4,000 lb) in adults. Other authors have suggested higher adult weights for Daspletosaurus; this would change the magnitude of the growth rate, but not the overall pattern. The youngest known Albertosaurus is a two-year-old discovered in the Dry Island bonebed, which would have weighed about 50 kg (110 lb) and measured slightly more than 2 metres (6.6 ft) in length. The 10-metre (33 ft) specimen from the same quarry is the oldest and largest known, at 28 years of age. The fastest growth rate is estimated to occur around 12–16 years of age, reaching 122 kg (269 lb) per year, based on a 1,300 kg (2,900 lb) adult, which is about a fifth of the rate for T.-rex. For Gorgosaurus, the calculated maximum growth rate is about 110 kilograms (240 lb) during the rapid growth phase, which is comparable to that of Albertosaurus.

In 2021, Funston and colleagues described possible perinatal tyrannosaurid ungual and premaxillary tooth (cf. Albertosaurus sarcophagus) from the Horseshoe Canyon Formation (Alberta, Canada) and dentary (cf. Daspletosaurus horneri) from the Two Medicine Formation (Montana, United States). They estimated that the ungual and dentary belonged to young tyrannosaurids measuring 1.1 m (3.6 ft) and 71.5 cm (2.35 ft) in total body length respectively. While eggshells have not been found in association with the specimens, the location where the purported neonate tyrannosaurids were uncovered suggests that they used the same nest sites with contemporary species. Longrich et al. (2026) argued that the ungual (UALVP 59599) more closely resembles the morphology (shape) of an ornithomimosaurian ungual, especially that of Struthiomimus altus, and re-identified it as an ornithomimid, and that the dentary (MOR 268) belongs to an albertosaurine due to the similarities with Gorgosaurus.

In July 2026, Longrich and colleagues described a third metatarsal bone of perinate (hatchling) Tyrannosaurus rex and cf. Gorgosaurus libratus, RSKM P2416.82 from the Frenchman Formation and TMP 1981.16.475 from the Dinosaur Park Formation respectively. Histological analyses reveal that lines of arrested growth are absent in both specimens, indicative of hatchling or embryonic stage. Synchrotron scans of each specimen reveal the relatively high density of the outer surface and the pattern changes in cortical (outer layer) bone structure, with a layer similar to the hatchling/neonatal line of modern oviparous (egg-laying) and viviparous (giving live birth) taxa that characterize the transition from embryonic to hatchling stage. The scans also detected evidence of Haversian bone remodeling, the continuous process of bone tissue breaking down and rebuilding to form secondary canals (tubular channels connecting bones), which are indicative of hatchling stage and precociality, relative maturity and mobility at birth. The layer lining the medullary cavity of both specimens likely represent endosteal bone deposition, during which new bone matrix is deposited on the inner surface of the cortical bone. The authors also described a partial dentary (FMNH PR 4920) from the Hell Creek Formation and isolated teeth from the Lance Formation as hatchling T. rex and interpret their tooth wear as evidence of consuming relatively large vertebrates.

The body length and body mass of the hatchling T. rex (RSKM P2416.82) are estimated to be approximately 75 cm (2.46 ft) and 2.5 kg (5.5 lb) respectively, and those of the hatchling cf. G. libratus (TMP 1981.16.475) are estimated to be approximately 70 cm (2.3 ft) and 2.4 kg (5.3 lb) respectively. On the basis of these body size estimates, Longrich et al. (2026) suggested that the clutch of the confirmed, reproductively mature female T. rex (MOR 1125) would have weighed at least 54–60 kg (119–132 lb) which would possibly correspond to 21-32 eggs. They further stated that larger clutch sizes are also plausible, indicating that tyrannosaurids possibly employed R-selection, a reproductive strategy that maximizes the number of offsprings through large clutch size and minimal parental investment, which would have resulted in rapid maturation of the hatchlings, slower than that of modern birds. It is also likely that the reproduction strategy of tyrannosaurids was an intermediate between R-selection and K-selection, the latter of which would maximize parental investment with fewer number of offsprings and delayed maturation. Given the uniparental care observed in modern crocodilians and basal (early-diverging) birds, most non-avian dinosaurs including T. rex were likely uniparental as well. The authors also estimated that the relative size of tyrannosaurid hatchlings and eggs are larger than that of squamates, turtles, crocodilians, pterosaurs, and certain dinosaur clades (protoceratopsids and basal sauropodomorphs), but smaller than that of eumaniraptorans and modern birds, probably weighing less in both relative and absolute size than those of the elephant bird Aepyornis maximus and the South Island giant moa.

Fossil footprints from the Wapiti Formation suggest that as tyrannosaurids grew, the feet became wider with thicker toes to support their weight. The broader feet suggest that adult tyrannosaurids were slower-moving than their offspring.

=== Life history ===
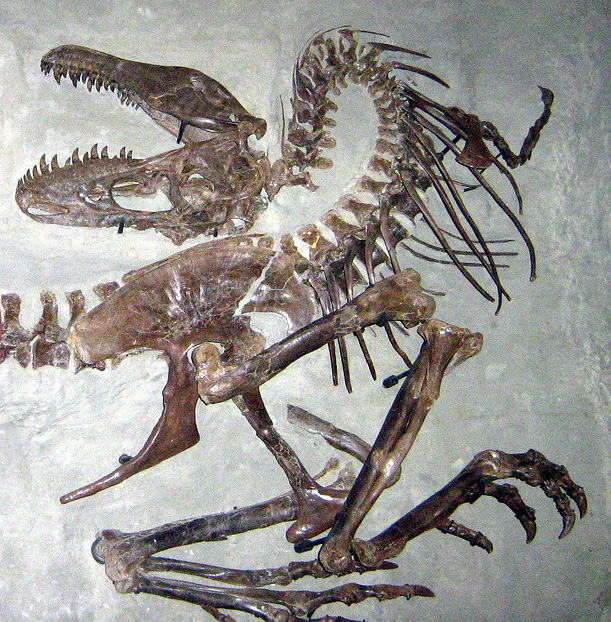
Nearly complete skeleton of a subadult Gorgosaurus libratus, from the Royal Tyrrell Museum of Palaeontology

The end of the rapid growth phase suggests the onset of sexual maturity in Albertosaurus, although growth continued at a slower rate throughout the animals' lives. Sexual maturation while still actively growing appears to be a shared trait among small and large dinosaurs as well as in large mammals, such as humans and elephants. This pattern of relatively early sexual maturation differs strikingly from the pattern in birds, which delay their sexual maturity until after they have finished growing.

By tabulating the number of specimens of each age group, Erickson and his colleagues were able to draw conclusions about life history in tyranosauridae populations. Their analysis showed that while juveniles were rare in the fossil record, subadults in the rapid growth phase and adults were far more common. Over half of the known T. rex specimens appear to have died within six years of reaching sexual maturity, a pattern that is also seen in other tyrannosaurs and in some large, long-lived birds and mammals today. These species are characterized by high infant mortality rates, followed by relatively low mortality among juveniles. Mortality increases again following sexual maturity, partly due to the stresses of reproduction. While this could be due to preservation or collection biases, Erickson hypothesized that the difference was due to low mortality among juveniles over a certain size, which is also seen in some modern large mammals, like elephants. This low mortality may have resulted from a lack of predation, since tyrannosaurs surpassed all contemporaneous predators in size by the age of two. Paleontologists have not found enough Daspletosaurus remains for a similar analysis, but Erickson notes that the same general trend seems to apply.

The tyrannosaurids spent as much as half its life in the juvenile phase before ballooning up to near-maximum size in only a few years. This, along with the lack of predators intermediate in size between adult tyrannosaurids and small theropods, suggests these niches may have been filled by juvenile tyrannosaurids. This is seen in modern Komodo dragons, where hatchlings start off as tree-dwelling insectivores and slowly mature into massive apex predators capable of taking down large vertebrates. However, non-tyrannosaurid large theropods such as Allosaurus have also been found to exhibit similar life histories with juveniles filling the niches of cursorial mid-sized carnivores, in spite of living in ecosystems with true mid-sized carnivores present.

Albertosaurus have been found in aggregations that some have suggested to represent mixed-age packs that filled separate roles during hunting based on age class, with the more cursorial juveniles driving prey towards the adults. Similar behavior is practiced occasionally by extant crocodilians.

The discovery of two exceptionally preserved juvenile skulls from Gorgosaurus suggests that Gorgosaurus underwent the morphological shift from gracile juveniles to robust adults at an earlier age than Tyrannosaurus, to which it was compared in a study published by Jared Voris et al., suggests that the ontogenetic changes occurred at roughly 5-7 years of age in Gorgosaurus; much earlier than its larger and later relative. However, both tyrannosaur genera underwent these ontogenetic transformations at a similar percent of skull length relative to the large known adult individuals. The study's results likewise indicate that there is a dissociation between body size and cranial development in tyrannosaurs, while simultaneously allowing better identification of juvenile remains that may have been misidentified in museum fossil collections. It is estimated that an ontogenetic dietary shift of Gorgosaurus and Albertosaurus occurs when the mandibular length reaches 58 cm (1.90 ft), indicating that this is the stage when their bite force increases exponentially and when they begin to pursuit large prey.

=== Locomotion ===
Locomotion abilities are best studied for Tyrannosaurus, and there are two main issues concerning this: how well it could turn; and what its maximum straight-line speed was likely to have been. Tyrannosaurus may have been slow to turn, possibly taking one to two seconds to turn only 45° – an amount that humans, being vertically oriented and tail-less, can spin in a fraction of a second. The cause of the difficulty is rotational inertia, since much of Tyrannosaurus's mass was some distance from its center of gravity, like a human carrying a heavy timber.

Scientists have produced a wide range of maximum speed estimates, mostly around 11 metres per second (25 mph), but a few as low as 5–11 metres per second (11–25 mph), and a few as high as 20 metres per second (45 mph). Researchers have to rely on various estimating techniques because, while there are many tracks of very large theropods walking, so far none have been found of very large theropods running—and this absence may indicate that they did not run.

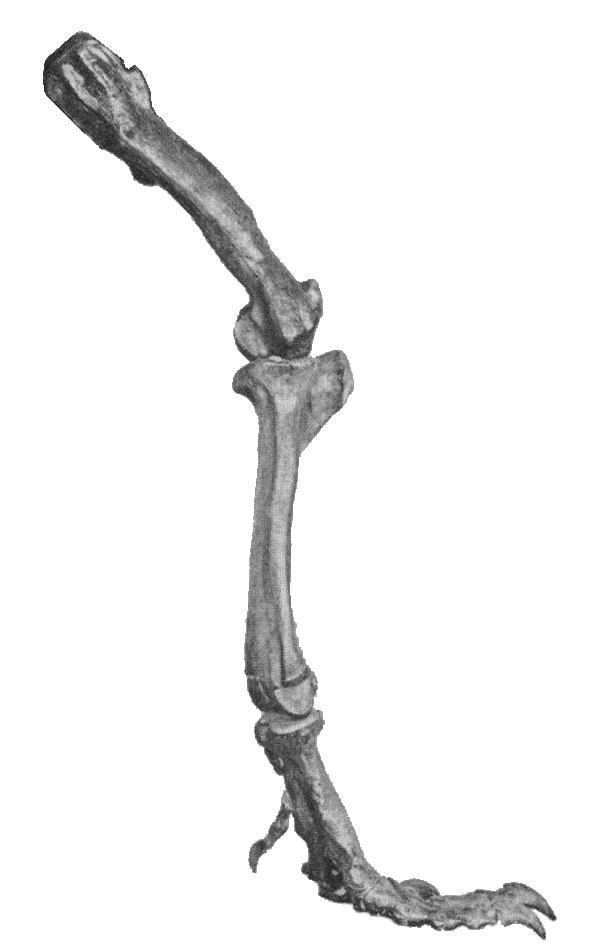
Skeletal anatomy of a T. rex right leg

Jack Horner and Don Lessem argued in 1993 that Tyrannosaurus was slow and probably could not run (no airborne phase in mid-stride). However, Holtz (1998) concluded that tyrannosaurids and their close relatives were the fastest large theropods. Christiansen (1998) estimated that the leg bones of Tyrannosaurus were not significantly stronger than those of elephants, which are relatively limited in their top speed and never actually run (there is no airborne phase), and hence proposed that the dinosaur's maximum speed would have been about 11 metres per second (25 mph), which is about the speed of a human sprinter. Farlow and colleagues (1995) have argued that a 6- to 8-ton Tyrannosaurus would have been critically or even fatally injured if it had fallen while moving quickly, since its torso would have slammed into the ground at a deceleration of 6 g (six times the acceleration due to gravity, or about 60 metres/s^{2}) and its tiny arms could not have reduced the impact. However, giraffes have been known to gallop at 50 km/h (31 mph), despite the risk that they might break a leg or worse, which can be fatal even in a "safe" environment such as a zoo. Thus it is quite possible that Tyrannosaurus also moved fast when necessary and had to accept such risks; this scenario has been studied for Allosaurus too. Most recent research on Tyrannosaurus locomotion does not narrow down speeds further than a range from 17 to 40 km/h (11 to 25 mph), i.e. from walking or slow running to moderate-speed running. A computer model study in 2007 estimated running speeds, based on data taken directly from fossils, and claimed that T. rex had a top running speed of 8 metres per second (18 mph). (Probably a juvenile individual.)

Studies by Eric Snively et al., published in 2019 indicate that tyrannosaurids such as Tarbosaurus and Tyrannosaurus itself were more manoeuvrable than allosauroids of comparable size due to low rotational inertia compared to their body mass combined with large leg muscles. As a result, it is hypothesized that tyrannosaurids were capable of making relatively quick turns and could likely pivot their bodies more quickly when close to their prey, or that while turning, they could "pirouette" on a single planted foot while the alternating leg was held out in a suspended swing during pursuit. The results of this study potentially could shed light on how agility could have contributed to the success of tyrannosaurid evolution.

Additionally, a 2020 study indicates that tyrannosaurids were exceptionally efficient walkers. Studies by Dececchi et al., compared the leg proportions, body mass, and the gaits of more than 70 species of theropod dinosaurs including tyrannosaurids. The research team then applied a variety of methods to estimate each dinosaur's top speed when running as well as how much energy each dinosaur expended while moving at more relaxed speeds such as when walking. Among smaller to medium-sized species such as dromaeosaurids, longer legs appear to be an adaptation for faster running, in line with previous results by other researchers. But for theropods weighing over 1,000 kg (2,200 lb), top running speed is limited by body size, so longer legs instead were found to have correlated with low-energy walking. The results of the study further indicated that smaller theropods evolved long legs for speed as a means to both aid in hunting and escape from larger predators while larger predatory theropods that evolved long legs did so to reduce the energy costs and increase foraging efficiency, as they were freed from the demands of predation pressure due to their role as apex predators. Compared to more basal groups of theropods in the study, tyrannosaurids showed a marked increase in foraging efficiency due to reduced energy expenditures during hunting and scavenging. This likely resulted in tyrannosaurs having a reduced need for hunting forays and requiring less food to sustain themselves as a result. Additionally, the research, in conjunction with studies that show tyrannosaurs were more agile than other large-bodied theropods, indicates they were quite well-adapted to a long-distance stalking approach followed by a quick burst of speed to go for the kill. Analogies can be noted between tyrannosaurids and modern wolves as a result, supported by evidence that at least some tyrannosaurids such as Albertosaurus were hunting in group settings.

=== Integument ===
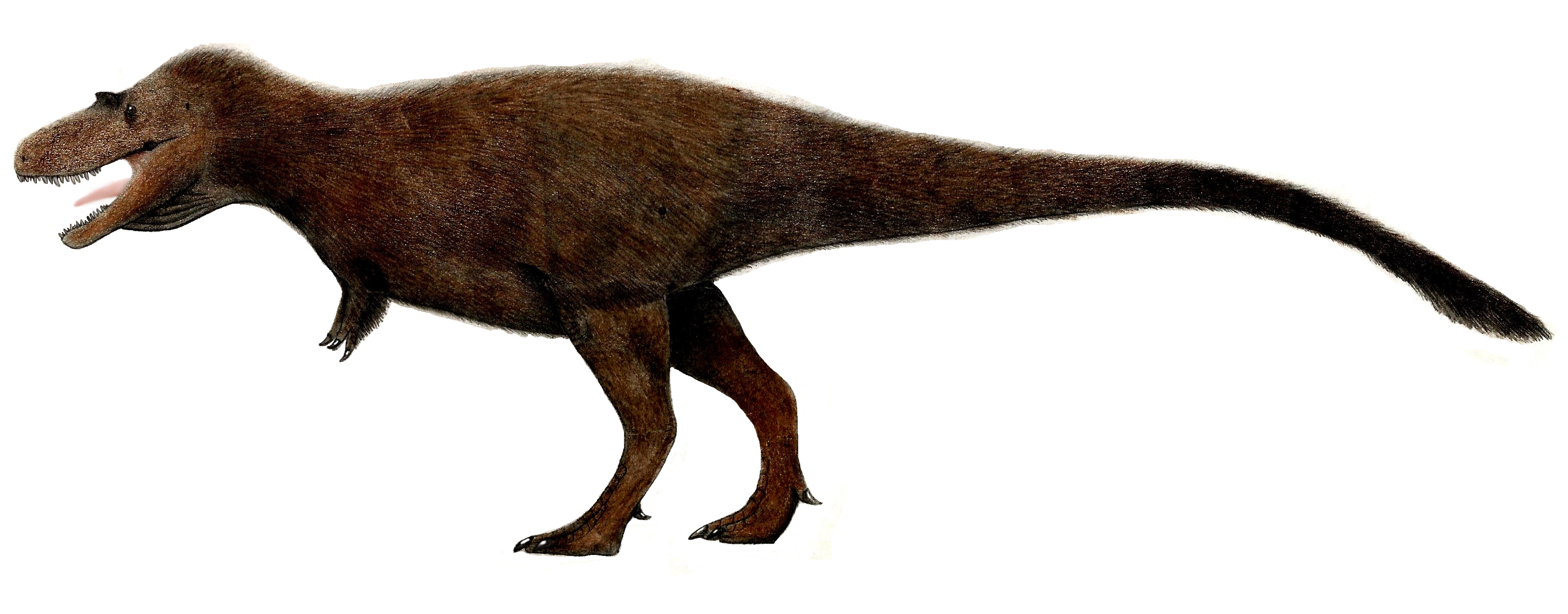
Gorgosaurus restoration with speculative plumage, a trait inferred by phylogenetic bracketing

An ongoing debate in the paleontological community surrounds the extent and nature of tyrannosaurid integumentary covering. Long filamentous structures have been preserved along with skeletal remains of numerous coelurosaurs from the Early Cretaceous Yixian Formation and other nearby geological formations from Liaoning, China. These filaments have usually been interpreted as "protofeathers," homologous with the branched feathers found in birds and some non-avian theropods, although other hypotheses have been proposed. A skeleton of Dilong was described in 2004 that included the first example of "protofeathers" in a tyrannosauroid. Similarly to down feathers of modern birds, the "protofeathers" found in Dilong were branched but not pennaceous, and may have been used for insulation. The discovery and description of the 9-metre (30 ft) feathered tyrannosauroid Yutyrannus in 2012 indicates the possibility large tyrannosaurids were also feathered as adults.

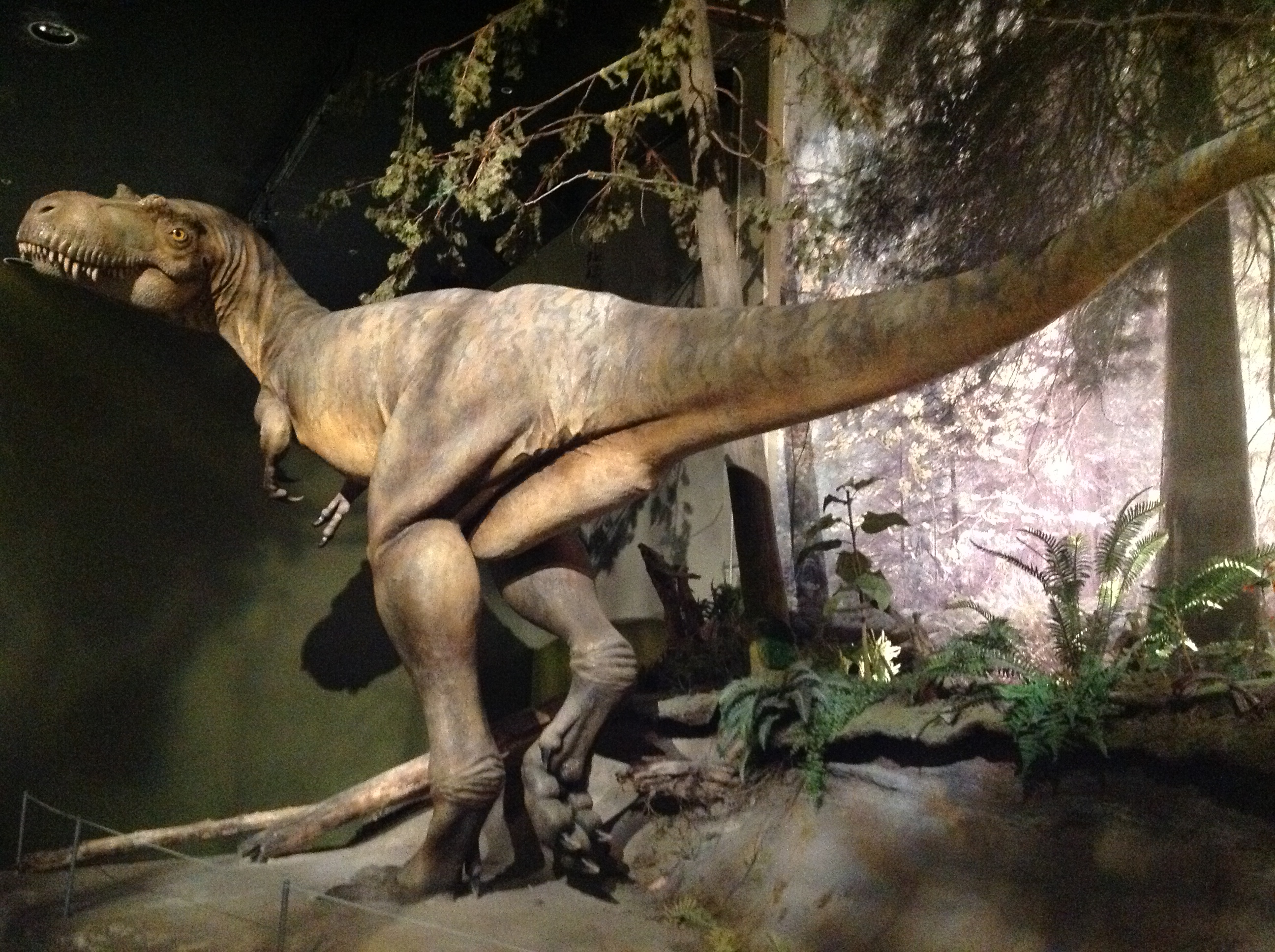
Albertosaurus sculpture from Royal Tyrrell Museum depicted with featherless skin

Based on the principle of phylogenetic bracketing, it was predicted that tyrannosaurids might also possess such feathering. However, a study in 2017 published by a team of researchers in Biology Letters described tyrannosaurid skin impressions collected in Alberta, Montana, and Mongolia, which came from five genera (Tyrannosaurus, Albertosaurus, Gorgosaurus, Daspletosaurus and Tarbosaurus). Although the skin impressions are small, they are widely dispersed across the post-cranium, being collectively located on the abdomen, thoracic region, ilium, pelvis, tail, and neck. They show a tight pattern of fine, non-overlapping pebbly scales (which co-author Scott Persons compared to those seen on the flanks of a crocodile) and preserve no hints of feathering. The basic texture is composed of tiny "basement scales" approximately 1 to 2 mm in diameter, with some impressions showing 7 mm "feature scales" interspersed between them. Additional scales can be seen in tyrannosaurid footprints. Studies find that the facial integument of tyrannosaurids had scales on the dentary and maxilla, cornified epidermis and armor-like skin on the subordinate regions.

Bell et al. performed an ancestral character reconstruction based on what is known about integument distribution in tyrannosauroids. Despite an 89% probability that tyrannosauroids started out with feathers, they determined that scaly tyrannosaurids have a 97% probability of being true. The data "provides compelling evidence of an entirely squamous covering in Tyrannosaurus," the team wrote, although they conceded that plumage may have still been present on the dorsal region where skin impressions haven't been found yet. Bell et al. hypothesizes that the scale impressions of tyrannosaurids are possibly reticula which are secondarily derived from feathers though evidence is needed to support this. However, others argue that this is because of taphonomic bias in tyrannosaurids.

It has yet to be determined why such an integumentary change might have occurred. A precedent for feather loss can be seen in other dinosaur groups such as ornithischians, in which filamentous structures were lost, and scales reappeared. Although gigantism has been suggested as a mechanism, Phil R. Bell, who co-authored the study, noted that the feathered Yutyrannus overlapped in size with Gorgosaurus and Albertosaurus. "The problem here is that we have big tyrannosaurs, some with feathers, some without that live in pretty similar climates. So what's the reason for this difference? We really don't know."

=== Vision ===
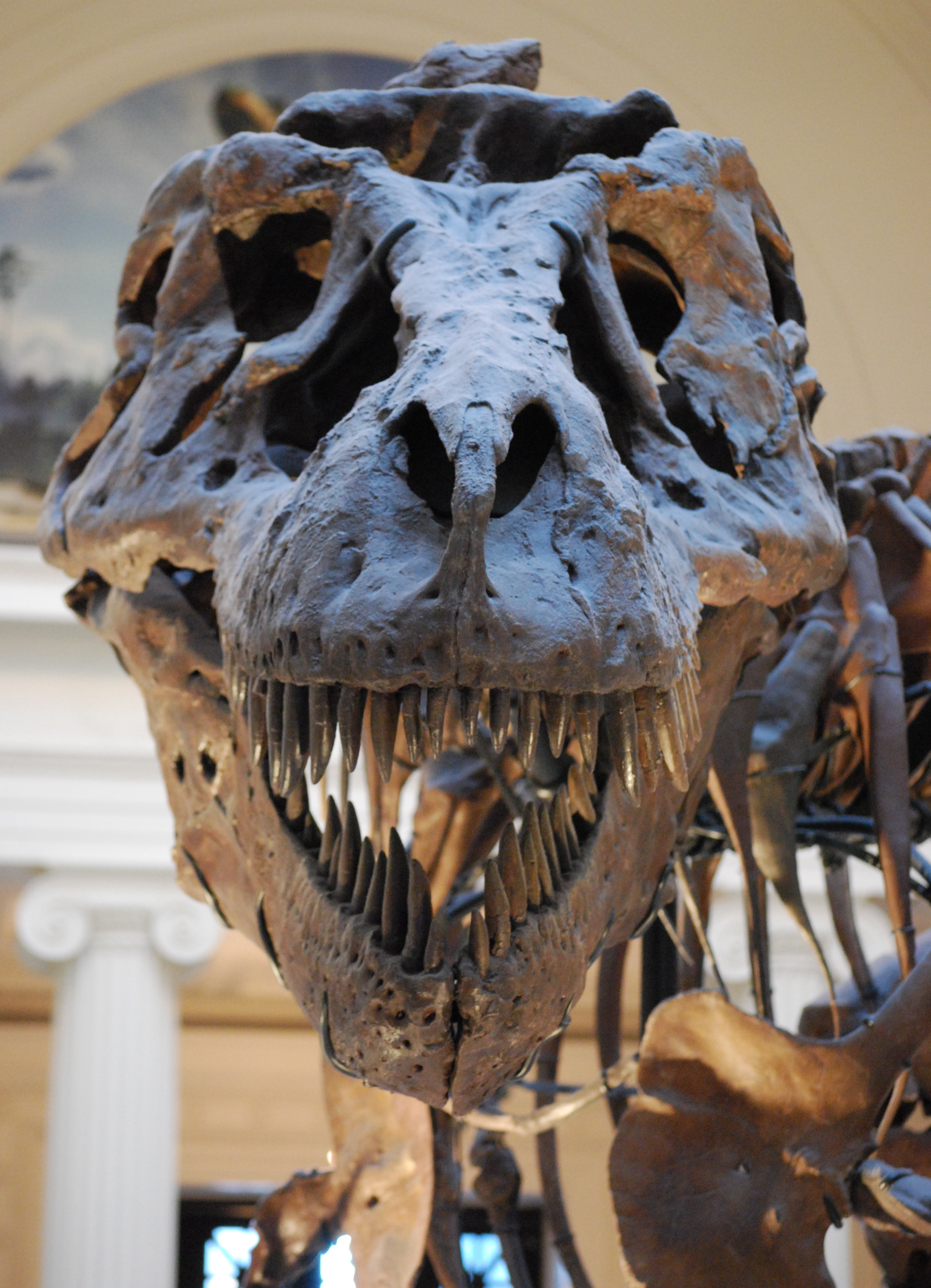
The eye-sockets of T. rex faced mainly forwards, giving it good binocular vision

The eye-sockets of Tyrannosaurus are positioned so that the eyes would point forward, giving them binocular vision slightly better than that of modern hawks and significantly better than that of falcons. While predatory theropods in general had binocular vision directly in front of their skull, Tyrannosaurus had a significantly larger area of overlap, which the authors suggested to be inconsistent with the hypothesis that this genus was an obligate scavenger. In contrast, Tarbosaurus had a narrower skull more typical of other tyrannosaurids in which the eyes faced primarily sideways. In Gorgosaurus specimens, the eye socket was circular rather than oval or keyhole-shaped as in other tyrannosaurid genera. In Daspletosaurus, this was a tall oval, somewhere in between the circular shape seen in Gorgosaurus and the 'keyhole' shape of Tyrannosaurus.

=== Facial sensitivity ===
Based on comparisons of bone texture of Daspletosaurus with extant crocodilians, a detailed study in 2017 by Thomas D. Carr et al. found that tyrannosaurs had large, flat scales on their snouts. At the center of these scales were small keratinised patches. In crocodilians, such patches cover bundles of sensory neurons that can detect mechanical, thermal and chemical stimuli. They proposed that tyrannosaurs probably also had bundles of sensory neurons under their facial scales and may have used them to identify objects, measure the temperature of their nests and gently pick-up eggs and hatchlings. Similar adaptations are known from spinosaurids and the allosauroid Neovenator.

=== Bony crests ===
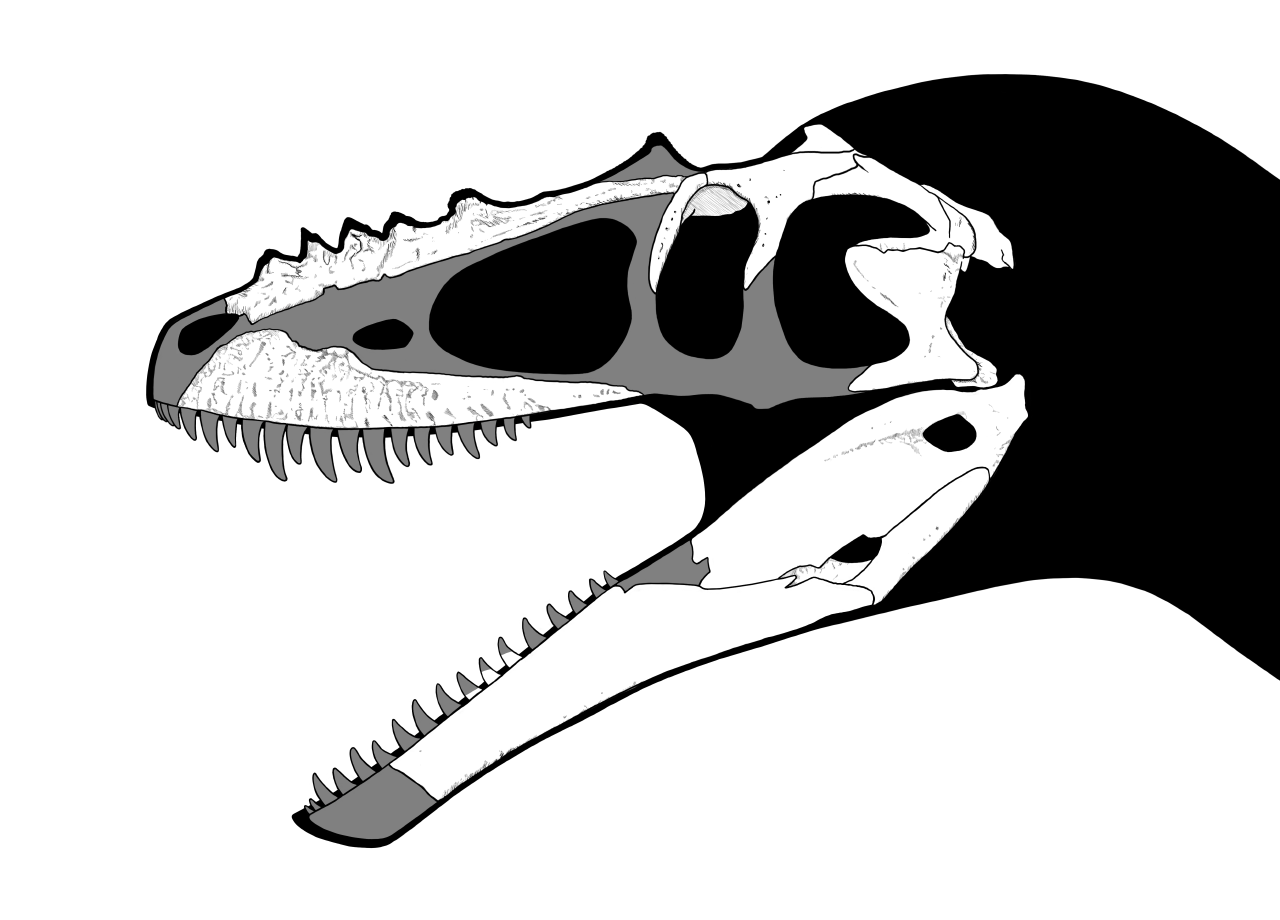
The skull of Alioramus with distinct nasal bumps

Bony crests are found on the skulls of many theropods, including many tyrannosaurids. Alioramus, a possible tyrannosaurid from Mongolia, bears a single row of five prominent bony bumps on the nasal bones; a similar row of much lower bumps is present on the skull of Appalachiosaurus, as well as some specimens of Daspletosaurus, Albertosaurus, and Tarbosaurus. In Albertosaurus, Gorgosaurus and Daspletosaurus, there is a prominent horn in front of each eye on the lacrimal bone. The lacrimal horn is absent in Tarbosaurus and Tyrannosaurus, which instead have a crescent-shaped crest behind each eye on the postorbital bone. These head crests may have been used for display, perhaps for species recognition or courtship behavior.

=== Thermoregulation ===
Tyrannosaurus, like most dinosaurs, was long thought to have an ectothermic ("cold-blooded") reptilian metabolism but was challenged by scientists like Robert T. Bakker and John Ostrom in the early years of the "Dinosaur Renaissance", beginning in the late 1960s. Tyrannosaurus rex itself was claimed to have been endothermic ("warm-blooded"), implying a very active lifestyle. Since then, several paleontologists have sought to determine the ability of Tyrannosaurus to regulate its body temperature. Histological evidence of high growth rates in young T. rex, comparable to those of mammals and birds, may support the hypothesis of a high metabolism. Growth curves indicate that, as in mammals and birds, T. rex growth was limited mostly to immature animals, rather than the indeterminate growth seen in most other vertebrates. It has been indicated that the temperature difference may have been no more than 4 to 5 °C (7 to 9 °F) between the vertebrae of the torso and the tibia of the lower leg. This small temperature range between the body core and the extremities was claimed by paleontologist Reese Barrick and geochemist William Showers to indicate that T. rex maintained a constant internal body temperature (homeothermy) and that it enjoyed a metabolism somewhere between ectothermic reptiles and endothermic mammals. Later they found similar results in Giganotosaurus specimens, who lived on a different continent and tens of millions of years earlier in time. Even if Tyrannosaurus rex does exhibit evidence of homeothermy, it does not necessarily mean that it was endothermic. Such thermoregulation may also be explained by gigantothermy, as in some living sea turtles.

== Paleoecology ==
=== Coexistence of Daspletosaurus and Gorgosaurus ===
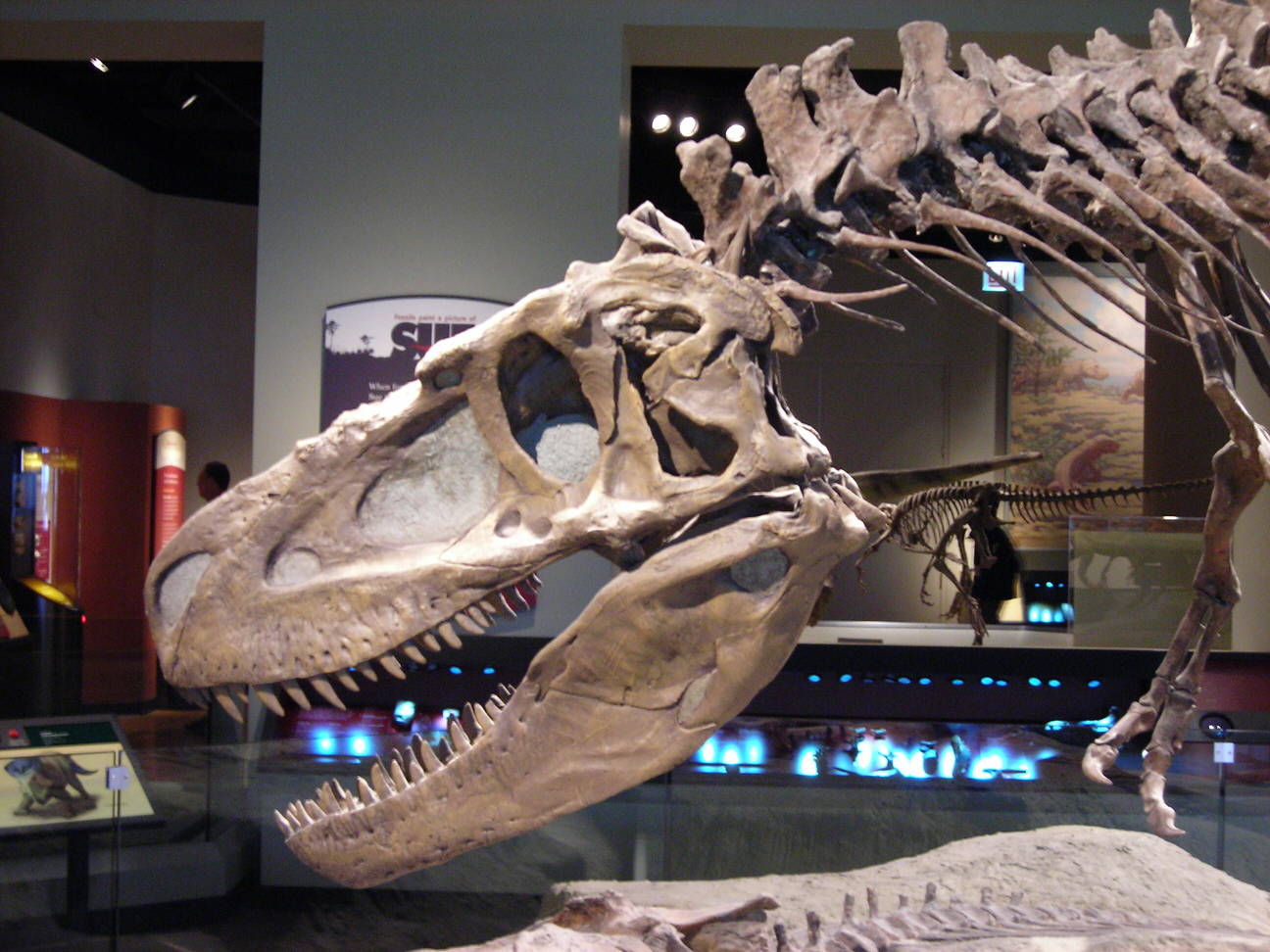
Skeleton of Daspletosaurus (specimen FMNH PR308) at the Field Museum in Chicago

In the Dinosaur Park Formation, Gorgosaurus lived alongside a rarer species of the tyrannosaurine Daspletosaurus. This is one of the few examples of two tyrannosaur genera coexisting. Similarly sized predators in modern predator guilds are separated into different ecological niches by anatomical, behavioral or geographical differences that limit competition. Niche differentiation between the Dinosaur Park tyrannosaurids is not well understood. In 1970, Dale Russell hypothesized that the more common Gorgosaurus actively hunted fleet-footed hadrosaurs, while the rarer and more troublesome ceratopsians and ankylosaurians (horned and heavily armoured dinosaurs) were left to the more heavily built Daspletosaurus. However, a specimen of Daspletosaurus (OTM 200) from the contemporaneous Two Medicine Formation of Montana preserves the digested remains of a juvenile hadrosaur in its gut region. Unlike some other groups of dinosaurs, neither genus was more common at higher or lower elevations than the other. However, Gorgosaurus appears more common in northern formations like the Dinosaur Park, with species of Daspletosaurus more abundant to the south. The same pattern is seen in other groups of dinosaurs. Chasmosaurine ceratopsians and hadrosaurine hadrosaurs are also more common in the Two Medicine Formation of Montana and in southwestern North America during the Campanian, while centrosaurines and lambeosaurines dominate in northern latitudes. Holtz has suggested that this pattern indicates shared ecological preferences between tyrannosaurines, chasmosaurines and hadrosaurines. At the end of the later Maastrichtian stage, tyrannosaurines like Tyrannosaurus rex, hadrosaurines like Edmontosaurus and chasmosaurines like Triceratops were widespread throughout western North America, while albertosaurines and centrosaurines became extinct, and lambeosaurines were rare.

=== Social behavior ===
There is limited evidence of social behavior among the tyrannosaurids. Researchers reported that a subadult and a juvenile skeleton were found in the same quarry as the "Sue" specimen, which has been used to support the hypothesis that tyrannosaurs may have lived in social groups of some kind. While there is no evidence of gregarious behavior in Gorgosaurus, there is evidence of some pack behavior for Albertosaurus and Daspletosaurus.

A young specimen of the Dinosaur Park Daspletosaurus species (TMP 94.143.1) shows bite marks on the face that were inflicted by another tyrannosaur. The bite marks are healed over, indicating that the animal survived the bite. A full-grown Dinosaur Park Daspletosaurus (TMP 85.62.1) also exhibits tyrannosaur bite marks, showing that attacks to the face were not limited to younger animals. While it is possible that the bites were attributable to other species, intraspecific aggression, including facial biting, is very common among predators. Facial bites are seen in other tyrannosaurs like Gorgosaurus and Tyrannosaurus, as well as in other theropod genera like Sinraptor and Saurornitholestes. Darren Tanke and Phil Currie hypothesize that the bites are due to intraspecific competition for territory or resources, or for dominance within a social group.

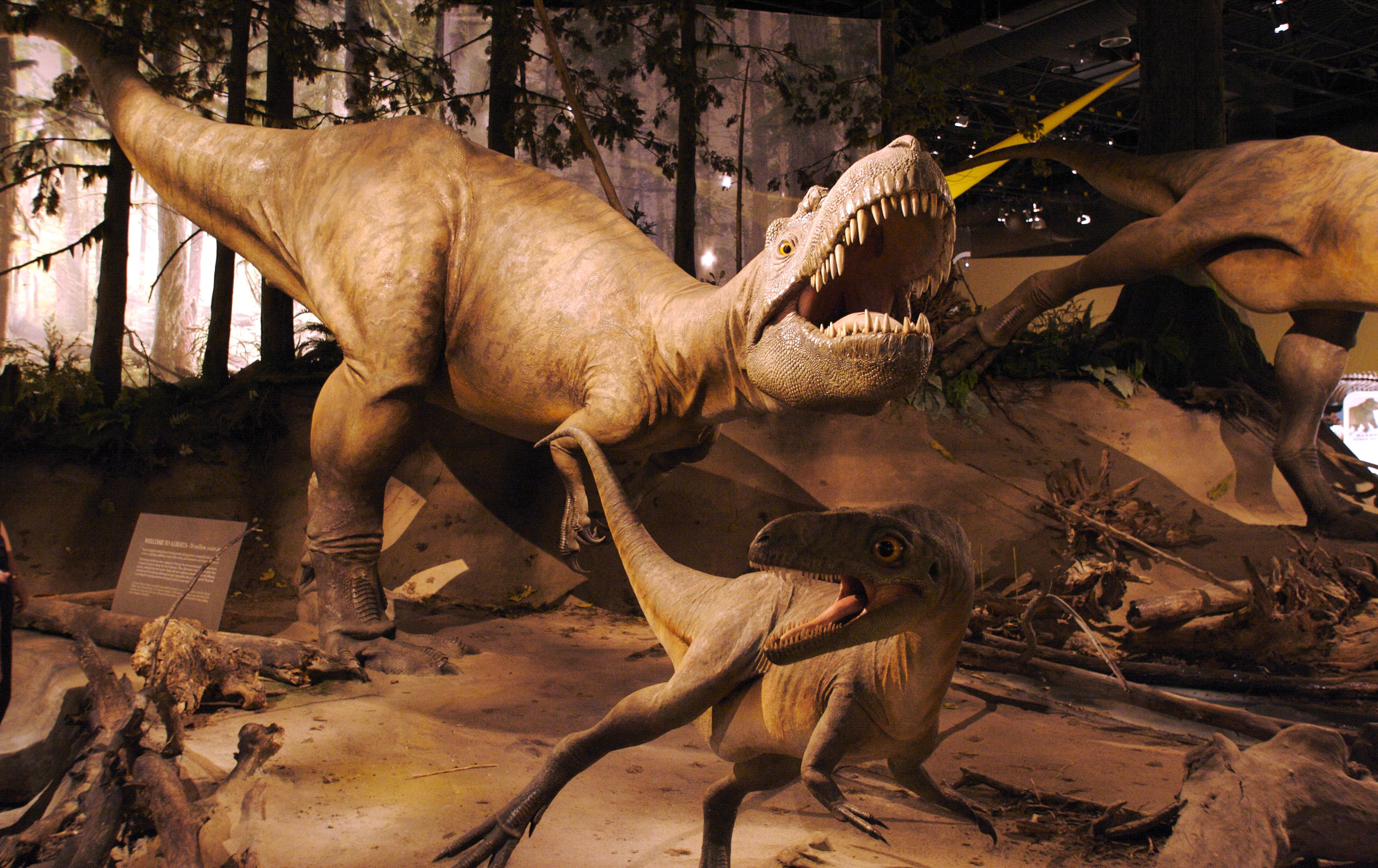
Full size model diorama of a group of Albertosaurus, Royal Tyrrell Museum

Evidence that Daspletosaurus lived in social groups comes from a bonebed found in the Two Medicine Formation of Montana. The bonebed includes the remains of three Daspletosaurus, including a large adult, a small juvenile, and another individual of intermediate size. At least five hadrosaurs are preserved at the same location. Geologic evidence indicates that the remains were not brought together by river currents but that all of the animals were buried simultaneously at the same location. The hadrosaur remains are scattered and bear many marks from tyrannosaur teeth, indicating that the Daspletosaurus were feeding on the hadrosaurs at the time of death. The cause of death is unknown. Currie speculates that the daspletosaurs formed a pack, although this cannot be stated with certainty. Other scientists are skeptical of the evidence for social groups in Daspletosaurus and other large theropods; Brian Roach and Daniel Brinkman have suggested that Daspletosaurus social interaction would have more closely resembled the modern Komodo dragon, where non-cooperative individuals mob carcasses, frequently attacking and even cannibalizing each other in the process.

The Dry Island bonebed discovered by Barnum Brown and his crew contains the remains of 22 Albertosaurus, the most individuals found in one locality of any Cretaceous theropod, and the second-most of any large theropod dinosaur behind the Allosaurus assemblage at the Cleveland-Lloyd Dinosaur Quarry in Utah. The group seems to be composed of one very old adult; eight adults between 17 and 23 years old; seven sub-adults undergoing their rapid growth phases at between 12 and 16 years old; and six juveniles between the ages of 2 and 11 years, who had not yet reached the growth phase. The near-absence of herbivore remains and the similar state of preservation between the many individuals at the Albertosaurus bonebed quarry led Phil Currie to conclude that the locality was not a predator trap like the La Brea Tar Pits in California, and that all of the preserved animals died at the same time. Currie claims this as evidence of pack behavior. Other scientists are skeptical, observing that the animals may have been driven together by drought, flood or for other reasons.

While it generally remains controversial, evidence does exist that supports the theory that at least some tyrannosaurids were social. In British Columbia's Wapiti Formation, a trackway composed of the footprints of three individual tyrannosaurids (named as the ichnogenus Bellatoripes fredlundi) was discovered by a local outfitter named Aaron Fredlund and described in the journal PLOS One by Richard McCrea et al. An examination of the trackway found no evidence of one trackway being left long after another had been made, further supporting the hypothesis that three individual tyrannosaurs were traveling together as a group. Further research revealed the animals were traveling at a speed of between 3.9 and 5.2 mph (6.3 and 8.4 km/h) and likely had a hip height of around 7 to 9 feet. As three different genera of tyrannosaurids (Gorgosaurus, Daspletosaurus, and Albertosaurus, respectively) are known from the formation, it is unknown which genus was the maker of the trackway. Additional evidence in the form of a bone-bed from the Rainbows and Unicorns Quarry in Southern Utah's Kaiparowits Formation described in 2021 attributed to Teratophoneus suggests other tyrannosaurids were also social animals. The fossils, consisting of four or possibly five different animals ranging from 4–22 years of age, suggest a mass mortality event, possibly caused by flooding, or less likely by cyanobacterial toxicosis, fire, or drought. The fact that all of the animals preserved seemed to have perished within a short timespan further strengthens the argument for gregarious behavior in tyrannosaurids, with the bone beds of such genera as Teratophoneus, Albertosaurus, Tyrannosaurus and Daspletosaurus showcasing suggested social behavior may have been widespread amongst tyrannosauridae in general.

=== Feeding ===
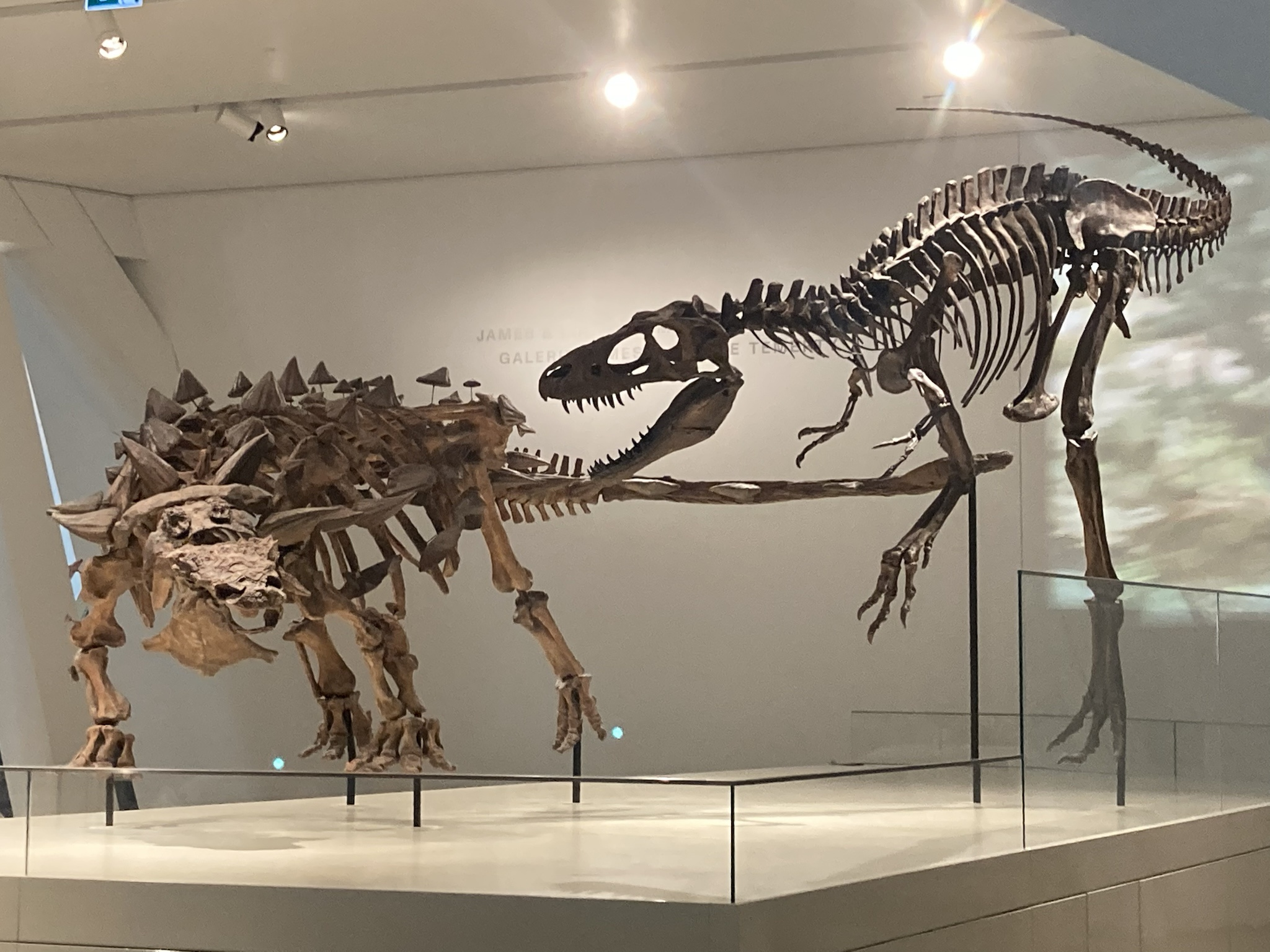
Gorgosaurus mounted as attacking a Zuul

Tyrannosaur tooth marks are the most commonly preserved feeding traces of carnivorous dinosaurs. They have been reported from ceratopsians, hadrosaurs and other tyrannosaurs. Tyrannosaurid bones with tooth marks represent about 2% of known fossils with preserved tooth marks. Tyrannosaurid teeth were used as holdfasts for pulling meat off a body, rather than knife-like cutting functions. Tooth wear patterns hint that complex head shaking behaviors may have been involved in tyrannosaur feeding.

Speculation on the pack-hunting habits of Albertosaurus were made by a few researchers who suggest that the younger members of the pack may have been responsible for driving their prey towards the adults, who were larger and more powerful, but also slower. Juveniles may also have had different lifestyles than adults, filling predator niches between those of the enormous adults and the smaller contemporaneous theropods, the largest of which were two orders of magnitude smaller than an adult Albertosaurus in mass. However, as the preservation of behavior in the fossil record is exceedingly rare, these ideas cannot readily be tested. Phil Currie speculates that the Daspletosaurus formed packs to hunt, although this cannot be stated with certainty. There is no evidence of such gregarious behavior in Gorgosaurus.

The debate about whether Tyrannosaurus was a predator or a pure scavenger is as old as the debate about its locomotion. Lambe (1917) described a good skeleton of Tyrannosaurus's close relative Gorgosaurus and concluded that it and therefore also Tyrannosaurus was a pure scavenger, because the Gorgosaurus's teeth showed hardly any wear. This argument is no longer taken seriously, because theropods replaced their teeth quite rapidly. Ever since the first discovery of Tyrannosaurus most scientists have agreed that it was a predator, although like modern large predators it would have been happy to scavenge or steal another predator's kill if it had the opportunity.

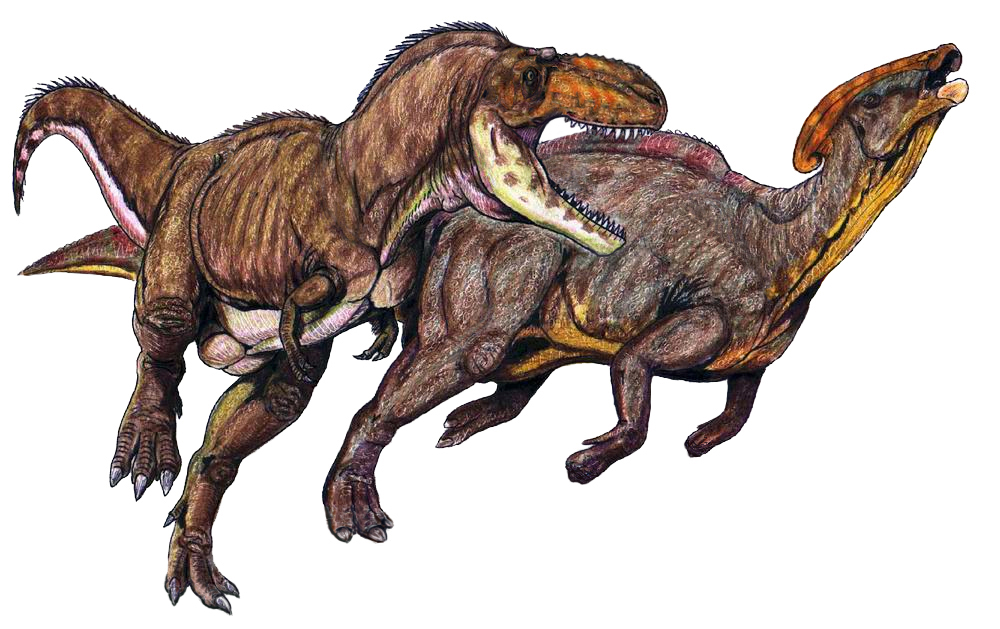
Teratophoneus curriei attacking a Parasaurolophus cyrtocristatus

Noted hadrosaur expert Jack Horner is currently the major advocate of the idea that Tyrannosaurus was exclusively a scavenger and did not engage in active hunting at all. Horner has presented several arguments to support the pure scavenger hypothesis. The presence of large olfactory bulbs and olfactory nerves suggests a highly developed sense of smell for sniffing out carcasses over great distances. The teeth could crush bone, and therefore could extract as much food (bone marrow) as possible from carcass remnants, usually the least nutritious parts. At least some of its potential prey could move quickly, while evidence suggests that Tyrannosaurus walked instead of ran.

Other evidence suggests hunting behavior in Tyrannosaurus. The eye-sockets of tyrannosaurs are positioned so that the eyes would point forward, giving them binocular vision slightly better than that of modern hawks. Tyrannosaur-inflicted damage has been found on skeletons of hadrosaurs and Triceratops that seemed to have survived initial attacks. Some researchers argue that if Tyrannosaurus were a scavenger, another dinosaur had to be the top predator in the Amerasian Upper Cretaceous. The top prey were the larger marginocephalians and ornithopods. The other tyrannosaurids share so many characteristics with Tyrannosaurus that only small dromaeosaurs remain as feasible top predators. In this light, scavenger hypothesis adherents have suggested that the size and power of tyrannosaurs allowed them to steal kills from smaller predators.

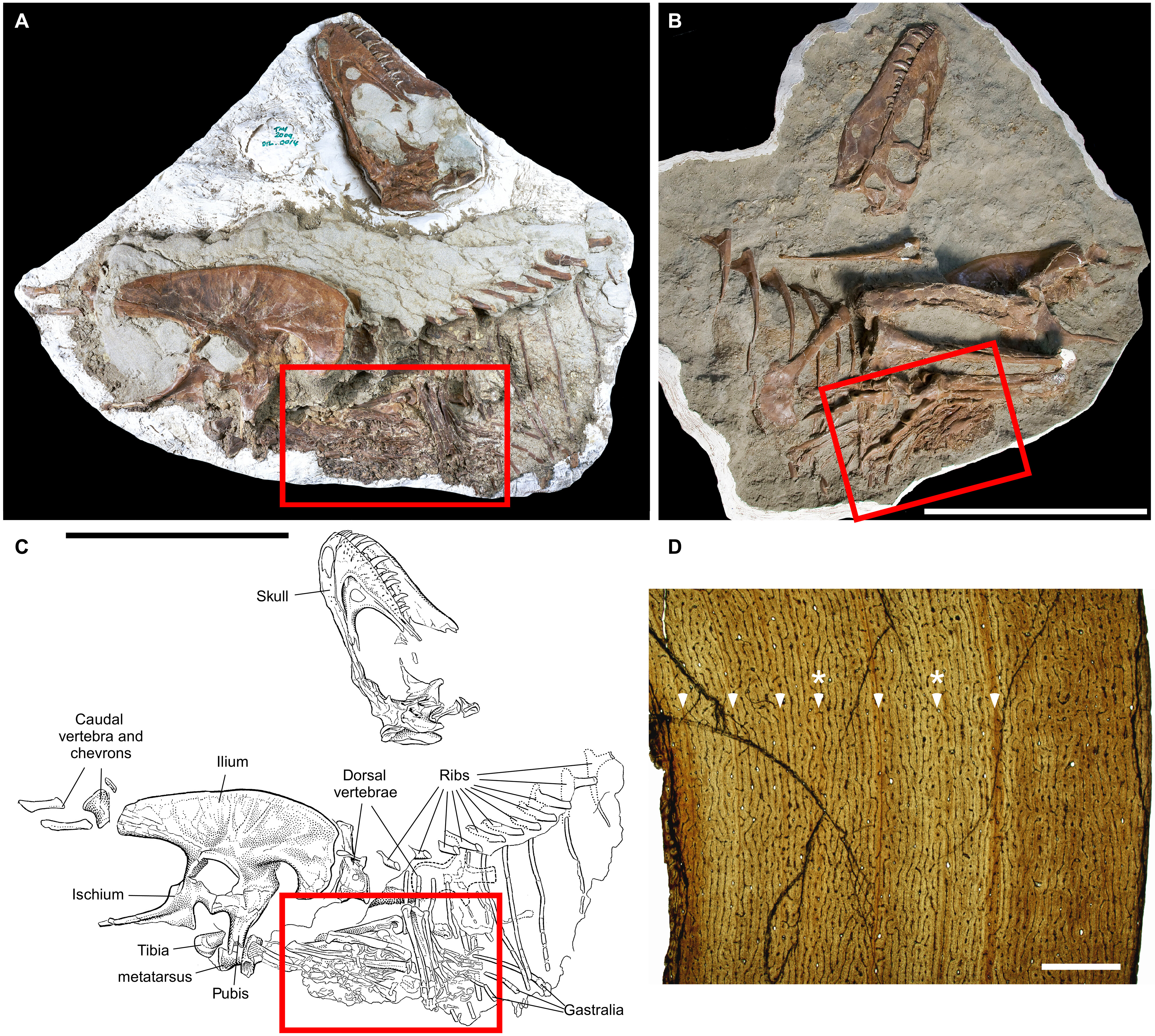
Gorgosaurus juvenile specimen TMP 2009.12.14, featuring stomach contents comprising remains of Citipes

In 2023, a juvenile Gorgosaurus with its in situ stomach contents containing two Citipes juveniles about a year old intact has been reported from the Dinosaur Park Formation. This juvenile would have been 5–7 years old at the time of death, measuring about 4 metres (13 ft) long and weighing around 335 kilograms (739 lb). It is much larger than the two Citipes juveniles that weigh about 9–12 kilograms (20–26 lb), contrary to the assumption that tyrannosaurids fed on prey of their size once they reached 16–32 kilograms (35–71 lb), indicating that juvenile tyrannosaurids still consumed much smaller prey after exceeding a certain size threshold. The discovery of this specimen indicated that tyrannosaurids probably did not hunt in multigenerational packs, since its prey size is too small to share with the conspecifics. It is also a direct dietary evidence that reinforces the theory of 'ontogenetic dietary shift' for tyrannosaurids, as previously inferred by ecological modeling and anatomical features among different age groups. Only the remains of the hindlimbs and caudal vertebrae of juvenile Citipes were present in the tyrannosaurid's stomach cavity, suggesting that a juvenile Gorgosaurus may have had preferential consumption of the muscular hindlimbs.

A tyrannosaurid metatarsal from the Campanian-aged Judith River Formation shows bite marks indicative of scavenging from a smaller tyrannosaur also shows that size-asymmetric feeding behaviour between tyrannosaurids took place.

Toothmarks on hadrosaur hind limb bones from the Aguja Formation that were described in 2026 suggest tyrannosaurids may have routinely dismembered carcasses and stripped all meat from less nutritious areas such as the ankles and feet. While scavenging cannot be ruled out, the same feeding behavior has been documented on other fossils in formations where tyrannosaurids are present, suggesting this was typical tyrannosaur feeding behavior.

==== Cannibalism ====
Evidence also strongly suggests that tyrannosaurids were at least occasionally cannibalistic. Tyrannosaurus itself has strong evidence pointing towards it having been cannibalistic in at least a scavenging capacity based on tooth marks on the foot bones, humerus, and metatarsals of one specimen. Fossils from the Fruitland Formation, Kirtland Formation (both Campanian in age), and Maastichtian-aged Ojo Alamo Formation suggest that cannibalism was present in various tyrannosaurid genera of the San Juan Basin. The evidence gathered from the specimens suggests opportunistic feeding behavior in tyrannosaurids that cannibalized members of their own species. A tyrannosaurid from the Judith River Formation has been discovered with bite traces showing it was fed on by a younger conspecific or a member of a closely related species.

=== Distribution ===
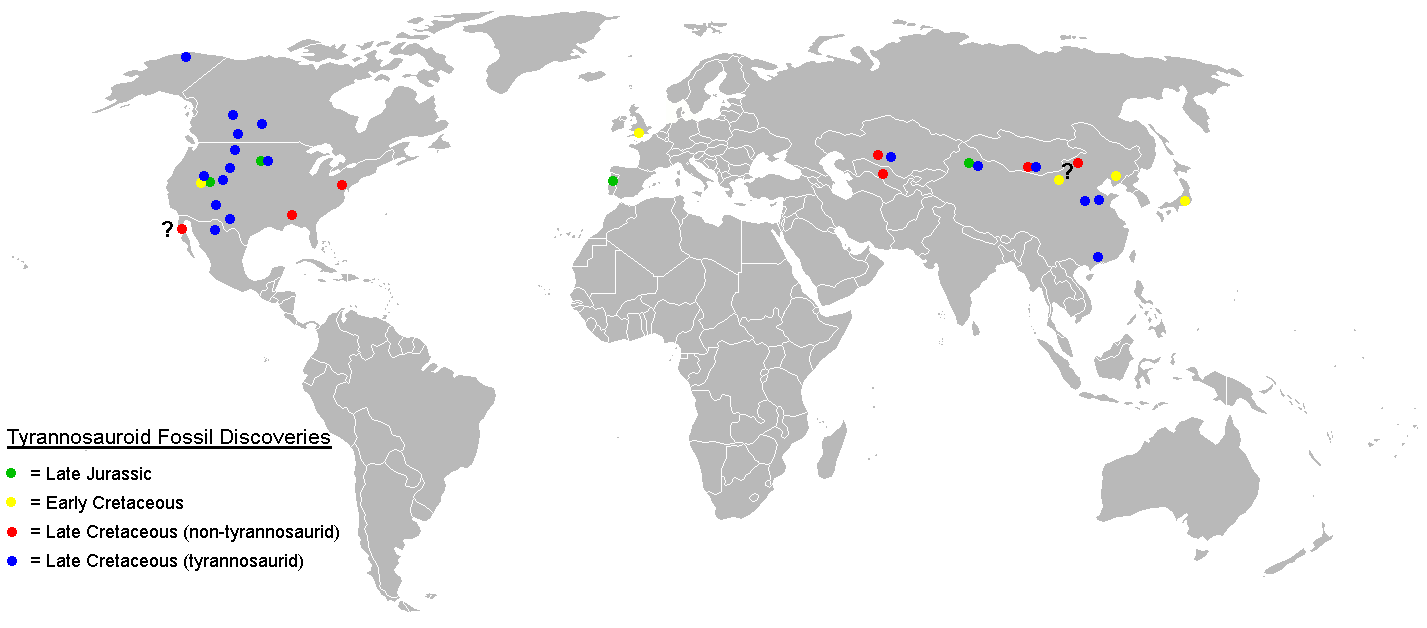
While earlier tyrannosauroids are found on all three northern continents, with possible remains from Australia, tyrannosaurid fossils (blue dots) are known only from North America and Asia

The earliest known tyrannosaur remains occurred between 129.4 and 125 million years ago in Ishikawa, Japan near Lat 36.166668 lng 136.633331. Found by Marsh in 1881 and identified by H.F. Osborne in 1906, the age of the remains was determined by H. Matsuoka et al. in 2002.

While earlier tyrannosauroids are found on all three northern continents, tyrannosaurid fossils are known only from North America and Asia. Sometimes fragmentary remains uncovered in the Southern Hemisphere have been reported as "Southern Hemisphere tyrannosaurids," although these seem to have been misidentified abelisaurid fossils.

Tyrannosaurid remains have never been recovered from eastern North America, while more basal tyrannosauroids, like Dryptosaurus and Appalachiosaurus, persisted there until the end of the Cretaceous, indicating that tyrannosaurids must have evolved in or dispersed into western North America after the continent was divided in half by the Western Interior Seaway in the middle of the Cretaceous. Tyrannosaurid fossils have been found in Alaska, which may have provided a route for dispersal between North America and Asia. Alioramus and Tarbosaurus are found to be related in one cladistic analysis, forming a unique Asian branch of the family. This was later disproven with the discovery of Qianzhousaurus and the description of the tyrannosaur family Alioramini. Tyrannosaurid teeth from a large species of unknown variety were discovered in the Nagasaki Peninsula by researchers from the Fukui Prefectural Dinosaur Museum, further expanding the range of the group. The teeth were estimated to be 81 million years old (Campanian Age).

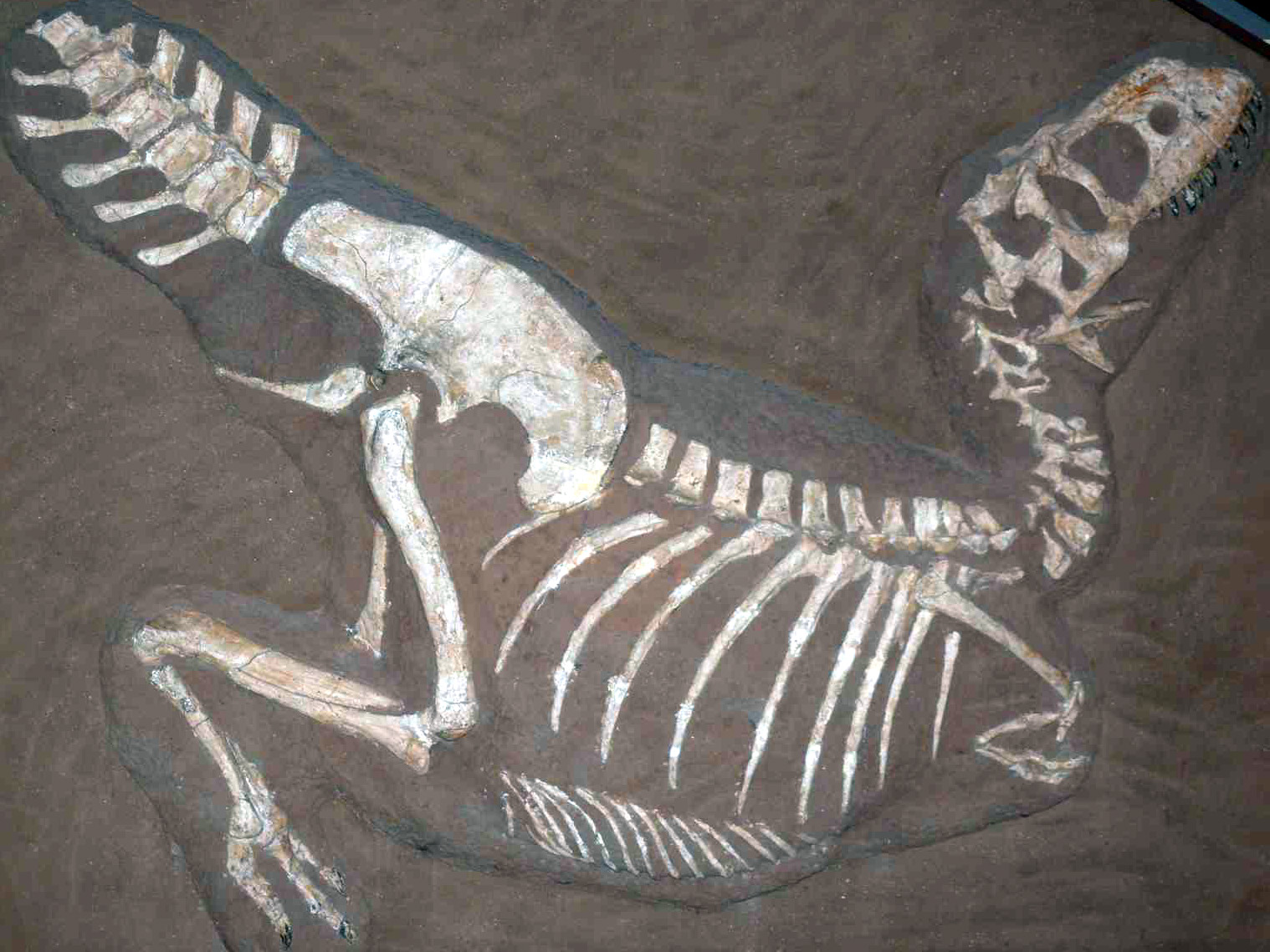
Skeleton cast of Tarbosaurus bataar, a tyrannosaurid from Asia

Of the two subfamilies, tyrannosaurines appear to have been more widespread. Albertosaurines are unknown in Asia, which was home to the tyrannosaurines, such as Tarbosaurus and Zhuchengtyrannus, and Qianzhousaurus and Alioramus of the Alioramini. Both the Tyrannosaurinae and Albertosaurinae subfamilies were present in the Campanian and early Maastrichtian stages of North America, with tyrannosaurines like Daspletosaurus ranging throughout the Western Interior, while the albertosaurines Albertosaurus and Gorgosaurus are currently known only from the northwestern part of the continent.

By the late Maastrichtian, albertosaurines appear to have gone extinct, while the tyrannosaurine Tyrannosaurus roamed from Saskatchewan to Texas. This pattern is mirrored in other North American dinosaur taxa. During the Campanian and early Maastrichtian, lambeosaurine hadrosaurs and centrosaurine ceratopsians are common in the northwest, while hadrosaurines and chasmosaurines were more common to the south. By the end of the Cretaceous, centrosaurines are unknown and lambeosaurines are rare, while hadrosaurines and chasmosaurines were common throughout the Western Interior. A study published in the journal Scientific Reports on 2 February 2016, by Steve Brusatte, Thomas Carr et al. indicates that during the later Maastrichtian, Tyrannosaurus itself might have been partially responsible for the extinction of the other tyrannosaurids in most of western North America. The study indicates that Tyrannosaurus might have been an immigrant from Asia as opposed to having evolved in North America (possibly a descendant of the closely related Tarbosaurus) that supplanted and outcompeted other tyrannosaurids. This theory is further supported by the fact that few to no other types of tyrannosaurid are found within Tyrannosaurus' known range. This could be called into question with the confirmation of Nanotyrannus being a distinct genus and sharing the same range as Tyrannosaurus. Likewise, one of the proposals listed by Zanno and Napoli in their description of Nanotyrannus suggests that Nannotyrannus itself may have originated in Appalachia, suggesting non-tyrannosaurid tyrannosauroids may have been able to coexist with tyrannosaurids by occupying different niches.

== See also ==
- Timeline of tyrannosaur research
