= Snout–vent length =

Morphometric measurement used in herpetology

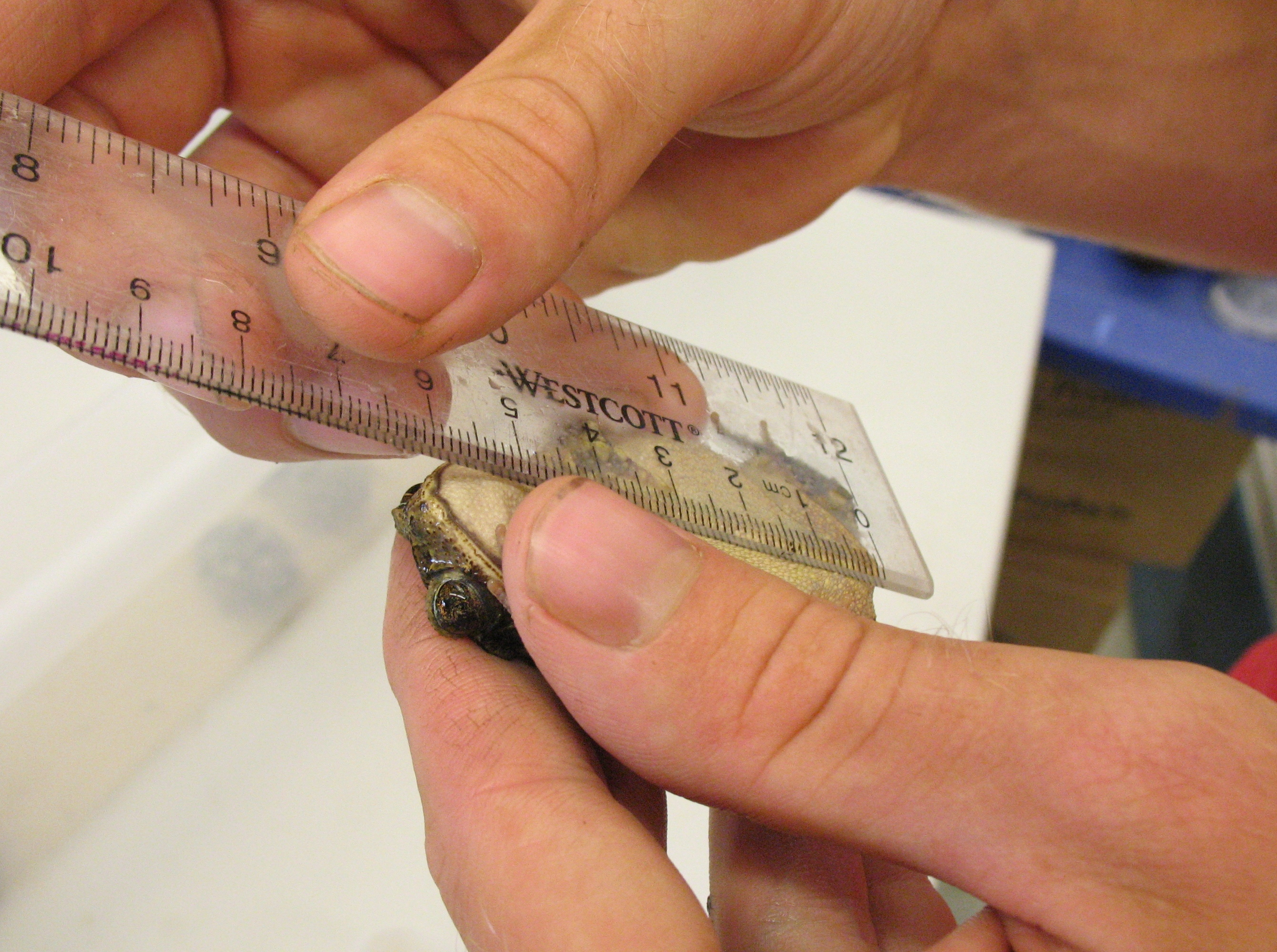
A female frog being measured for snout vent length.

Snout–vent length (SVL) is a morphometric measurement taken in herpetology from the tip of the snout to the most posterior opening of the cloacal slit (vent). It is the most common measurement taken in herpetology, being used for all amphibians, lepidosaurs, and crocodilians (for turtles, carapace length (CL) and plastral length (PL) are used instead).

The SVL differs depending on whether the animal is struggling or relaxed (if alive), or various other factors if it is a preserved specimen. For fossils, an osteological correlate such as precaudal length must be used. When combined with weight and body condition, SVL can help deduce age and sex. Because tails are often missing or absent, especially in juveniles, SVL is seen as more invariant than total length. Even in the case of crocodiles, tail tips may be missing.

Various devices are used to position the animal while the measurement is being taken, such as a snake tube, "Mander Masher", or a "Salamander Stick".
