= Osteological correlate =

Osteological correlates are marks on the bones of animals that are made from the causal interactions of the soft-tissue and underlying bone. The most classic osteological correlates in animal anatomy are the muscle scars and bony processes seen on the bones of animals. These structures are caused from the pull of the muscles on the underlying bone. This pull places strain on the underlying bone, stimulating the formation of thicker bone in these regions and producing the underlying structures.
