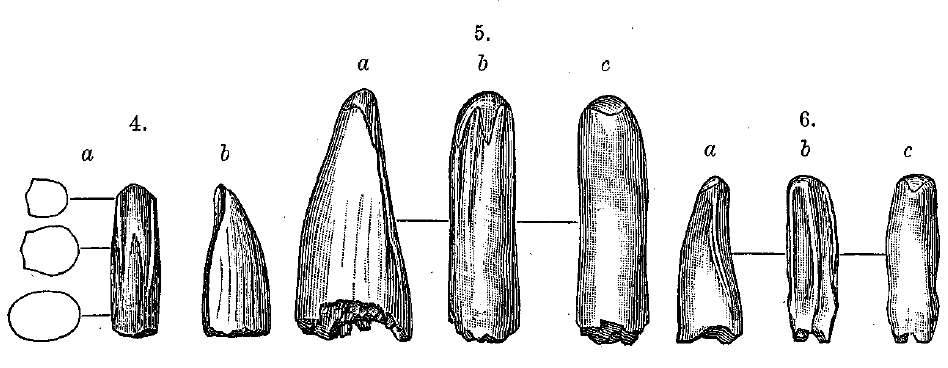
- Illustrations of the teeth by Leidy and O. C. Marsh, 4: A. mirandus 5: "A." amplus 6: "A." cristatus

Scientific classification
- Kingdom: Animalia
- Phylum: Chordata
- Class: Reptilia
- Clade: Dinosauria
- Clade: Saurischia
- Clade: Theropoda
- Superfamily: †Tyrannosauroidea
- Clade: †Eutyrannosauria
- Family: †Tyrannosauridae
- Subfamily: †Aublysodontinae; Nopcsa, 1928 nomen dubium
- Genus: †Aublysodon; Leidy, 1868 nomen dubium

Type species
- †Aublysodon mirandus Leidy, 1868

Species
- †A. mirandus Leidy, 1868 nomen dubium; †A. cristatus? Marsh, 1892 nomen dubium; and see text

Synonyms
- Ornithomimus mirandus (Leidy, 1868) Hay, 1930

= Aublysodon =

Aublysodon Temporal range: Late Campanian, 75 Ma

Extinct genus of dinosaurs

Aublysodon (“backwards-flowing tooth") is a dubious genus of carnivorous dinosaurs known only from the Judith River Formation in Montana, which has been dated to the late Campanian age of the late Cretaceous period (about 75 million years ago).

The only currently recognized species, Aublysodon mirandus, was named by paleontologist Joseph Leidy in 1868. It is sometimes considered dubious now because the type specimen consists only of an isolated premaxillary (front) tooth. Although this specimen is now lost, similar teeth have been found in many US states, western Canada, and Asia. These teeth almost certainly belong to juvenile tyrannosaurine tyrannosaurids, but most have not been identified to species level. However, it is likely that the type tooth (and therefore the name A. mirandus itself) belongs to one of the species in the genus Daspletosaurus, which was present in contemporary formations, and which matches specific details of the original tooth.

The synapomorphies alleged to distinguish the Aublysodontinae, especially lack of serrations on premaxillary teeth, could have been caused by tooth wear in life, postmortem abrasion, or digestion. Most other "aublysodontine"-type teeth may be from ontogenetic stages or sexual morphs of other tyrannosaurids. Apart from the type species A. mirandus, several other species have been named over the years. These are now all considered either dubious, identical to other species, or even as having no close connection to A. mirandus.

== History ==
In the mid-to-late 19th century many dinosaur taxa were named for isolated teeth; such genera include Trachodon, Palaeoscincus, and Troodon. Even before the badlands of North America started revealing the bones of Tyrannosaurus, teeth turning up in many localities in the Western United States revealed the presence of large predatory dinosaurs.

In 1856 Joseph Leidy had named fourteen teeth collected by Ferdinand Vandeveer Hayden in 1854 and 1855 from the Judith River Badlands of Montana as the species Deinodon horridus. In 1866 Edward Drinker Cope chose three nonserrated teeth from the original syntype series of fourteen as the lectotypes of Deinodon horridus. Leidy named these same three teeth Aublysodon mirandus in 1868. The meaning of the generic name is uncertain because Leidy himself gave no etymology or explanation of the intended meaning. It is possible the genus name is derived from Greek αὖ, au, "again", "backwards", "contrariwise", βλύζω, blyzo, "to spout", "to flow" and ὀδών, odon, "tooth". The specific name means "wonderful" or "strange" in Latin.

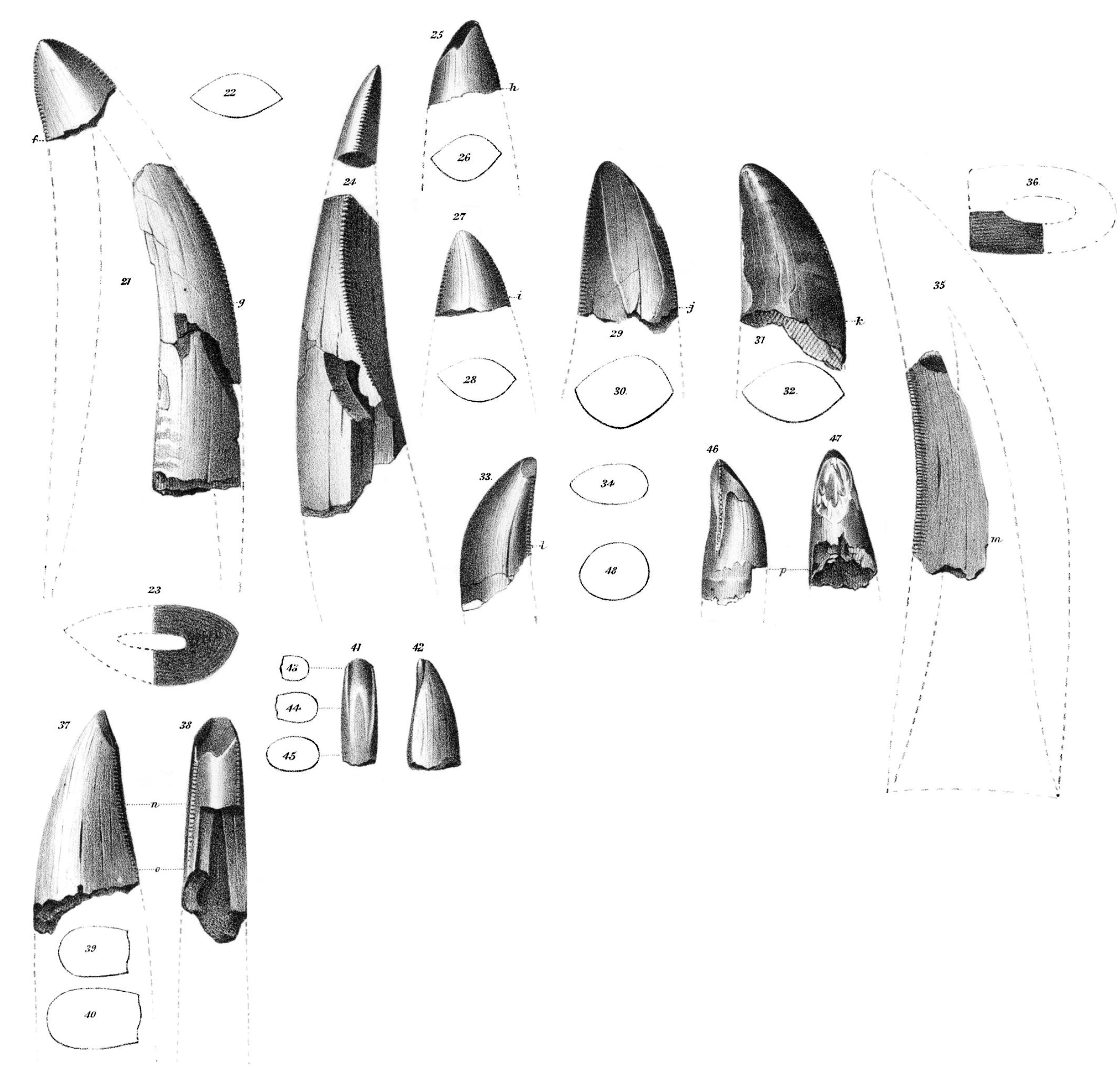
Lithography of the original syntypes of Deinodon: the small tooth shown in figures 41-45 is ANSP 9535, the later lectotype of Aublysodon mirandus. Figures 37-40 show ANSP 9533, and figures 33 and 34 specimen ANSP 9534, the later lectotypes of Deinodon horridus

Because the name Aublysodon mirandus was based on the same type, it was at first a junior objective synonym of Deinodon horridus, which latter name thus had priority. Cope in 1868 mistakenly thought the name Deinodon was preoccupied by the snake Dinodon and renamed Deinodon horridus into an Aublysodon horridus. If Deinodon really had been preoccupied, this would have made Aublysodon a valid genus. In 1899 Oliver Perry Hay pointed out Cope's mistake; Aublysodon horridus is a junior objective synonym of Deinodon horridus, just as Aublysodon mirandus had been. However, in 1892 Aublysodon became an independent genus when Othniel Charles Marsh further limited its type by choosing a single small nonserrated premaxillary tooth with a D-shaped cross-section, specimen ANSP 9535, as the lectotype of Aublysodon mirandus. The two other teeth, ANSP 9533 and ANSP 9534, remained as the lectotypes of Deinodon horridus. The names were thus separated.

The tooth-based taxon Aublysodon was a mystery for a long time since no further skeletal elements were found that could be assigned with certainty to the teeth. In the early twentieth century it was assumed by some workers that it represented a member of the Ornithomimidae when it was not yet known this group was toothless. Lawrence Morris Lambe in 1902 referred the tooth to Struthiomimus; Hay in 1930 renamed A. mirandus into Ornithomimus mirandus, forgetting in that case Aublysodon would have priority.

Today it is known that similar teeth are found in juvenile specimens of Daspletosaurus, and it is likely that teeth referred to Aublysodon came from that genus. In October 2000, the type specimen of Aublysodon went missing when being sent by registered mail from the Academy of Natural Sciences of Philadelphia to the Field Museum of Natural History. Because of the presence of Aublysodon-type teeth in other juvenile tyrannosaurines than Daspletosaurus, such as those of Tyrannosaurus, remains of which can also be found in Montana, Thomas Carr no longer considered the name to represent a real biological taxon, but to be a nomen dubium.

=== Referred species ===
Apart from Aublysodon mirandus and A. horridus several other species have been named within the genus. In 1876 Cope created an Aublysodon lateralis, based on specimen AMNH 3956, a tooth of a juvenile tyrannosaur which has been synonymized with Deinodon horridus. In 1892 Marsh named two more species: Aublysodon amplus and Aublysodon cristatus, respectively based on teeth YPM 296 and YPM 297; the latter has also been placed in the genus Deinodon. They may represent teeth from juvenile individuals of T. rex as they were found in the Maastrichtian Lance Formation. In 1903 John Bell Hatcher renamed Laelaps explanatus Cope 1876 into an Aublysodon explanatus. This probably represents a tooth of Saurornitholestes. In 1932 Friedrich von Huene classified a fragmentary skeleton named Ornithomimus grandis by Marsh in 1890 as Aublysodon grandis, but most later researchers have considered this a synonym of the Campanian tyrannosaur Deinodon horridus. In 1967 Alan Jack Charig named three species: Aublysodon lancinator, Aublysodon novojilovi and Aublysodon lancensis; these had originally been species of Gorgosaurus. The first two are today seen as juvenile specimens of Tarbosaurus; the last represents either a juvenile individual of Tyrannosaurus or a separate genus Nanotyrannus.

The first skeletal material referred to an original Aublysodon species was a partial skull unearthed in Jordan, Montana in 1966 and described by Ralph Molnar in 1977/1978. The skull, specimen LACM 28741 at forty-five centimetres the length of an average human arm, bore pointed teeth attached to a long narrow snout. First thought to be a juvenile Tyrannosaurus, then interpreted as a large dromaeosaurid, this "Jordan theropod" was given the name Aublysodon molnaris by Gregory S. Paul in 1988; in 1990 the name was by Paul emended to Aublysodon molnari, applying the correct genitive. It was made a separate genus Stygivenator by George Olshevsky in 1995, but was later, in 2004, reinterpreted to be a juvenile Tyrannosaurus rex by Thomas Carr and Tom Williamson. Another partial skeleton from New Mexico, specimen OMNH 10131, was in 1990 considered to represent Aublysodon, but later research by Thomas Carr and Tom Williamson first referred it to Daspletosaurus and ultimately to Bistahieversor. In 1988 Paul also created another species when renaming Shanshanosaurus huoyanshanensis Dong 1977 into Aublysodon huoyanshanensis. It probably represents a Tarbosaurus specimen.

== Classification ==
Cope assigned Aublysodon to the Goniopoda in 1870, a group roughly equivalent to the modern Theropoda. Marsh however, in 1892 was misled by the small size of the teeth, their D-shaped cross-section and their lack of serrations into considering Aublysodon a mammal exceptionally large for the Cretaceous. By the early twentieth century it was again generally understood that Aublysodon was a theropod reptile; later it would be typically assigned to the Deinodontidae, a group today called the Tyrannosauridae.

Aublysodon was by Paul in 1988 thought to belong to a unique subfamily of tyrannosaurids called the Aublysodontinae, a name already coined, together with an Aublysodontidae, by Franz Nopcsa in 1928. This was a concept which afterwards enjoyed some popularity: Thomas Holtz proposed a stem clade definition of the Aublysodontinae in 2001, "Aublysodon and all taxa sharing a more recent common ancestor with it than with Tyrannosaurus".

Aublysodon was for a time also used in definitions of higher-level taxa. Holtz proposed a node clade definition of the Tyrannosauridae in 2001 as "all descendants of the most recent common ancestor of Tyrannosaurus and Aublysodon", using Aublysodon as an anchor taxon. Paul Sereno has also used Aublysodon as an anchor taxon for the Tyrannosauridae, although his definition was problematic for other reasons. These concepts have now been redefined without the dubious name.

Because Aublysodon is today considered a nomen dubium based on material probably belonging to Daspletosaurus, its affiliations are likely tyrannosaurid and the terms Aublysodontinae and Aublysodontidae have become irrelevant.

== See also ==
- Timeline of tyrannosaur research
