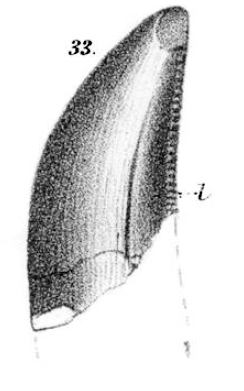
- Lectotype tooth of D. horridus (specimen ASNP 9534)

Scientific classification
- Kingdom: Animalia
- Phylum: Chordata
- Class: Reptilia
- Clade: Dinosauria
- Clade: Saurischia
- Clade: Theropoda
- Superfamily: †Tyrannosauroidea
- Family: †Tyrannosauridae
- Subfamily: †Deinodontinae; Cope, 1866 emend Brown, 1914 sensu Matthew and Brown, 1922
- Genus: †Deinodon; Leidy, 1856

Type species
- †Deinodon horridus Leidy, 1856

Synonyms
- Megalosaurus horridus (Leidy, 1856) Leidy, 1857; Aublysodon horridus (Leidy, 1856) Cope, 1868; Aublysodon lateralis Cope, 1876; Dryptosaurus kenabekides Hay, 1899; Deinodon lateralis (Cope, 1876) Hay, 1902; Deinodon kenabekides (Hay, 1899) Olshevsky, 1995

= Deinodon =

Deinodon Temporal range: Late Cretaceous, 77 Ma

Extinct genus of dinosaurs

Deinodon (Greek for "terrible tooth") is a dubious genus of tyrannosaurid dinosaur containing a single species, Deinodon horridus, which is known only from a set of teeth found in the Late Cretaceous Judith River Formation of Montana and named by paleontologist Joseph Leidy in 1856. These were the first tyrannosaurid remains to be described and had been collected by Ferdinand Vandeveer Hayden. The teeth of Deinodon were slightly heterodont, and the holotype of Aublysodon can probably be assigned to the former.

== History and classification ==
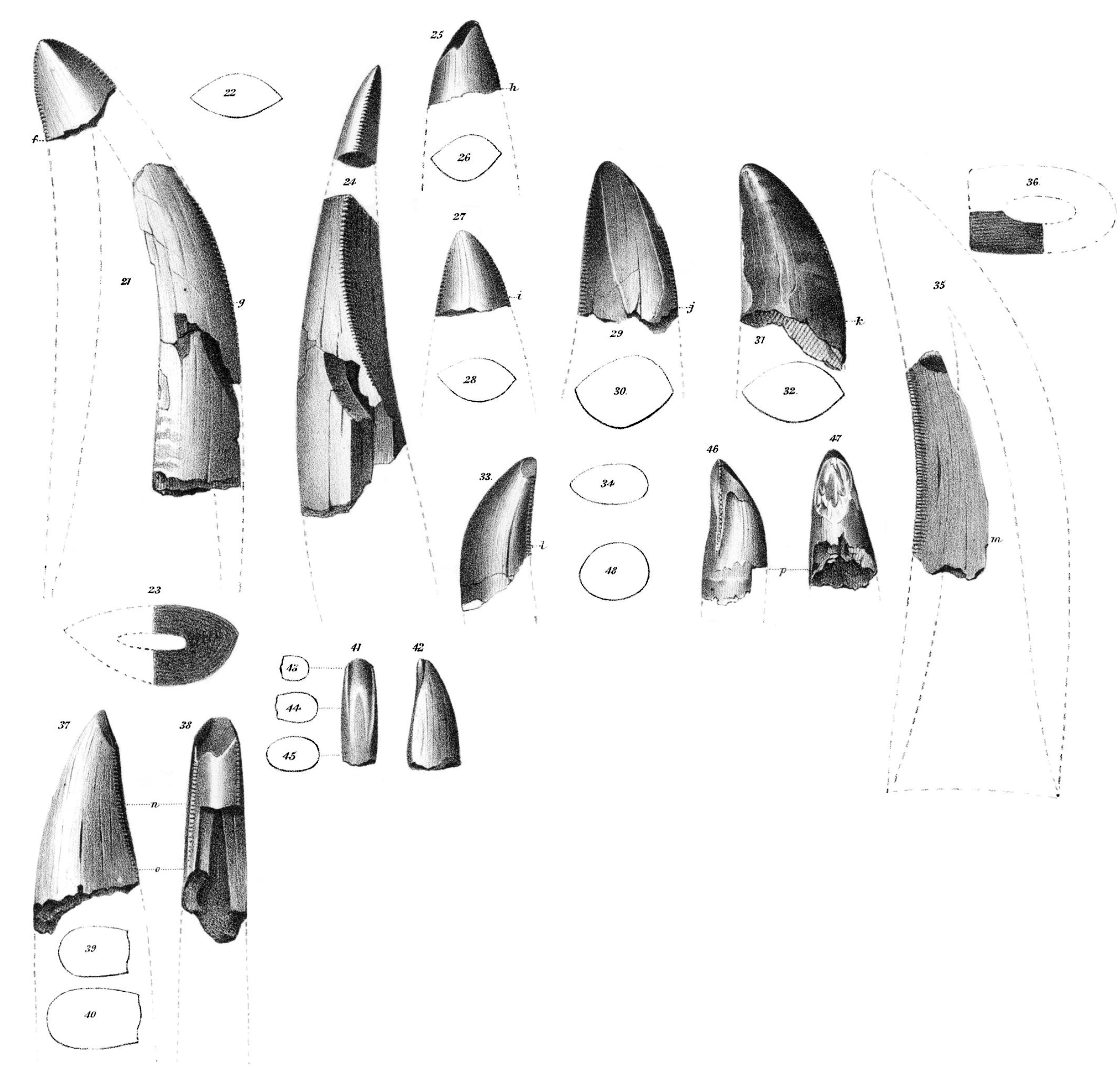
Teeth assigned by Leidy

It is likely that the fossilized teeth of D. horridus belonged to the dinosaur later identified as Gorgosaurus libratus. In a 1922 study, William Diller Matthew & Barnum Brown found that the teeth of D. horridus and G. libratus were indistinguishable from each other, and that they almost certainly belonged to the same species. However, because D. horridus was not yet known from any skeletal remains, they refrained from formally declaring them to be synonyms. In a 1970 review, Dale Russell stated that because the teeth of D. horridus could not be distinguished from either G. libratus or his newly described species Daspletosaurus torosus, it must be considered a nomen vanum ("empty name"). Since Russell published his opinion, most researchers have regarded Deinodon as a nomen dubium, though some have argued that since Deinodon and Gorgosaurus cannot be distinguished, they should be synonymized with D. horridus as the valid name for "Gorgosaurus" skeletons. Additionally, several researchers have agreed that the genus Aublysodon (including the species A. mirandus and A. lateralis), should also be considered a synonym of Deinodon, since it is based on incisor teeth that likely come from the same animal. Lambe (1902) went further, and said that as originally named, Deinodon was not preoccupied, and instead, regarded Aublysodon as a nomen nudum.

== Description ==
Deinodon is known from a few, slightly heterodont teeth.

A few phalanges, and a metatarsal with fragments of others, were found to be possibly assignable to D. horridus by Lambe in 1902.

== List of species and synonyms ==
Numerous species were referred to the genus Deinodon in the past. However, because most researchers now consider the genus and its type species nomina dubia, any additional species referred to the genus cannot be supported.

Name	Author	Year	Combination author	Combination year	Status	Notes
Deinodon horridus	Leidy	1856	Leidy	1856	Nomen dubium, type species	
Deinodon explanatus	Cope	1876	Lambe	1902	Reclassified as Dromaeosaurus explanatus nomen dubium	Originally Laelaps explanatus
Deinodon falculus	Cope	1876	Osborn	1902	Reclassified as Dromaeosaurus falculus nomen dubium	Originally Laelaps falculus
Deinodon incrassatus	Cope	1876	Osborn	1902	Nomen dubium	Originally Laelaps incrassatus
Deinodon lateralis	Cope	1876	Hay	1902	Synonym of Deinodon horridus	Originally Aublysodon lateralis
Deinodon cristatus	Cope	1877	Osborn	1902	Synonym of Troodon formosus	Originally Laelaps cristatus
Deinodon hazenianus	Cope	1877	Osborn	1902	Nomen dubium	Originally Laelaps hazenianus
Deinodon laevifrons	Cope	1877	Osborn	1902	Reclassified as Dromaeosaurus laevifrons	Originally Laelaps laevifrons
Deinodon amplus	Marsh	1892	Hay	1902	Reclassified as Aublysodon amplus	Originally Aublysodon amplus
Deinodon cristatus	Marsh	1892	Hay	1902	Reclassified as Aublysodon cristatus	Originally Aublysodon cristatus
Deinodon grandis	Marsh	1890	Osborn	1916	Synonym of Deinodon horridus	Originally Ornithomimus grandis
Deinodon sarcophagus	Osborn	1905	Matthew & Brown	1922	Reclassified as Albertosaurus sarcophagus	Originally Albertosaurus sarcophagus
Deinodon libratus	Lambe	1914	Matthew & Brown	1922	Synonym of Gorgosaurus libratus	Originally Gorgosaurus libratus
Deinodon arctunguis	Parks	1928	Kuhn	1939	Synonym of Albertosaurus sarcophagus	Originally Albertosaurus arctunguis
Deinodon novojilovi	Maleev	1955	Maleev	1964	Synonym of Tarbosaurus bataar	Originally Gorgosaurus novojilovi
Deinodon sternbergi	Matthew & Brown	1923	Kuhn	1965	Synonym of Gorgosaurus libratus	Originally Gorgosaurus sternbergi
Deinodon periculosus	Riabinin	1930	Kuhn	1965	Synonym of Tarbosaurus periculosus	Originally Albertosaurus periculosus
Deinodon lancensis	Gilmore	1946	Kuhn	1965	Reclassified as Nanotyrannus lancensis	Originally Gorgosaurus lancensis
Deinodon lancinator	Maleev	1955	Kuhn	1965	Synonym of Tarbosaurus bataar	Originally Gorgosaurus lancinator
Deinodon kenabekides	Hay	1899	Olshevsky	1995	Synonym of Deinodon horridus	Originally Dryptosaurus kenabekides

== See also ==
- Timeline of tyrannosaur research
