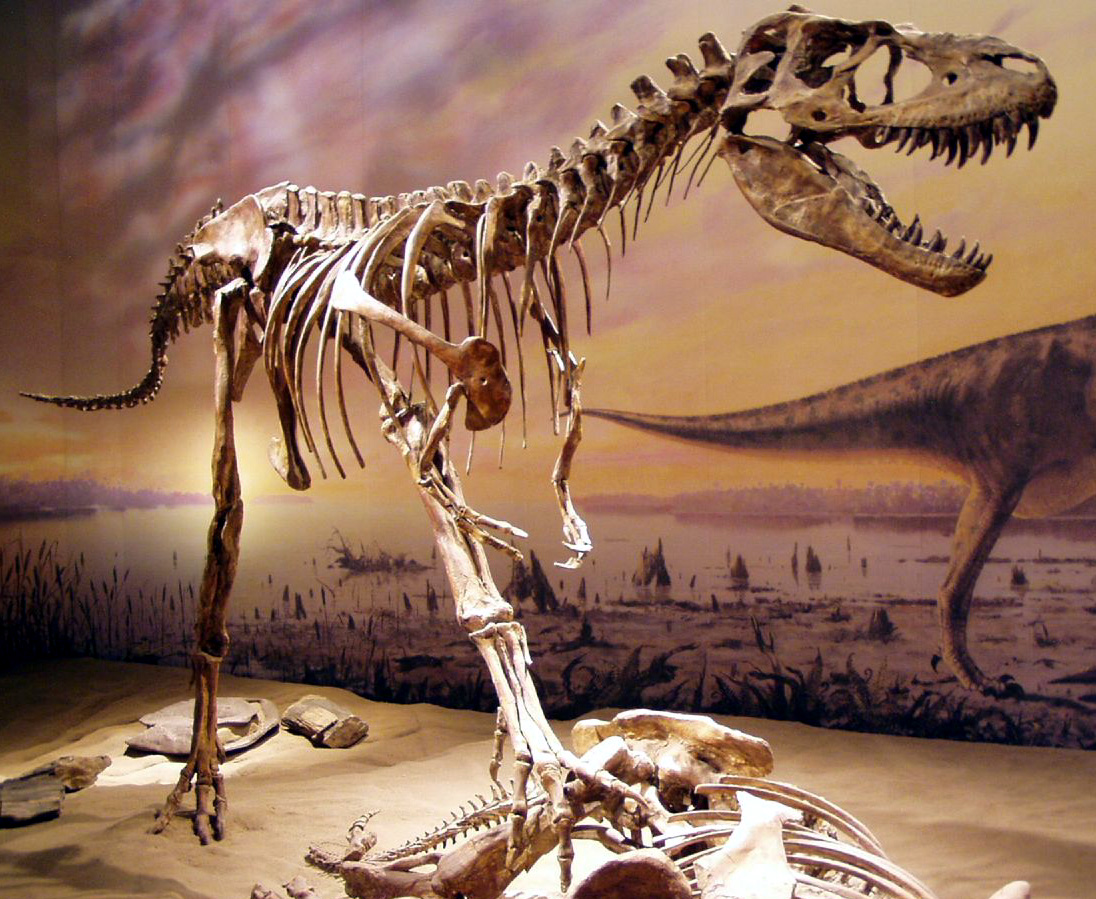
- Skeletal mount, Royal Tyrrell Museum of Palaeontology

Scientific classification
- Kingdom: Animalia
- Phylum: Chordata
- Class: Reptilia
- Clade: Dinosauria
- Clade: Saurischia
- Clade: Theropoda
- Superfamily: †Tyrannosauroidea
- Clade: †Eutyrannosauria
- Family: †Tyrannosauridae
- Subfamily: †Albertosaurinae
- Genus: †Gorgosaurus; Lambe, 1914

Type species
- †Gorgosaurus libratus Lambe, 1914

Synonyms
- List: Deinodon horridus? Leidy, 1856; Megalosaurus (Deinodon) horridus? (Leidy, 1856) Leidy, 1857; Aublysodon horridus? (Leidy, 1856) Cope, 1868; Laelaps falculus? Cope, 1876; Dryptosaurus falculus? (Cope, 1876) Hay, 1902; Deinodon falculus? (Cope, 1876) Osborn, 1902; Dromaeosaurus falculus? (Cope, 1876) Olshevsky, 1978; Laelaps hazenianus? Cope, 1876; Dryptosaurus hazenianus? (Cope, 1876) Hay, 1902; Deinodon hazenianus? (Cope, 1876) Osborn, 1902; Laelaps incrassatus Cope, 1876; Dryptosaurus incrassatus (Cope, 1876) Hay, 1902; Deinodon incrassatus (Cope, 1876) Osborn, 1902; Albertosaurus incrassatus (Cope, 1876) von Huene, 1932; Dryptosaurus kenabekides? Hay, 1899; Deinodon kenabekides? (Hay, 1899) Olshevsky, 1995; Deinodon libratus (Lambe, 1914) Matthew & Brown, 1922; Gorgosaurus "sternbergi" Matthew & Brown, 1922 (nomen nudum); Gorgosaurus sternbergi Matthew & Brown, 1923; Deinodon sternbergi (Matthew & Brown, 1923) Kuhn, 1965; Albertosaurus libratus (Lambe, 1914) Russell, 1970; Albertosaurus sternbergi (Matthew & Brown, 1923) Russell, 1970

= Gorgosaurus =

Gorgosaurus Temporal range: Late Cretaceous (Campanian), c. 76.5–73 Ma

Genus of tyrannosaur dinosaur

Gorgosaurus (/ˌɡɔːrɡəˈsɔːrəs/ GOR-gə-SOR-əs; lit. 'dreadful lizard') is a genus of tyrannosaurid theropod dinosaur that lived in western North America during the Late Cretaceous Period (Campanian), between about 76.5 and 73 million years ago. Fossil remains have been found in Western Canada as well as the U.S. state of Montana. Paleontologists recognize only the type species, G. libratus, although other species have been erroneously referred to the genus.

Like most known tyrannosaurids, Gorgosaurus was a large bipedal predator, measuring 8–9 metres (26–30 ft) in length and 2–3 metric tons (2.2–3.3 short tons) in body mass. Dozens of large, sharp teeth lined its jaws, while its two-fingered forelimbs were comparatively small. Gorgosaurus was most closely related to Albertosaurus, and more distantly related to the larger Tyrannosaurus. Gorgosaurus and Albertosaurus are extremely similar, distinguished mainly by subtle differences in the teeth and skull bones. Some experts consider G. libratus to be a species of Albertosaurus; this would make Gorgosaurus a junior synonym of that genus.

Gorgosaurus lived in a lush floodplain environment along the edge of an inland sea. It was an apex predator, preying upon abundant ceratopsids and hadrosaurs. In some areas, Gorgosaurus coexisted with another tyrannosaurid, Daspletosaurus. Although these animals were roughly the same size, there is some evidence of niche differentiation between the two. Gorgosaurus is the best-represented tyrannosaurid in the fossil record, known from dozens of specimens. These plentiful remains have allowed scientists to investigate its ontogeny, life history and other aspects of its biology.

== Discovery and naming ==
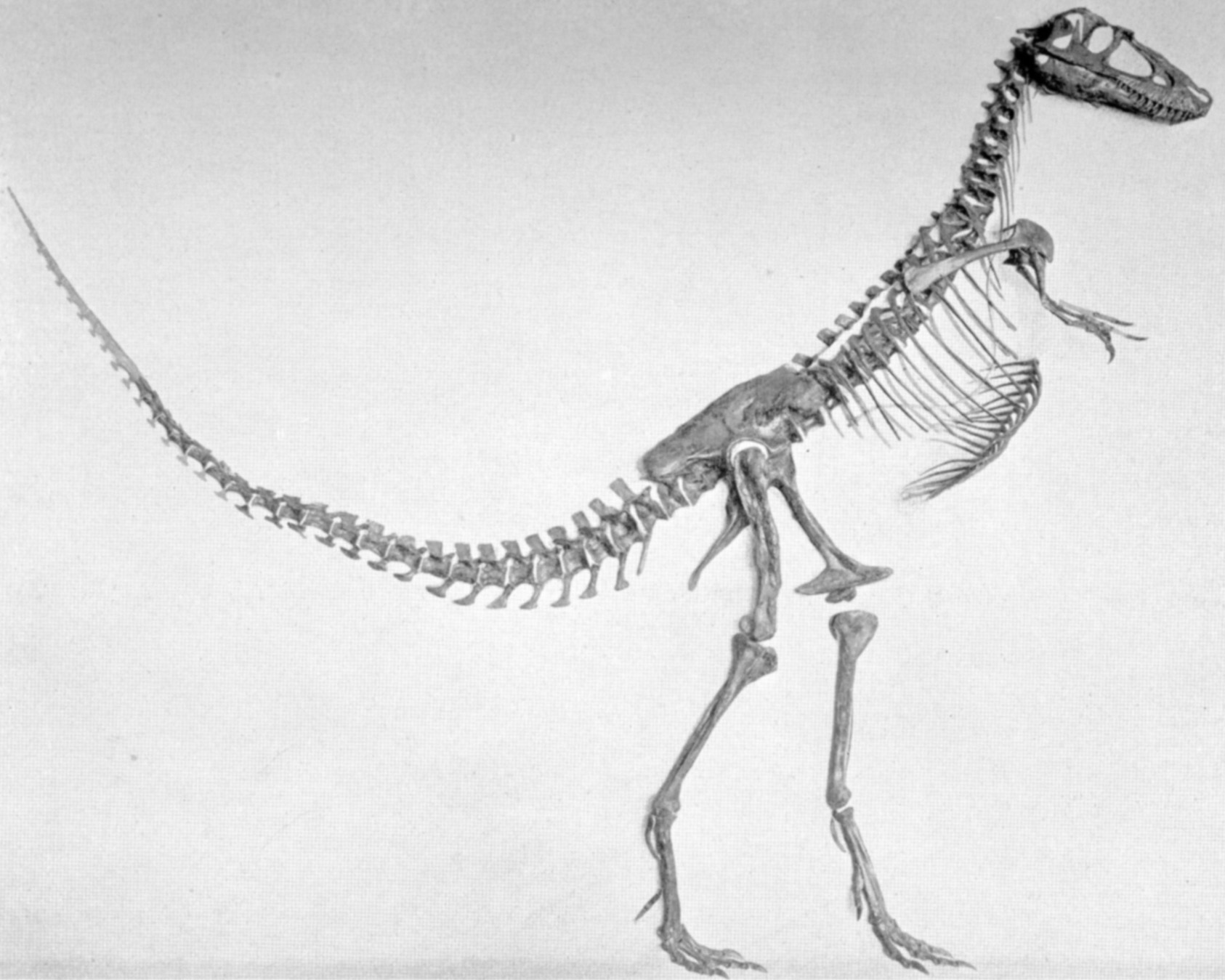
Type specimen of Gorgosaurus sternbergi (AMNH 5664), now recognized as a juvenile Gorgosaurus libratus

Gorgosaurus libratus was first described by Lawrence Lambe in 1914. Its name is derived from the Greek γοργος (gorgos – "fierce" or "terrible") and σαυρος (saurus – "lizard"). The type species is G. libratus; the specific epithet "balanced" is the past participle of the Latin verb librare, meaning "to balance".

The holotype of Gorgosaurus libratus (NMC 2120) is a nearly complete skeleton associated with a skull, discovered in 1913 by Charles M. Sternberg. This specimen was the first tyrannosaurid found with a complete hand. It was found in the Dinosaur Park Formation of Alberta and is housed in the Canadian Museum of Nature in Ottawa. Prospectors from the American Museum of Natural History in New York City were active along the Red Deer River in Alberta at the same time, collecting hundreds of spectacular dinosaur specimens, including four complete G. libratus skulls, three of which were associated with skeletons. Matthew and Brown described four of these specimens in 1923.

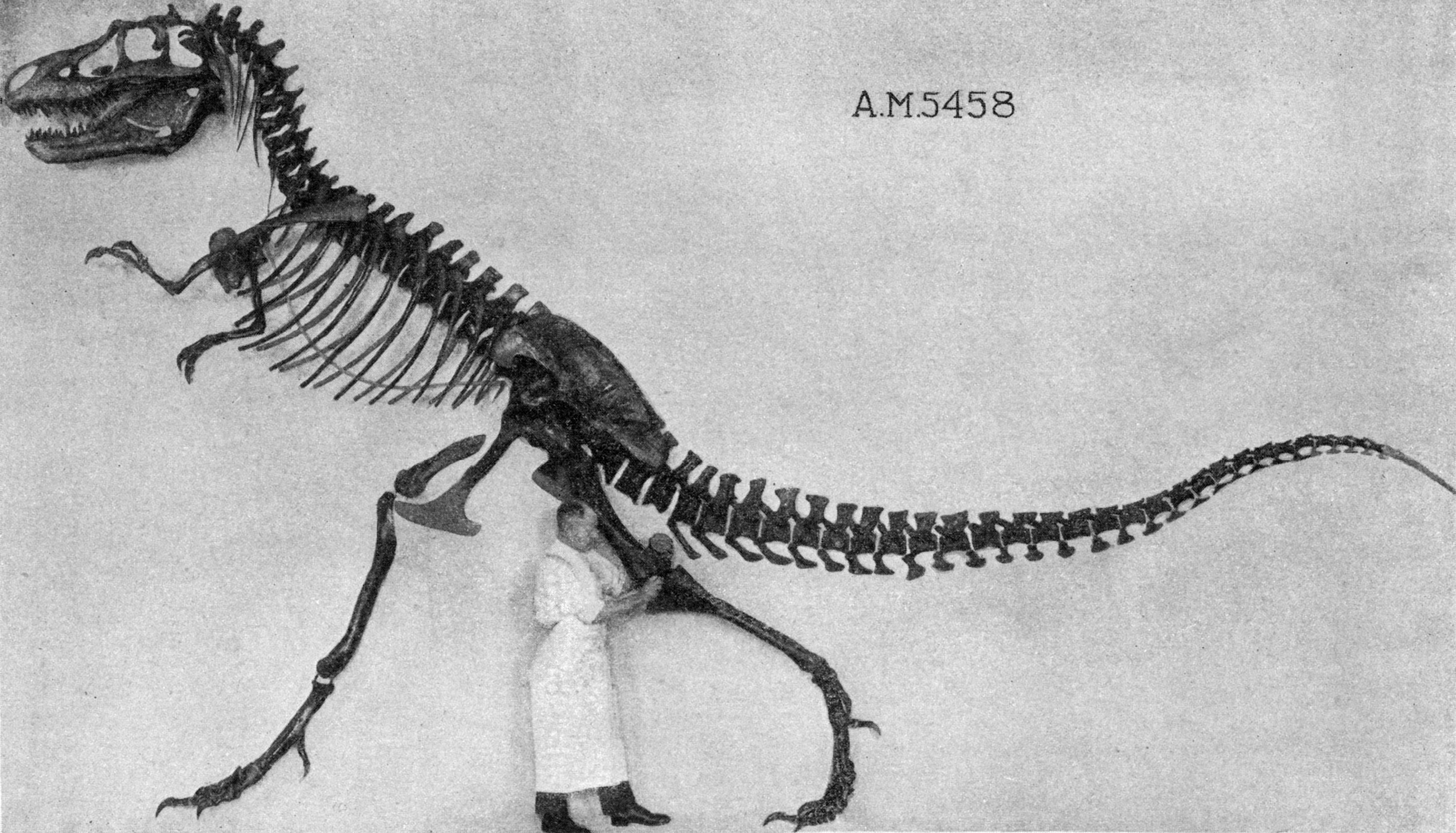
Specimen AMNH 5458

Matthew and Brown also described a fifth skeleton (AMNH 5664), which Charles H. Sternberg had collected in 1917 and sold to their museum. It was smaller than other Gorgosaurus specimens, with a lower, lighter skull and more elongate limb proportions. Many sutures between bones were unfused in this specimen as well. Matthew and Brown noted that these features were characteristic of juvenile tyrannosaurids, but still described it as the holotype of a new species, G. sternbergi. Today's paleontologists regard this specimen as a juvenile G. libratus. Dozens of other specimens have been excavated from the Dinosaur Park Formation and are housed in museums across the United States and Canada. G. libratus is the best-represented tyrannosaurid in the fossil record, known from a virtually complete growth series.

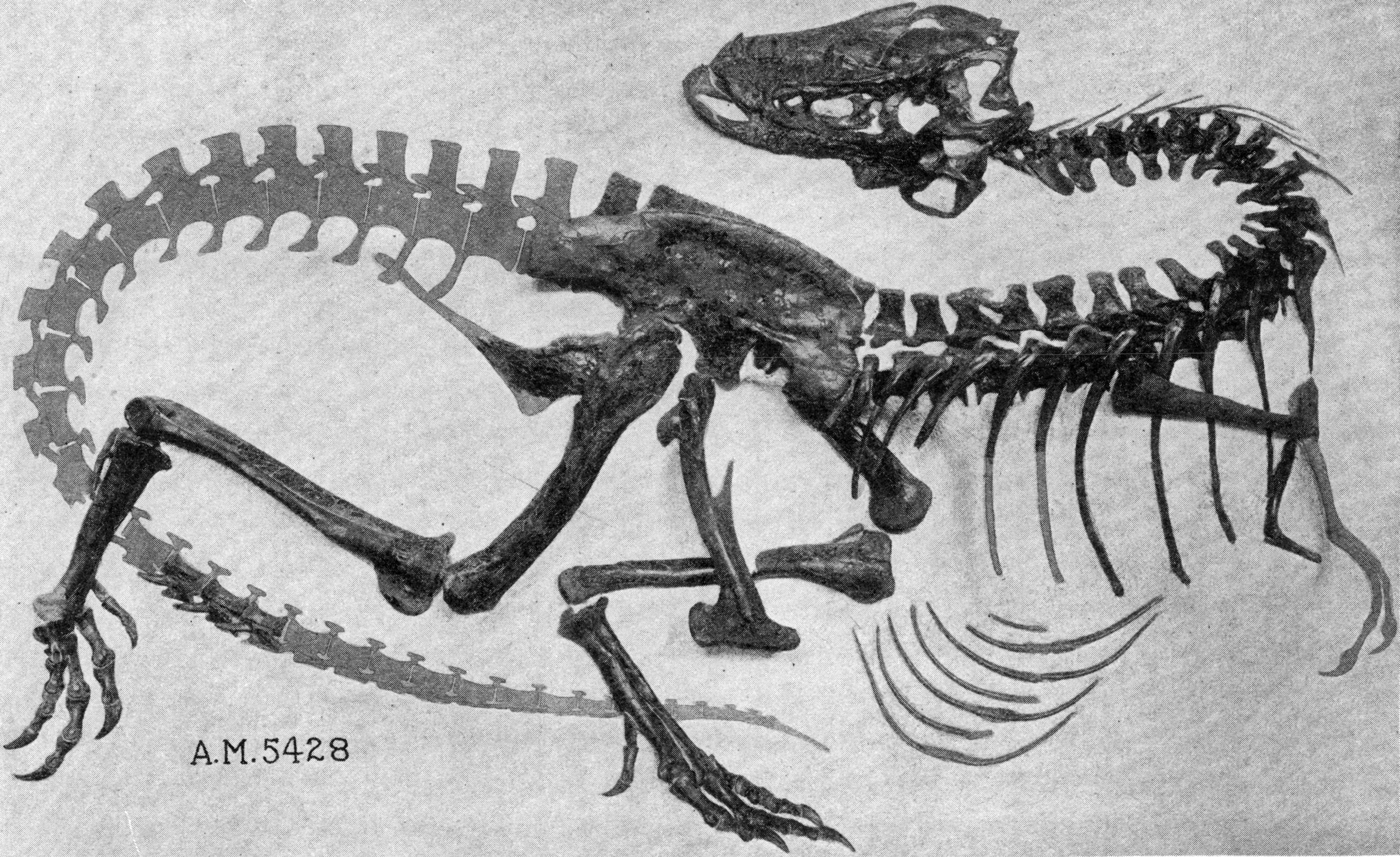
Specimen USNM 12814 (formerly AMNH 5428)

In 1856, Joseph Leidy described two tyrannosaurid premaxillary teeth from Montana. Although there was no indication of what the animal looked like, the teeth were large and robust, and Leidy gave them the name Deinodon. Matthew and Brown commented in 1922 that these teeth were indistinguishable from those of Gorgosaurus, but in the absence of skeletal remains of Deinodon, opted not to unequivocally synonymize the two genera, provisionally naming a ?Deinodon libratus. Although Deinodon teeth are very similar to those of Gorgosaurus, tyrannosaurid teeth are extremely uniform, so it cannot be said for certain which animal they belonged to. Deinodon is usually regarded as a nomen dubium today. Additional likely synonyms of G. libratus and/or D. horridus include Laelaps falculus, Laelaps hazenianus, Laelaps incrassatus, and Dryptosaurus kenabekides.

Several tyrannosaurid skeletons from the Two Medicine Formation and Judith River Formation of Montana probably belong to Gorgosaurus, although it remains uncertain whether they belong to G. libratus or a new species. One specimen from Montana (TCMI 2001.89.1), housed in the Children's Museum of Indianapolis, shows evidence of severe pathologies, including healed leg, rib, and vertebral fractures, osteomyelitis (infection) at the tip of the lower jaw resulting in permanent tooth loss, and possibly a brain tumor.

=== Formerly assigned species ===
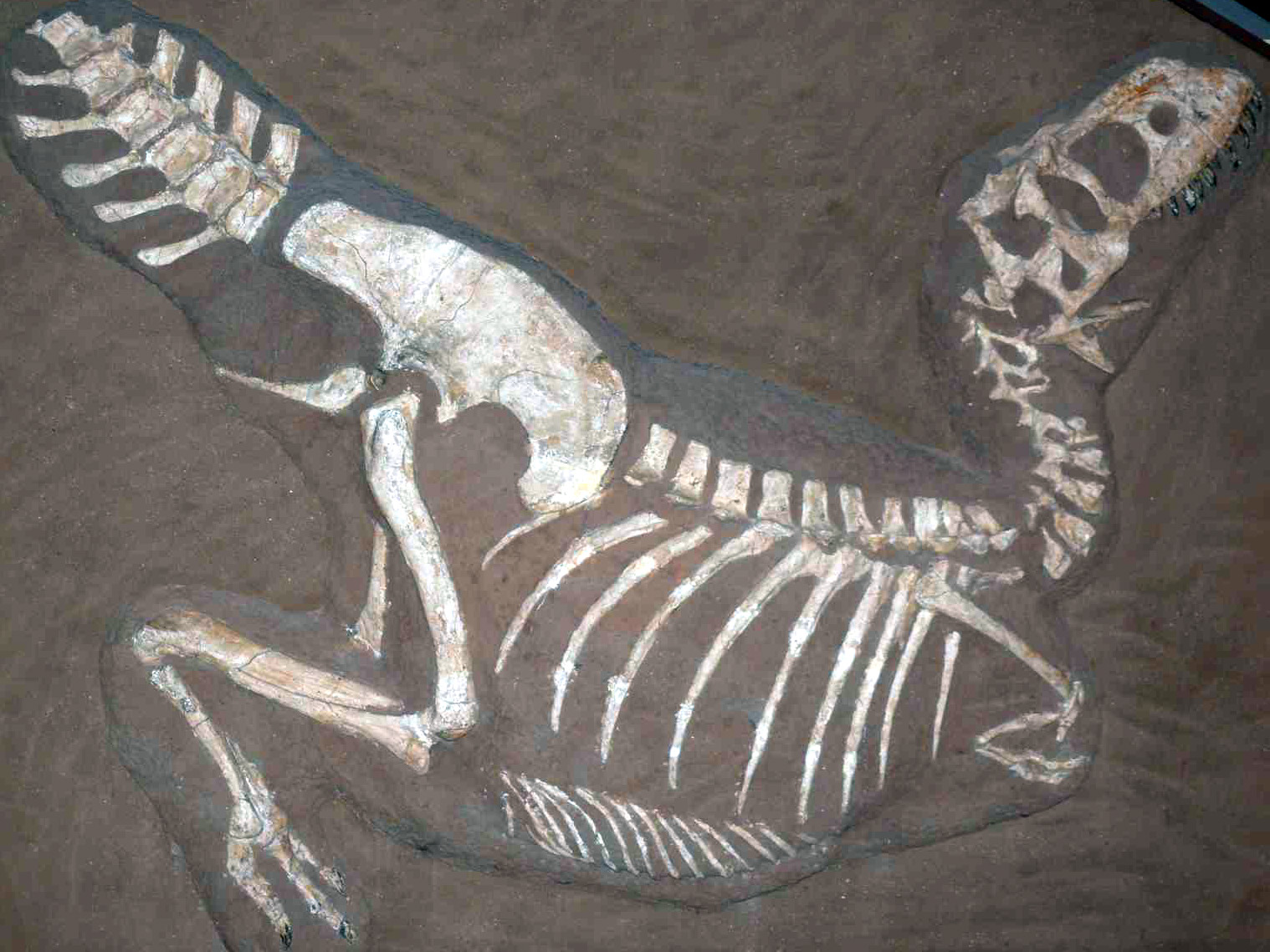
Cast of specimen PIN 553–1, holotype of now invalid Gorgosaurus lancinator

Several species were incorrectly assigned to Gorgosaurus in the 20th century. A complete skull of a small tyrannosaurid (CMNH 7541), found in the younger, late Maastrichtian-age Hell Creek Formation of Montana, was named Gorgosaurus lancensis by Charles Whitney Gilmore in 1946. This specimen was renamed Nanotyrannus by Bob Bakker and colleagues in 1988. While many paleontologists once regarded Nanotyrannus as a juvenile Tyrannosaurus, it has since been recognized as a valid taxon. Similarly, Evgeny Maleev created the names Gorgosaurus lancinator and Gorgosaurus novojilovi for two small tyrannosaurid specimens (PIN 553-1 and PIN 552–2) from the Nemegt Formation of Mongolia in 1955. Kenneth Carpenter renamed the smaller specimen Maleevosaurus novojilovi in 1992, but both are now considered juveniles of Tarbosaurus bataar.

== Description ==
G. libratus adult and subadult with a human for scale

Gorgosaurus was smaller than Tyrannosaurus or Tarbosaurus, close in size to Albertosaurus. Adults reached 8 to 9 m (26 to 30 ft) in length from snout to tail, and weighed 2–3 metric tons (2.2–3.3 short tons) in body mass. The largest known skull measures 99 cm (39 in) long, just slightly smaller than that of Daspletosaurus. As in other tyrannosaurids, the skull was large compared to its body size, although chambers within the skull bones and large openings (fenestrae) between bones reduced its weight. Albertosaurus and Gorgosaurus share proportionally longer and lower skulls than Daspletosaurus and other tyrannosaurids. The end of the snout was blunt, and the nasal and parietal bones were fused along the midline of the skull, as in all other members of the family. The eye socket was circular rather than oval or keyhole-shaped as in other tyrannosaurid genera. A tall crest rose from the lacrimal bone in front of each eye, similar to Albertosaurus and Daspletosaurus. Differences in the shape of bones surrounding the brain set Gorgosaurus apart from Albertosaurus.

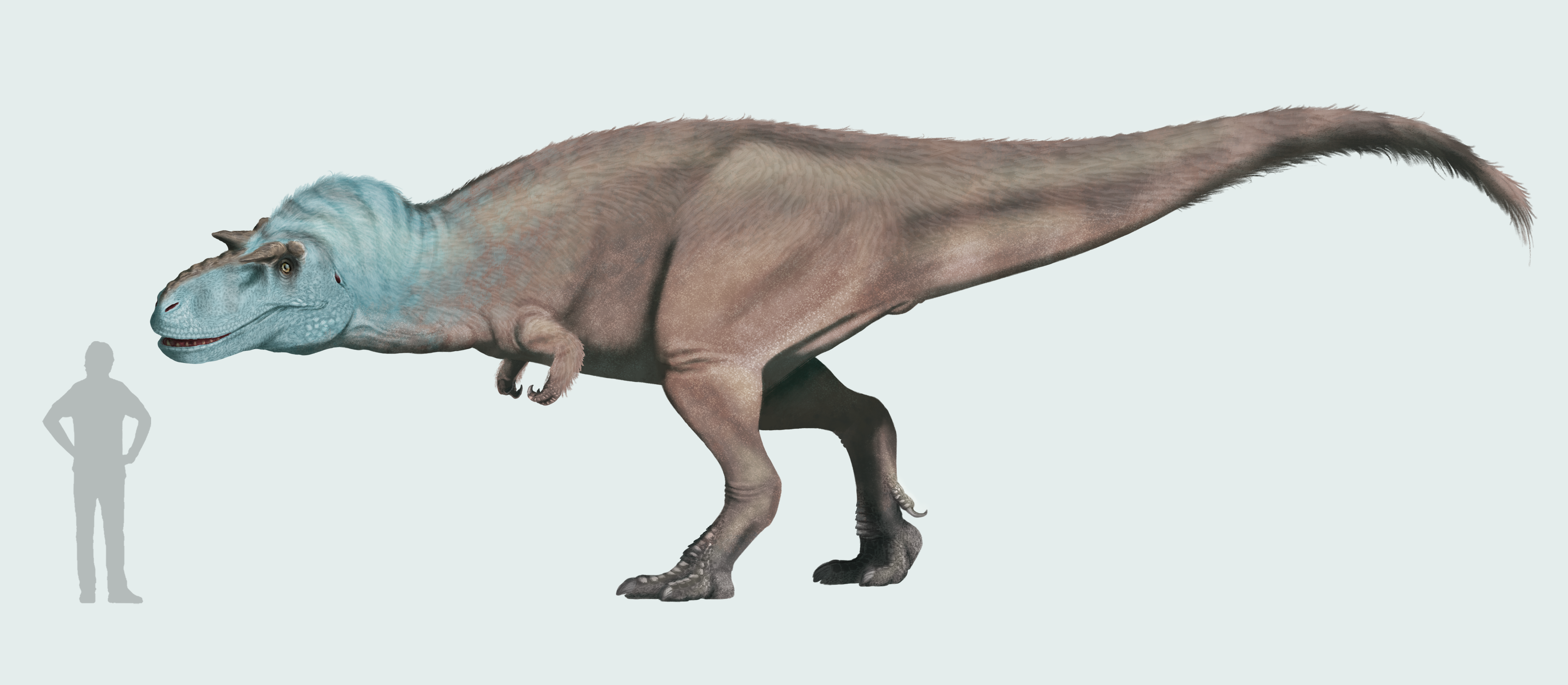
Life restoration

Gorgosaurus teeth were typical of all known tyrannosaurids. The eight premaxillary teeth at the front of the snout were smaller than the rest, closely packed and D-shaped in cross section. In Gorgosaurus, the first tooth in the maxilla was also shaped like the premaxillary teeth. The rest of the teeth were oval in cross section, rather than blade-like as in most other theropods. Along with the eight premaxillary teeth, Gorgosaurus had 26 to 30 maxillary teeth and 30 to 34 teeth in the dentary bones of the lower jaw. This number of teeth is similar to Albertosaurus and Daspletosaurus but is fewer than those of Tarbosaurus or Tyrannosaurus.

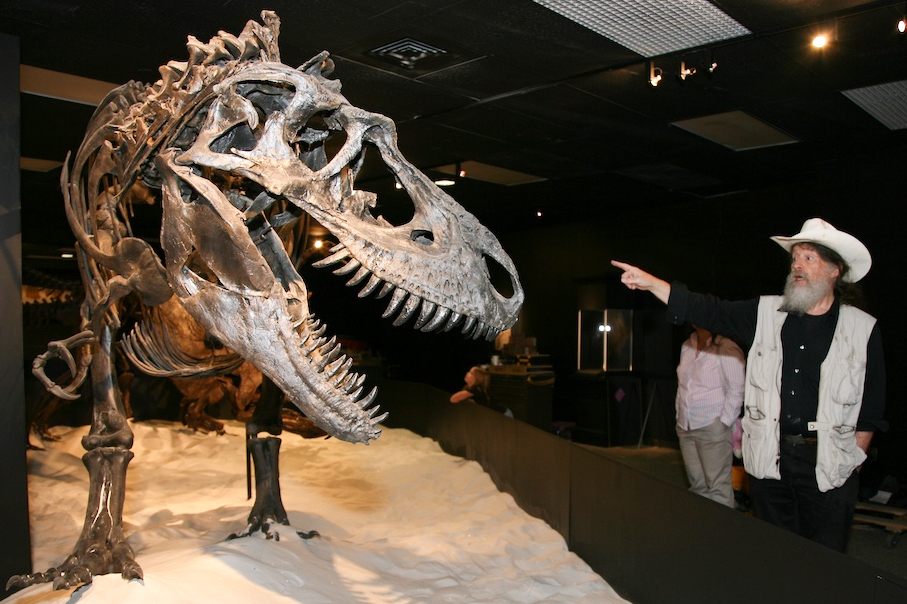
Bob Bakker and a skeleton with several bone injuries, from the "Dinosaur Mummy: CSI" exhibit at the HMNS

Gorgosaurus shared its general body plan with all other tyrannosaurids. Its massive head was perched on the end of an S-shaped neck. In contrast to its large head, its forelimbs were very small. The forelimbs had only two digits, although a third metacarpal is known in some specimens, the vestigial remains of the third digit seen in other theropods. Gorgosaurus had four digits on each hindlimb, including a small first toe (hallux) which did not contact the ground. Tyrannosaurid hindlimbs were long relative to overall body size compared with other theropods. The largest known Gorgosaurus femur measured 105 cm (41 in) long. In several smaller specimens of Gorgosaurus, the tibia was longer than the femur, a proportion typical of fast-running animals. The two bones were of equal length in the largest specimens. The long, heavy tail served as a counterweight to the head and torso and placed the center of gravity over the hips.

In 2001, paleontologist Phil Currie reported skin impressions from the holotype specimen of G. libratus. He originally reported the skin as being essentially smooth and lacking the scales found in other dinosaurs, similar to the secondarily featherless skin found in large modern birds. Scales of some sort were present in this specimen, but they are reportedly widely dispersed from each other and very small. Other patches of isolated Gorgosaurus skin shows denser, and larger though still relatively fine scales (smaller than hadrosaurid scales and approximately as fine as a Gila monster's). Neither of these specimens was associated with any particular bone or specific body area. In the Encyclopedia of Dinosaurs Kenneth Carpenter pointed out that traces of skin impressions from the tail of Gorgosaurus showed similar small rounded or hexagonal scales.

== Classification and systematics ==
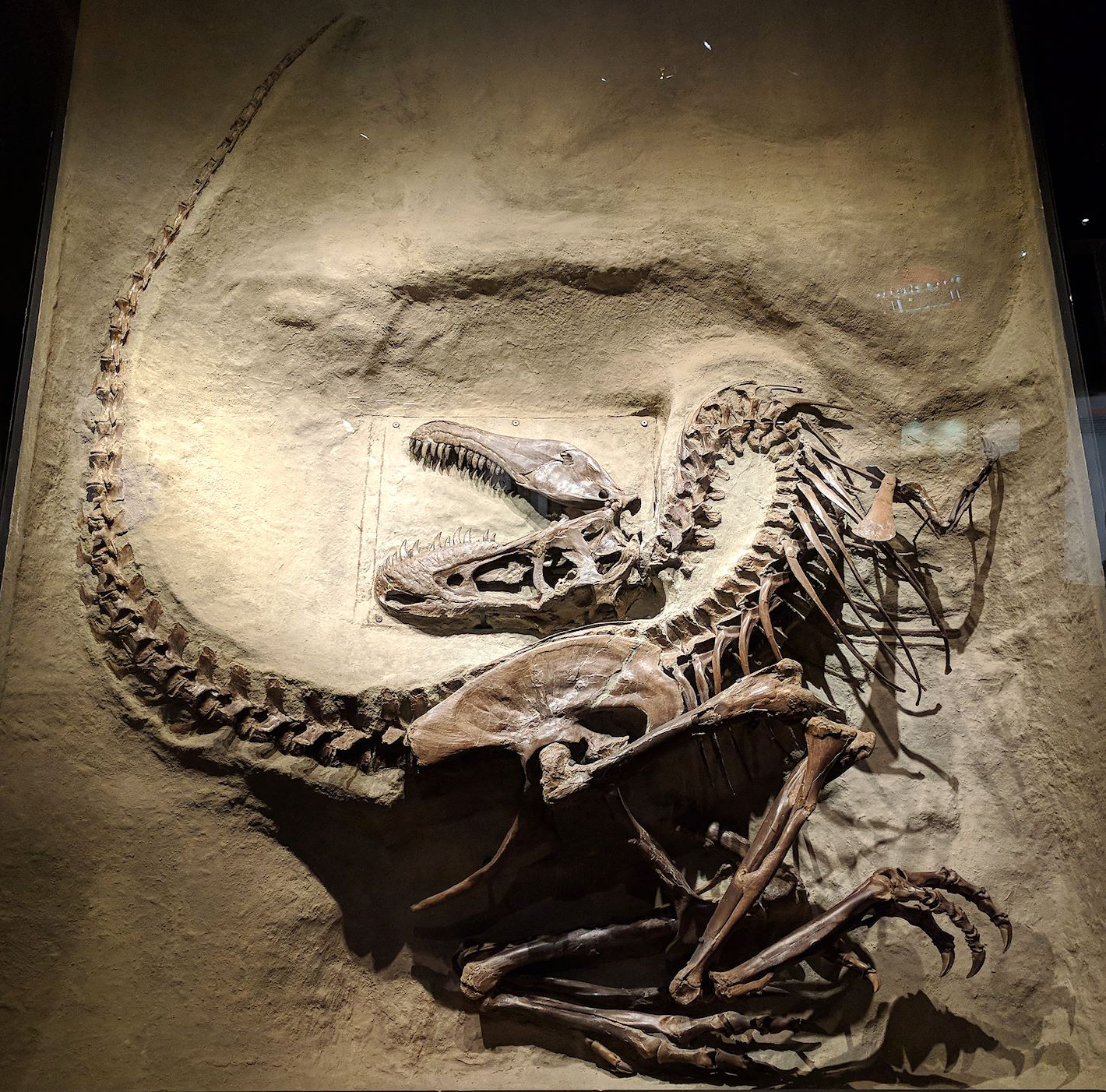
Sub-adult specimen TMP91.36.500 in "death pose", Royal Tyrrell Museum of Palaeontology

Gorgosaurus is classified in the theropod subfamily Albertosaurinae within the family Tyrannosauridae. It is most closely related to the slightly younger Albertosaurus. These are the only two definite albertosaurine genera that have been described, although other undescribed species may exist. Appalachiosaurus was described as a basal tyrannosauroid just outside Tyrannosauridae, although American paleontologist Thomas Holtz published a phylogenetic analysis in 2004 which indicated it was an albertosaurine. More recent, unpublished work by Holtz agrees with the original assessment. All other tyrannosaurid genera, including Daspletosaurus, Tarbosaurus and Tyrannosaurus, are classified in the subfamily Tyrannosaurinae. Compared to the tyrannosaurines, albertosaurines had slender builds, with proportionately smaller, lower skulls and longer bones of the lower leg (tibia) and feet (metatarsals and phalanges).

The close similarities between Gorgosaurus libratus and Albertosaurus sarcophagus have led many experts to combine them into one genus over the years. Albertosaurus was named first, so by convention it is given priority over the name Gorgosaurus, which is sometimes considered its junior synonym. William Diller Matthew and Barnum Brown doubted the distinction of the two genera as early as 1922. Gorgosaurus libratus was formally reassigned to Albertosaurus (as Albertosaurus libratus) by Dale Russell in 1970, and many subsequent authors followed his lead. Combining the two greatly expands the geographical and chronological range of the genus Albertosaurus. Other experts maintain the two genera as separate. Canadian paleontologist Phil Currie claims there are as many anatomical differences between Albertosaurus and Gorgosaurus as there are between Daspletosaurus and Tyrannosaurus, which are almost always kept separate. He also notes that undescribed tyrannosaurids discovered in Alaska, New Mexico and elsewhere in North America may help clarify the situation. Gregory S. Paul has suggested that Gorgosaurus libratus is ancestral to Albertosaurus sarcophagus.

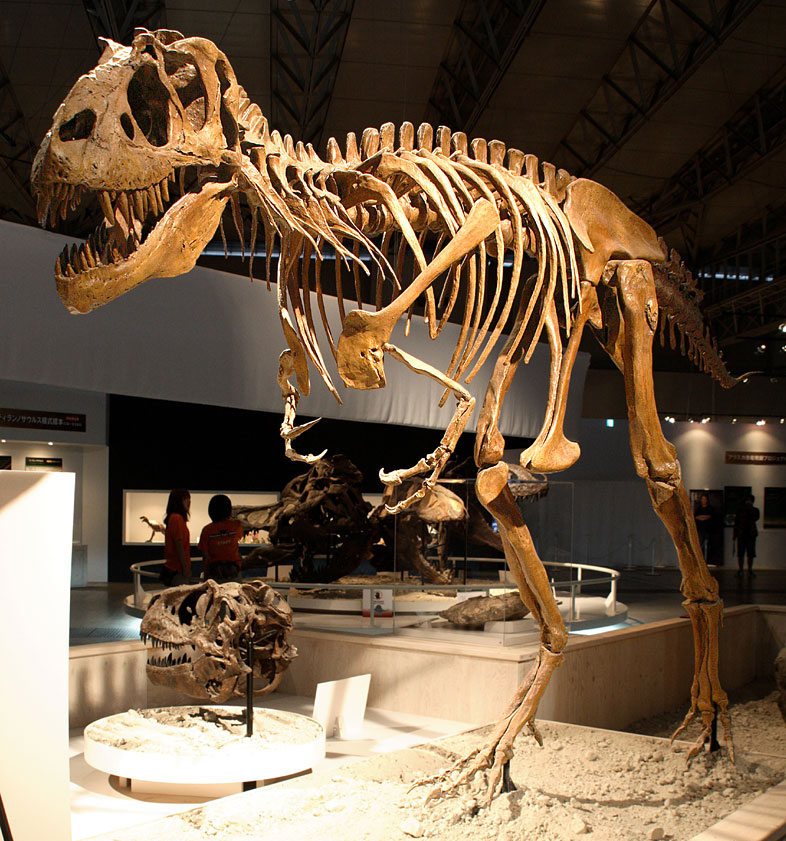
Skeletal mount in Japan

Below is the cladogram of Tyrannosauridae based on the phylogenetic analysis conducted by Loewen et al. in 2013.

- Tyrannosauridae
  - - Gorgosaurus libratus
    - Albertosaurus sarcophagus
  - Tyrannosaurinae
    - Dinosaur Park tyrannosaurid
    - - Daspletosaurus torosus
      - - Two Medicine tyrannosaurid
        - - Teratophoneus curriei
          - - Bistahieversor sealeyi
            - - Lythronax argestes
              - - Tyrannosaurus rex
                - - Tarbosaurus bataar
                  - Zhuchengtyrannus magnus

== Paleobiology ==
=== Diet and feeding ===
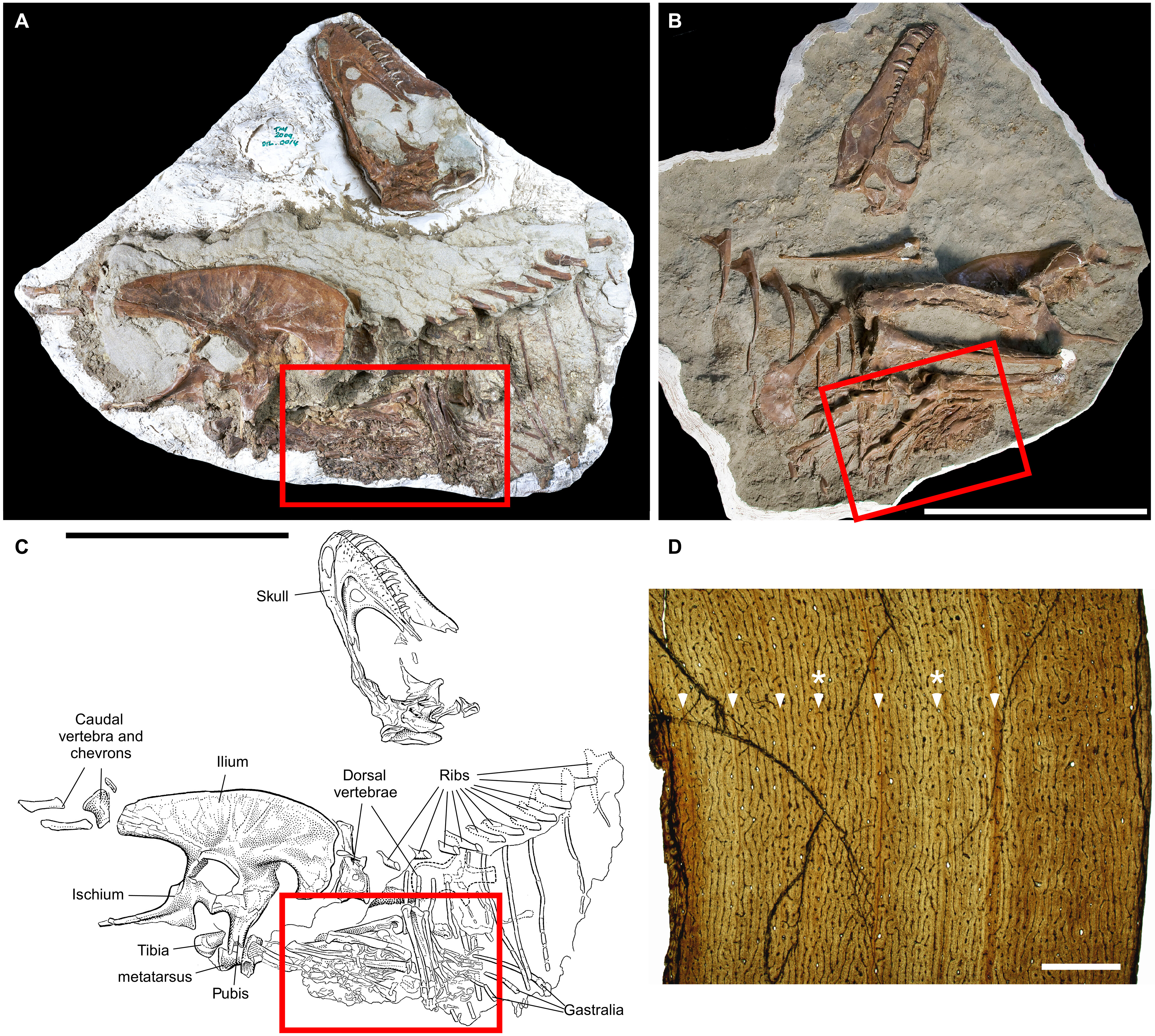
Gorgosaurus juvenile specimen TMP 2009.12.14, featuring stomach contents comprising remains of Citipes

Just like other tyrannosaurids, bite force of Gorgosaurus and Albertosaurus increases slowly among young individuals, and then it increases exponentially when they reach the late juvenile stage. In 2012, Jovannelly and Lane estimated that Gorgosaurus could exert a bite force of at least 22,000, possibly up to 42,000 newtons. Other paleontologists have produced significantly lower bite force estimates. In 2021, given that the largest known Gorgosaurus had a similar bite force to the similar-sized Tyrannosaurus, Therrien and colleagues proposed that the maximum bite force that could be produced by adult albertosaurines is around 12,200 to 21,800 newtons. In 2022, Sakamoto estimated that Gorgosaurus had an anterior bite force of 6,418 newtons and a posterior bite force of 13,817 newtons.

In 2023, a juvenile Gorgosaurus (TMP 2009.12.14) with its in situ stomach contents containing two Citipes juveniles about a year old intact was reported from the Dinosaur Park Formation. This juvenile would have been 5-7 years old at the time of death, measuring about 4 metres (13 ft) long and weighing around 335 kilograms (739 lb). It is much larger than the two Citipes juveniles that weigh about 9–12 kilograms (20–26 lb), contrary to the assumption that tyrannosaurids fed on prey of their size once they reached 16–32 kilograms (35–71 lb), indicating that juvenile tyrannosaurids still consumed much smaller prey after exceeding a certain size threshold. It's a direct dietary evidence that reinforces the theory of 'ontogenetic dietary shift' for tyrannosaurids, as previously inferred by ecological modeling and anatomical features among different age groups. Only the remains of the hindlimbs and caudal vertebrae of juvenile Citipes were present in the tyrannosaurid's stomach cavity, suggesting that a juvenile Gorgosaurus may have had preferential consumption of the muscular hindlimbs. Thomas R. Holtz Jr., a paleontologist who also previously theorized that tyrannosaurs underwent a big dietary shift with maturation, said that the fossil "looks like it was Thanksgiving," as the juvenile Gorgosaurus was mostly eating the legs of Citipes.

=== Life history ===
A graph showing the hypothesized growth curves (body mass versus age) of four tyrannosaurids. Gorgosaurus is shown in blue.

Gregory Erickson and colleagues have studied the growth and life history of tyrannosaurids using bone histology, which can determine the age of a specimen when it died. A growth curve can be developed when the ages of various individuals are plotted against their sizes on a graph. Tyrannosaurids grew throughout their lives, but underwent tremendous growth spurts for about four years, after an extended juvenile phase. Sexual maturity may have ended this rapid growth phase, after which growth slowed down considerably in adult animals. Examining five Gorgosaurus specimens of various sizes, Erickson calculated a maximum growth rate of about 50 kg (110 lb) per year during the rapid growth phase, slower than in tyrannosaurines like Daspletosaurus and Tyrannosaurus, but comparable to Albertosaurus.

Gorgosaurus spent as much as half its life in the juvenile phase before ballooning up to near-maximum size in only a few years. This, along with the complete lack of predators intermediate in size between huge adult tyrannosaurids and other small theropods, suggests that these niches may have been filled by juvenile tyrannosaurids. This pattern is seen in modern Komodo dragons, whose hatchlings start off as tree-dwelling insectivores and slowly mature into massive apex predators capable of taking down large vertebrates. Other tyrannosaurids, including Albertosaurus, have been found in aggregations that some have suggested to represent mixed-age packs, but there is no evidence of gregarious behavior in Gorgosaurus.

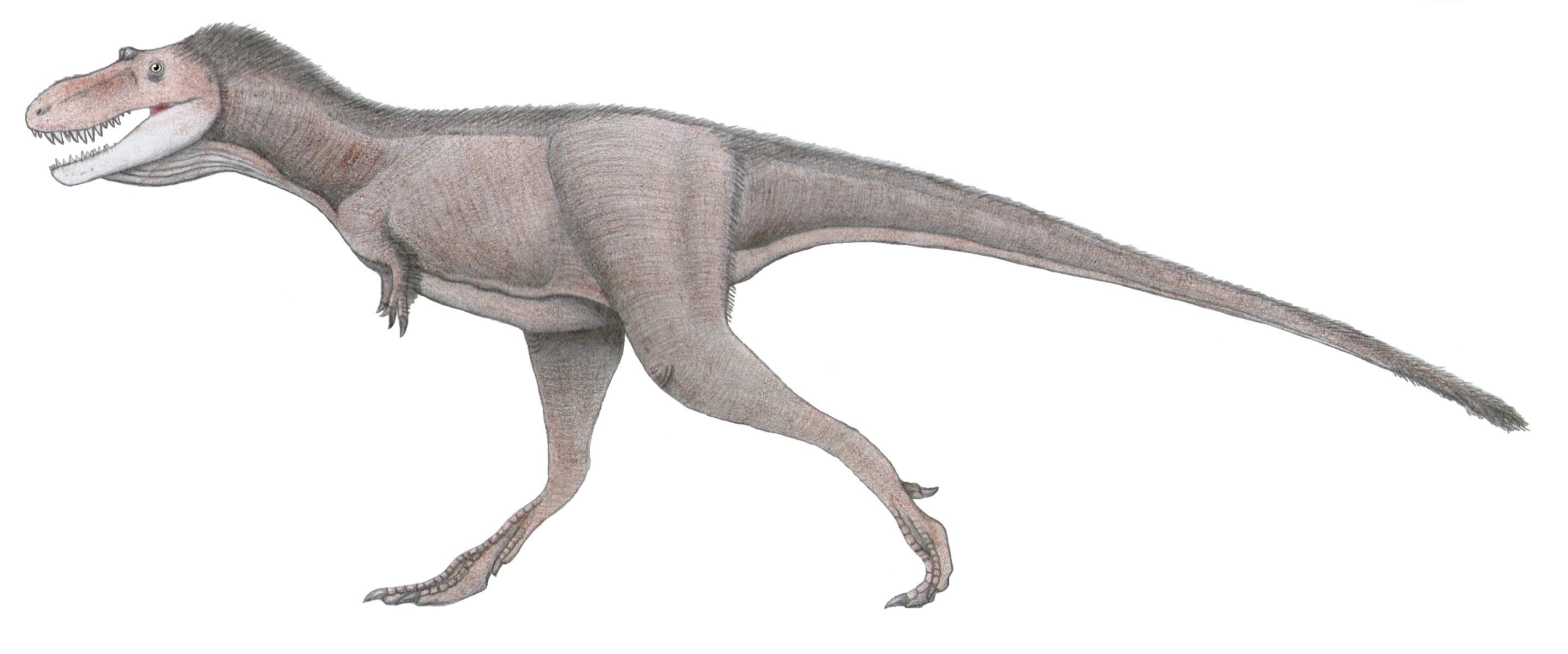
Restoration of a sub-adult

The discovery of two exceptionally preserved juvenile skulls from Gorgosaurus suggests that Gorgosaurus underwent the morphological shift from gracile juveniles to robust adults at an earlier age than Tyrannosaurus, to which it was compared in a study published by Jared Voris et al., suggests that the ontogenetic changes occurred at roughly 5-7 years of age in Gorgosaurus; much earlier than its larger and later relative. However, both tyrannosaur genera underwent these ontogenetic transformations at a similar percent of skull length relative to the large known adult individuals. The study's results likewise indicate that there is a dissociation between body size and cranial development in tyrannosaurs, while simultaneously allowing better identification of juvenile remains that may have been misidentified in museum fossil collections. It is estimated that an ontogenetic dietary shift of Gorgosaurus and Albertosaurus occurs when the mandibular length reaches 58 cm (1.90 ft), indicating that this is the stage when their bite force increases exponentially and when they begin to pursuit large prey.

In July 2026, Longrich and colleagues described a third metatarsal bone of perinate (hatchling) Tyrannosaurus rex and cf. Gorgosaurus libratus, RSKM P2416.82 from the Frenchman Formation and TMP 1981.16.475 from the Dinosaur Park Formation respectively. Histological analyses reveal that lines of arrested growth are absent in both specimens, indicative of hatchling or embryonic stage. Synchrotron scans of each specimen reveal the relatively high density of the outer surface and the pattern changes in cortical (outer layer) bone structure, with a layer similar to the hatchling/neonatal line of modern oviparous (egg-laying) and viviparous (giving live birth) taxa that characterize the transition from embryonic to hatchling stage. The scans also detected evidence of Haversian bone remodeling, the continuous process of bone tissue breaking down and rebuilding to form secondary canals (tubular channels connecting bones), which are indicative of hatchling stage and precociality, relative maturity and mobility at birth. The layer lining the medullary cavity of both specimens likely represent endosteal bone deposition, during which new bone matrix is deposited on the inner surface of the cortical bone. The authors also described a partial dentary (FMNH PR 4920) from the Hell Creek Formation and isolated teeth from the Lance Formation as hatchling T. rex and interpret their tooth wear as evidence of consuming relatively large vertebrates.

The body length and body mass of the hatchling T. rex (RSKM P2416.82) are estimated to be approximately 75 cm (2.46 ft) and 2.5 kg (5.5 lb) respectively, and those of the hatchling cf. G. libratus (TMP 1981.16.475) are estimated to be approximately 70 cm (2.3 ft) and 2.4 kg (5.3 lb) respectively. On the basis of these body size estimates, Longrich et al. (2026) suggested that the clutch of the confirmed, reproductively mature female T. rex (MOR 1125) would have weighed at least 54–60 kg (119–132 lb) which would possibly correspond to 21-32 eggs. They further stated that larger clutch sizes are also plausible, indicating that tyrannosaurids possibly employed R-selection, a reproductive strategy that maximizes the number of offsprings through large clutch size and minimal parental investment, which would have resulted in rapid maturation of the hatchlings, slower than that of modern birds. It is also likely that the reproduction strategy of tyrannosaurids was an intermediate between R-selection and K-selection, the latter of which would maximize parental investment with fewer number of offsprings and delayed maturation. Given the uniparental care observed in modern crocodilians and basal (early-diverging) birds, most non-avian dinosaurs including T. rex were likely uniparental as well. The authors also estimated that the relative size of tyrannosaurid hatchlings and eggs are larger than that of squamates, turtles, crocodilians, pterosaurs, and certain dinosaur clades (protoceratopsids and basal sauropodomorphs), but smaller than that of eumaniraptorans and modern birds, probably weighing less in both relative and absolute size than those of the elephant bird Aepyornis maximus and the South Island giant moa.

=== Paleopathology ===
TMP 2017.012.0002
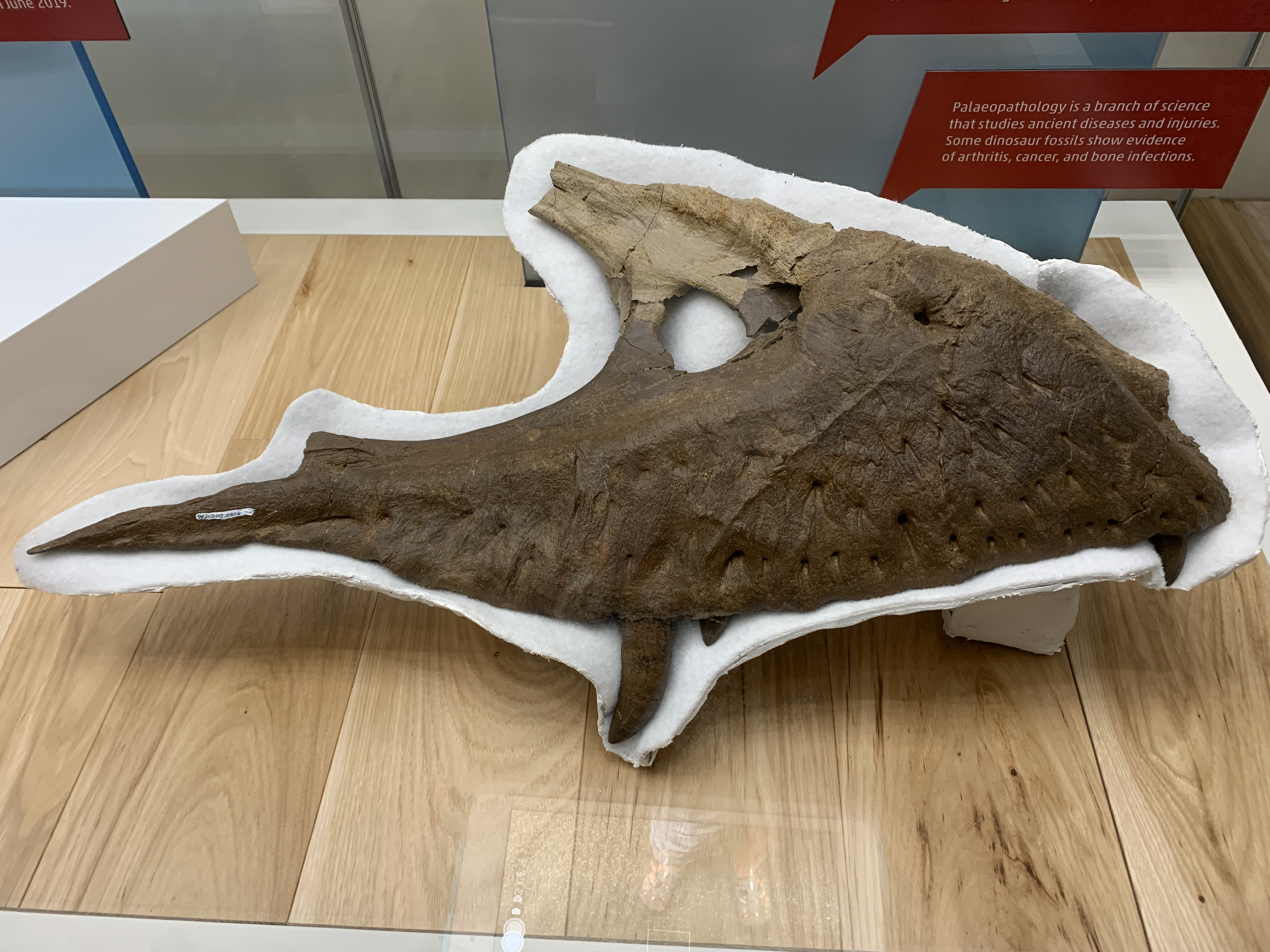

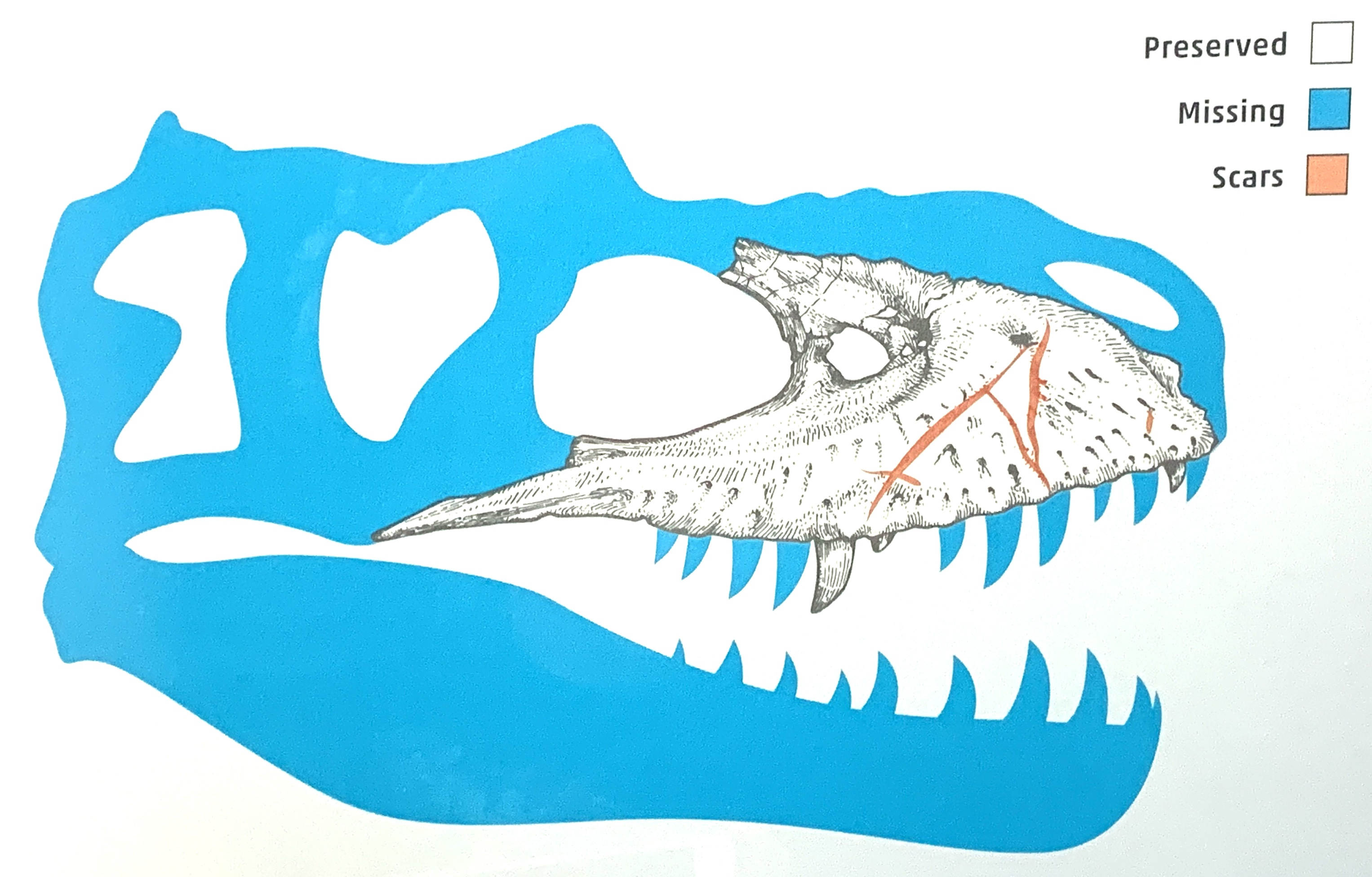
Gorgosaurus right maxilla with 5 raised scars; healed bite marks.

Several pathologies have been documented in the Gorgosaurus libratus holotype, NMC 2120. These include the third right dorsal rib, as well as healed fractures on the 13th and 14th gastralia and left fibula. Its fourth left metatarsal bore roughened exostoses both in the middle and at the far end. The third phalanx of the third right toe is deformed, as the claw on that digit has been described as "quite small and amorphous". The three pathologies may have been received in a single encounter with another dinosaur.

Another specimen cataloged as TMP94.12.602 bears multiple pathologies. A 10 cm (3.9 in) longitudinal fracture is present in the middle of the right fibula's shaft. Multiple ribs bear healed fractures and the specimen had a pseudoarthortic gastralium. Lesions from a bite received to the face were present and showed evidence that the wounds were healing before the animal died.

Another specimen has a poorly healed fracture of the right fibula, which left a large callus on the bone. In a 2001 study conducted by Bruce Rothschild and other paleontologists, 54 foot bones referred to Gorgosaurus were examined for signs of stress fracture, but none were found.

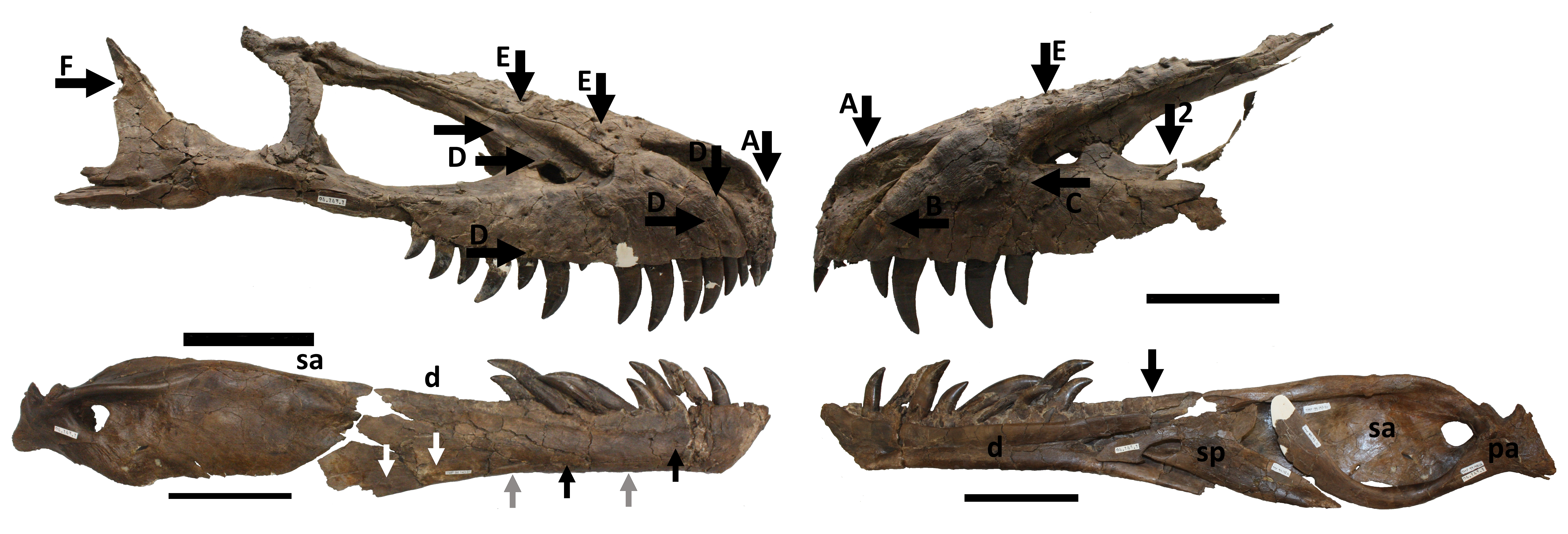
TMP 1994.143.1, the skull of a juvenile tyrannosaur from the Dinosaur Park Formation previously thought to be Daspletosaurus sp. but since 2019 assigned to Gorgosaurus libratus. The arrows point at various tyrannosaur bite marks.

As with many tyrannosaurids, several Gorgosaurus specimens show evidence of intraspecific face biting.

Specimen TMP 1994.143.1, a juvenile skull from the Dinosaur Park Formation with several tyrannosaur bite marks, was previously believed to be Daspletosaurus sp. but was later assigned to Gorgosaurus libratus.

TMP 2017.012.0002 is a Gorgosaurus right maxilla with five raised scars; healed injuries from face biting by conspecifics.

TMP91.36.500 is a very complete sub-adult Gorgosaurus with preserved face bite injuries and also has a thoroughly healed fracture in the right fibula. Also present was a healed fracture in the dentary and what the authors describing the specimen referred to as "a mushroom-like hyperostosis of a right pedal phalanx." Ralph Molnar has speculated that this may be the same kind of pathology afflicting an unidentified ornithomimid discovered with a similar mushroom shaped growth on a toe bone. TMP91.36.500 is also preserved in a characteristic death pose.

== Paleoenvironment ==
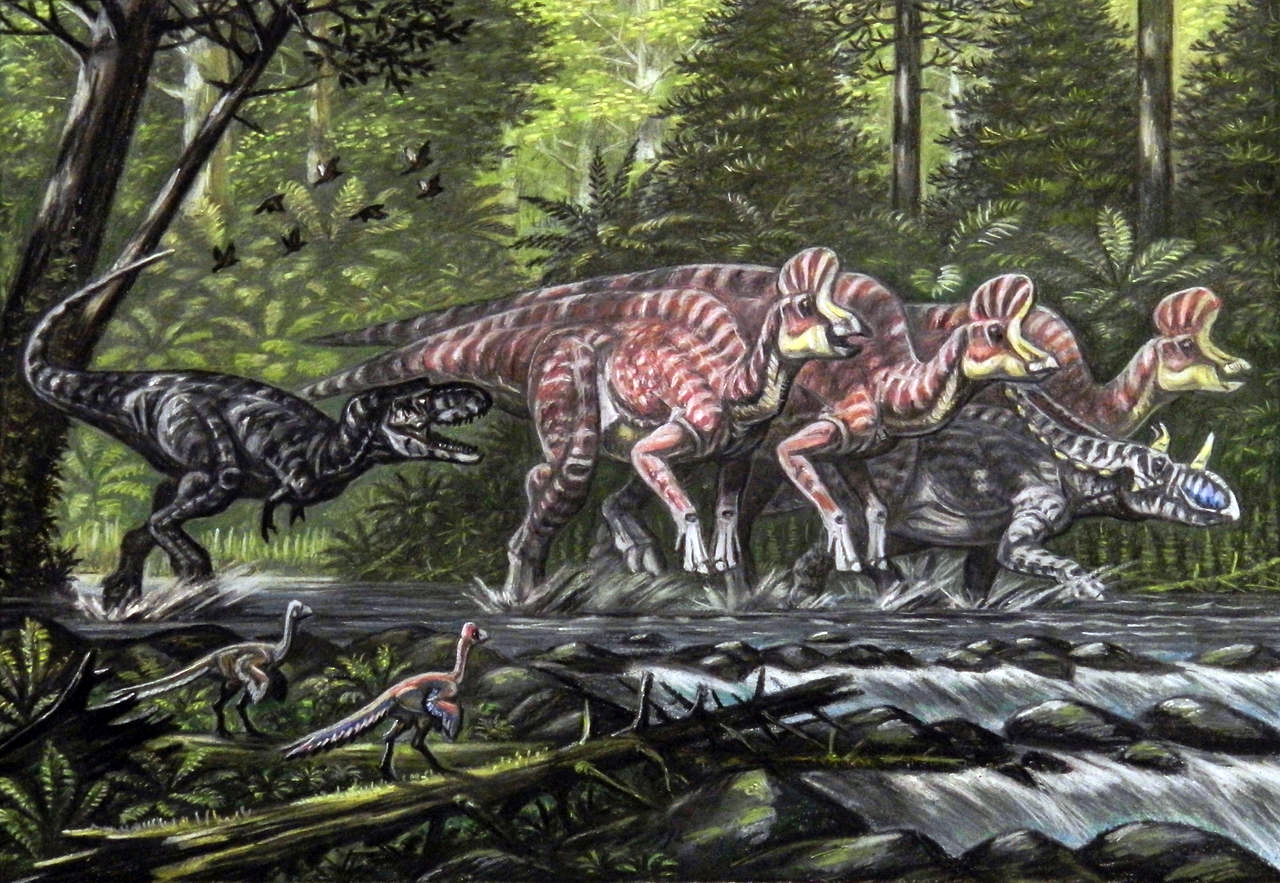
Restoration of Gorgosaurus chasing Corythosaurus and Chasmosaurus

Most specimens of Gorgosaurus libratus have been recovered from the Dinosaur Park Formation in Alberta. This formation dates to the middle of the Campanian, between 76.5 and 74.8 million years ago, and Gorgosaurus libratus fossils are known specifically from the lower to middle section of the formation, between 76.6 and 75.1 million years ago. The geologically youngest known Gorgosaurus fossil in Canada is known from the Wapiti Formation of British Columbia, most likely from either Unit 2 or 3 which is dated to the late Campanian, approximately 73.77 ± 1.46 million years ago. The Two Medicine Formation and Judith River Formation of Montana have also yielded possible Gorgosaurus remains. At this time, the area was a coastal plain along the western edge of the Western Interior Seaway, which divided North America in half. The Laramide Orogeny had begun uplifting the Rocky Mountains to the west, from which flowed great rivers that deposited eroded sediment in vast floodplains along the coast. The climate was subtropical with marked seasonality, and periodic droughts sometimes resulted in massive mortality among the great herds of dinosaurs, as represented in the numerous bonebed deposits preserved in the Dinosaur Park Formation. Conifers formed the forest canopy, while the understory plants consisted of ferns, tree ferns and angiosperms. Around 73 million years ago, the seaway began to expand, transgressing into areas formerly above sea level and drowning the Dinosaur Park ecosystem. This transgression, called the Bearpaw Sea, is recorded by the marine sediments of the massive Bearpaw Shale.

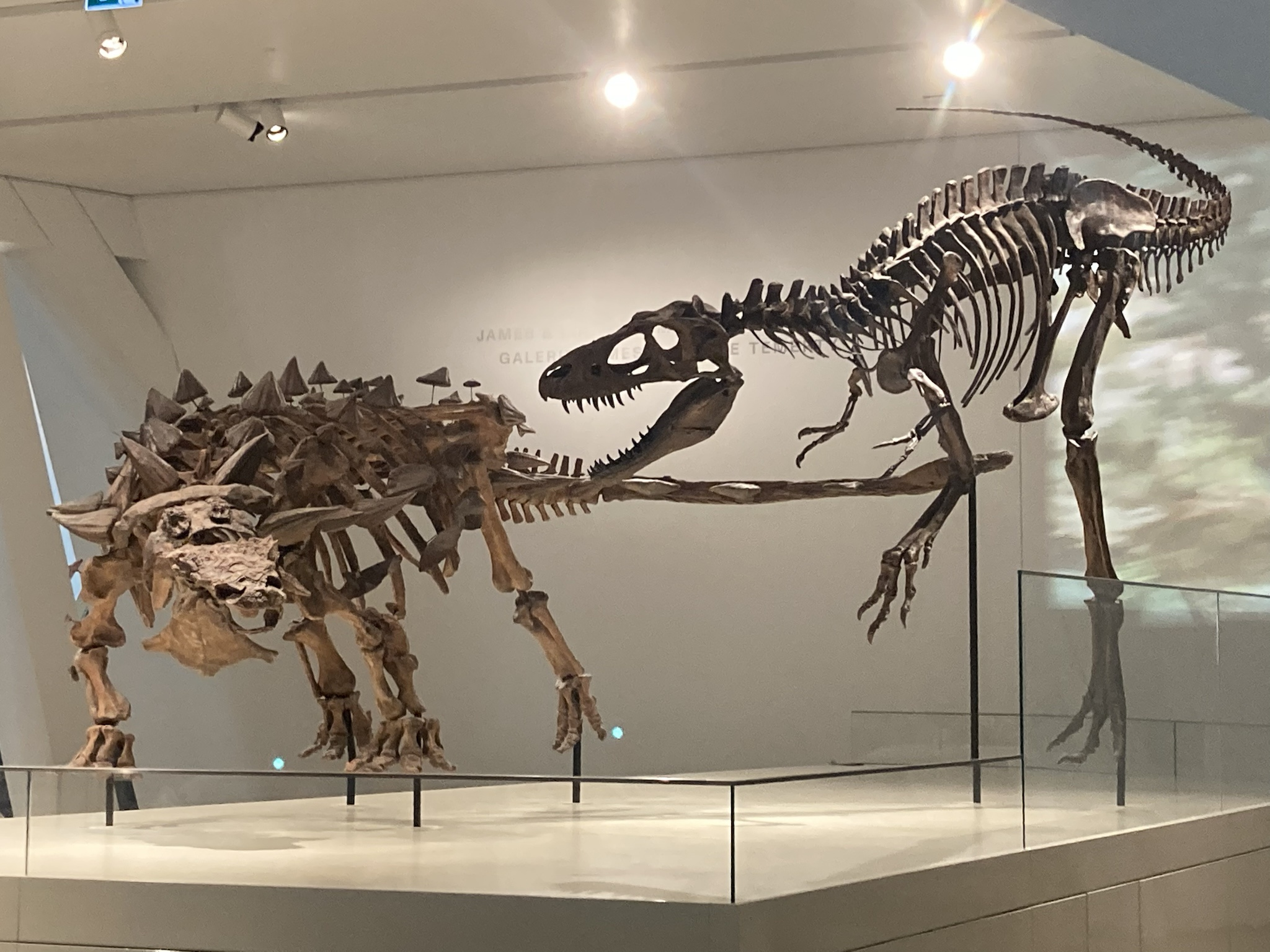
Gorgosaurus mounted in combat with Zuul

The Dinosaur Park Formation preserves a great wealth of vertebrate fossils. A wide variety of fish swam the rivers and estuaries, including gars, sturgeons, sharks and rays, among others. Frogs, salamanders, turtles, crocodilians and champsosaurs also dwelled in the aquatic habitats. Azhdarchid pterosaurs and ornithuran birds like Apatornis flew overhead, while the enantiornithine bird Avisaurus lived on the ground alongside multituberculate, metatherian and eutherian mammals. A number of species of terrestrial lizards were also present, including whiptails, skinks, monitors and alligator lizards. Dinosaur fossils in particular are found with unrivaled abundance and diversity. Huge herds of ceratopsids roamed the floodplains alongside equally large groups of saurolophine and lambeosaurine hadrosaurs. Other herbivorous groups like ornithomimids, pachycephalosaurs, small ornithopods, nodosaurids and ankylosaurids were also represented. Small predatory dinosaurs like oviraptorosaurs, troodonts and dromaeosaurs hunted smaller prey than the huge tyrannosaurids; Daspletosaurus and Gorgosaurus, which were two orders of magnitude larger in mass. Intervening predatory niches may have been filled by young tyrannosaurids. A Saurornitholestes dentary has been discovered in the Dinosaur Park Formation that bore tooth marks left by the bite of a young tyrannosaur, possibly Gorgosaurus.

=== Coexistence with Daspletosaurus ===
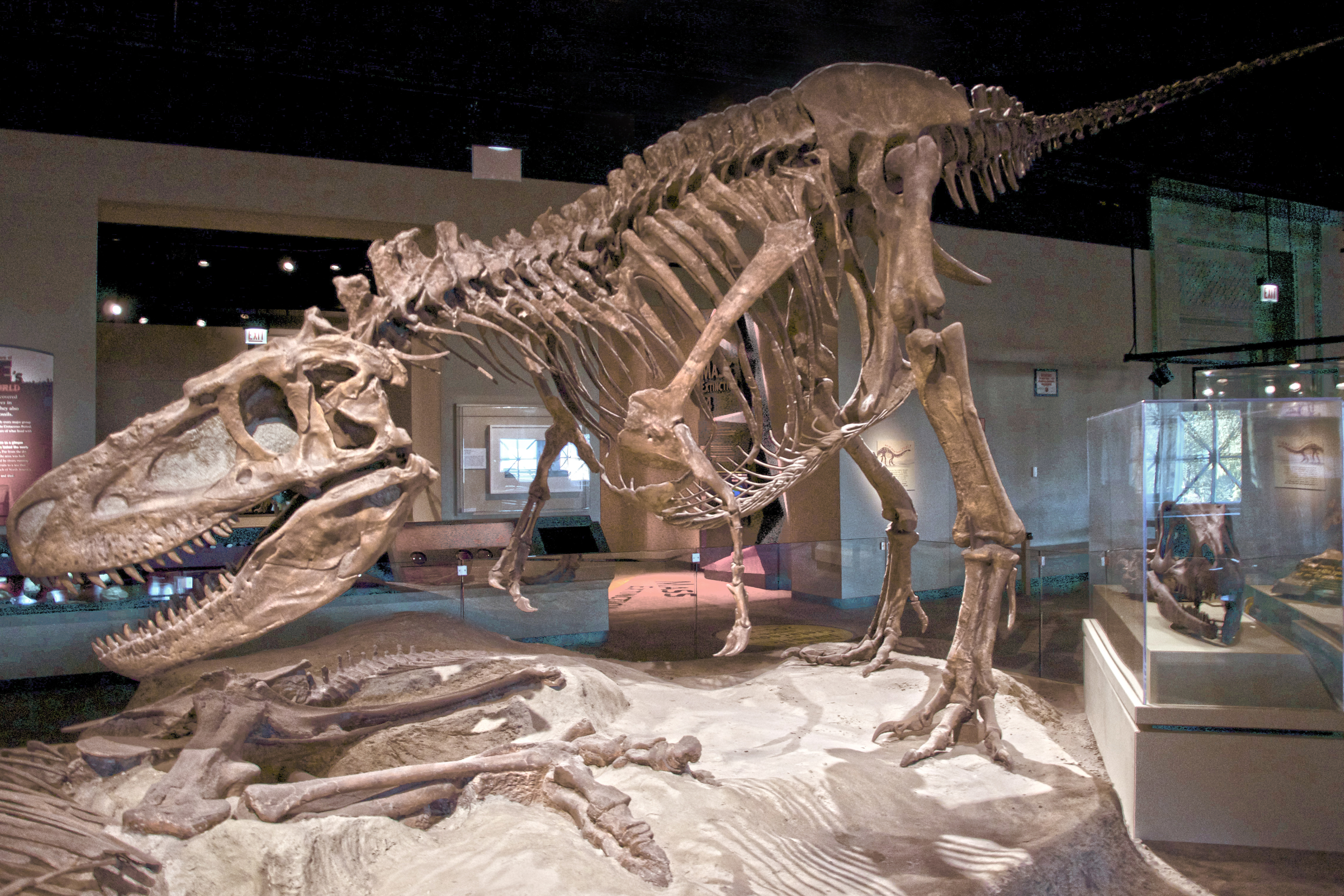
Dinosaur Park specimen (FMNH PR308) of Daspletosaurus, mounted at the Field Museum

In the middle stages of the Dinosaur Park Formation, Gorgosaurus lived alongside a rarer genus of tyrannosaurid, Daspletosaurus. This is one of the few examples of two tyrannosaur genera coexisting. Similar-sized predators in modern predator guilds are separated into different ecological niches by anatomical, behavioral or geographical differences that limit competition. Niche differentiation between the Dinosaur Park tyrannosaurids is not well understood. In 1970, Dale Russell hypothesized that the more common Gorgosaurus actively hunted fleet-footed hadrosaurs, while the rarer and more troublesome ceratopsians and ankylosaurians (horned and heavily armoured dinosaurs) were left to the more heavy built Daspletosaurus. However, a specimen of Daspletosaurus (OTM 200) from the contemporaneous Two Medicine Formation of Montana preserves the digested remains of a juvenile hadrosaur in its gut region, and another bonebed contains the remains of three Daspletosaurus along with the remains of at least five hadrosaurs.

Unlike some other groups of dinosaurs, neither genus was more common at higher or lower elevations than the other. However, Gorgosaurus appears more common in northern formations like the Dinosaur Park Formation, with species of Daspletosaurus being more abundant to the south. The same pattern is seen in other groups of dinosaurs. Chasmosaurine ceratopsians and saurolophine hadrosaurs are also more common in the Two Medicine Formation of Montana and in southwestern North America during the Campanian, while centrosaurines and lambeosaurines dominate in northern latitudes. Thomas Holtz has suggested that this pattern indicates shared ecological preferences between tyrannosaurines, chasmosaurines and saurolophines. At the end of the later Maastrichtian stage, tyrannosaurines like Tyrannosaurus, saurolophines like Edmontosaurus and Kritosaurus and chasmosaurines like Triceratops and Torosaurus were widespread throughout western North America, while lambeosaurines were rare, consisting of a few species like Hypacrosaurus, and albertosaurines and centrosaurines had gone extinct.

== See also ==
- Timeline of tyrannosaur research
