= United States v. One Tyrannosaurus Bataar Skeleton =

2013 US federal court case

- Court: United States District Court for the Southern District of New York
- Full case name: United States v. One Tyrannosaurus Bataar Skeleton
- Decided: May 6, 2013
- Citation: 1:13−cv−00857

United States v. One Tyrannosaurus Bataar Skeleton (1:13−cv−00857) is a 2013 United States District Court for the Southern District of New York judgment regarding a requested order from the United States government to seize an imported Mongolian Tarbosaurus (referred to as a Tyrannosaurus bataar in the case title) skeleton related to smuggling law and the applicability of Mongolian law in the United States.

The form of the styling of this case—the defendant being an object, rather than a legal person—is because this is a jurisdiction in rem (power over objects) case, rather than the more familiar in personam (over persons) case.

== History ==
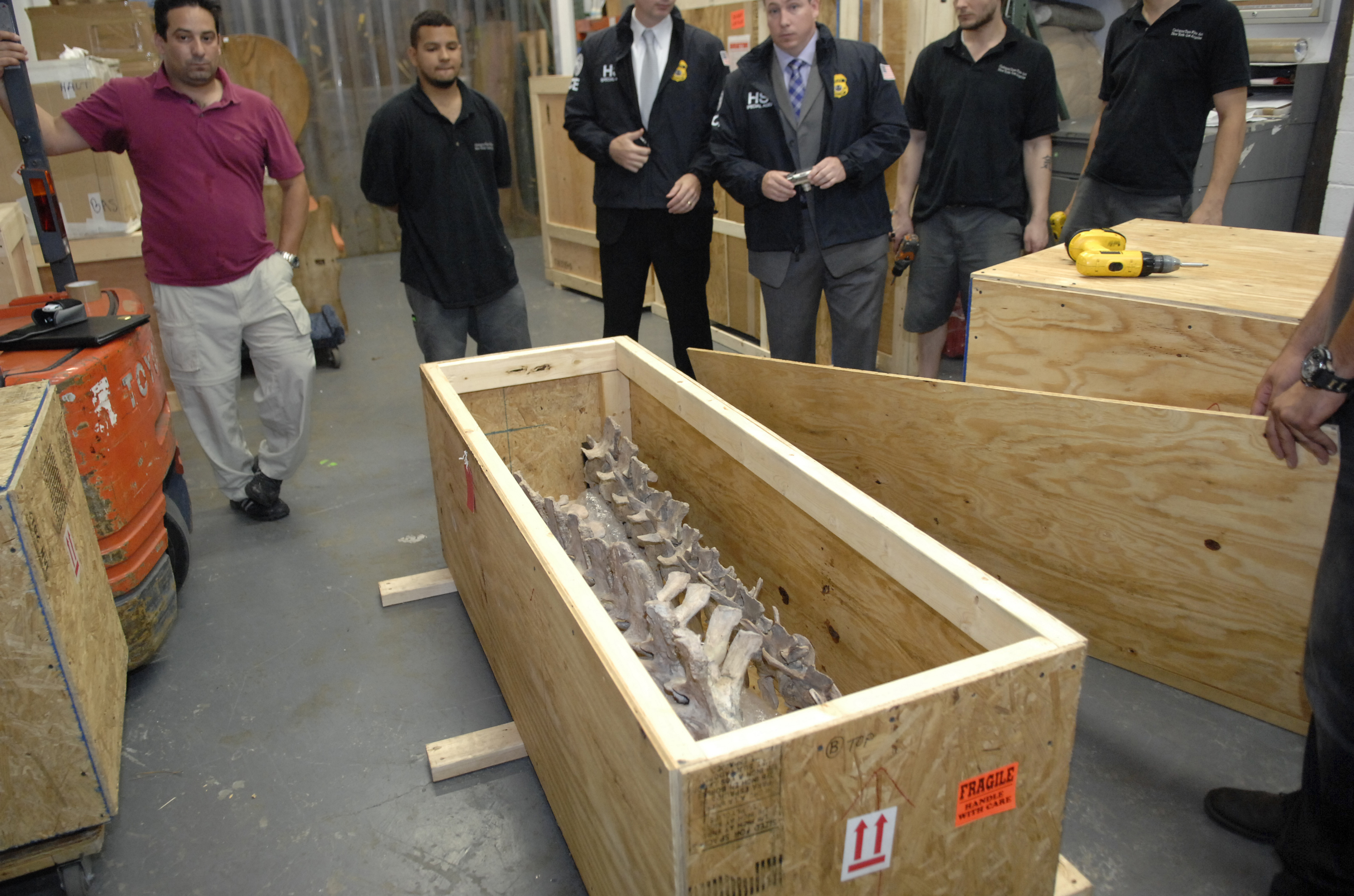
Customs officials with the skeleton

In early 2012, Florida businessman Eric Prokopi imported a Tyrannosaurus bataar (or Tarbosaurus bataar) skeleton from Mongolia into the United Kingdom. From there he imported it into the United States declaring on the import customs form that the skeleton originated in Great Britain. The skeleton was sold at auction in New York by Heritage Auctions on May 20, 2012, for over $1 million. However, the Government of Mongolia declared an interest in the skeleton and obtained a restraining order preventing the sale from being completed. This was because the Constitution of Mongolia declares that all dinosaur fossils are "culturally significant" and can not be removed from Mongolia without government consent. The skeleton had been recognized by Mongolian paleontologist Bolortsetseg Minjin as coming from Mongolia. Paleontologists examined the skeleton and confirmed it was of Mongolian origin and not British origin as the import papers had indicated. On June 18, the United States Attorney's Office filed a civil action that led to the district court ordering ICE to seize the skeleton. This was followed on September 24 by an amended civil forfeiture complaint with paleontologists' reports that showed, based on the coloring of the bones, that "the First Bataar skeleton undoubtedly came from Mongolia's Gobi Desert".

Prokopi argued against this, claiming that the majority of the skeleton was already in the United States and did not comprise part of the shipment that had false import papers claiming it was from the UK instead of Mongolia. He also argued that Tyrannosaurus bataar could also be found in China and not solely in Mongolia so there was doubt as to if the skeleton did belong to Mongolia. He also argued that while the Constitution of Mongolia prohibited export of "culturally significant" artifacts, it did not apply under United States law.

== Judgment ==
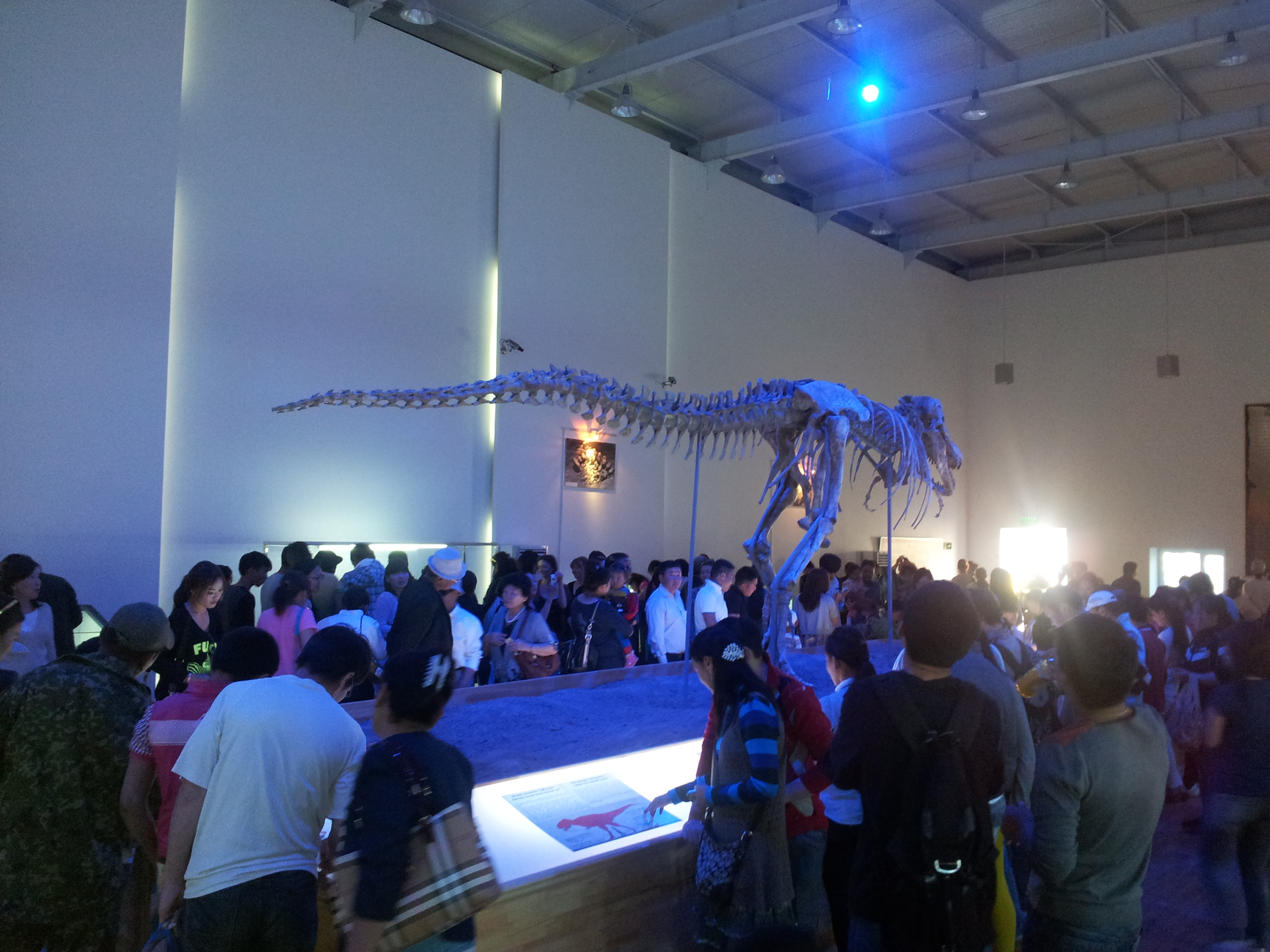
Specimen repatriated to Mongolia from the US in 2013

In October 2012, Prokopi was arrested in relation to the Tyrannosaurus bataar skeleton as well as two other dinosaur skeletons on counts of conspiracy to smuggle illegal goods, possess stolen property, and make false statements, one count of smuggling goods into the United States, and one count of interstate sale and receipt of stolen goods. As part of his plea bargain, he agreed to give up all claims to the skeletons. As a result of the withdrawal of title to the skeleton, in 2013 the judge dismissed Prokopi's complaint and granted the United States the right to seize the skeleton in order to return it to Mongolia. Prokopi was later jailed for three months. In May 2013, the United States returned the skeleton to Mongolia, where it was put on display at a pop-up museum in Sukhbaatar Square in the capital, Ulaanbaatar, and then exhibited in Darkhan.

== Legacy ==
The case was later cited as a precedent for the principle that the government may provide paleontological evidence if a country of origin is obscured. The case also brought about a discussion in American media regarding the effect of "dinosaur smuggling". In 2015, American actor Nicolas Cage returned a Tyrannosaurus bataar skull he had purchased in 2007 (after outbidding Leonardo DiCaprio). The skull was purchased from a gallery which has previously sold fossils smuggled by Prokopi. In 2018, a book titled The Dinosaur Artist: Obsession, Betrayal and the Quest for the Ultimate Trophy by writer Paige Williams covering the background, context, and details of the case was published by Hachette Books.

== See also ==
- List of dinosaur specimens sold at auction
