= Bolortsetseg Minjin =

Mongolian paleontologist

- Born: Ulaanbaatar, Mongolia
- Education: Mongolian University of Science and Technology
- Known for: Fossil repatriation, dinosaur-based science outreach
- Scientific career
- Fields: Paleontology
- Workplaces: American Museum of Natural History, Institute for the Study of Mongolian Dinosaurs
- Doctoral advisor: Michael Novacek
- Other academic advisors: Jack Horner, Minjin Chuluun, Mark Norell, Meng Jin

Bolortsetseg Minjin is a Mongolian paleontologist known for her work in fossil repatriation and dinosaur-themed science outreach. She is a recipient of the WINGS WorldQuest Women of Discovery Award for Earth, National Geographic Explorer, and TEDx speaker. She is the founder of the Institute for the Study of Mongolian Dinosaurs.

== Biography ==
Bolortsetseg (also known as "Bolor") grew up in Ulaanbaatar, Mongolia. She is the daughter of the late Mongolian paleontologist Minjin Chuluun.

As a child, her father's work inspired her to study paleontology as well. She learned Russian to read his books about dinosaurs. She attended the Mongolian University of Science and Technology, where she earned a bachelor's degree in geology and a master's in invertebrate paleontology. When she entered graduate school, the only paleontologist at the university was her father, and he became her adviser.

In 1996, she joined a paleontology expedition to Mongolia led by American Museum of Natural History (AMNH) paleontologists Michael Novacek and Mark Norell. Though she already held a master's degree in paleontology, she was only allowed to join as a cook for the Mongolian crew. Instead of cooking, she spent her time on the expedition prospecting and found several mammal and lizard fossils, which caught the attention of the expedition leaders. They invited her to join them at the AMNH in New York, where she completed her Ph.D. through a Graduate Center of the City University of New York joint program.

After moving to the United States, she began to focus her career on improving the state of Mongolian paleontology. She became concerned that very few Mongolians her age and younger were choosing paleontology as a career, despite the large number of well-preserved fossils from her country. To learn more about training paleontologists, she collaborated with Jack Horner of the Museum of the Rockies, who helped her establish the Institute for the Study of Mongolian Dinosaurs in 2007.

== Research ==
Bolortsetseg has studied and discovered dinosaur and mammal fossils from the Gobi Desert that range in age from 145 to 65 million years. She once located 67 dinosaur fossils in one week.

She has led two field expeditions with the Museum of the Rockies. Her doctoral work at City University of New York involved the postcranial skeleton of Multituberculata, especially specimens from the Late Cretaceous of Mongolia. She conducted post-doctoral research at the Museum of the Rockies on the paleobiology of Psittacosaurus, a Cretaceous dinosaur. Paleontologist Jack Horner served as her post-doctoral advisor.

== Fossil repatriation ==
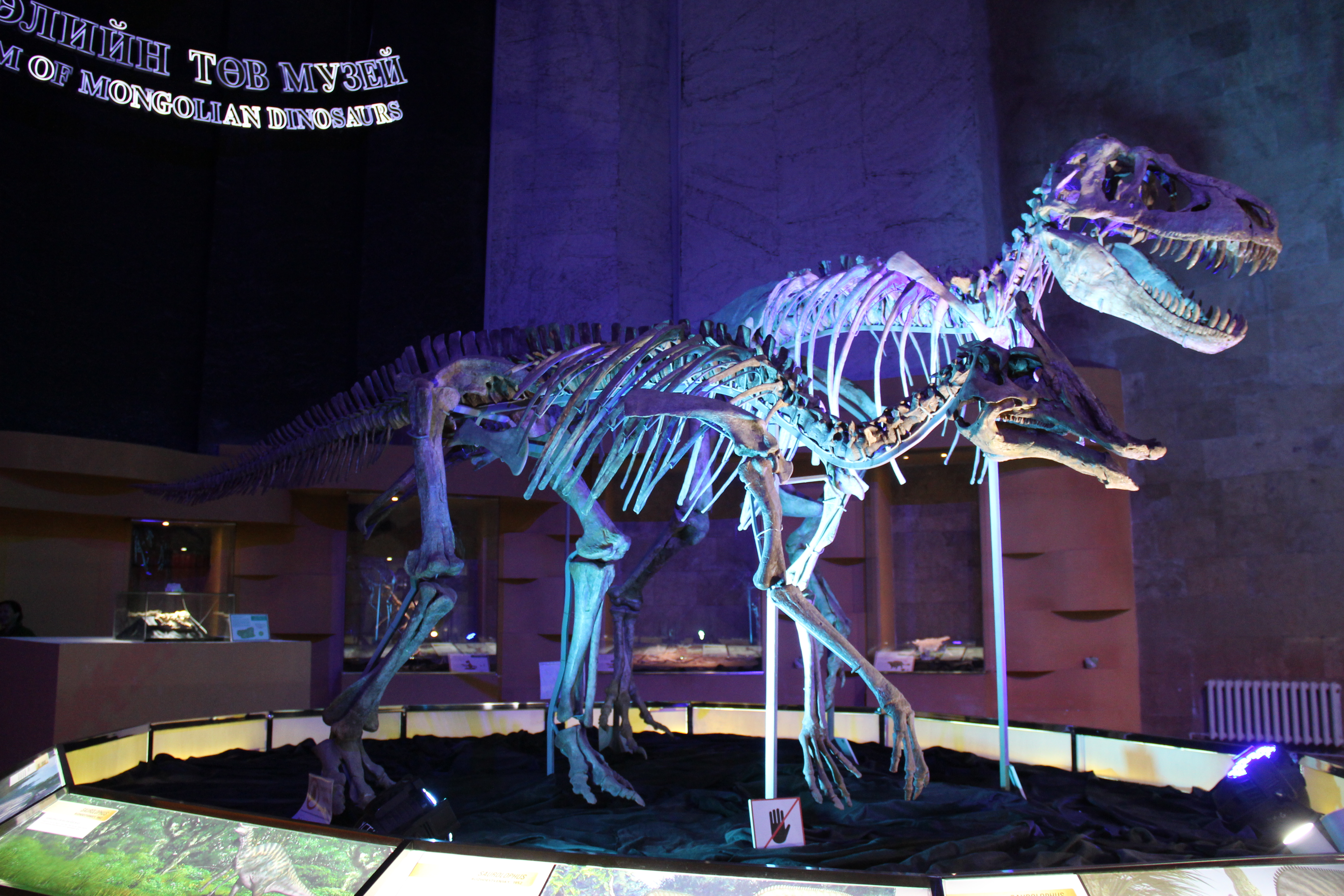
Tarbosaurus and Saurolophus skeletons that were smuggled to the US, and subsequently returned to Mongolia, at Central Museum of Mongolian Dinosaurs

A fossil skeleton of the Tyrannosaurus-like dinosaur Tarbosaurus bataar went up for auction in 2012, making international headlines. Bolortsetseg recognized it as a Mongolian specimen and reported the auction to Mongolian authorities, helping them stop the dinosaur from falling into the hands of a private bidder. The case became known as United States v. One Tyrannosaurus Bataar Skeleton. The skeleton now resides at the Central Museum of Mongolian Dinosaurs in Ulaanbaatar.

Since that time, she has assisted the United States and Mongolian governments with the repatriation of over 30 dinosaur specimens, all of which were taken illegally from Mongolia.

== Science Outreach ==
Bolortsetseg has organized dinosaur-themed science workshops for children in Mongolia since 2009 through her nonprofit organization, the Institute for the Study of Mongolian Dinosaurs. In 2013, the American Museum of Natural History donated a movable dinosaur museum to the organization. With the help of two crowdfunding campaigns and philanthropist Gerry Ohrstrom, she has taken the museum on two tours to students in rural areas of Mongolia.
