= Paige Williams (author) =

American journalist and author

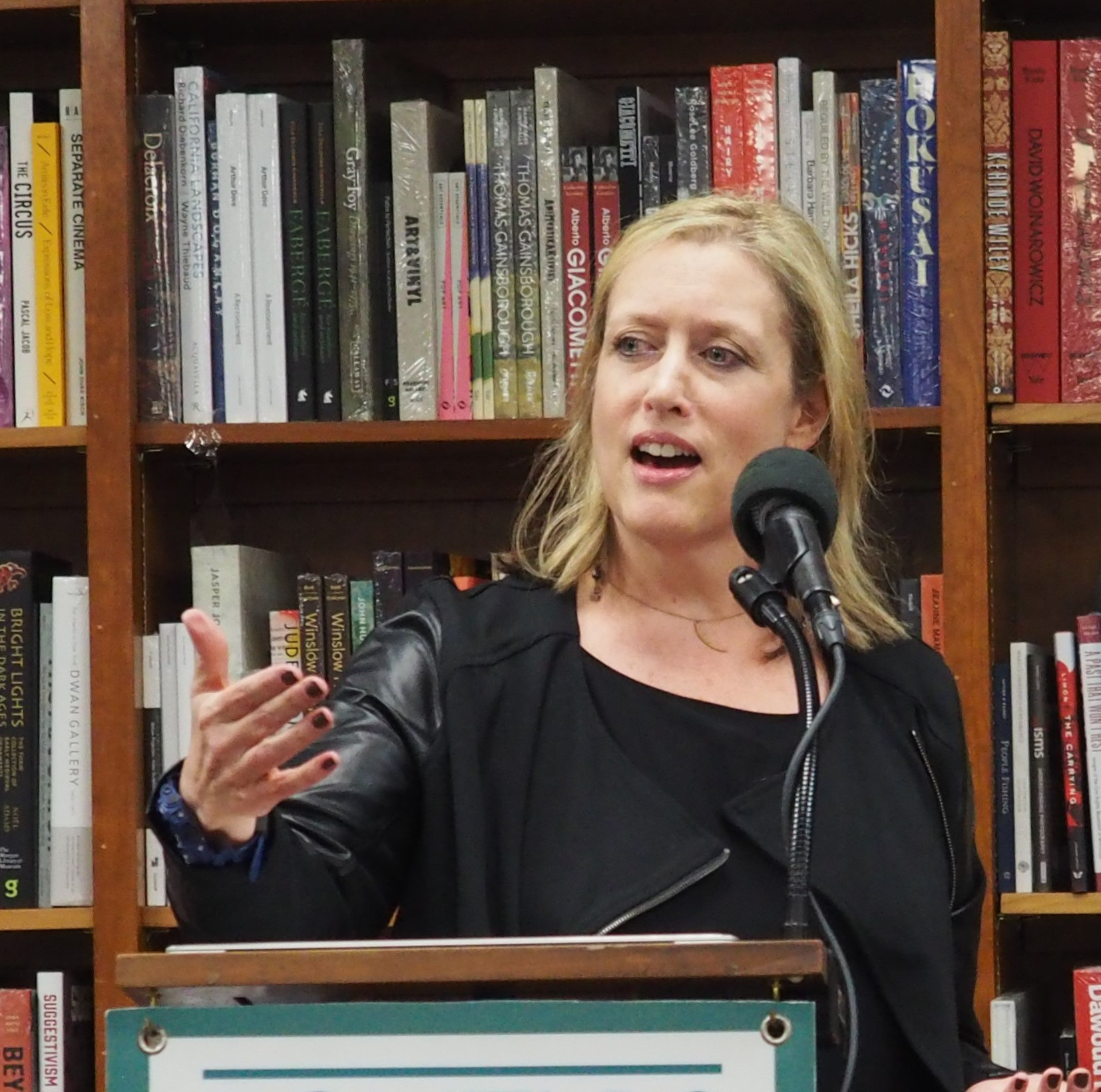
- Born: Oxford, Mississippi, U.S.
- Writing career
- Genre: Nonfiction
- Notable work: The Dinosaur Artist
- Notable awards: National Magazine Award

Paige Williams is an American journalist and author. She is a staff writer at The New Yorker. Williams held a Nieman Fellowship at Harvard, and her work has won a National Magazine Award for feature writing. She has served as editor of Nieman Storyboard and has taught classes in narrative writing for the Nieman Foundation.

Williams' work is included in the 2009 and 2011 editions of The Best American Magazine Writing and the 2003 and 2006 editions of The Best American Crime Writing. Her 2013 New Yorker article "Bones of Contention" explored the black-market fossil trade. The story was expanded into a book titled The Dinosaur Artist, published by the Hachette Book Group in 2018.

== Background ==
Williams was born in Oxford, Mississippi, and grew up in Tupelo. She earned her undergraduate degree at the University of Mississippi, where she was a member of the Chi Omega sorority. She holds an MFA in fiction from Columbia University.

She began reporting as an intern for The Washington Post and the Clarion-Ledger in Jackson, Mississippi. Later, Williams served as a staff writer for the Charlotte Observer. While working as a freelancer, Williams lectured at a number of universities including NYU, Emory, Pittsburgh, MIT and Mississippi. She is a former editor of Nieman Storyboard. In 2010, she left a position as executive editor of Boston Magazine to teach narrative writing at Harvard's Nieman Foundation.

In June 2015, Williams joined the writing staff of The New Yorker. She was the Laventhol/Newsday Visiting Associate Professor at Columbia University's Graduate School of Journalism.

== Works ==
=== "You Have Thousands of Angels Around You" ===
Williams' article for Atlanta Magazine chronicles the story of a Burundian woman, Cynthia Siyamvo, who came to the United States seeking political asylum. The story examines the violence between the Tutsi and Hutu peoples that has driven Cynthia from her home as well as the challenges refugees face acclimating to their new communities.

"You Have Thousands of Angels Around You," earned Williams a National Magazine Award in the category of feature writing, the first of this award for Atlanta Magazine. The American Society of Magazine Editors praised the style and originality of the reporting, while also recognizing editor-in-chief Rebecca Burns for her work on the feature.

=== "Finding Dolly Freed" ===
In a Wired blog post, Williams says she began developing a story about Dolly Freed in late April 2009. Freed experienced brief cult fame when, at the age of 18, she published the book Possum Living: How to Live Well Without A Job and (Almost) No Money. Soon after, she began avoiding public attention. Williams managed to track down Freed in order to profile her, but had difficulty pitching the story to publications. She settled on hosting the story herself online, including a PayPal link to support the story through a pay what you want pricing strategy. She described the project as an example of "Radiohead journalism," referencing the model used to release the band's album In Rainbows. After 39 days, 160 readers had donated a total of $1,500. However, Williams concluded the visitor to donation ratio made the model unsustainable.

=== "Bones of Contention" ===
"Bones of Contention" was originally published in the January 28, 2013 issue of The New Yorker. The inspiration for the story came to Williams after she read an article in a Montana newspaper about an incidence of fossil theft Williams' article details fossil trader Eric Prokopi's efforts to sell a Tarbosaurus bataar skeleton. Mongolian President Tsakhiagiin Elbegdorj filed suit against Prokopi, claiming the fossils had been smuggled from a Mongolian dig site.

Prokopi says the fossils had been shipped to him by British dealer Chris Moore, who listed the skeleton's origin as Great Britain on customs forms. Because of the investment Prokopi had made to refurbishing the fossils, seizure by the Mongolian government threatened to destroy his business. He responded by making a legal claim on the specimen. The stand-off ended when "about two dozen federal agents and sheriff's deputies arrived at [the estate], got Prokopi out of bed, and arrested him on three counts involving smuggling." Prokopi pleaded guilty to mislabeling the skeleton and was subsequently forced to forfeit his claim.

Williams says she first approached the story "from a crime angle but then got completely sucked in by the science." Much of her pre-reporting for the story involved examining paleontological texts and legal documents that included Prokopi's case file and building permit for his fossil workshop. Her reporting fieldwork for the piece involved shooting photographs and video of paleontological excavations in Wyoming, South Dakota and Badlands National Park for references.

After the publication of the New Yorker article, Williams sold the pitch for The Dinosaur Artist to Hachette Book Group. The book would expand on Prokopi's story to further examine the world of black-market fossil sales.

== Awards and honors ==
- 1997 Nieman Fellowship
- 2008 National Magazine Award
- 2015 MacDowell Colony's James S. Carroll Fellowship

== Bibliography ==
=== Books ===
- Williams, Paige (2018). The Dinosaur Artist: Obsession, Science, and the Global Quest for Fossils. New York: Hachette Books. ISBN 9780316382533. OCLC 1043403360.

=== Essays and reporting ===
- "The tallest trophy : a movie star made off with an Alaskan totem pole. Would it ever return home?". Our Far-Flung Correspondents. The New Yorker. 91 (9): 36–44. April 20, 2015.
- "Say cheese". The Talk of the Town. Influencers. The New Yorker. 94 (43): 17. January 7, 2019.
- "Hired hooves". The Talk of the Town. The Out-of-Towners. The New Yorker. 95 (14): 22–23. May 27, 2019.

=== Critical studies and reviews of Williams' work ===
The dinosaur artist

- "'The Dinosaur Artist' dusts off the debate over who should own fossils". NPR.org.
- "Geek out over fossils with Paige Williams, author of The Dinosaur Artist". 5280. September 12, 2018.
- "Jurassic Intrigue: PW Talks with Paige Williams". PublishersWeekly.com.
