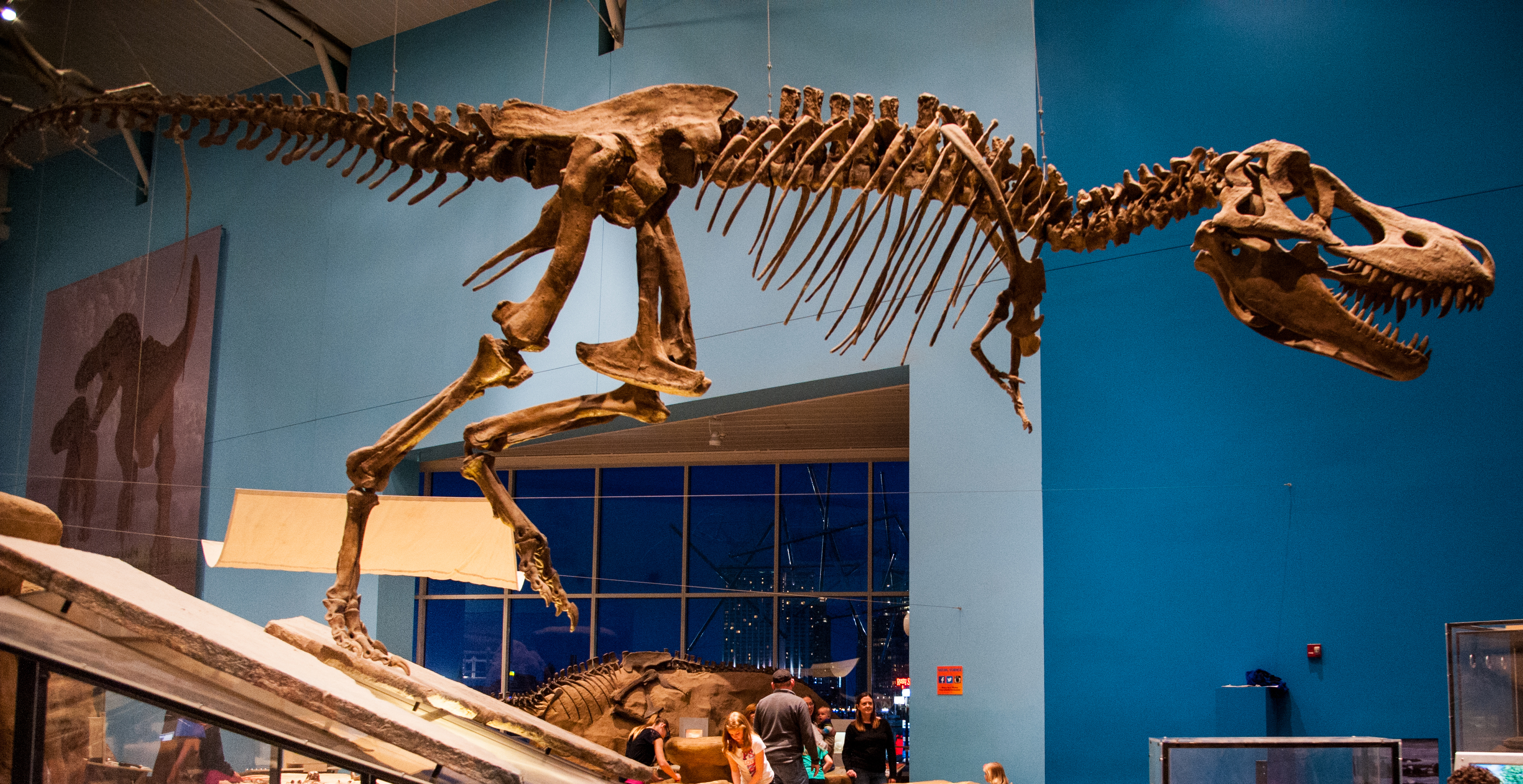
- Skeleton on exhibit in Maryland Science Center

Scientific classification
- Kingdom: Animalia
- Phylum: Chordata
- Class: Reptilia
- Clade: Dinosauria
- Clade: Saurischia
- Clade: Theropoda
- Superfamily: †Tyrannosauroidea
- Family: †Tyrannosauridae
- Tribe: †Tyrannosaurini
- Genus: †Tarbosaurus; Maleev, 1955b
- Species: †T. bataar

Binomial name
- †Tarbosaurus bataar (Maleev, 1955a)

Synonyms
- Genus synonymy: Shanshanosaurus Dong, 1977; "Maleevosaurus" Pickering, 1984 (nomen nudum); Maleevosaurus Carpenter, 1992; Jenghizkhan Olshevsky, Ford & Yamamoto, 1995; ?Raptorex Sereno et al., 2009; ?Asiatyrannus Zheng et al., 2024; Species synonymy: Tyrannosaurus bataar Maleev, 1955a; Gorgosaurus novojilovi Maleev, 1955b; Tarbosaurus efremovi Maleev, 1955b; Gorgosaurus lancinator Maleev, 1955b; Deinodon novojilovi (Maleev, 1955b) Kuhn, 1965; Deinodon lancinator (Maleev, 1955b) Kuhn, 1965; Aublysodon lancinator (Maleev, 1955b) Charig, 1967; Aublysodon novojilovi (Maleev, 1955b) Charig, 1967; Shanshanosaurus huoyanshanensis Dong, 1977; Tyrannosaurus efremovi (Maleev, 1955b) Rozhdestvensky, 1977; Tarbosaurus novojilovi (Maleev, 1955b) Olshevsky, 1978; ?Tyrannosaurus "turpanensis" Zhai et al., 1978; ?Tyrannosaurus luanchuanensis Dong, 1979; "Maleevosaurus" novojilovi (Maleev, 1955b) Pickering, 1984; Aublysodon huoyanshanensis (Dong, 1977) Paul, 1988a; Albertosaurus novojilovi (Maleev, 1955b) Mader & Bradley, 1989; ?Tarbosaurus "turpanensis" (Zhai et al., 1978) Olshevsky, 1991; ?Tarbosaurus luanchuanensis (Dong, 1979) Olshevsky, 1991; Maleevosaurus novojilovi (Maleev, 1955b) Carpenter, 1992; Jenghizkhan bataar (Maleev, 1955a) Olshevsky, Ford & Yamamoto, 1995; ?Jenghizkhan luanchuanensis (Dong, 1979) Olshevsky, Ford & Yamamoto, 1995; Tyrannosaurus novojilovi (Maleev, 1955b) Glut, 1997; ?Raptorex kriegsteini Sereno et al., 2009; ?Asiatyrannus xui Zheng et al., 2024

= Tarbosaurus =

Tarbosaurus Temporal range: Late Cretaceous, Maastrichtian

Tyrannosaurid dinosaur genus from Late Cretaceous of Mongolia

Tarbosaurus (/ˌtɑːrbəˈsɔːrəs/ TAR-bə-SOR-əs; meaning "alarming lizard") is a genus of large tyrannosaurid dinosaur that lived in Asia during the Maastrichtian age of the Late Cretaceous period. It contains the type and single species Tarbosaurus bataar, which is known from the Nemegt Formation of Mongolia, with more fragmentary remains found further afield in the Subashi Formation of China. Tarbosaurus is represented by dozens of fossil specimens, including several complete skulls and skeletons. These remains have allowed studies focusing on its phylogeny, skull mechanics, and brain structure. Further fossil remains have been reported from other geologic formations of Asia, however, these remains are fragmentary and cannot be confidently assigned to Tarbosaurus or the type species.

Like most known tyrannosaurids, Tarbosaurus was a large bipedal predator, with the largest specimens measuring 10–12 metres (33–39 ft) and weighing up to 4.5–5 metric tons (4.4–4.9 long tons; 5.0–5.5 short tons). It had a unique locking mechanism in its jaw, equipped with about sixty large teeth, and the smallest arms relative to body size of all tyrannosaurids, renowned for their disproportionately tiny, two-fingered hands.

Although many species have been named, most modern paleontologists recognize only one species, T. bataar. Some experts see this species as an Asian representative of the North American genus Tyrannosaurus, which would make the genus Tarbosaurus redundant. Tarbosaurus and Tyrannosaurus, if not synonymous, are considered to be very closely related genera. Alioramus, also from Mongolia, has previously been thought by some authorities to be the closest relative of Tarbosaurus, though this has since been disproven with the discovery of Qianzhousaurus and the description of the tyrannosaurine tribe Alioramini.

Tarbosaurus lived in a humid floodplain dominated by deserts, forests, and plains, and criss-crossed by river channels. It was an apex predator in this environment, preying on other large dinosaurs including ankylosaurids, such as Tarchia and Saichania, hadrosaurids, such as Saurolophus and Barsboldia, and sauropods, such as Nemegtosaurus and Opisthocoelicaudia.

== Discovery and naming ==
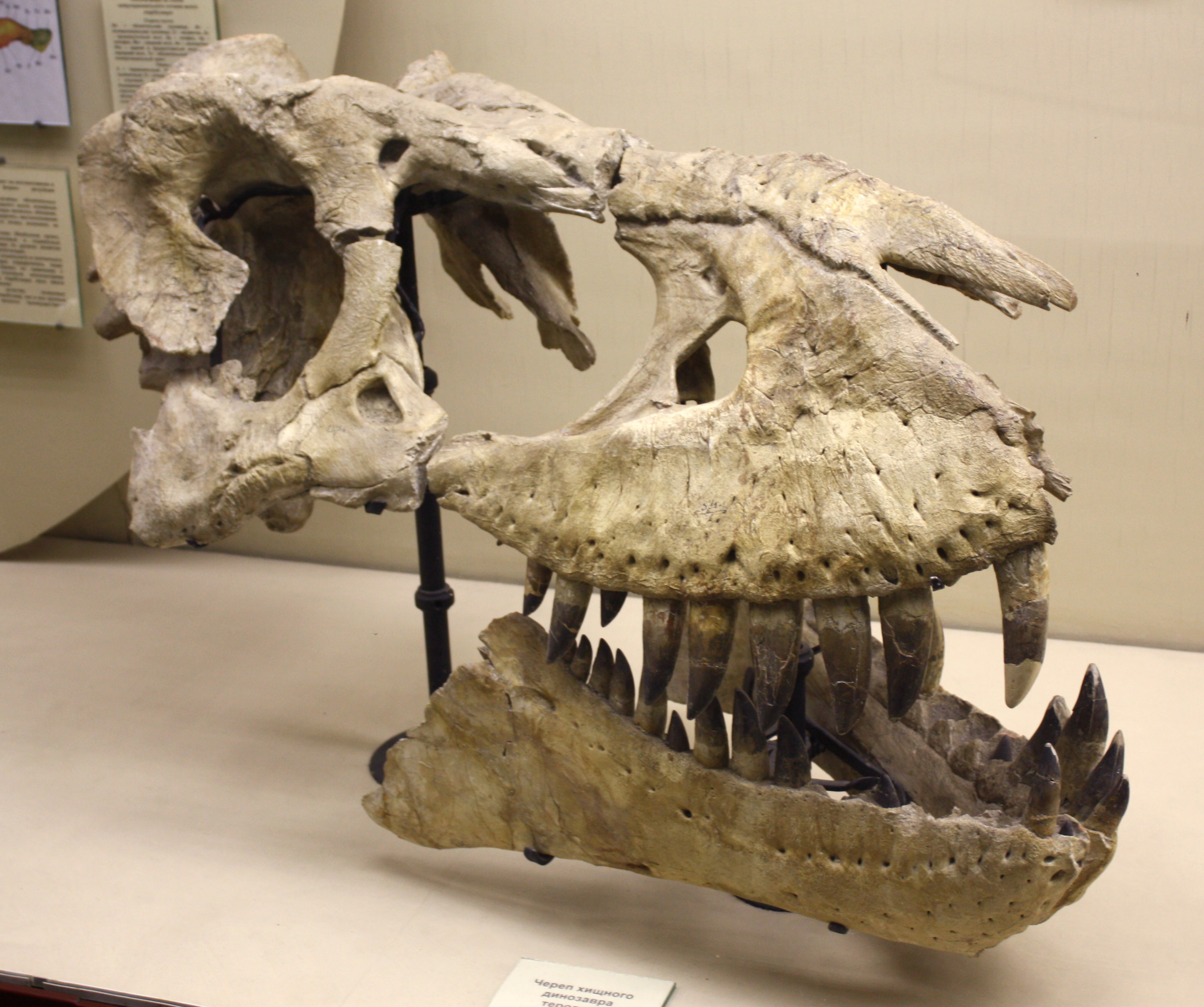
Holotype skull PIN 551–1, Museum of Paleontology, Moscow

In 1946, a joint Soviet-Mongolian expedition to the Gobi Desert in the Ömnögovi Province turned up a large theropod skull and some vertebrae from the Nemegt Formation. In 1955, Evgeny Maleev, a Soviet paleontologist, made this specimen the holotype (PIN 551–1) of a new species, which he called Tyrannosaurus bataar. The specific name is a misspelling of the Mongolian word баатар/baatar, meaning "hero". In the same year, Maleev also described and named three new theropod skulls, each associated with skeletal remains discovered by the same expedition in 1948 and 1949. The first of these, PIN 551–2, was named Tarbosaurus efremovi, a new generic name composed of the Ancient Greek words τάρβος (tarbos), meaning "terror", "alarm", "awe", or "reverence", and σαυρος (sauros), meaning "lizard", and the species was named after Ivan Yefremov, a Russian paleontologist and science fiction author. The other two, PIN 553-1 and PIN 552–2, were also named as new species and assigned to the North American genus Gorgosaurus as G. lancinator and G. novojilovi, respectively. All three of these latter specimens are smaller than the first.

A 1965 paper by A. K. Rozhdestvensky recognized all of Maleev's specimens as different growth stages of the same species, which he believed to be distinct from the North American Tyrannosaurus. He created a new combination, Tarbosaurus bataar, to include all the specimens described in 1955 and newer material. Later authors, including Maleev himself, agreed with Rozhdestvensky's analysis, although some used the name Tarbosaurus efremovi instead of T. bataar.

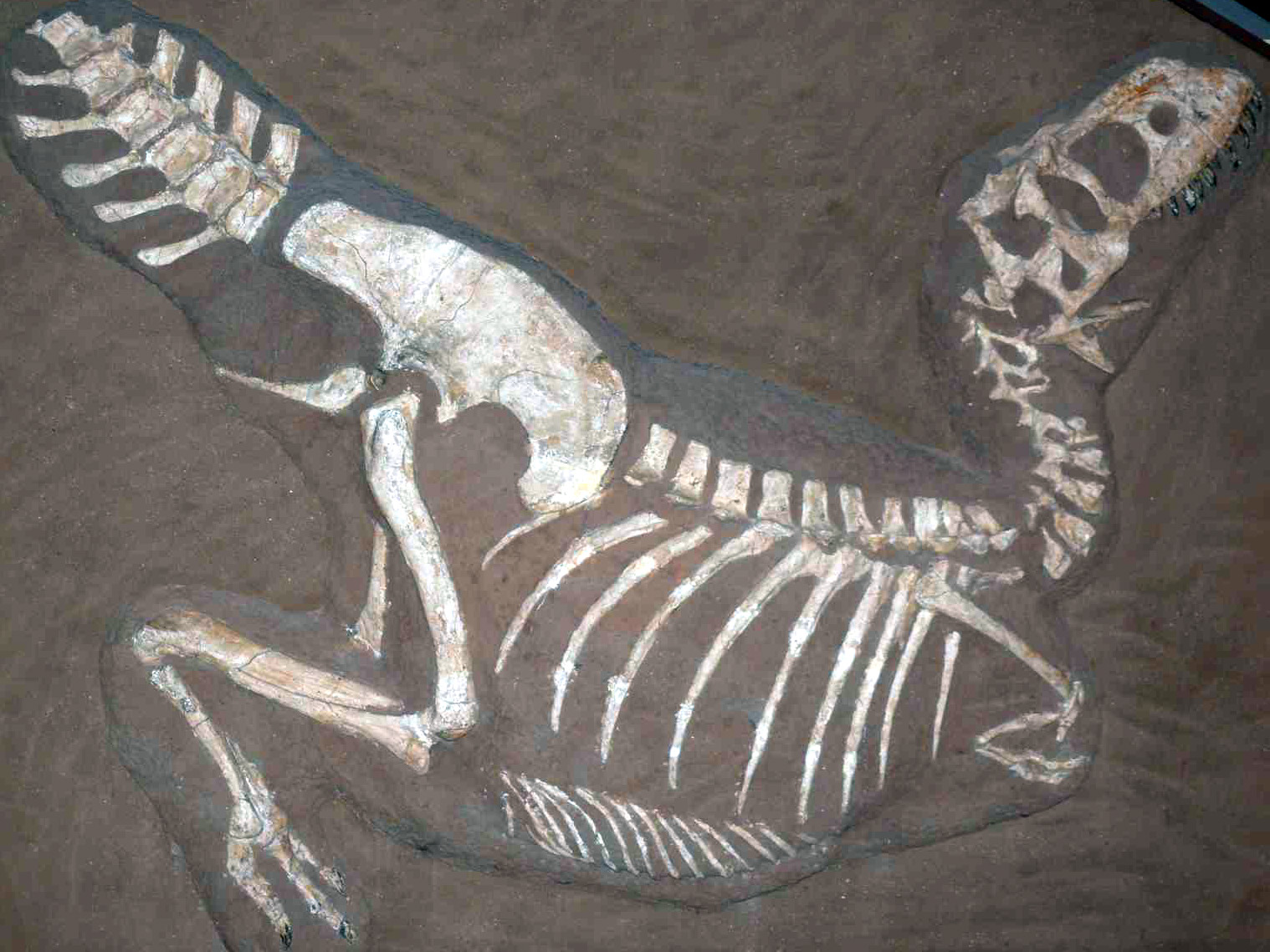
Cast of specimen ZPAL MgD-I/3, a nearly complete skeleton found in 1964, in death pose

American paleontologist Ken Carpenter re-examined the material in 1992. He concluded that it belonged to the genus Tyrannosaurus, as originally published by Maleev, and lumped all the specimens into the species Tyrannosaurus bataar (except the remains that Maleev had named Gorgosaurus novojilovi). Carpenter thought this specimen represented a separate, smaller genus of tyrannosaurid, which he called Maleevosaurus novojilovi. George Olshevsky, Tracy Ford and Seiji Yamamoto created the new generic name Jenghizkhan (after Genghis Khan) for Tyrannosaurus bataar in 1995, while also recognizing Tarbosaurus efremovi and Maleevosaurus novojilovi, for a total of three distinct, contemporaneous genera from the Nemegt Formation. A 1999 study subsequently reclassified Maleevosaurus as a juvenile Tarbosaurus. Most research published since 1999 recognizes only a single species, which is either called Tarbosaurus bataar or Tyrannosaurus bataar, although some scholars suspect that there could be a second species.

After the original Soviet-Mongolian expeditions in the 1940s, Polish-Mongolian joint expeditions to the Gobi Desert began in 1963 and continued until 1971, recovering many new fossils, including new specimens of Tarbosaurus from the Nemegt Formation. Expeditions involving Japanese and Mongolian scientists between 1993 and 1998, as well as private expeditions hosted by Canadian paleontologist Phil Currie around the turn of the 21st century, discovered and collected even more Tarbosaurus material. More than 30 specimens are known, including more than 15 skulls and several complete postcranial skeletons.

=== Synonyms ===
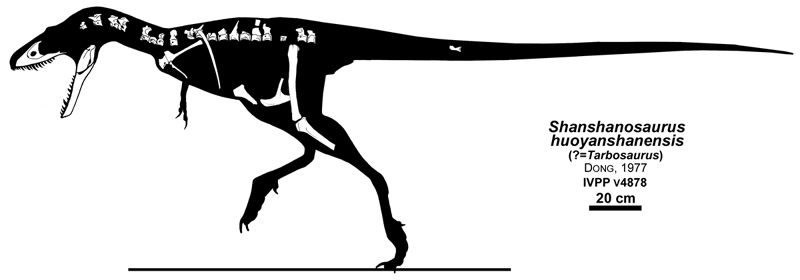
Skeletal diagram of IVPP V4878, described as Shanshanosaurus huoyanshanensis

Chinese paleontologists discovered a partial skull and skeleton of a small theropod (IVPP V4878) in the Xinjiang Autonomous Region of China in the mid-1960s. In 1977, Dong Zhiming described this specimen, which was recovered from the Subashi Formation in Shanshan County, as a new genus and species, Shanshanosaurus huoyanshanensis. Gregory S. Paul recognized Shanshanosaurus as a tyrannosaurid in 1988, referring it to the dubious genus Aublysodon. Dong and Currie later re-examined the specimen and deemed it to be a juvenile of a larger species of tyrannosaurine. These authors refrained from assigning it to any particular genus, but suggested Tarbosaurus as a possibility. Subsequent authors have provisionally accepted S. houyanshanensis as a synonym of Tarbosaurus bataar.

Type skull and skeleton of Shanshanosaurus huoyanshanensis, National Natural History Museum of China

Riabinin (1930b) described several fragments from the Yuliangze Formation of Heilongjiang, China as Albertosaurus periculosus. In the first edition of The Dinosauria, Molnar et al. (1990) listed A. periculosus as a provisional synonym of Tarbosaurus bataar, as followed by Holtz (2004) in the second edition. Olshevsky, Ford, and Yamamoto (1995) tentatively referred A. periculosus to Tarbosaurus, listing it as Tarbosaurus? periculosus. Alifanov and Bolotsky (2002) referred material from the neighboring Urduchukan Formation of Amur, Russia, to this taxon, but Bolotsky (2015) later regarded A. periculosus as a nomen dubium.

Zhai et al. (1978) listed material from the Subashi Formation as Tyrannosaurus turpanensis. Since the specific name "turpanensis" was published in a faunal list only and lacks a description, it is a nomen nudum according to ICZN Article 13.1. Olshevsky (1991) listed T. "turpanensis" under the combination Tarbosaurus "turpanensis." Several fragments from the Subashi Formation described by Dong (1977) as Tarbosaurus sp. may represent this taxon. As with Albertosaurus periculosus, Molnar et al. (1990) listed T. "turpanensis" as a provisional synonym of Tarbosaurus bataar without comment, as did Holtz (2004).

Dong (1979) described five teeth (IVPP V4733) discovered in the Quipa Formation of Henan, China as a new species, Tyrannosaurus luanchuanensis. Olshevsky (1991) listed it as Tarbosaurus luanchuanensis, and later in 1995, with Ford and Yamamoto, as Jenghizkhan luanchuanensis. Holtz (2004) listed it as a provisional synonym of Tarbosaurus bataar.

Along with Albertosaurus periculosus, Tyrannosaurus luanchuanensis, and Tyrannosaurus "turpanensis," Chingkankousaurus fragilis was considered a provisional junior synonym of Tarbosaurus bataar by Holtz (2004), but it has since been assessed as dubious by Brusatte et al. (2013).

Named in 1976 by Sergei Kurzanov, Alioramus is another genus of tyrannosaurid from slightly older sediments in Mongolia. Several analyses have concluded Alioramus was quite closely related to Tarbosaurus. It was described as an adult, but its long, low skull is characteristic of a juvenile tyrannosaurid. This led Currie to speculate that Alioramus might represent a juvenile Tarbosaurus, but he noted that the much higher tooth count and row of crests on top of the snout suggested otherwise.

=== Additional specimens ===
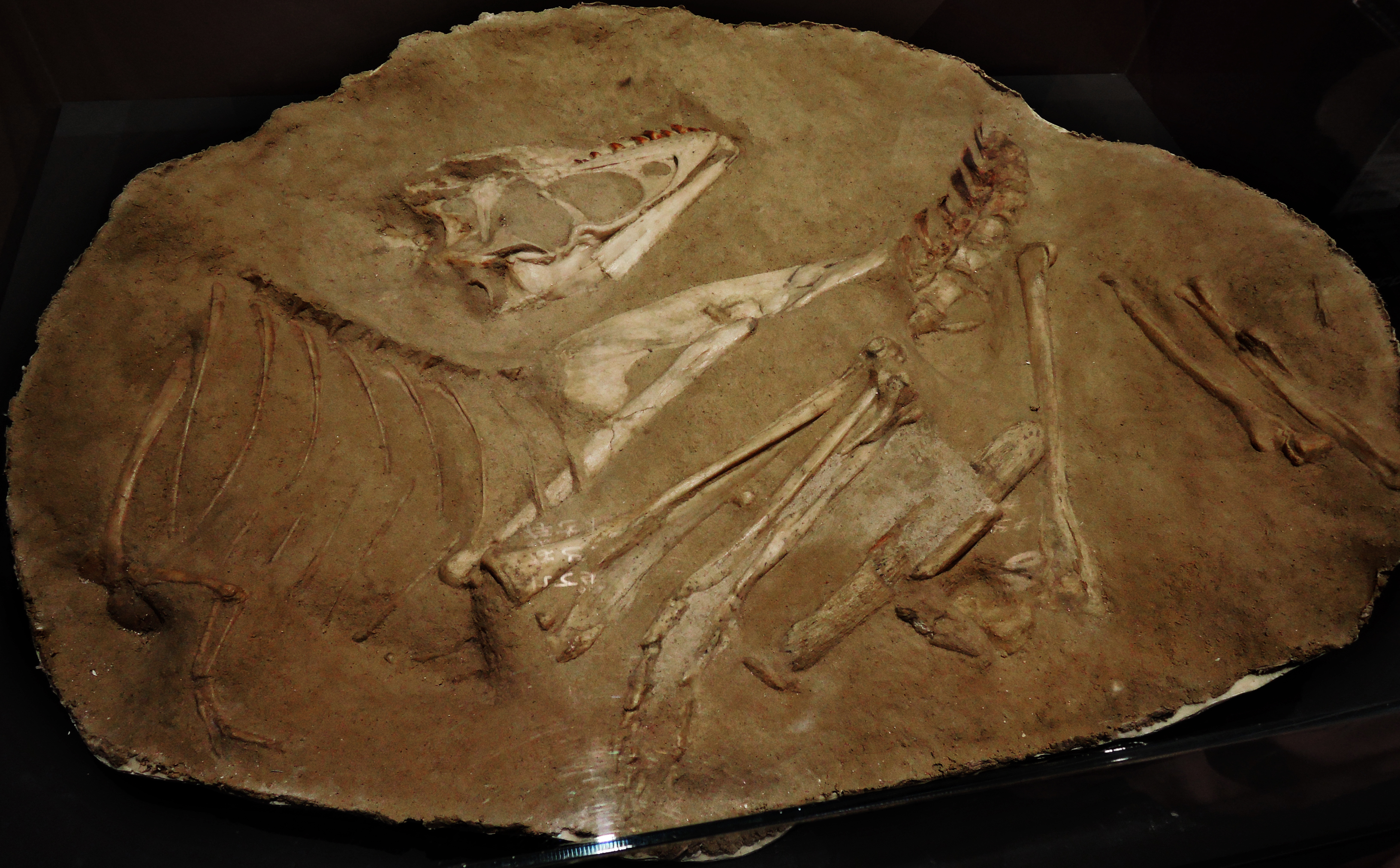
Juvenile Tarbosaurus specimen MPC-D 107/7

In 1979 Dong Zhiming described several dinosaur remains from the strata of South China, reporting teeth, a dorsal vertebra, and several fragmentary foot bones of a tyrannosaurid. He tentatively referred these to Tarbosaurus sp. given some similarities in tooth morphology as well as the general geographic proximity to the Nemegt Formation. In 1993 Tomasz Jerzykiewiczz examined the general outcrops from the Bayan Mandahu Formation of China. In this paper, he reported isolated tyrannosaurid premaxillary and maxillary teeth, which he assigned to Tarbosaurus without anatomical comparisons. Lev A. Nessov in 1995 reported a partial femur from the Bostobe Formation of Kazakhstan and referred it as Tarbosaurus sp. without any diagnosis.

In 2004, David B. Weishampel and team listed a dubious Tarbosaurus? sp. as a component of the known dinosaur taxa of the Campanian-aged Djadokhta Formation without further ado. Despite this referral, scattered, and very sparse tyrannosaurid remains are occasionally found in the strata of the Djadokhta Formation of Mongolia and none of these remains have ever been diagnostically assigned to Tarbosaurus or even T. bataar. In addition, the extreme conditions of the Djadokhta Formation suggest that the remains of tyrannosaurids and other large-bodied dinosaurs from this unit represent passing by taxa foreign to the region.

During a large fossil prospection led by the Hayashibara Museum of Natural Sciences-Mongolian Paleontological Center Joint Expedition, a juvenile tyrannosaurid was discovered in 2006 from the highly fossiliferous Bügiin Tsav locality where adult specimens of Tarbosaurus have been recovered. The specimen was found preserving a partial skeleton with a fairly complete skull. In 2011 this juvenile was formally described and referred to Tarbosaurus bataar, cataloged as MPC-D 107/7 within the collections of the Mongolian Paleontological Center.

=== Poached specimens ===
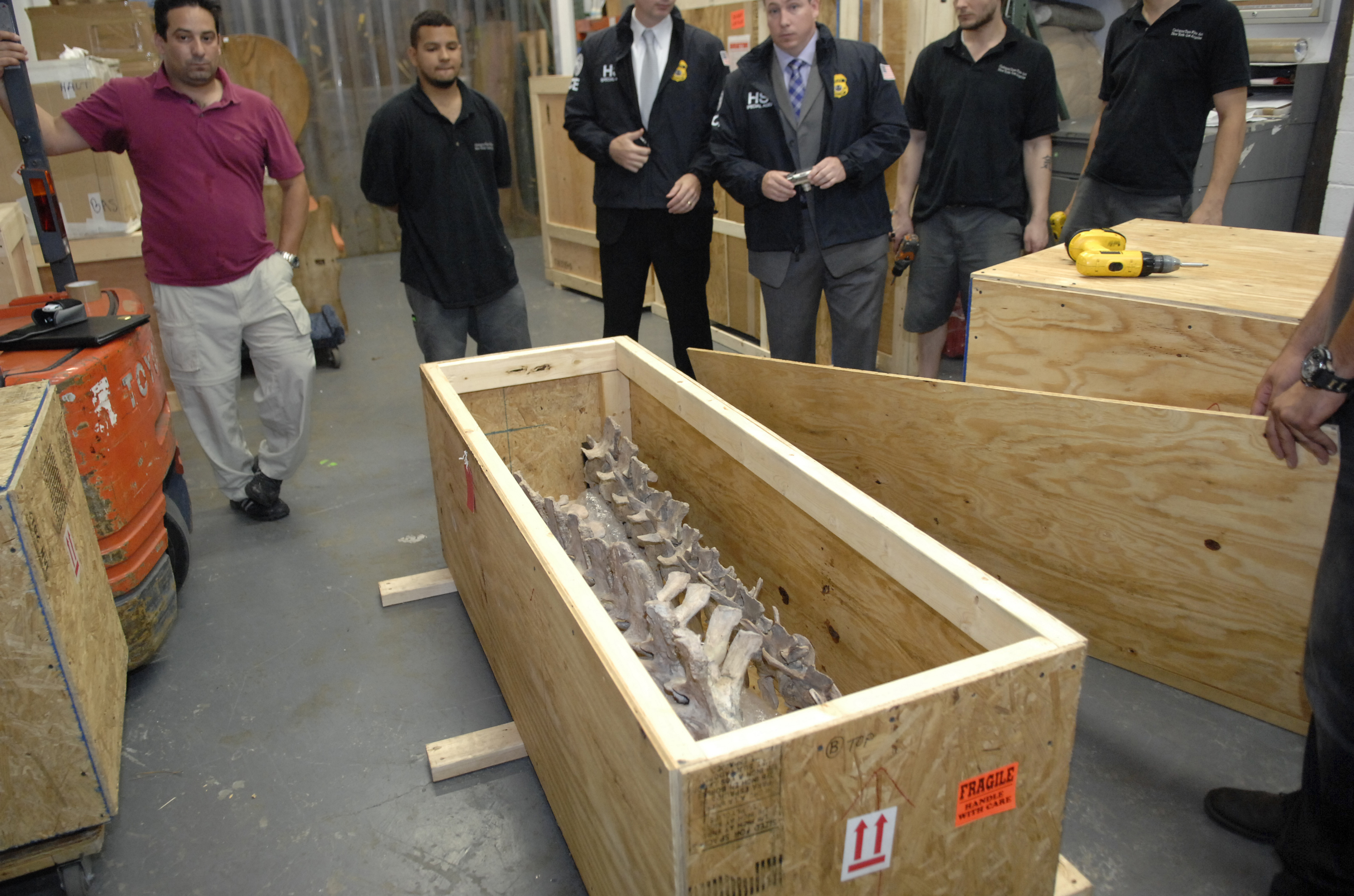
Tarbosaurus fossils that were smuggled to the US, and subsequently returned to Mongolia, at New York

Tarbosaurus fossils are only found around the Gobi Desert of Mongolia and China, both of which ban their export, though some specimens have been looted by private collectors. A $1 million smuggling deal was uncovered when suspicions were raised about a catalog put out by Heritage Auctions for an event in New York City on May 20, 2012. By Mongolian law, any specimen found in the Gobi Desert was to rest at an appropriate Mongolian institution and there was little reasonable doubt that the Tarbosaurus bataar advertised on the catalog was a stolen one. The president of Mongolia and many paleontologists raised objections to the sale, which led to a last-minute investigation that confirmed that it was a specimen that can only be found in the Gobi Desert, rightfully belonging to Mongolia. During the court case (United States v. One Tyrannosaurus Bataar Skeleton), Eric Prokopi, the smuggler, pleaded guilty to illegal smuggling and the dinosaur was returned to Mongolia in 2013, where it is temporarily displayed on Sukhbaatar Square, the center of the city of Ulaanbaatar. Prokopi had sold the dinosaur with a partner and fellow commercial hunter in England named Christopher Moore. The case led to the repatriation of dozens of Mongolian dinosaurs, including several skeletons of Tarbosaurus bataar. In January 2026, France returned another Tarbosaurus specimen that French customs had seized in 2015 to Mongolia.

=== Skin impressions and footprints ===
Skin impressions were recovered from a large skeleton at the Bugiin Tsav locality that was subsequently destroyed by poachers. These impressions show non-overlapping scales with an average diameter of 2.4 millimeters (0.094 in) and pertain to the thoracic region of the individual, although the exact position can no longer be assessed due to the destruction of the skeleton.

Phil Currie and colleagues (2003) described two footprints from the Nemegt locality that probably pertain to Tarbosaurus. These tracks represent natural casts, which means that only the sandy infill of the tracks, not the tracks themselves, are preserved. The better-preserved track features skin impressions over large areas on and behind the toe impressions that are similar to those discovered in Bugiin Tsav. It also features vertical parallel slide marks that were left by scales when the foot was pushed into the ground. The track measures 61 centimeters (24 in) in length, thus representing a large individual. The second track, although even larger, was affected by erosion and does not show any detail.

In 1997, Ken Carpenter reported a damaged Tarbosaurus skull with impressions of a dewlap or throat pouch beneath the lower jaws, based on a personal communication from Konstantin Mikhailov. Carpenter speculated that the pouch may have been used for display, possibly being brightly colored and inflatable like a frigatebird's. In a 2019 communication to Mickey Mortimer, Mikhailov confirmed that this specimen had not been collected because it was on a heavy stone slab. He revealed that it had been discovered by Sergei Kurzanov and that it was Kurzanov himself who had originally interpreted the impressions as a throat structure. This specimen may be the same as one that was purportedly destroyed by poachers in 1992.

== Description ==
Size comparison of specimens representing various growth stages

Although slightly smaller than Tyrannosaurus, Tarbosaurus was one of the largest tyrannosaurines, with the largest specimens 10–12 metres (33–39 ft) long and weighing up to 4.5–5 metric tons (5.0–5.5 short tons). Other adult specimens were smaller such, ZPAL.MgD-I/4 and PIN 552-1 likely weighed around 2.2 metric tons (2.4 short tons) to 3.4 metric tons (3.7 short tons). The specimen MPC-D 107/2 was over 10 metres (33 ft) in length and weighed 5 metric tons. The largest known Tarbosaurus skull is about 1.35 m (4.4 ft) long, which is larger than that of all other tyrannosaurids, aside from Tyrannosaurus.

=== Skull ===
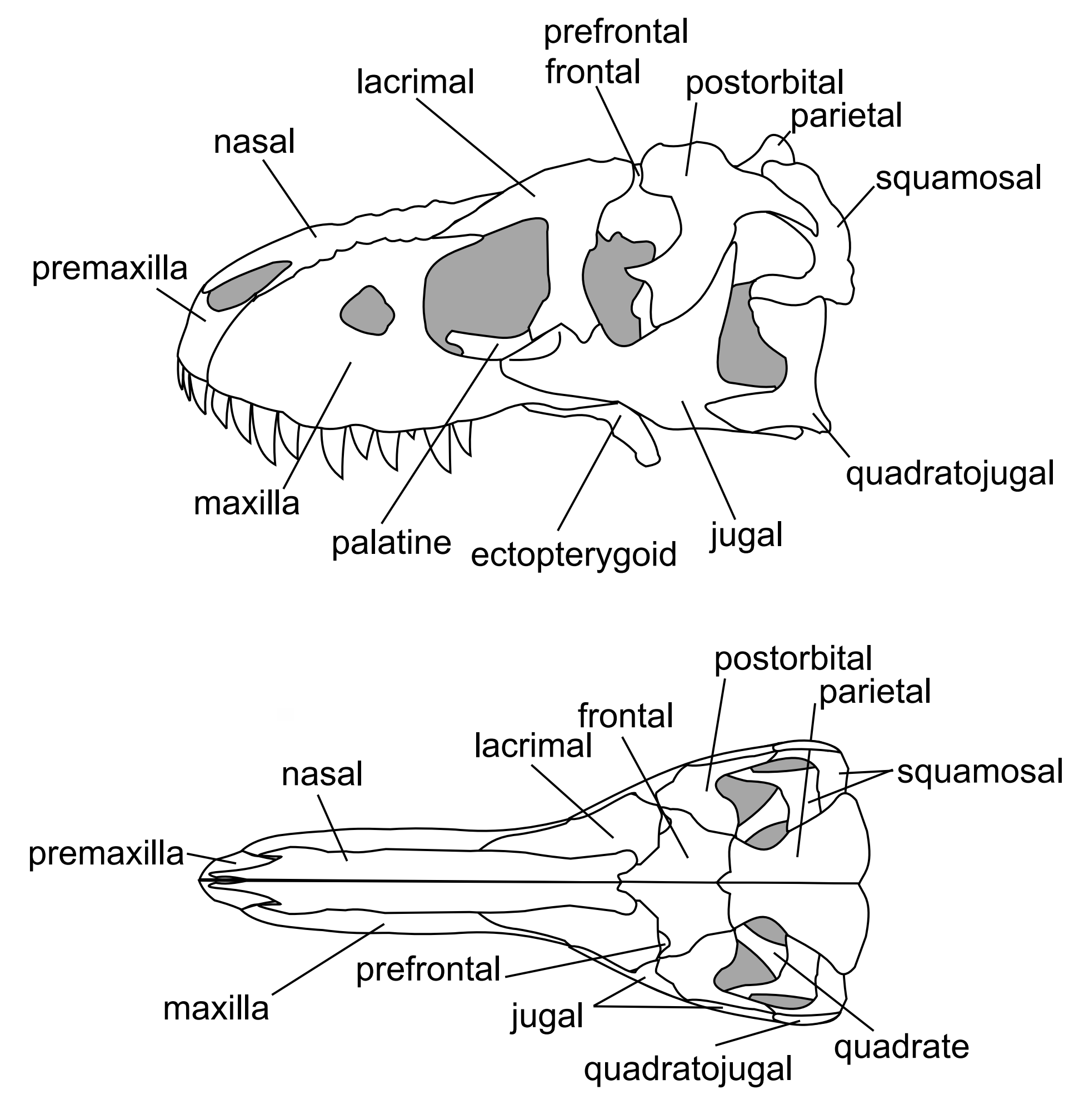
Labelled skull diagram of specimen ZPAL MgD−I/4

The skull was tall, like that of Tyrannosaurus, but not as wide, especially towards the rear. The unexpanded rear of the skull meant that Tarbosaurus' eyes did not face directly forwards, suggesting that it lacked the binocular vision of Tyrannosaurus. Large fenestrae in the skull reduced its overall weight and served as attachment points for muscles. Between 58 and 64 teeth lined its jaws. This tooth count is slightly more than that of Tyrannosaurus, but fewer than in smaller tyrannosaurids, like Gorgosaurus and Alioramus.

Most of its teeth were ovular in cross section, although the teeth of the premaxilla at the tip of the upper jaw had a D-shaped cross section. However, this heterodonty is characteristic of the family. The longest teeth were in the maxilla (upper jaw bone), with crowns up to 11.2 centimeters (4.4 in) long. In the lower jaw, a ridge on the outer surface of the angular bone articulated with the rear of the dentary bone, creating a locking mechanism unique to Tarbosaurus and Alioramus. Other tyrannosaurids lacked this ridge and had more flexibility in the lower jaw.

=== Postcranial skeleton ===
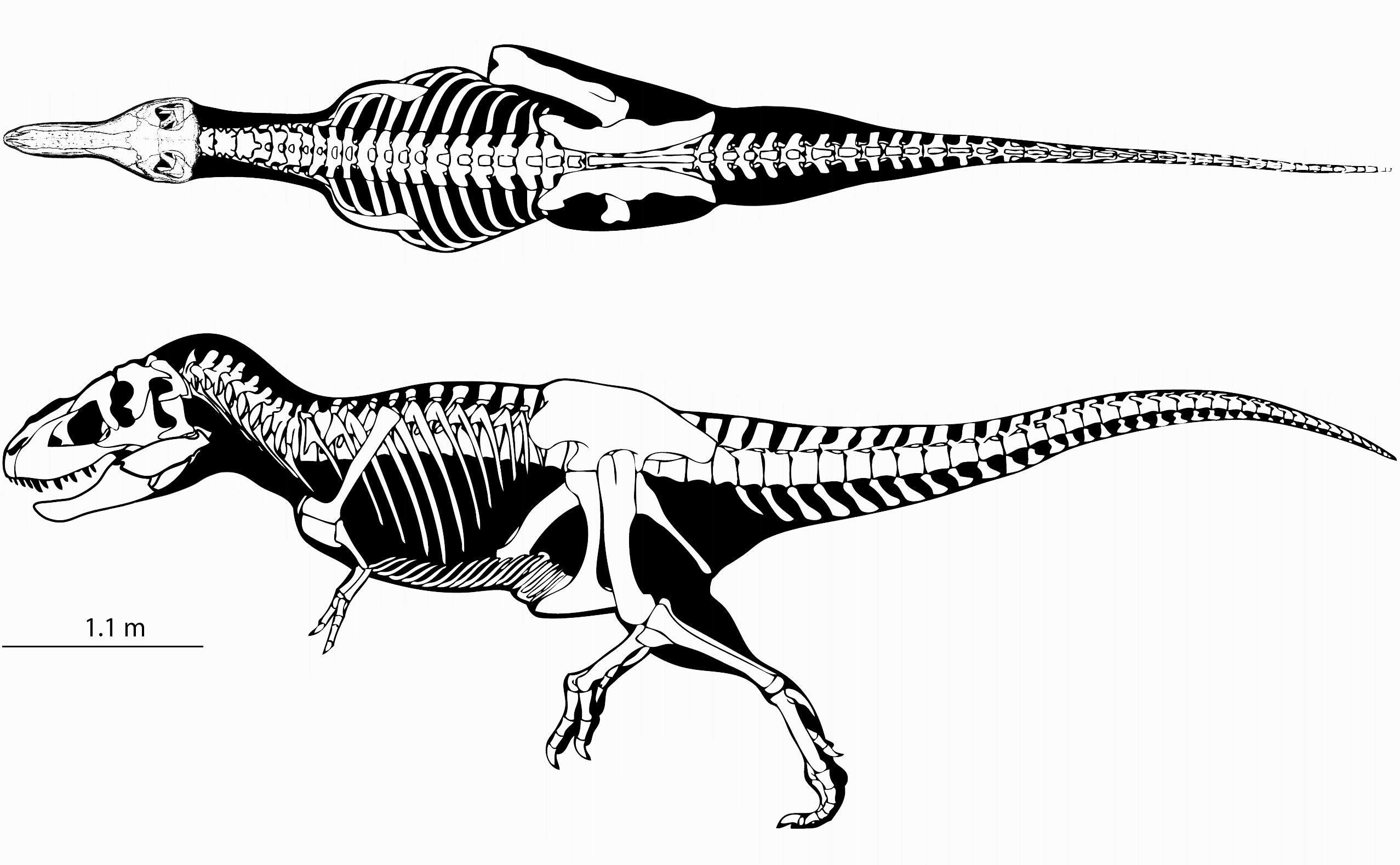
Skeletal reconstruction (ZPAL MgD I/4)

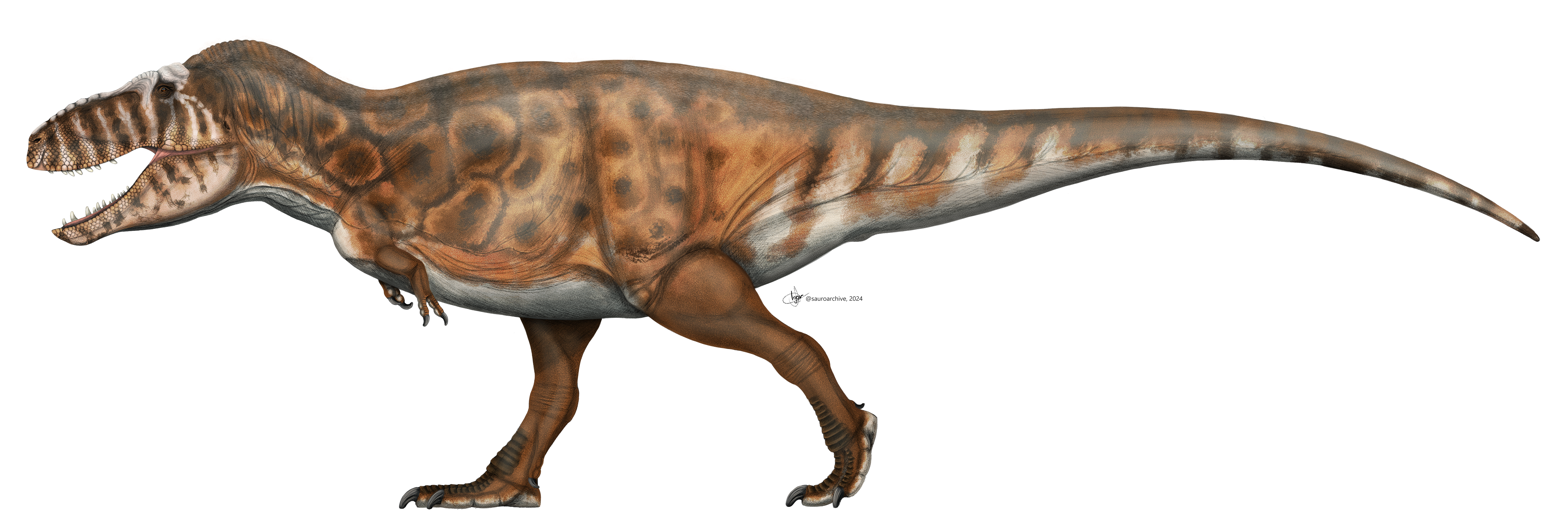
Life restoration

Tyrannosaurids varied little in overall body form and Tarbosaurus was no exception. The head was supported by an S-shaped neck, while the rest of the vertebral column, including the tail, was held horizontally. Tarbosaurus had tiny arms, proportionably to body size the smallest of all members in the family. The hands had two clawed digits each, with an additional unclawed third metacarpal found in some specimens, similar to those of closely related genera. Holtz has suggested that Tarbosaurus also has a theropod reduction of fingers IV-I "developed further" than in other tyrannosaurids, as the second metacarpal in the Tarbosaurus specimens he studied is less than twice the length of the first metacarpal. Other tyrannosaurids have a second metacarpal about twice the length of the first metacarpal. Also, the third metacarpal in Tarbosaurus is proportionally shorter than in other tyrannosaurids. In other tyrannosaurids, like Albertosaurus and Daspletosaurus, the third metacarpal is often longer than the first metacarpal, while in the Tarbosaurus specimens studied by Holtz, the third metacarpal is shorter than the first. In contrast to the arms, the three-toed legs were long, thick, and muscular to support the body in a bipedal posture. The long, heavy tail served as a counterweight to the head and torso, while also placing the center of gravity directly over the hips.

== Classification ==
Tarbosaurus is classified as a theropod in the subfamily Tyrannosaurinae of the family Tyrannosauridae. Other members include Tyrannosaurus and the earlier Daspletosaurus, both from North America, and possibly the Mongolian genus Alioramus. Animals in this subfamily are more closely related to Tyrannosaurus than to Albertosaurus and are known for their robust build with proportionally larger skulls and longer femurs than in the other subfamily, Albertosaurinae.

Tarbosaurus bataar was originally described as a species of Tyrannosaurus, an arrangement that has been supported by some more recent studies. Others prefer to keep the genera separate, while still recognizing them as sister taxa. A 2003 cladistic analysis based on skull features instead identified Alioramus as the closest known relative of Tarbosaurus, as the two genera share skull characteristics that are related to stress distribution and are not found in other tyrannosaurines. If proven, this relationship would argue against Tarbosaurus being a synonym of Tyrannosaurus and would suggest that separate tyrannosaurine lineages evolved convergently in Asia and North America. The two known specimens of Alioramus, which show juvenile characteristics, are not likely juvenile individuals of Tarbosaurus because of their much higher tooth count (76 to 78 teeth) and their unique row of bony bumps along the top of their snouts.

The discovery of Lythronax argestes, a much earlier tyrannosaurine, further reveals the close relationship between Tyrannosaurus and Tarbosaurus. It was also discovered that Lythronax is a sister taxon to a clade consisting of Campanian genus Zhuchengtyrannus, and the Maastrichtian genera Tyrannosaurus and Tarbosaurus. Further studies of Lythronax also suggest that the Asian tyrannosauroids were part of one evolutionary radiation.

Below is the cladogram of Tyrannosaurinae based on the phylogenetic analysis conducted by Voris and team in 2020.

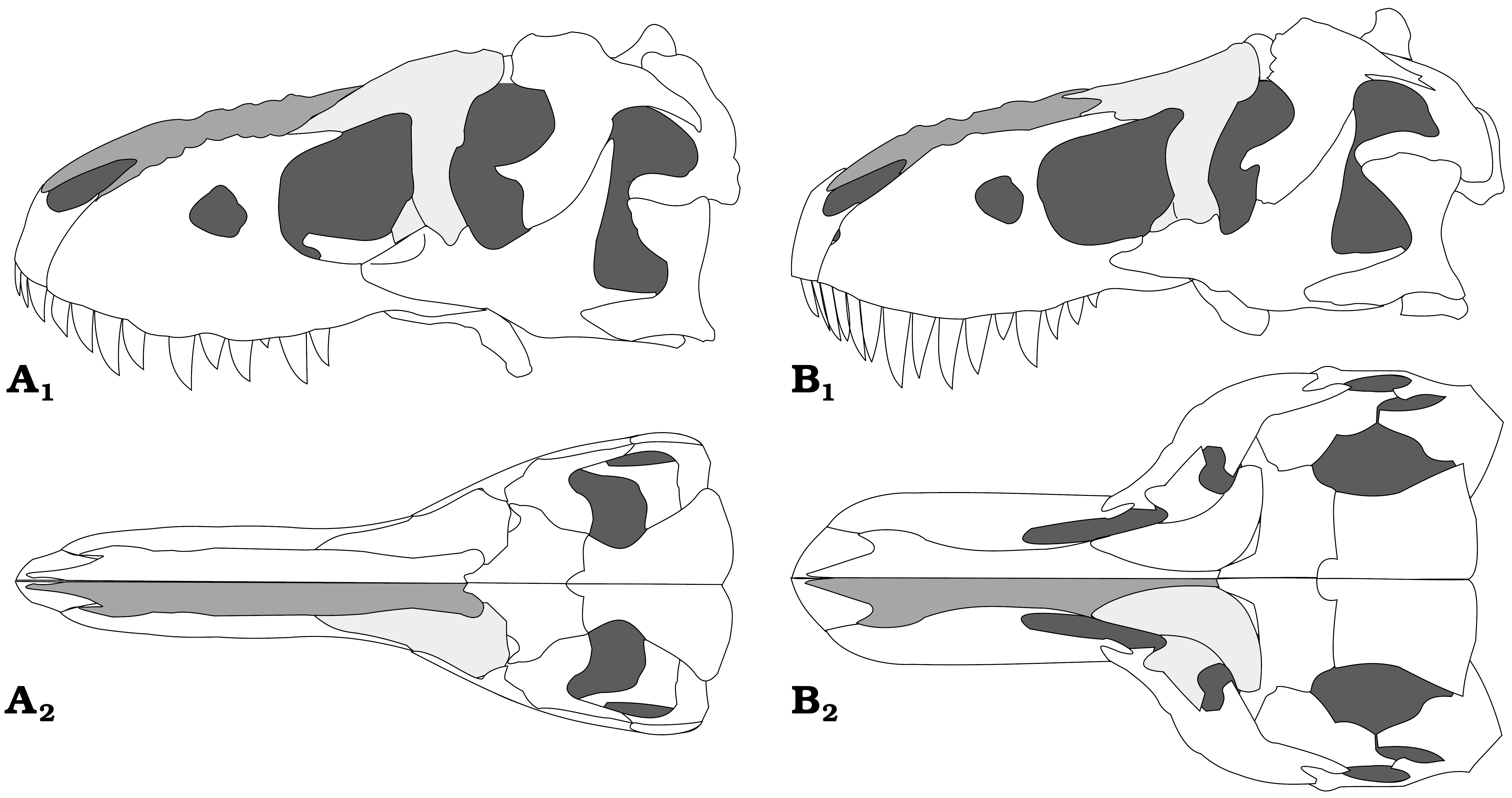
Diagram showing the differences between a generalized Tarbosaurus (A) and Tyrannosaurus (B) skull

- Tyrannosaurinae
  - Alioramini
    - Qianzhousaurus sinensis
    - - Alioramus remotus
      - Alioramus altai
  - - - Teratophoneus curriei
      - Dynamoterror dynastes
      - Lythronax argestes
    - - Nanuqsaurus hoglundi
      - - - Daspletosaurini
            - Thanatotheristes degrootorum
            - - Daspletosaurus torosus
              - Daspletosaurus horneri
          - - Zhuchengtyrannus magnus
            - - Tarbosaurus bataar
              - Tyrannosaurus rex

== Paleobiology ==
=== Ontogeny ===
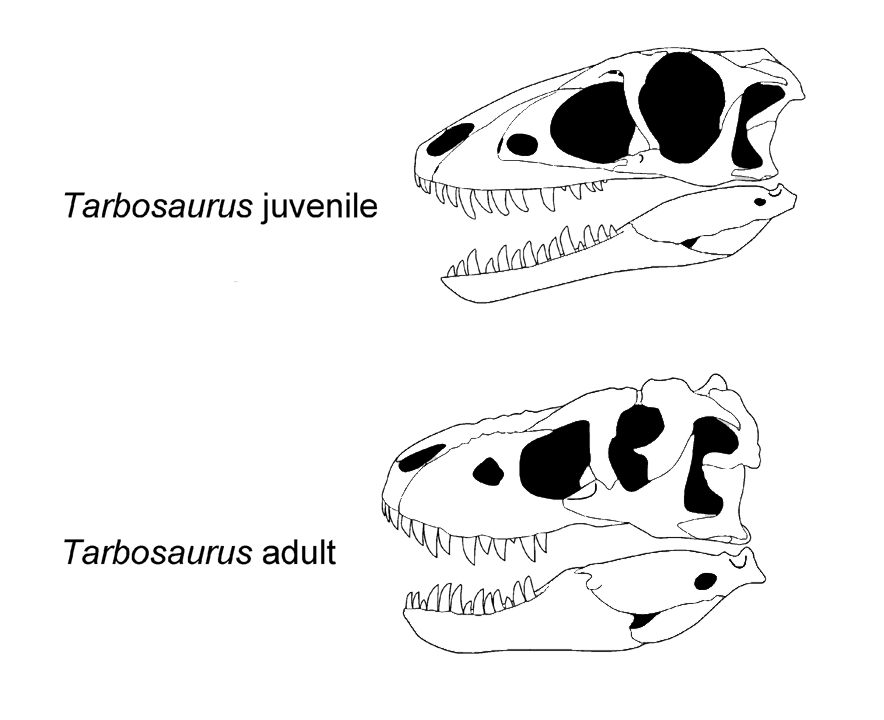
Skull of juvenile (top, MPC-D 107/7), and adult (bottom, ZPAL MgD I/4)

Most specimens of Tarbosaurus represent adult or subadult individuals, while juveniles remain very rare. Nevertheless, the 2006 discovery of a juvenile individual (MPC-D 107/7) with a complete, 290-millimeter (0.95 ft) long skull was reported and described in 2011, providing information on the life history of this dinosaur. This individual was probably 2 to 3 years old at the time of death. Compared to adult skulls, the juvenile skull was weakly constructed and the teeth were thin, indicating different food preferences in juveniles and adults that reduced competition between different age groups. Examination of the sclerotic rings in this juvenile Tarbosaurus suggests they may also have been crepuscular or nocturnal hunters. Whether or not the adult Tarbosaurus were also nocturnal is currently unknown due to the lack of fossil evidence to suggest so. Ontogenetic changes identified in the frontal bones suggests that the allometric growth of Tarbosaurus was similar to that of North American tyrannosaurids.

=== Senses ===
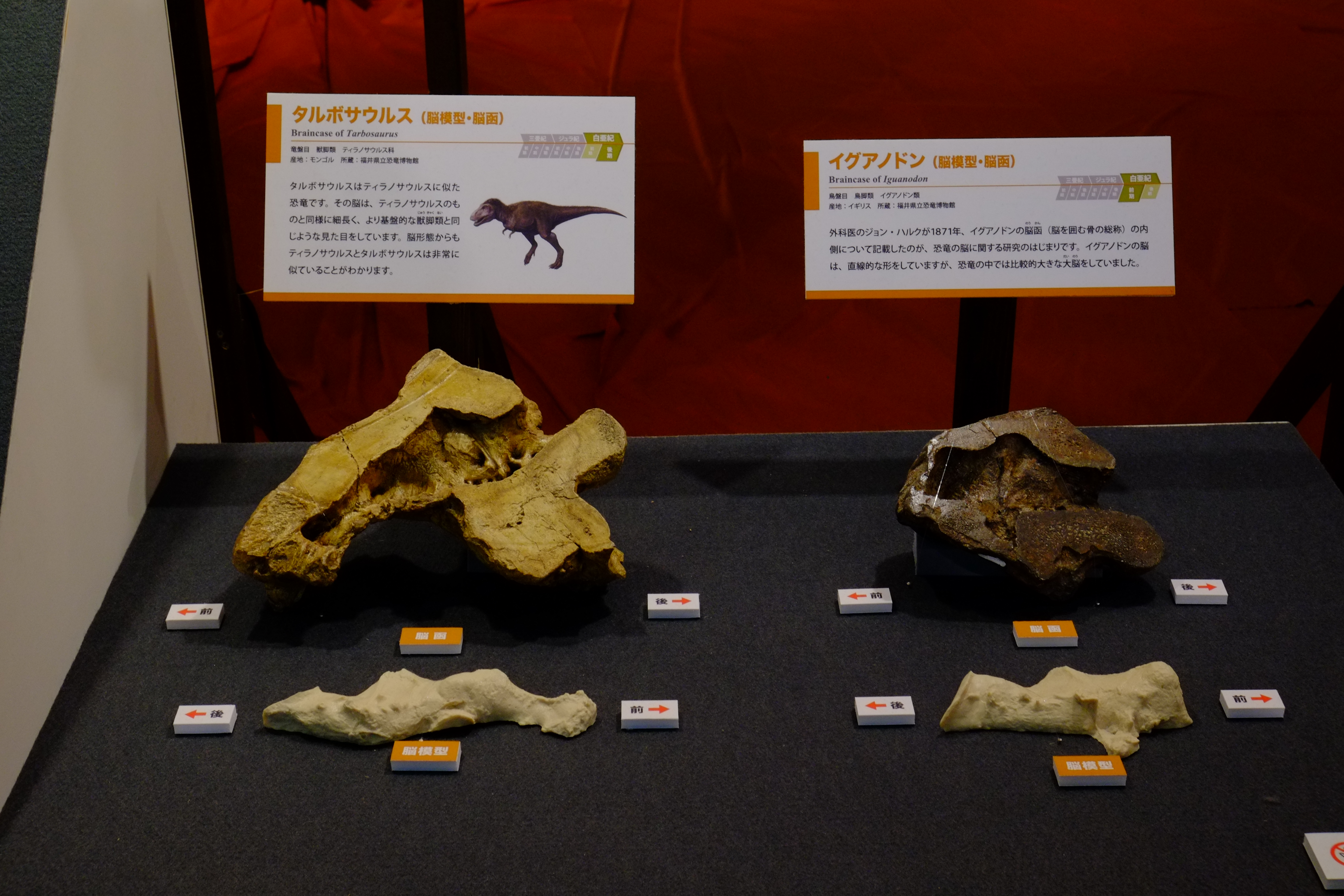
Braincase of Tarbosaurus (left) next to the braincaise of Iguanodon (right)

A Tarbosaurus skull found in 1948 by Soviet and Mongolian scientists (PIN 553–1, originally called Gorgosaurus lancinator) included the skull cavity that held the brain. Making a plaster cast, called an endocast, of the inside of this cavity allowed Maleev to make preliminary observations about the shape of a Tarbosaurus brain. A newer polyurethane rubber cast allowed a more detailed study of Tarbosaurus brain structure and function.

The endocranial structure of Tarbosaurus was similar to that of Tyrannosaurus, differing only in the positions of some cranial nerve roots, including the trigeminal and accessory nerves. Tyrannosaurid brains were more similar to those of crocodilians and other nonavian reptiles than they were to birds. The total brain volume for a 12 meters (39 ft) long Tarbosaurus is estimated at only 184 cubic centimeters (11.2 cu in).

The large size of the olfactory bulbs, as well as the terminal and olfactory nerves, suggest that Tarbosaurus had a highly keen sense of smell, as was also the case with Tyrannosaurus. The vomeronasal bulb is large and differentiated from the olfactory bulb, which was initially suggested as being indicative of a well-developed Jacobsen's organ, which was used to detect pheromones. This may imply that Tarbosaurus had complex mating behavior. However, the identification of the vomeronasal bulb has been challenged by other researchers because they are not present in any living archosaurs.

The auditory nerve was also large, suggesting good hearing, which may have been useful for auditory communication and spatial awareness. The nerve had a well-developed vestibular component as well, which implies a good sense of balance and coordination. In contrast, the nerves and brain structures associated with eyesight were smaller and undeveloped. The midbrain tectum, responsible for visual processing in reptiles, was very small in Tarbosaurus, as were the optic nerve and the oculomotor nerve, which controls eye movement. Unlike Tyrannosaurus, which had forward-facing eyes that provided accurate binocular vision, Tarbosaurus had a narrower skull more typical of other tyrannosaurids in which the eyes faced primarily sideways. All of this suggests that Tarbosaurus relied more on its senses of smell and hearing than on its eyesight. It has been suggested that the lack of binocular vision in Asian tyrannosaurs, like Tarbosaurus, might have been correlated with a greater amount of scavenging resources provided by sauropod carcasses, which might have afforded them a less active predatory lifestyle when compared to the North American forms, meaning they would need less predatory adaptations. However, this is contradicted by numerous lines of evidence indicating Tarbosaurus was actively preying on hadrosaurs, titanosaur sauropods, and other large bodied herbivores in its ecosystem.

=== Skull mechanics ===
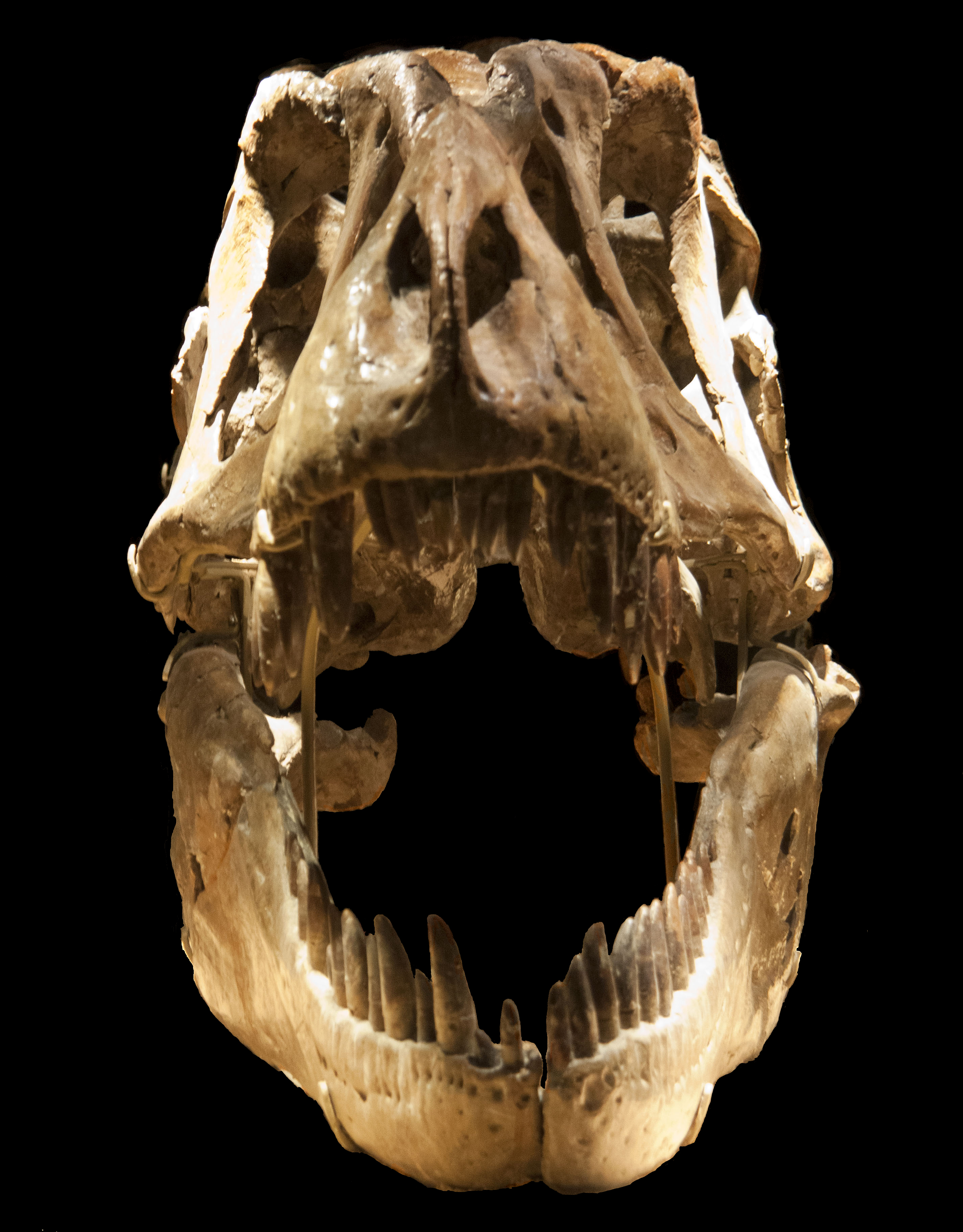
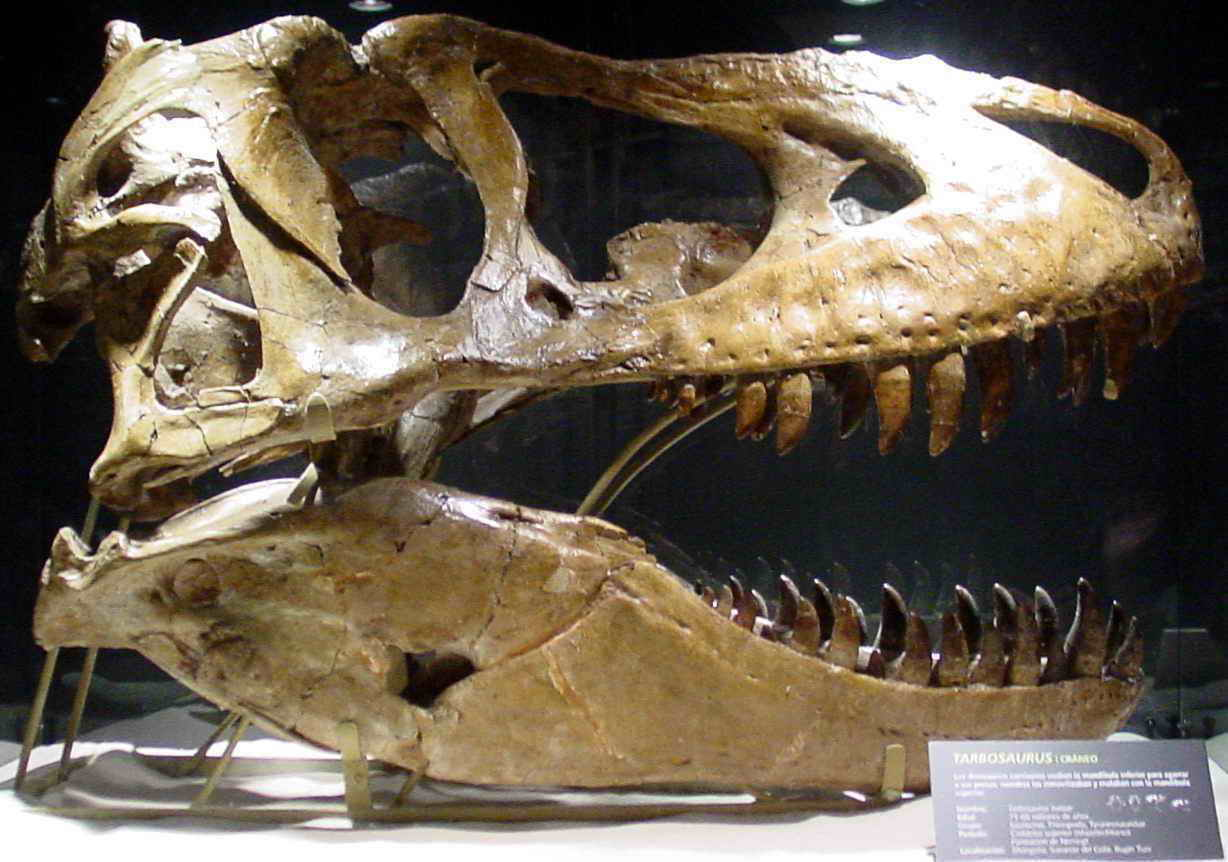
Skull from the front and right

The skull of Tarbosaurus was completely described for the first time in 2003. Scientists noted key differences between Tarbosaurus and the North American tyrannosaurids. Many of these differences are related to the handling of stress by the skull bones during a bite. When the upper jaw bit down on an object, force was transmitted up through the maxilla, the primary tooth-bearing bone of the upper jaw, into surrounding skull bones. In North American tyrannosaurids, this force went from the maxilla into the fused nasal bones on top of the snout, which were firmly connected in the rear to the lacrimal bones by bony struts. These struts locked the two bones together, suggesting that force was then transmitted from the nasals to the lacrimals.

Tarbosaurus lacked these bony struts and the connection between the nasals and lacrimals was weak. Instead, a backwards projection of the maxilla was massively developed in Tarbosaurus and fit inside a sheath formed from the lacrimal. This projection was a thin, bony plate in North American tyrannosaurids. The large backwards projection suggests that force was transmitted more directly from the maxilla to the lacrimal in Tarbosaurus. The lacrimal was also more firmly anchored to the frontal and prefrontal bones in Tarbosaurus. The well-developed connections between the maxilla, lacrimal, frontal, and prefrontal would have made its entire upper jaw much more rigid.

Another major difference between Tarbosaurus and its North American relatives was its more rigid mandible. While many theropods, including North American tyrannosaurids, had some degree of flexibility between the bones in the rear of the mandible and the dentary in the front, Tarbosaurus had a locking mechanism formed from a ridge on the surface of the angular, which articulated with a square process on the rear of the dentary.

Some scientists have hypothesized that the more rigid skull of Tarbosaurus was an adaptation to hunting the massive titanosaurid sauropods found in the Nemegt Formation, which did not exist in most of North America during the Late Cretaceous. The differences in skull mechanics also affect tyrannosaurid phylogeny. Tarbosaurus-like articulations between the skull bones are also seen in Alioramus from Mongolia, suggesting that it is the closest relative of Tarbosaurus. Similarities between Tarbosaurus and Tyrannosaurus might therefore be related to their large size, independently developed through convergent evolution.

=== Bite force and feeding ===
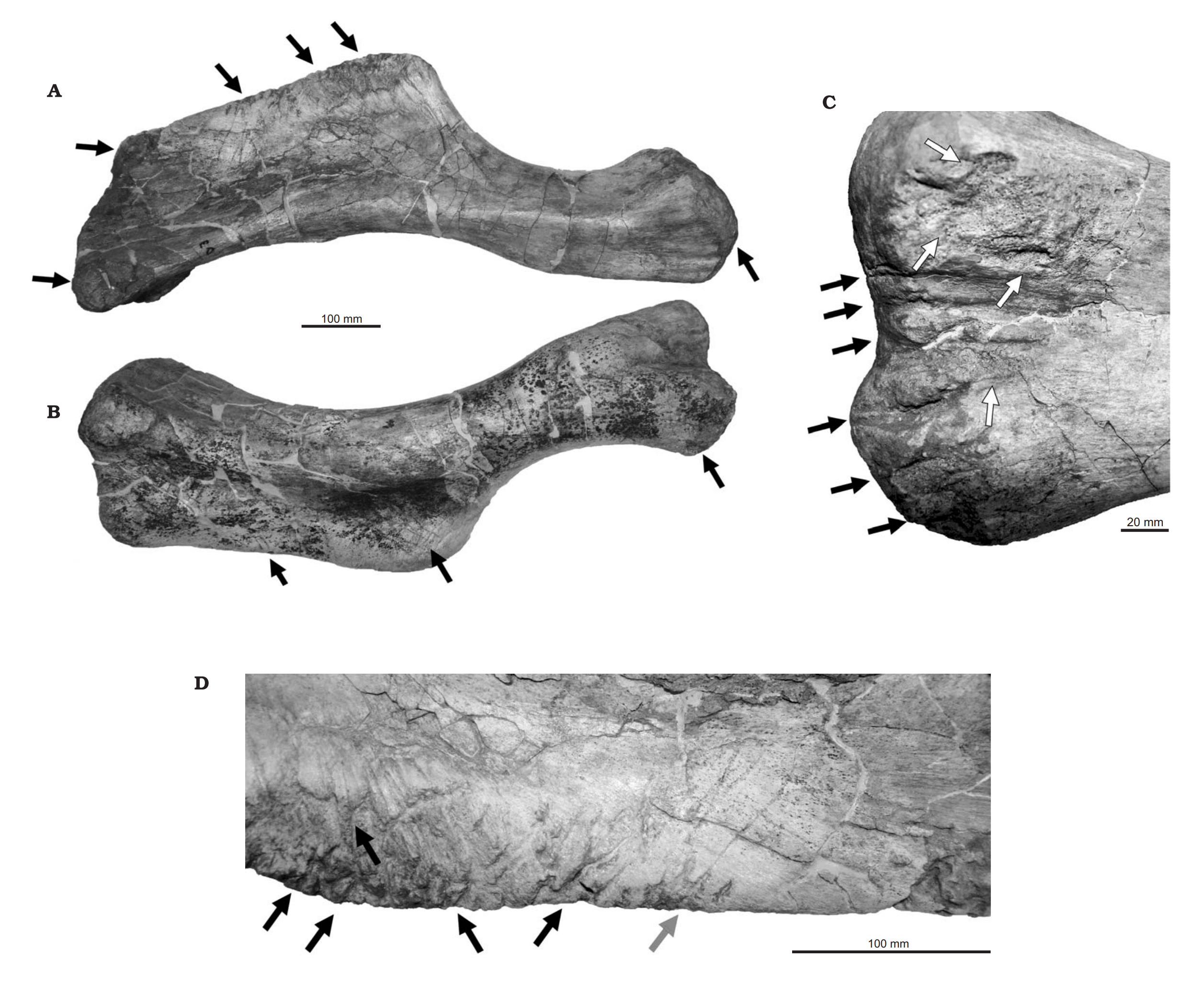
Left humerus of S. angustirostris MPC-D 100/764, showing multiple bite marks attributed to Tarbosaurus

In 2001, Bruce Rothschild and others published a study examining evidence for stress fractures and tendon avulsions in theropod dinosaurs and the implications for their behavior. Since stress fractures are caused by repeated trauma rather than singular events, they are more likely to be caused by regular behavior than other types of injuries. None of the eighteen Tarbosaurus foot bones examined in the study were found to have a stress fracture, but one of the ten examined hand bones was found to have one. Stress fractures in the hands have special behavioral significance compared to those found in the feet, since stress fractures there can be obtained while running or during migration. Hand injuries, by contrast, are more likely to be obtained while in contact with struggling prey. The presence of stress fractures and tendon avulsions, in general, provide evidence for a "very active" predation-based diet instead of obligate scavenging.

As for its bite force, it was revealed in 2005 that Tarbosaurus had a bite force of around 8,000 to 10,000 pounds per square inch of force, meaning that it could crush bones just like its North American relative, Tyrannosaurus.

David W. E. Hone and Mahito Watabe in 2011 reported the left humerus of a nearly complete Saurolophus skeleton (MPC-D 100/764) from the Bügiin Tsav locality of the Nemegt Formation, which was heavily damaged from bite marks attributed to Tarbosaurus. As suggested by the lack of damage to the rest of the skeleton (such as large wounds in skeletal remains indicative of predation), this tyrannosaurid was likely scavenging an already dead Saurolophus. It is unlikely that a large-bodied predator, such as Tarbosaurus, would have left sparse feeding traces on a single humerus when having an entire carcass to feed on. The humerus shows three distinctive feeding methods, interpreted as punctures, drag marks, and bite−and−drag marks. Hone and Watabe noted that bite marks were mostly located at the deltopectoral crest, suggesting that this Tarbosaurus was actively selecting which biting style to employ so it could scavenge the bone.

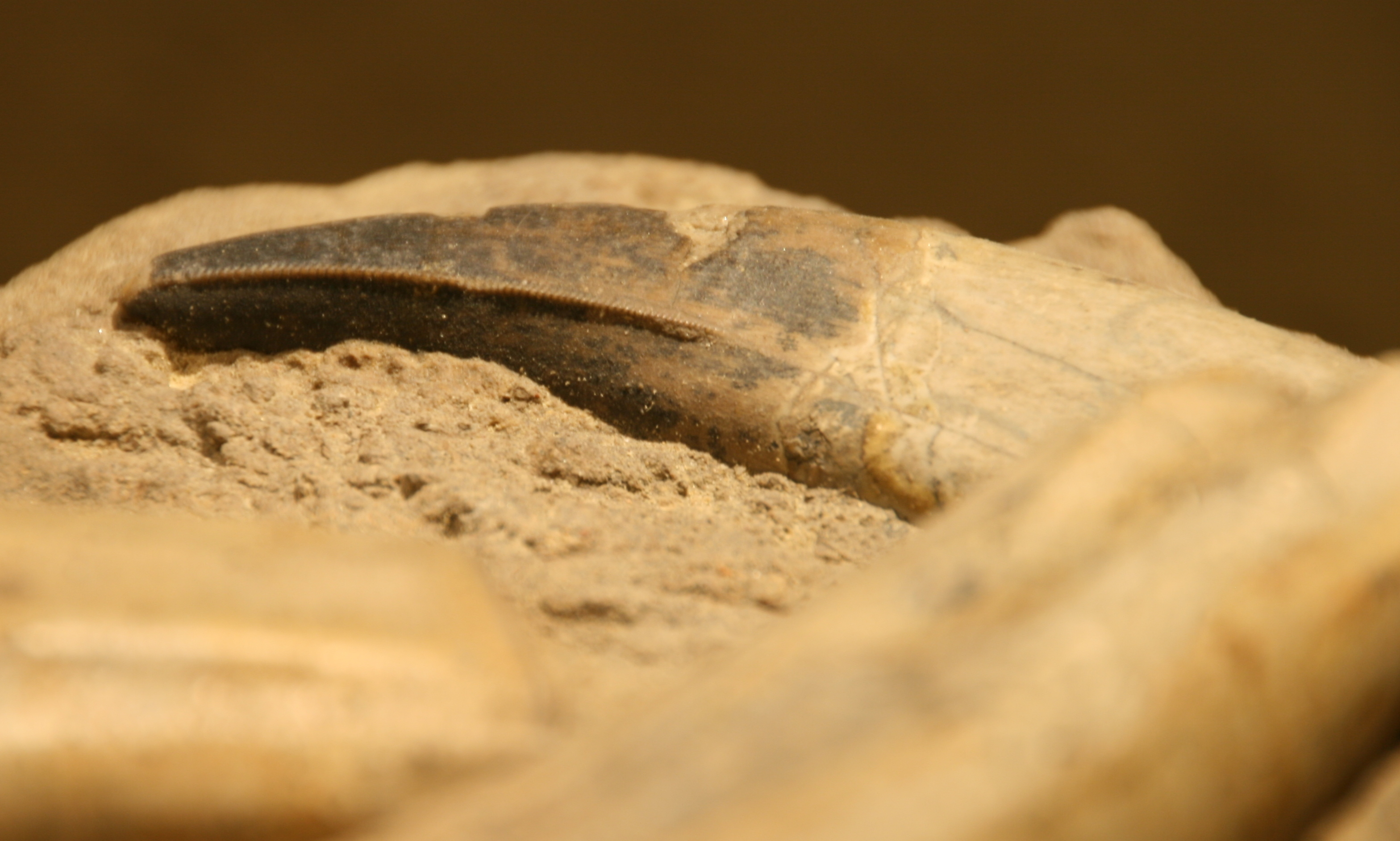
Teeth of specimen MPC-D 100/6 featuring serrations

In 2012, bite marks on two fragmentary gastralia of the holotype specimen of the large ornithomimosaur Deinocheirus mirificus were reported. The size and shape of the bite marks match the teeth of Tarbosaurus, the largest known predator from the Nemegt Formation. Various types of feeding traces were identified. These include punctures, gouges, striae, fragmentary teeth, and combinations of the above marks. The bite marks probably represent feeding behavior instead of aggression between the species and the fact that bite marks were not found elsewhere on the body indicates the predator focused on internal organs. Tarbosaurus bite marks have also been identified on hadrosaur and sauropod fossils, but theropod bite marks on bones of other theropods are very rare in the fossil record. In addition, a wound found on a Tarchia skull may have been inflicted by a Tarbosaurus. The ankylosaur would have survived the attack but eventually succumbed to a pathology in the healing process.

A 2020 study involving stable isotopes found that Tarbosaurus primarily hunted large dinosaurs in its environment, most notably titanosaurs and hadrosaurs.

== Paleoenvironment ==
=== Nemegt Formation ===
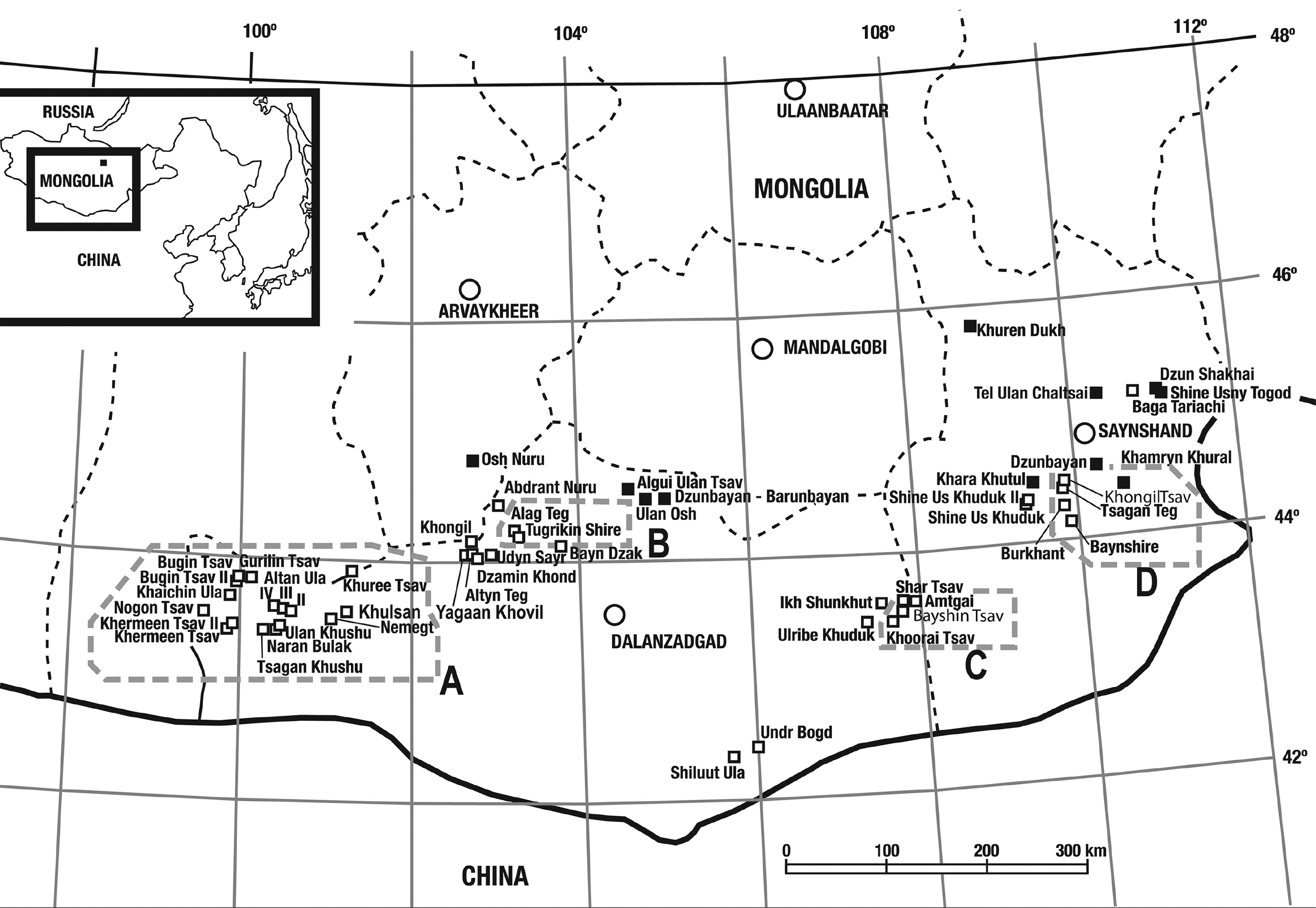
Cretaceous-aged dinosaur fossil localities of Mongolia; Tarbosaurus was collected in area A (left).

The vast majority of known Tarbosaurus fossils were recovered from the Nemegt Formation in the Gobi Desert of southern Mongolia. U-Pb dating from teeth of Tarbosaurus suggested that the deposition of the middle Nemegt Formation happened before 66.7 ± 2.5 Ma, during the Maastrichtian age of the Late Cretaceous, though whether the depositional age of the formation dates back to the late Campanian remains unresolved.

Tarbosaurus is found chiefly in the Nemegt Formation, whose sediments preserve large river channels and soil deposits that indicate a far more humid climate than those suggested by the underlying Barun Goyot and Djadochta Formations. However, caliche deposits indicate at least periodic droughts. Sediment was deposited in the channels and floodplains of large rivers. The rock facies of this formation suggest the presence of mudflats and shallow lakes. Sediments also indicate that there existed a rich habitat, offering diverse food in abundant amounts that could sustain massive Cretaceous dinosaurs.

The area would have been semi-arid during certain times of the year. The environment was likely dominated by Araucarian conifer forests, which also contained ginkgos, reed grasses, fagalean trees, cycad-like plants, sycamores (plane trees), bald cypresses, katsura relatives, pondweeds, tupelos, duckweeds, lotuses, and sedges.

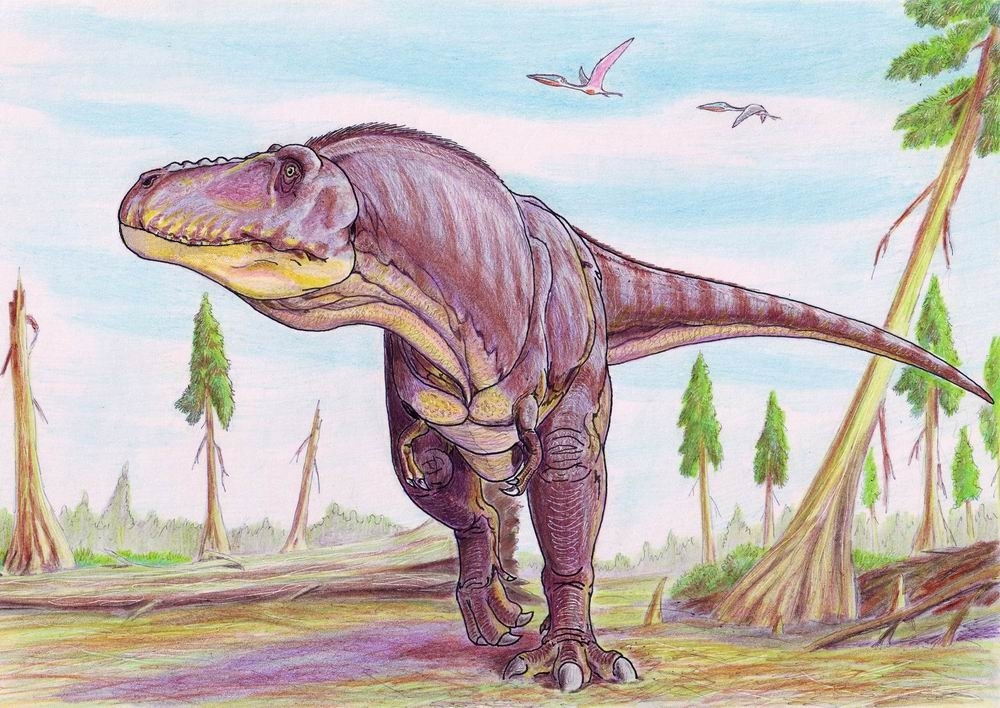
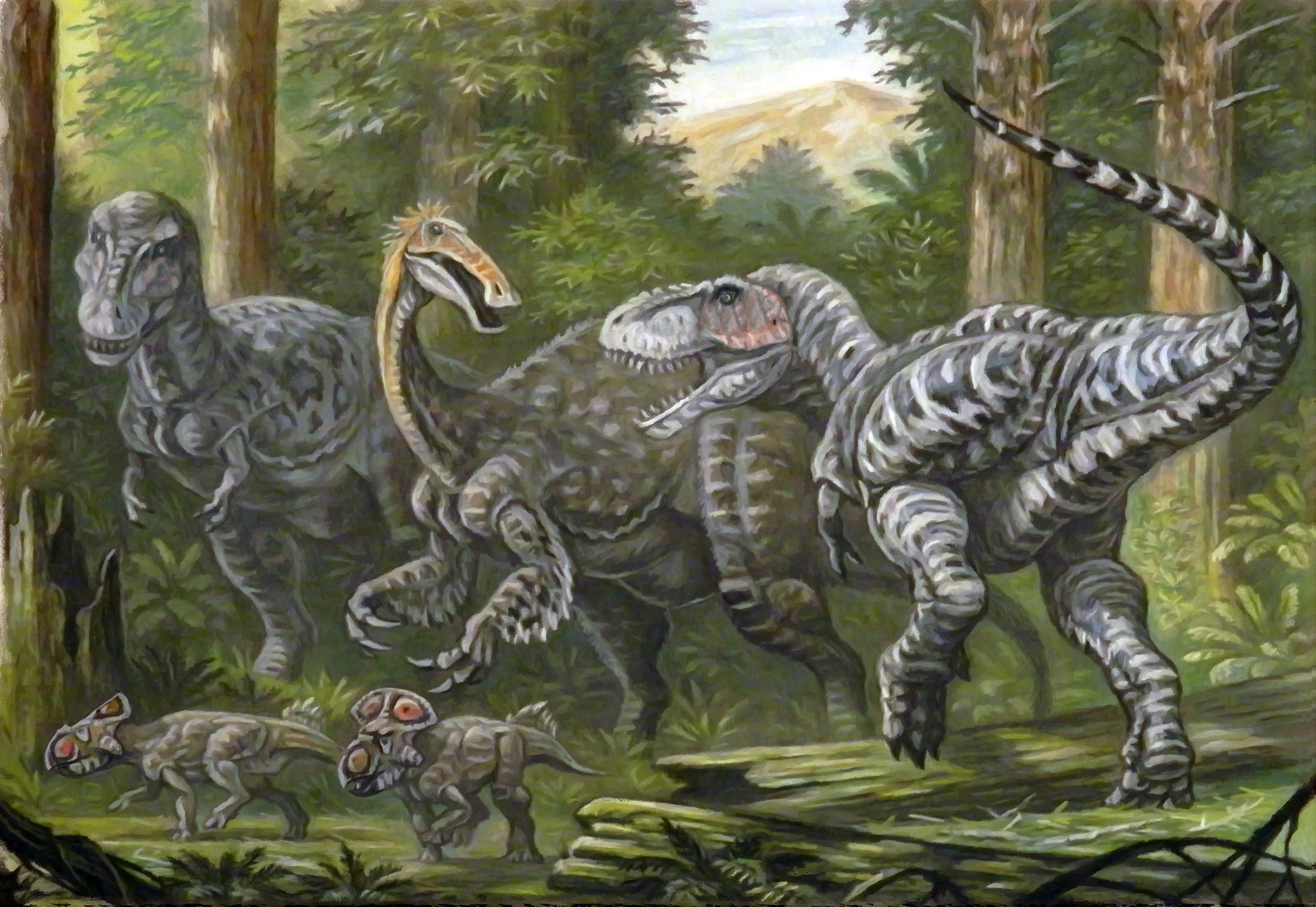
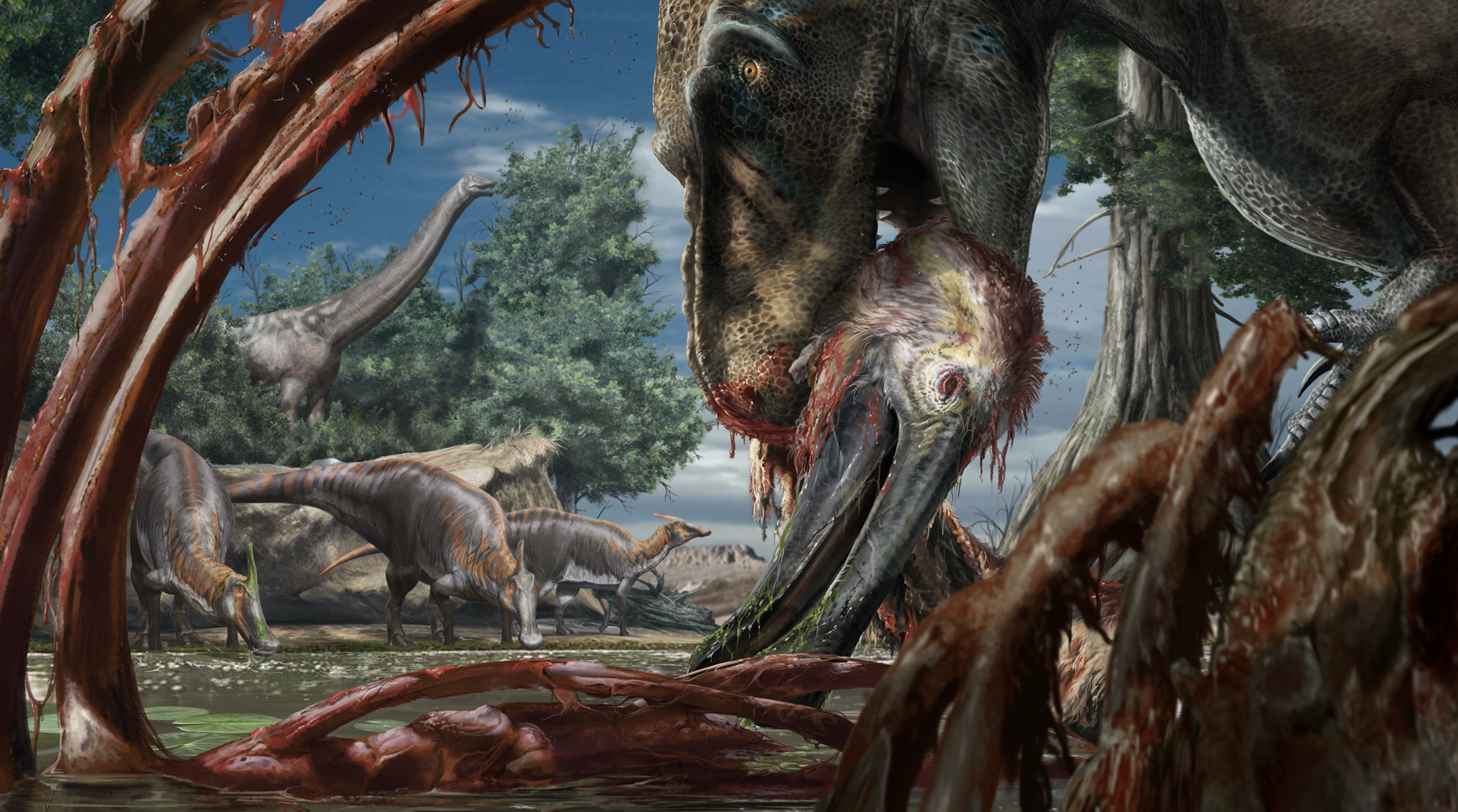
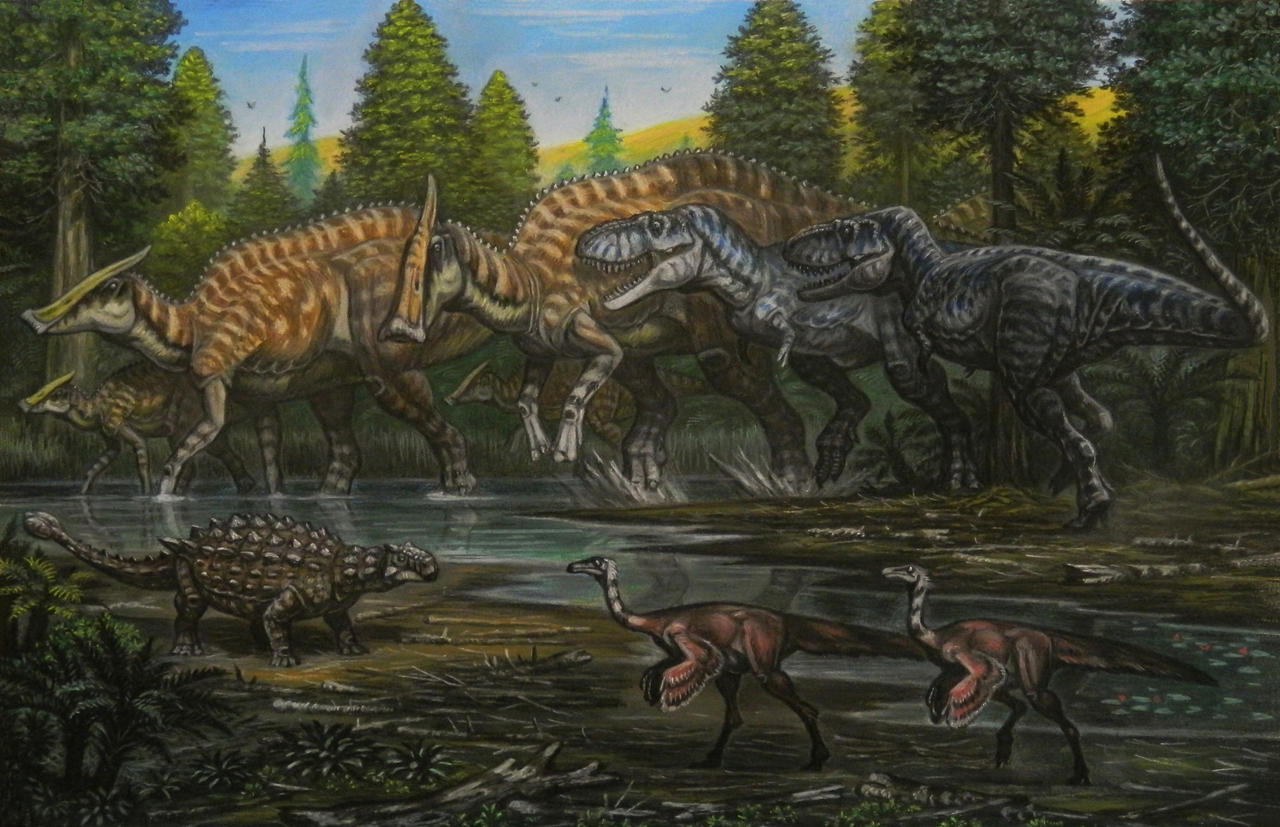
Restorations of Tarbosaurus in the paleoenvironments of the Nemegt Formation along with contemporary paleofauna

Occasional mollusk fossils are found, as well as a variety of other aquatic animals, such as fish and turtles. Crocodilians included several species of Paralligator, a genus with teeth adapted for crushing shells. Mammal fossils are exceedingly rare in the Nemegt Formation, but many birds have been found, including the enantiornithine Gurilynia and the hesperornithiform Judinornis, as well as Teviornis, an early representative of the still-existing Anseriformes. Scientists have described many dinosaurs from the Nemegt Formation, including the ankylosaurids Tarchia and Saichania and the pachycephalosaur Prenocephale.

By far the largest predator known from the formation, adult Tarbosaurus most likely preyed upon large hadrosaurs, such as Saurolophus and Barsboldia, or sauropods, such as Nemegtosaurus and Opisthocoelicaudia. Adults would have received little competition from small theropods, such as the small tyrannosaurid Alioramus, troodontids (Borogovia, Tochisaurus, Zanabazar), oviraptorosaurs (Elmisaurus, Nemegtomaia, Rinchenia) or Bagaraatan, sometimes considered a basal tyrannosauroid. Other theropods, like the gigantic Therizinosaurus, might have been herbivorous and ornithomimosaurs, such as Anserimimus, Gallimimus, and gigantic Deinocheirus might have been omnivores that only took small prey and were therefore no competition for Tarbosaurus. However, as in other large tyrannosaurids, as well as modern Komodo dragons, juveniles and subadult Tarbosaurus would have filled niches between the massive adults and these smaller theropods.

=== Subashi Formation ===
The Subashi Formation, in which Shanshanosaurus remains were discovered, dates to both the Campanian and Maastrichtian stages.

== See also ==
- Timeline of tyrannosaur research
