= Big John (dinosaur) =

Privately owned Triceratops fossil

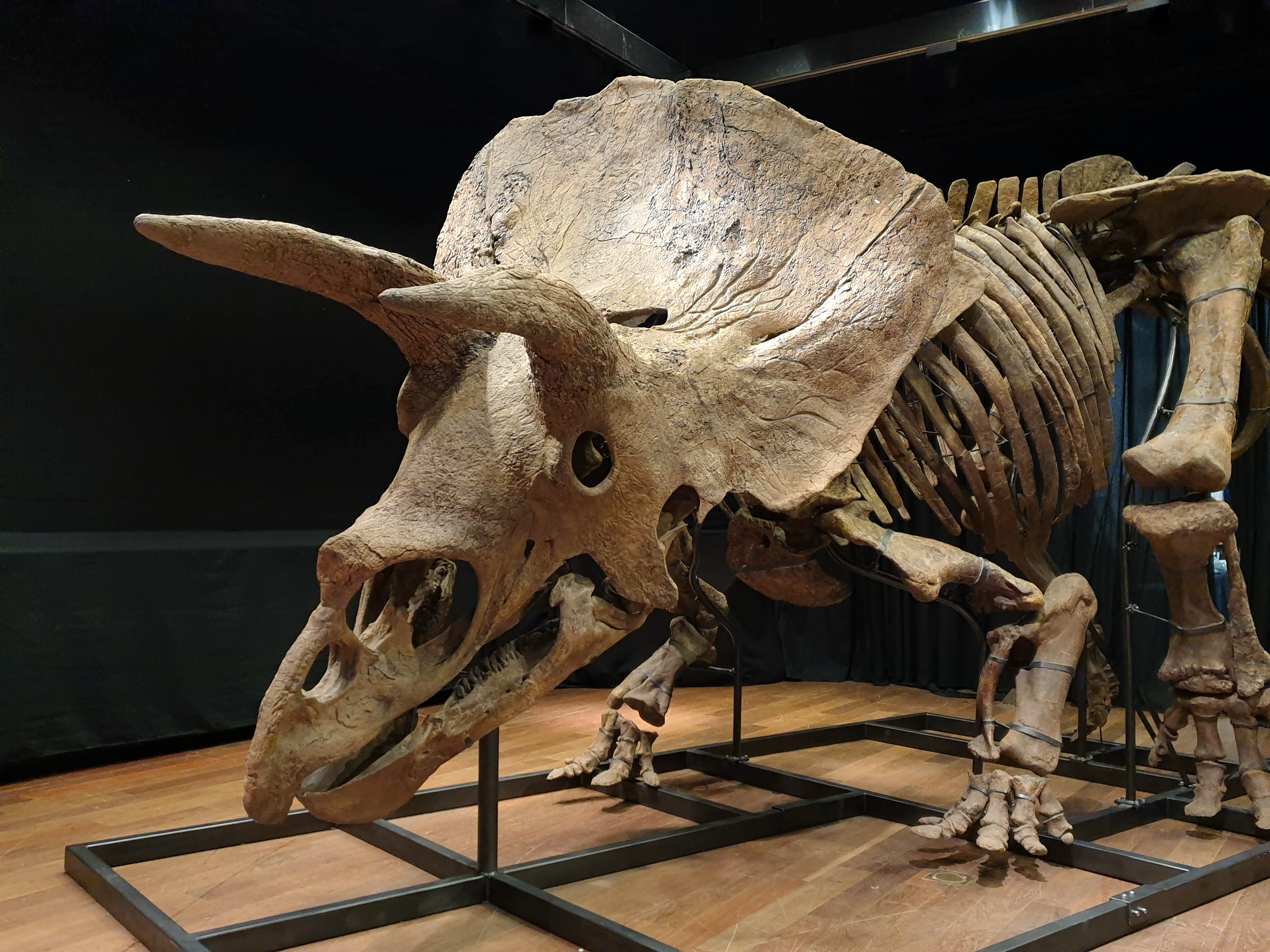
- Big John displayed at Hôtel Drouot, Paris, on October 21, 2021
- Common name: Big John
- Species: Triceratops horridus
- Age: 66.043 million years (aged 60)
- Place discovered: South Dakota, United States
- Date discovered: May 2014
- Discovered by: Walter W. Stein

Big John is a fossilized Triceratops horridus skeleton discovered in South Dakota's Hell Creek geological formation in 2014. Big John's 2021 auction price of €6.6 million (US$7.7 million) made it the most expensive Triceratops skeleton; its high price signaled increasing demand for dinosaur fossils among private collectors and prompted discussion about the drawbacks of private fossil ownership for scientific research.

== Discovery and description ==
The skeleton is roughly 66 million years old, and was discovered in May 2014 by paleontologist and professional fossil hunter Walter W. Stein. The fossil was located on a private ranch in Mud Butte, South Dakota, part of the Hell Creek geological formation. After only "10–15 minutes of searching" at the discovery site, Stein noticed a debris field of skeleton fragments leading into a hillside. The remains of a brow horn suggested that the fossil was a large Triceratops, one of the most common dinosaurs found in the Hell Creek Formation. The remains were scattered over an area of 100 square metres.

The fossil's excavation was completed by August 2015. The skeleton is over 60% complete, with a skull that is 75% complete. It was nicknamed "Big John", after the owner of the ranch where it was found.

The skeleton is 3 metres (9.8 ft) high and 8 metres (26 ft) long. The remains, which weigh over 700 kilograms (1,500 lb), include a 2.62-metre (8 ft 7 in) collarbone. The two top horns are over a metre long. According to Zoic, the team that assembled the fossil, Big John is about 5–10% larger than any other known Triceratops.

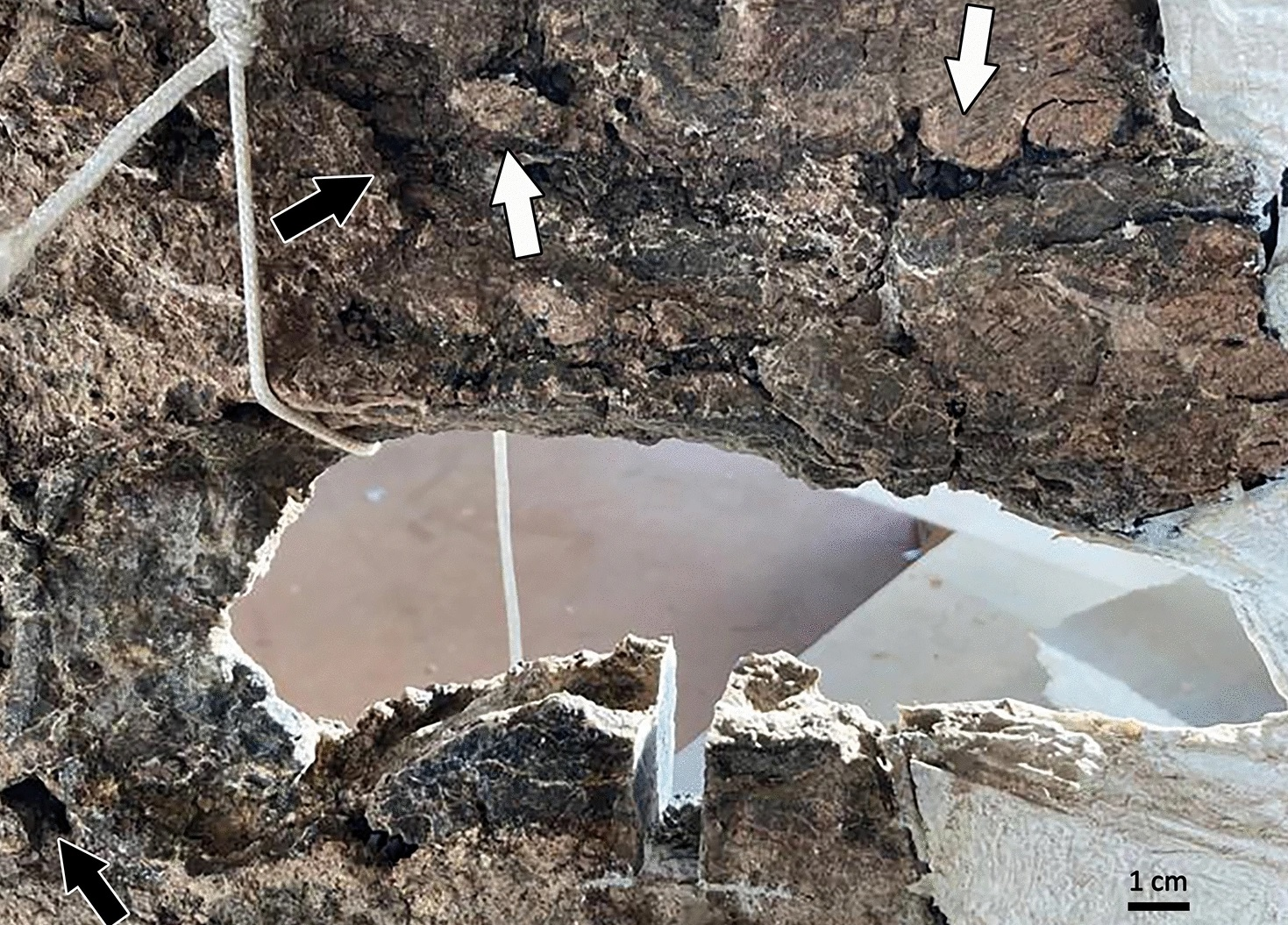
Close-up of the traumatic lesion on Big John's right squamosal bone

=== Traumatic lesion ===
Big John bears a keyhole-shaped traumatic lesion (approx. 20 cm × 5 cm) on its right squamosal bone, which is possibly the result of a fight with another Triceratops. The authors of a 2022 study concluded that the lesion was not simply an anatomical variation, based on the irregularity of its margins and the lack of similar structures in other Triceratops or Anchiceratops specimens. A close examination of the lesion under an electron microscope noted that the bone at its margins was porous and disorganized, resembling newly formed bone. This suggests that the injury had partially healed, and so was not the cause of death. The study authors estimated that Big John died at least six months after receiving the injury.

== Assembly ==
The remains of Big John were purchased for €150,000 and assembled over eight or nine months by the Zoic workshop in Trieste, Italy, who had previously restored two Triceratops skeletons. More than 200 bones were pieced together. The assembly process began in January 2021 and was live-streamed on the company's social media channels. Zoic modelled the dinosaur's posture after the Charging Bull bronze sculpture on Wall Street. They originally considered assembling the skeleton to stand on only two legs, but this was not possible given the weight of its skull. Flavio Bacchia, who supervised the assembly, estimated that the Triceratops was around 60 years old and weighed six tons at the time of its death. (Note: Bacchia opined that, "It's a masterpiece," and "There are quite a few triceratops skulls around in the world, but very few of them almost complete.")

== Auction and sale ==
=== Pre-auction display ===
The skull first went on public display in Trieste in February 2021. The fully-assembled skeleton was briefly displayed in Trieste, from 30 July to 1 August 2021. This three-day exhibition was celebrated with the release of a children's book, A dinosaur walking around Trieste, written by Barbara Battistelli and illustrated by Luca Vergerio and Gianpaolo di Silvestro. From mid-September to mid-October, the skeleton was displayed at the Rue des Archives in Paris, France.

=== Purchase ===
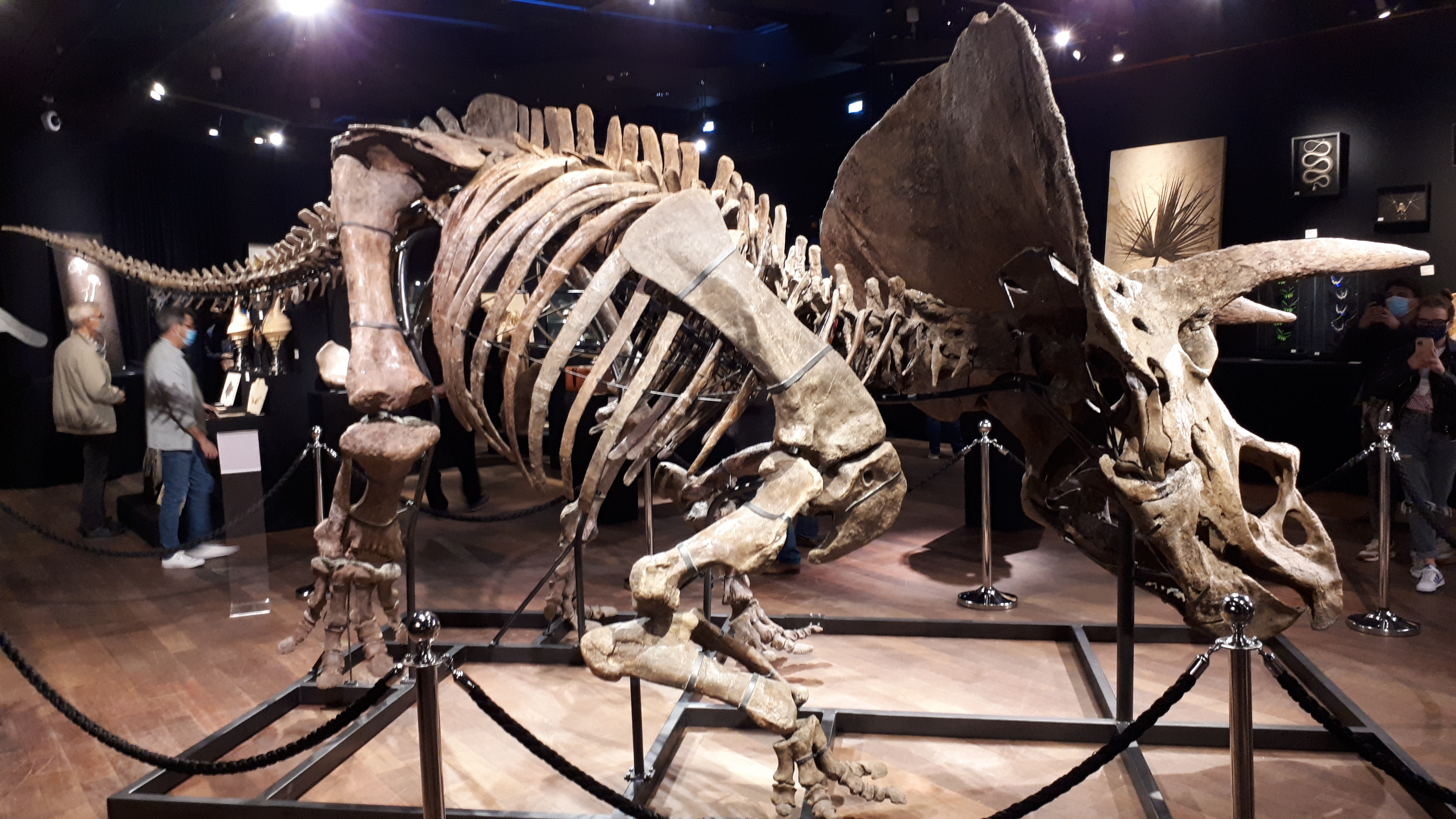
Big John on display at Hôtel Drouot in Paris, prior to its auction in October 2021

On 21 October 2021, the skeleton was sold for €6.6 million (US$7.7 million) by the Hôtel Drouot auction house in Paris, exceeding the expected sale price of US$1.4–1.7 million. It was purchased by a US collector, anonymous at the time, but later revealed to be Tampa-based businessman Siddhartha Pagidipati, who beat out 10 other bidders. (Note: Pagidipati was represented at the auction by businessman Djuan Rivers.) The high sale price signaled increasing demand for dinosaur fossils among private collectors. Walter Stein, who discovered the fossil, was surprised by its high auction price, and stated, "I would have felt better about it had it gone to a museum. Hopefully the new owner will put it on public display somewhere soon, so others can love the specimen like we did."

The auctioneer for the sale, Alexandre Giquello, said that skyrocketing prices for dinosaur fossils are "creating a new market." Some scientists, including Francis Duranthon, from the Toulouse Museum of Natural History, and Paul Barrett, from the Natural History Museum, London, expressed concern that this higher demand was pushing prices beyond what public museums can afford and would make specimens inaccessible to researchers. Denver Fowler, curator of the Badlands Dinosaur Museum at Dickinson Museum Center, questioned the fossil's scientific importance and argued that its private ownership made it impossible to verify any research based on the skeleton.

Big John is part of a larger run up in auction prices for dinosaur remains, and was, until the sale of Apex in 2024, the most expensive non-Tyrannosaurus fossil ever sold at auction. However, its price was substantially lower than the $27.5 million ($31.8 million with fees and costs) paid in 2020 for the Tyrannosaurus rex skeleton named Stan.

== Glazer Children's Museum ==
In January 2023, it was announced that Siddhartha Pagidipati and his family would be loaning Big John to the Glazer Children's Museum in Tampa, Florida, for a three-year public exhibition. Upon its arrival in Tampa, Big John was reconstructed in less than a week by technicians from Zoic workshop and displayed at the museum's annual gala on 3 February. The museum's Big John exhibition opened on 26 May, and the museum waived its usual rule prohibiting adults from attending the museum without accompanying children.

== Media coverage ==
Gedeon Programmes, Canal+, and WNET collaborated to produce a documentary about Big John entitled Jurassic Fortunes (2023). The documentary covered the fossil's discovery, reconstruction, and subsequent auction.

== See also ==
- List of dinosaur specimens with nicknames
- List of dinosaur specimens sold at auction
