= Aulani =

Beachside resort hotel in Kapolei, Oahu, Hawaii

Coordinates: 21°20′20″N 158°07′22″W

Aulani, a Disney Resort & Spa

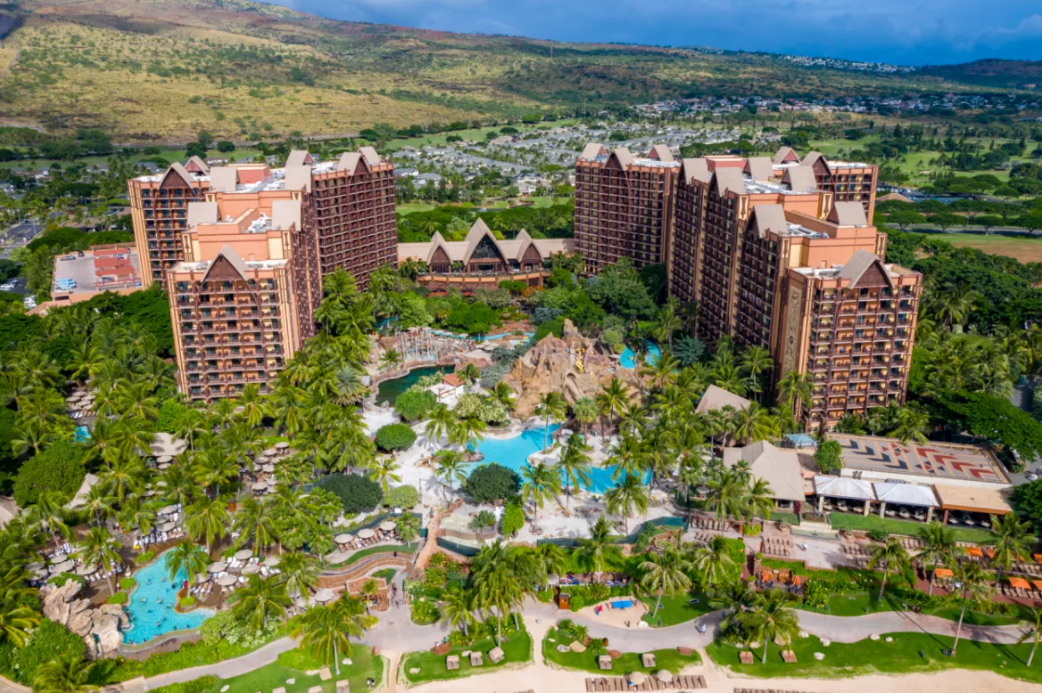
- Aulani Resort in January 2020
- Interactive map of the Aulani, a Disney Resort & Spa area

General information
- Type: Resort
- Location: Ko Olina, Hawaii
- Opened: August 29, 2011
- Operator: Disney Experiences

Other information
- Number of rooms: 351 hotel rooms 481 Disney Vacation Club Villas, including 21 Grand Villas

Website
- Official website

Aulani, a Disney Resort & Spa, is a beachside resort hotel at the Ko Olina Resort in Kapolei, Hawaii, on the island of Oahu. It is one of Disney's "stand-alone" hotels, situated in a location without any adjacent theme parks, alongside Disney's Hilton Head Island Resort and Disney's Vero Beach Resort.

The resort opened to the public on August 29, 2011, and features 351 hotel rooms and 481 Disney Vacation Club villas spread across 21 acres. As of July 2025, the resort has several dining establishments, including Makahiki, The Olelo Room, Ulu Cafe, and 'AMA'AMA. Additionally, there are smaller outlets for snacks, including the poolside lounge 'Off the Hook'.

== History ==
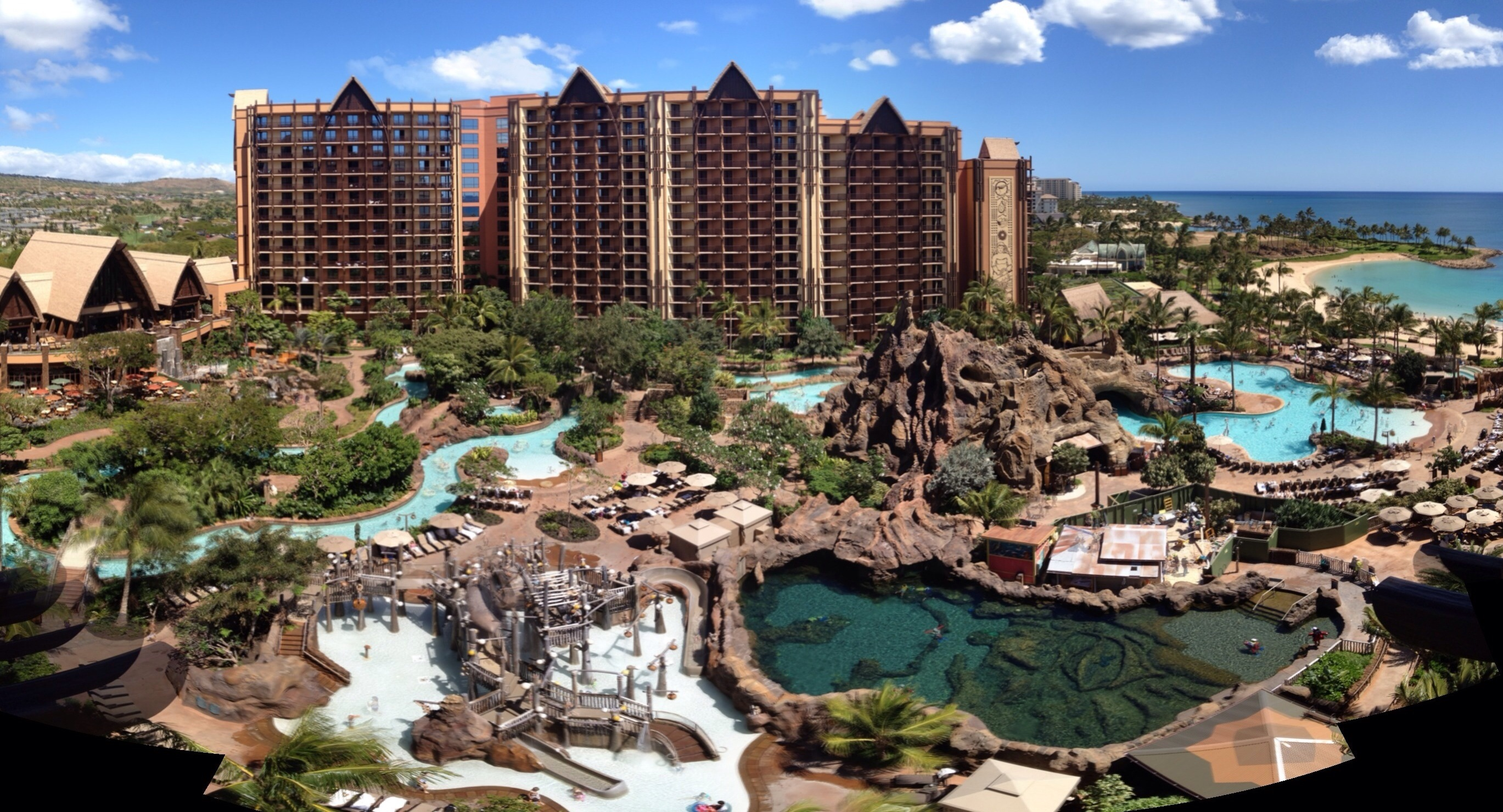
A view of the hotel, 2012

In 1991, Disney registered Disney Vacation Club, its timeshare plan, with the state of Hawaii but did not establish an escrow agreement, allowing the company to advertise—but not sell—timeshare interests in the state. The resort project was announced on October 3, 2007, releasing its name on January 19, 2010. The word ‘Aulani’ in Hawaiian can be loosely translated as "orange" or "with deep messages." When the word is used as a name, it can mean "message from the chief."

With an estimated cost of $800 million, the project aimed to generate about 1,000 jobs at the resort. Disney Vice President Djuan Rivers managed the project, and it was designed by Joe Rohde of Walt Disney Imagineering.

Timeshare sales commenced on July 15, 2010, with room reservations becoming available in August 2010. Nevertheless, on August 12, 2011, Disney suspended Aulani's timeshare sales and terminated three executives, among them Disney Vacation Club president Jim Lewis. This decision was made in response to senior management's recognition that the annual dues had been set too low to adequately cover maintenance costs.

Timeshare sales were later resumed; however, specific sales figures have remained unclear since 2010 due to gaps in published information.

In March 2019, the resort was named "Best Hotels/Accommodations – Luxury Accommodations" in the 2019 aio Media Hawaii Lodging & Tourism Awards.

== Theme ==
Walt Disney Imagineering collaborated with Wimberly Allison Tong & Goo, Architects Hawaii Ltd, and cultural experts to design and construct a theme that celebrates the customs and tradition of Hawaii. The company also created an advisory council of Hawaiian elders to ensure authenticity to Hawaiian culture.

A review in 2018 mentioned that "the modus operandi at Aulani is 'Big H, Little D,' as in: big emphasis on Hawaiian traditions and history, with just a little bit of Disney fairy dust sprinkled over the experience." Other reviews specified the Disney influence as including poolside visits by characters, Mickey-shaped foods, and character breakfasts and dinners. Characters that one could meet at the resort included (as of October 2023) Mickey Mouse, Minnie Mouse, Donald Duck, Daisy Duck, Goofy, Max Goof, Pluto, Chip 'n' Dale, Stitch from Lilo & Stitch, Duffy the Disney Bear, Shellie May, 'Olu Mel and Moana from the eponymous 2016 film. As of February 2021, Angel (Experiment 624) from the Lilo & Stitch franchise began making appearances at the resort. All character and guest interactions were socially distanced during the time of the COVID-19 pandemic in Hawaii. When hiring staff members, candidates with Hawaiian language skills are preferred for all jobs as part of the resort's plan to expose guests to the language of the land.

In July 2019, Forbes published a review by Laura Manske that emphasized the company's extensive use of Hawaiian culture, including art and architecture and the program that exposes youngsters to the "culture, art, and music of Hawaii through interactive play." In her review, Manske commented, "There is a dramatic and sublime sense of place at Aulani, where everything -- from the architecture to the art, activities to cuisine -- connects to a deeper meaning and embraces the people, places, past, present, art, music, dance, and foods of Hawaii. Aulani is not a theme park; it is a hideaway with just enough Disney-orchestrated animation and activity to add rhythm and variety to your vacation days."

== Pu‘u Kilo and Water Slides ==
Pu‘u Kilo is designed as a volcano and consists of two slides: Volcanic Vertical (a body water slide that leads into the Waikolohe Pool) and Tubestone Curl (a tube water slide that ends up in the Waikolohe Stream).
