= Fossil trade =

Trade involving fossils

The fossil trade is the purchase and sale of fossils. This is at times done illegally with stolen fossils, and important scientific specimens are lost each year. The trade is lucrative, and many celebrities collect fossils.

The fossil trade has attracted criticism from many paleontologists, who regard the private ownership of fossils to be damaging to science.

== History ==
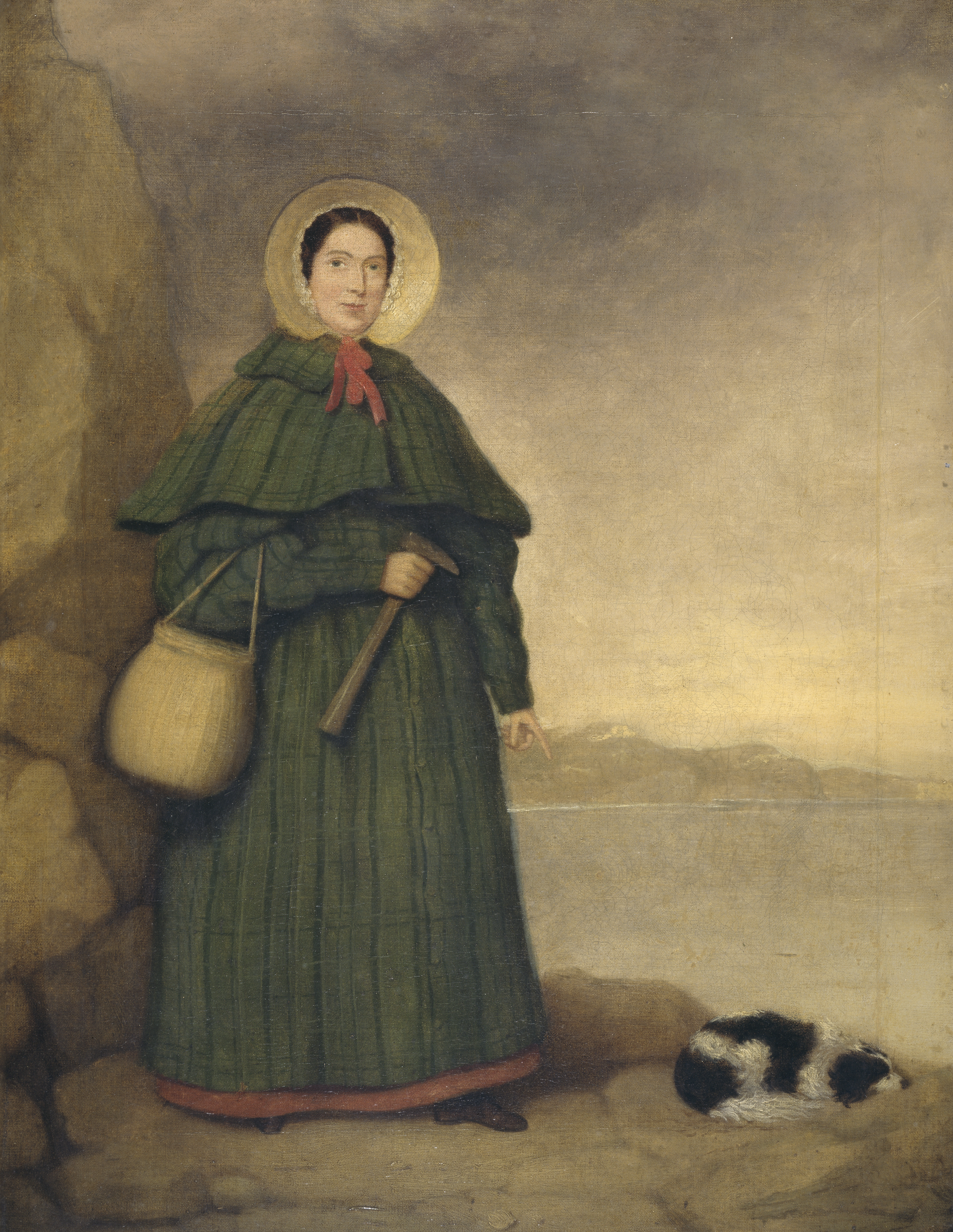
Mary Anning, a famous collector and seller of fossils

Ever since the early 19th century, there has been a considerable commercial interest in fossils. The increasing growth of the fossil market in recent decades is often traced back to the auction of the Tyrannosaurus skeleton known as Sue in 1997 for $8.3 million. According to the head of science and natural history at Christie's, James Hyslop, the market in fossils has been growing consistently since 2007. Due to the increased awareness of the lucrative nature of fossils, many landowners have become more reluctant to work with scientists, preferring to instead offer prospecting rights to the highest bidder.

The international trade in fossils for use in alternative medicine, commonly referred to as "dragon bone", was worth US$700 million annually as of 2010.

Fossil poaching is common in Mongolia. In five years, the United States Immigration and Customs Enforcement seized $44 million worth of smuggled fossils. Fossils from Mongolia and China, which are illegal to export, are often claimed to be from Central Asia.

Fossils sold through the fossil trade are often composites of multiple specimens, not necessarily from a single species, combined to look like one skeleton.

== Legality ==
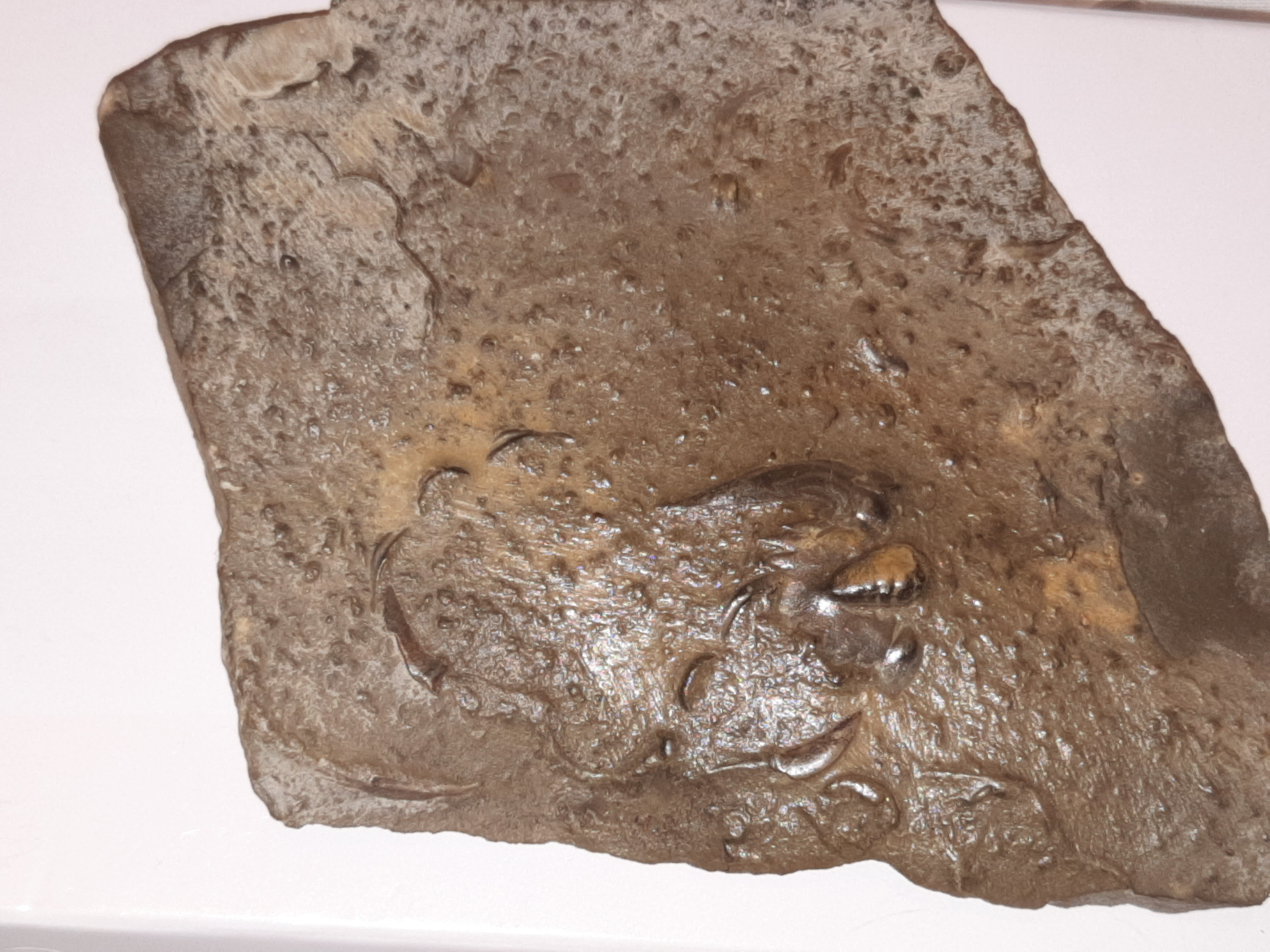
This trilobite moulting bed discovered in China is an example of a fossil legally purchased through the fossil trade

Whether the trade in fossils is legal depends on the legislation in a given jurisdiction, and the legal classification of fossils is highly fragmented: depending on local laws, fossil might be considered as minerals, antiquities, cultural artifacts, fossils in their own right, or not fall into any of these categories at all.

In the United States, it is legal to sell fossils collected on private land. In Mongolia and China the export of fossils is illegal. Brazil considers all fossils as federal assets and prohibits their trade since 1942, banned the permanent exports of holotypes and other fossils of national interest in 1990, and requires permits by the Ministry of Science, Technology and Innovation for permanent exports.

== Ethics and controversy ==
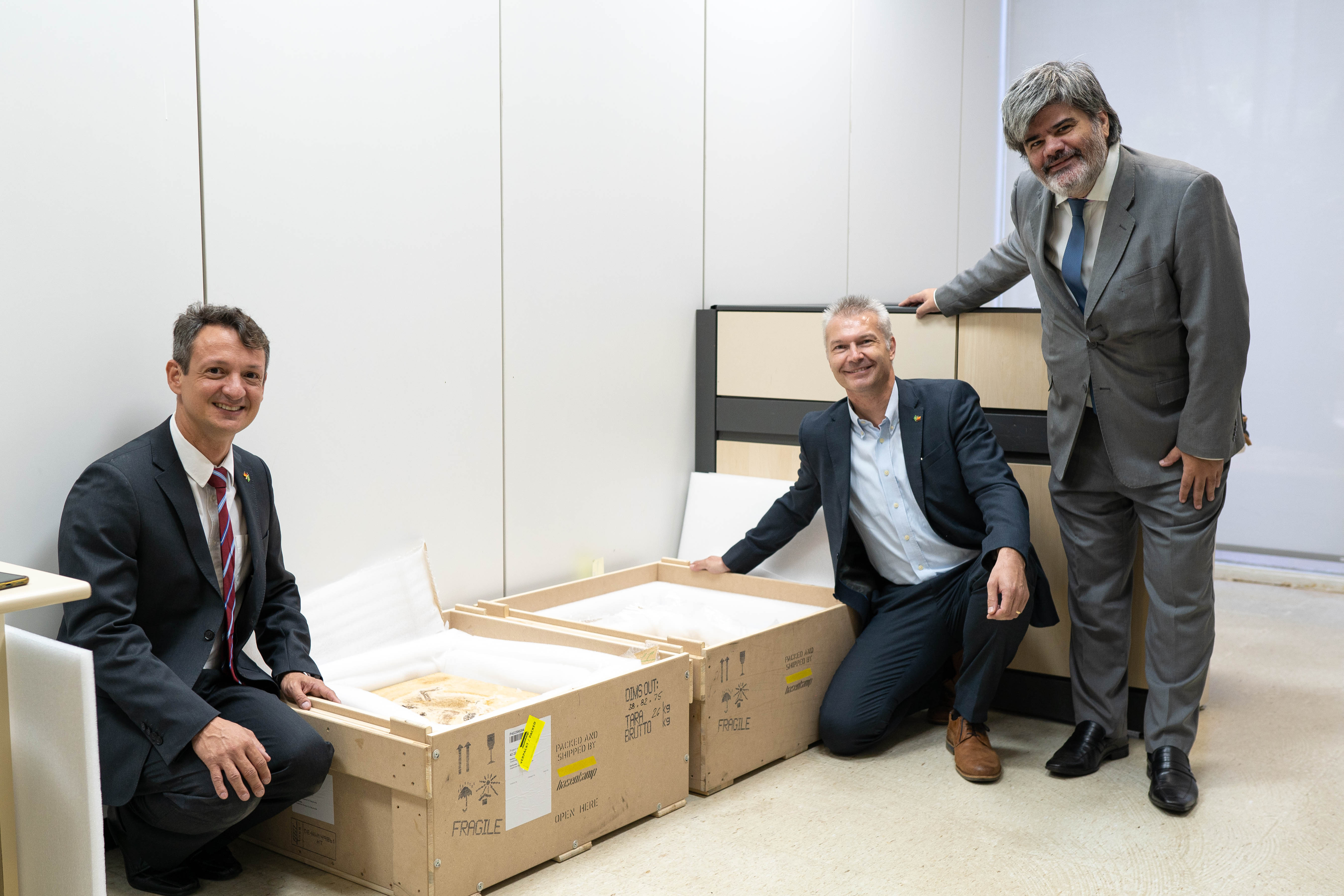
Officials with the Ubirajara jubatus specimen after its return to Brazil in 2023

The Society of Vertebrate Paleontology, an international association of professional and amateur vertebrate paleontologists, believes that scientifically important fossils—especially but not exclusively those found on public lands—should be held in perpetuity in the public trust, preferably in a museum or research institution, where they can benefit the scientific community as a whole as well as future generations. In the United States, Paleontological Resources Preservation Act. S. 546 and H. R. 2416 were introduced in the US Congress with SVP's full support.

Many commercial fossil collectors and dealers believe that such policies are a breach of their rights. The argument has also been put forth that there are too few professional paleontologists to collect and preserve fossils currently exposed to the elements, and that it is therefore essential that private citizens be allowed to collect them for the sake of their preservation. Eric Scott, the Curator of Paleontology for the San Bernardino County Museum, argues that 1) private citizens and amateur (not for profit) collectors can and do participate frequently in the permitted recovery and preservation of significant vertebrate fossils, and 2) preservation of significant fossils does not require or mandate sale of those fossils. The Society of Vertebrate Paleontology's by-laws state that the society does not condone the trade of scientifically significant vertebrate fossils, except for the purpose of keeping fossils in the public trust.

The illegal export of fossils has increasingly attracted criticism, considered by some a form of science colonialism. As a result, several fossils have been repatriated, and many more are being reclaimed by their countries of origin. Notably, the fossil "Ubirajara jubatus", illegally exported from Brazil and deposited in a German museum, was described by a team of German scientists. Their paper has been retracted, and the fossil has been returned to Brazil.

In addition, some of these trafficked fossils are artificially altered to increase their commercial value, or may carry less information of their exact origin than fossils extracted following the law.

- The spinosaurid Irritator challengeri was infamously named to reflect "irritation, the feeling the authors felt (understated here) when discovering that the snout had been artificially elongated."
- A 2023 description of a turtle fossil deposited in Switzerland revealed the bones present to be a chimeric fabrications consisting of remains from two different genera, Santanachelys and Araripemys, plus unidentifiable fragments.
- A reassessment of the type material of the mosasaurid Xenodens calminechari in 2024 suggested that teeth had been artificially placed into the maxilla of the fossil material which had been obtained from an unsupervised commercial excavation.

Forgeries like these might make fossils easier to sell to tourists and even to scientists not trained to identify the fakes.

== Notable incidents ==
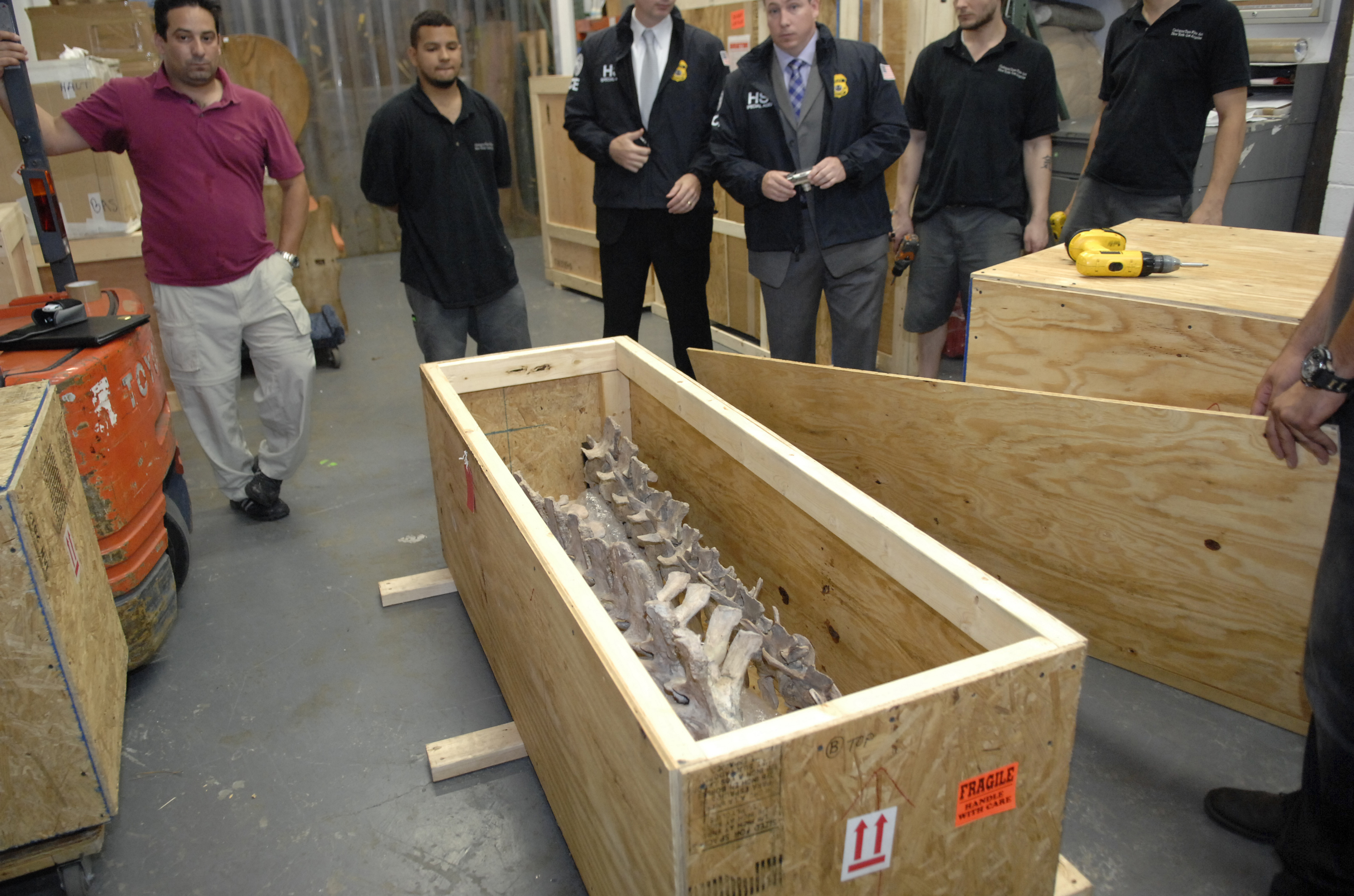
US customs officials with a confiscated Tarbosaurus skeleton in May 2013

A hoax specimen composed of parts of genuine Yanornis and Microraptor fossils obtained by a museum through the fossil trade was originally interpreted in 1999 as a "missing link" between dinosaurs and birds and planned to be named "Archaeoraptor", but was identified as a hoax before being formally published in a scientific journal.

A Tyrannosaurus skeleton nicknamed "Stan" sold at an auction in 2020 for $31.8 million, a record-setting price.

The skull of a Tyrannosaurus relative called Tarbosaurus bataar illegally exported from Mongolia was purchased by the actor Nicolas Cage for $276,000 in 2007. When contacted by U.S. authorities, Cage voluntarily handed over the specimen for repatriation to Mongolia.

A smuggled skeleton of Tarbosaurus bataar, which is also called Tyrannosaurus bataar, was the subject of the in rem case United States v. One Tyrannosaurus Bataar Skeleton. The fossil was being auctioned in the United States, and was returned to Mongolia in 2013.

The holotype specimen of the dinosaur Halszkaraptor had been obtained through the fossil trade by 2011. Due to its provenance, several scientists initially expressed concern that it was a hoax, but scanning suggests the specimen was not tampered with.

On 18 July 2024 Stegosaurus Apex was auctioned for $44,600,000. It sold eleven times above pre-sale estimates to American billionaire financier Kenneth Griffin and became the most expensive fossil ever sold.

== See also ==
- Antiquities trade
- List of dinosaur specimens sold at auction
