= Djuan Rivers =

American businessman (born 1965)

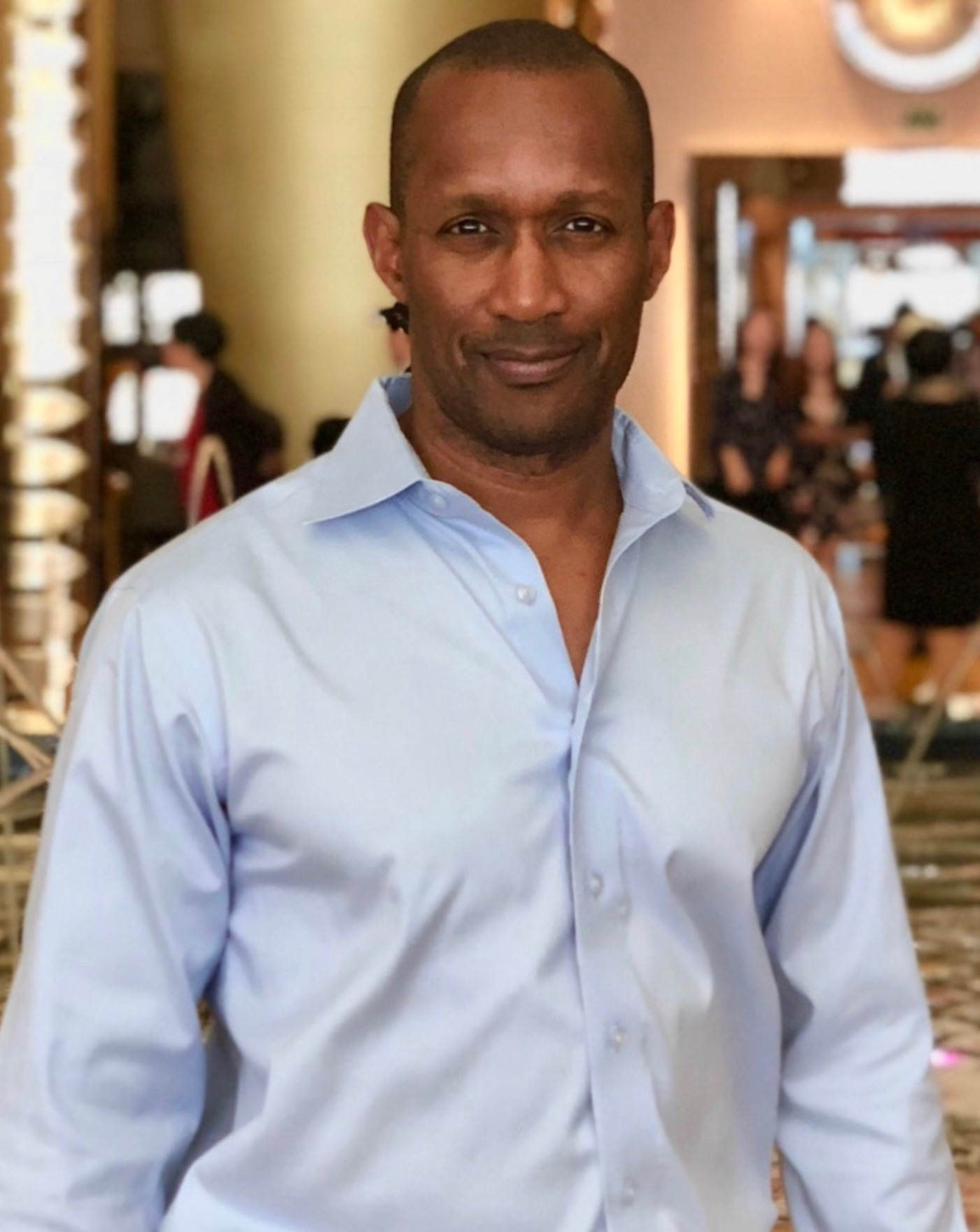
- Born: 1965 (age 60–61); Orlando, Florida
- Education: BA in Economics
- Alma mater: Emory University
- Occupations: (Fmr) Vice President, Disney's Animal Kingdom

Djuan Rivers was the Vice President of Disney's Animal Kingdom at Walt Disney World from 2014 until May 2021. He previously served as Vice President for Hotels and Business Solutions at Disneyland Paris after having been General Manager of the Disney Aulani Resort & Spa in Hawaii. He was one of the most senior African Americans in the Walt Disney Company during his tenure.

== Background ==
Djuan Rivers (born 1965) is an Orlando native and attended Emory University where he earned his Bachelor of Arts in Economics in 1987.

== Career with the Walt Disney Company ==
Rivers is a 30-year veteran of the Walt Disney Company and one of the Executive Champions of the Disney VoluntEARS program. Having started at an entry level managerial position, he worked his way up to become the General Manager of Disney's Wilderness Lodge. He subsequently was the Hotel Director for the Disney Magic and Disney Wonder cruise ships. Rivers went on to hold a number of executive positions within Disney, and he helped lead the opening of six resorts in Florida and three resorts at Disneyland Paris. In 2005, he was named Vice President of Downtown Disney in Florida. In 2007, he was named the Vice President for New Business Development for Disney’s Parks and Resorts division.

In 2008, he was made the Vice President of Disney’s Aulani Resort and Spa, making him one of the most senior African-Americans in the Walt Disney Company. In addition to overseeing the $800,000,000 construction project, Rivers was also charged with building ties with local communities and government officials along with learning about the native Hawaiian culture, in order to authentically integrate it into the resort. Rivers also committed to incorporating environmentally friendly initiatives into the resort's design and construction. In 2012, Rivers was appointed Vice President for Hotels and Business Solutions at Disneyland Paris.

In 2014, Rivers was appointed to the position of Vice President of Disney's Animal Kingdom. Rivers first launched Animal Kingdom's newer "after dark" attractions, including the "Rivers of Light" show and evening lighting on the Kilimanjaro Safaris and the Tree of Life. He then worked to complete and launched the popular Pandora–The World of Avatar area of the theme park in 2017, which opened to excellent reviews and won awards for the visual effects.

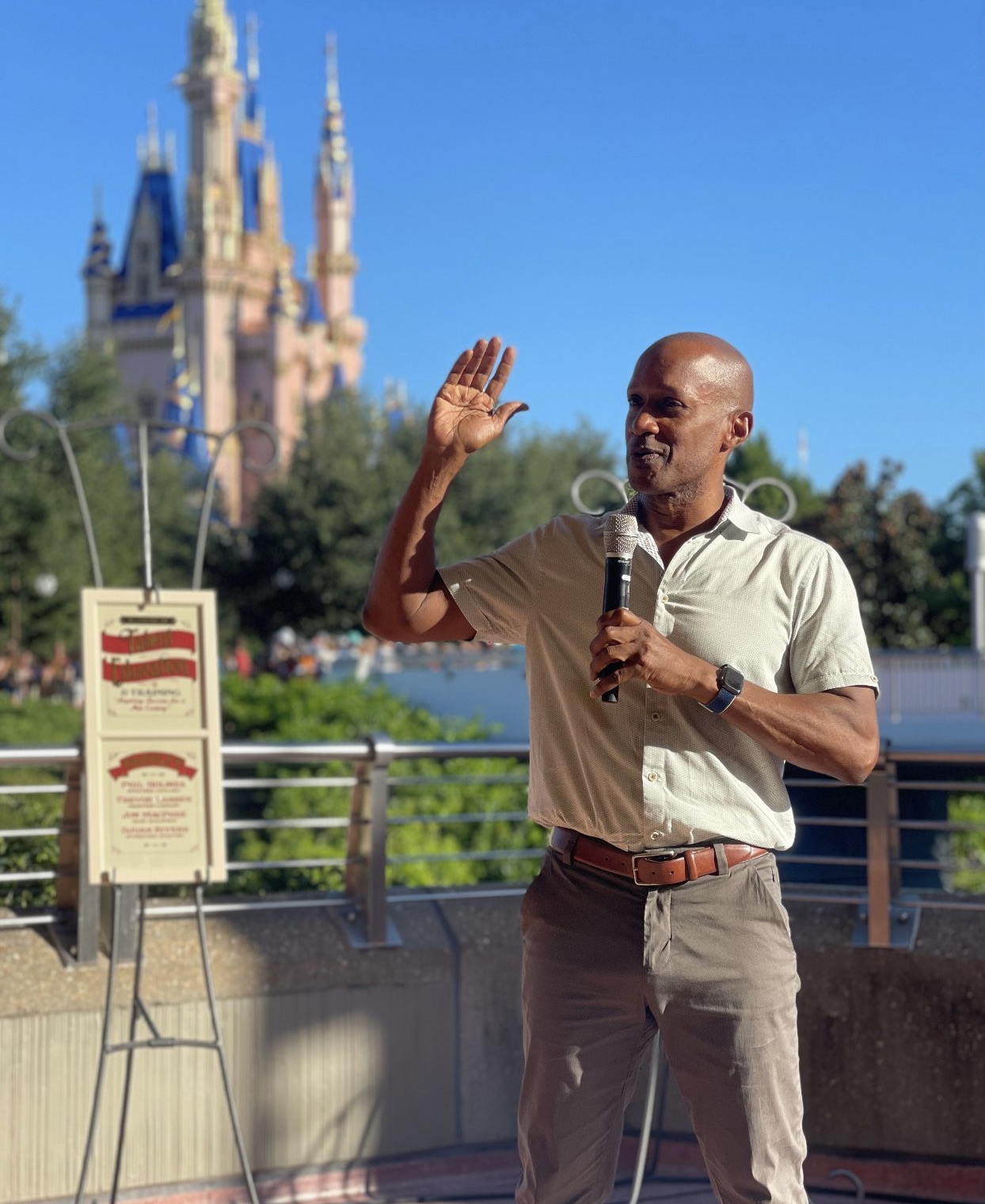
Djuan Rivers speaking before his name is engraved on Main Street USA.

In August 2021, Djuan Rivers was honored by having his name engraved onto a storefront window on Main Street, U.S.A. in the Magic Kingdom; he is the first African-American to receive such an honor.

== Personal ==
Rivers serves on the Board of Directors of the Child & Family Service charity of Hawaii and the Boys & Girls Club of Hawaii.

He is known for being an avid sportsman, as he is attempting to climb the Seven Summits, the highest mountains on each continent. In October 2008, Rivers was one of the first people to participate in a HALO skydive over Mount Everest, incidentally making him the first African-American to do so.

In August 2019, Rivers explained to the Orlando Sentinel how his travels to Nepal and his climbing of the real Mount Everest helped inspire his love of the Disney attraction Expedition Everest, which incorporates dozens of artifacts and designs from the real life adventure.

In January 2021, Rivers announced that he would be retiring from the Disney Company in May of that year. He said that he would be moving to Paris and that he hopes to spend his retirement traveling the world.

In October 2021, Djuan Rivers acted as a representative for an anonymous international collector in the acquisition of the Big John (dinosaur), the fossilized skeleton of the largest known Triceratops dinosaur, at a Paris auction for approximately €6.65 million. Rivers was quoted saying the buyer was “absolutely thrilled” to bring the Big John specimen into private ownership after its sale. He added, "The history behind this and the duration of it is absolutely impressive. So to be able to be a part of preserving something of this nature... [is] something extremely special."
