= Duffy the Disney Bear =

Stuffed bear

- The Walt Disney Company character
- Duffy Plush (in sailor costume)
- First appearance: 2005

In-universe information
- Aliases: The Bear of Luck and Happiness
- Nickname: Duffy
- Species: Bear plush
- Gender: Male
- Affiliation: Disney Parks

Duffy the Disney Bear (ダッフィー) is a Disney Parks character developed for merchandise, live entertainment and meet-and-greets. The character is especially popular in Disney's Asian theme parks—Tokyo DisneySea, Hong Kong Disneyland and Shanghai Disneyland. The character has struggled to meet the same levels of popularity at the American theme parks Disneyland and Walt Disney World, although Duffy and ShellieMay appeared in Disneyland's 70th anniversary cavalcade.

Duffy's design has two connections to Mickey Mouse: the light area on his face is shaped like a "Hidden Mickey", and there is a Mickey birthmark on his lower back. Duffy is unique among Disney characters in that he did not appear in a Disney movie or TV show before being featured in the parks.

Related characters were later introduced in the parks, expanding into a merchandise and entertainment line called "Duffy and Friends", which includes Duffy and his friends ShellieMay, Gelatoni, StellaLou, CookieAnn, 'Olu Mel, and LinaBell. The franchise is Disney's best-selling line in Asia, with sales topping $500 million in September 2023.

== History ==
The "Disney Bear" was originally created in 2002 as a unique product for the opening of Once Upon a Toy, a merchandise store in Walt Disney World's Disney Springs shopping area. It was not overly popular at the time.

When the Oriental Land Company (OLC) wanted to bring The Disney Bear to Tokyo DisneySea in 2005, Walt Disney Imagineering suggested the bear be given a new story in consideration of the Japanese audience's love for background stories. According to the new story, Minnie Mouse gave "sailor Mickey" a teddy bear to keep him company on his voyages; Mickey named the plush toy "Duffy" because Minnie gave it to him in a duffle bag. Duffy the Disney Bear merchandise was released at Tokyo DisneySea on December 25, 2005. The Oriental Land Company aggressively marketed Duffy in the Tokyo DisneySea park, and he was quickly added as a walk-around character in 2005.

As Duffy's popularity grew, OLC started to retheme the Old Cape Cod area at Tokyo DisneySea to add Duffy, which included changing the show "Donald's Boat Builders" at the Cape Cod Cook-Off Theatre to "My Friend Duffy", which tells the story of how Duffy comes to life. (There have been several shows performed on this stage telling the story of how ShellieMay came to be; introducing Gelatoni; featuring all seven Friends as they celebrate Friendship Day.) Due to Duffy's popularity amongst Japanese fans, limits were set on the number of Duffy items a guest could buy. People lined up at stores for any new costume release.

Duffy was introduced at the American Disney parks on October 14, 2010. He then joined Hong Kong Disneyland Resort on November 19, 2010. In 2012, he appeared in Disneyland Paris.

Capitalizing on Duffy's success at Tokyo DisneySea, the park began introducing new characters. On January 22, 2010, a female plush bear named ShellieMay debuted in the park as Duffy's friend. On June 30, 2014, they introduced Gelatoni the plush cat to select fans. (He was officially introduced to the general public at Tokyo DisneySea on July 4.) StellaLou the plush rabbit was introduced to select fans on March 23, 2017. (She was officially introduced to the general public on March 30.)

The next three friends debuted at other Disney parks and resorts. On July 3, 2018, Hong Kong Disneyland debuted CookieAnn the plush dog. 'Olu Mel the plush turtle was introduced at the Aulani Disney Resort on July 27, 2018. On September 29, 2021, LinaBell the plush fox was introduced at Shanghai Disneyland, as part of the park's 5th anniversary celebrations. “My Friend Duffy” became “Duffy and Friends’ Wonderful Friendship” on July 4, 2023.

== Duffy's friends ==
All characters in Duffy and Friends are plush toys but come to life in Mickey's imagination.

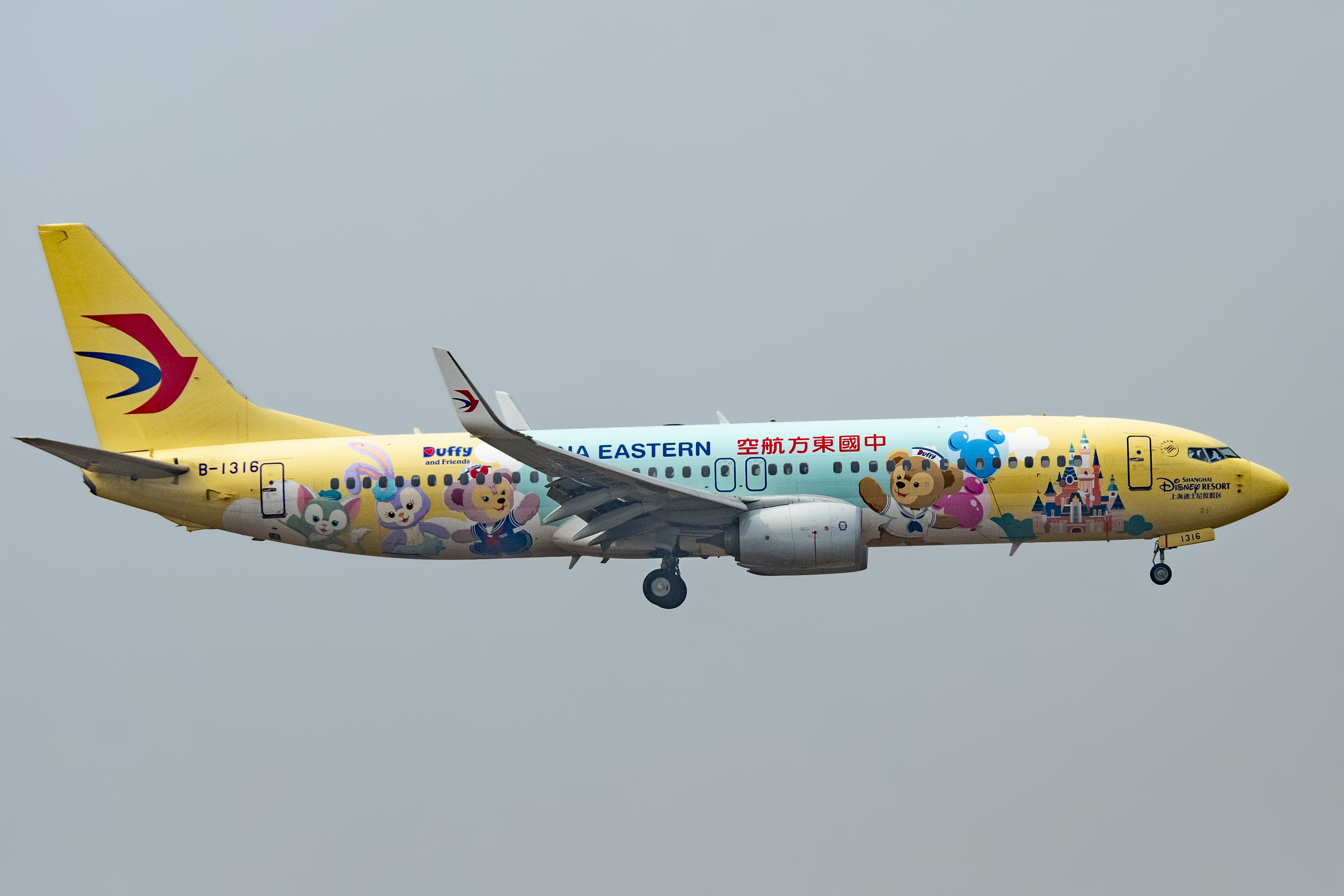
From left to right: Gelatoni, StellaLou and ShellieMay

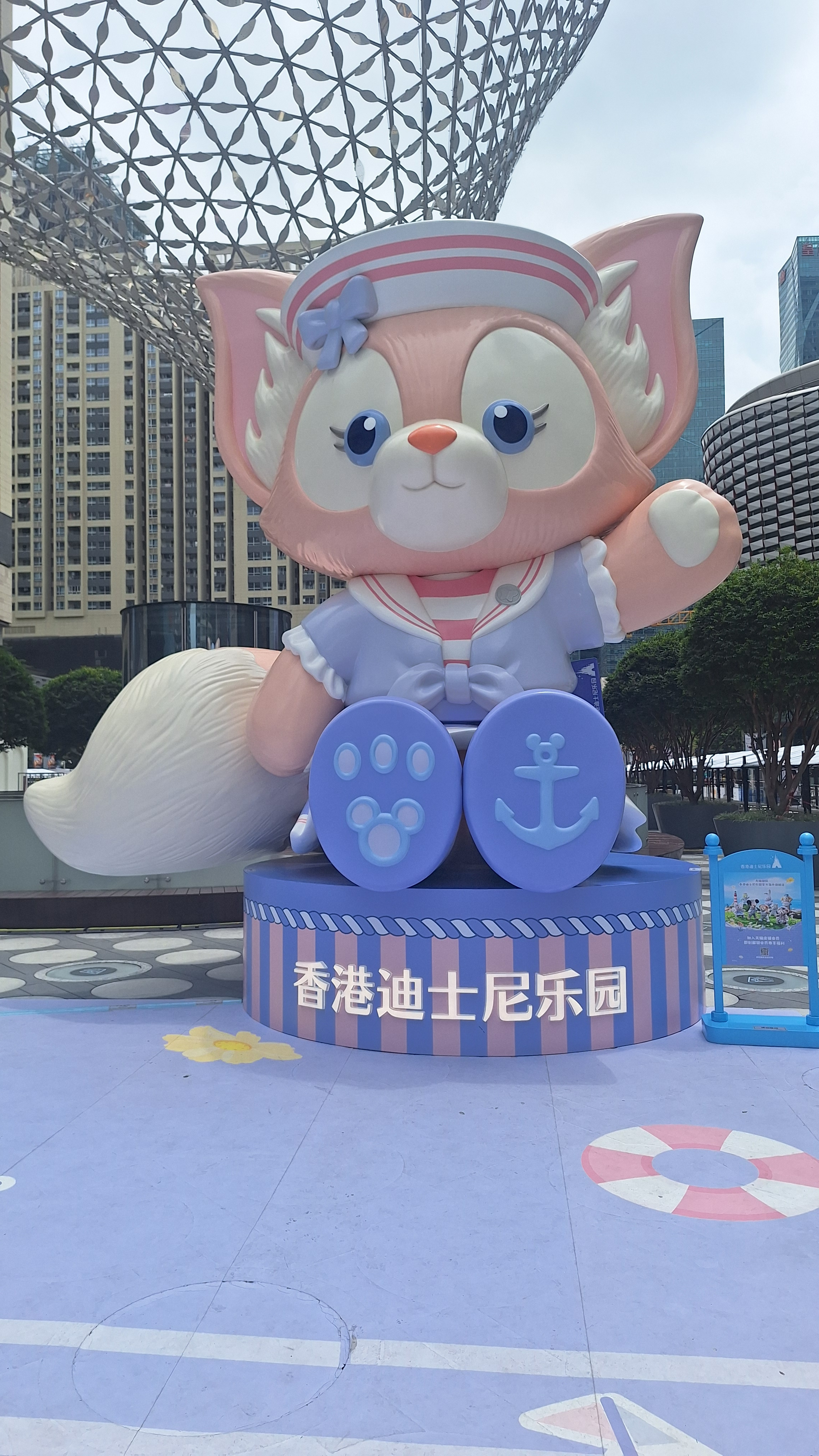
Giant Linabell at Shenzhen one avenue

- ShellieMay (January 22, 2010 debut at Tokyo DisneySea) is a dexterous teddy bear with a green bow and a seashell pendant who is talented in crafting gifts. Although Duffy and ShellieMay may be mistakenly seen as sweethearts, they are just good friends. ShellieMay lives on Cape Cod in the American Waterfront (Tokyo DisneySea).
- Gelatoni (appeared on June 30, 2014 at a fan event; officially introduced on July 4, 2014 at Tokyo DisneySea) is an artistic and creative green plush cat with a blue beret who sees beauty in everything. He is from Palazzo Canals in the Mediterranean Harbor (Tokyo DisneySea).
- StellaLou (appeared on March 23, 2017 at a fan event; officially introduced on March 30, 2017 at Tokyo DisneySea) is a spunky lavender plush rabbit with a blue scrunchie, a tutu, and ballet shoes. She is determined to become an excellent dancer and doesn't hesitate to work hard to reach her dream. She is from New York in the American Waterfront (Tokyo DisneySea).
- CookieAnn (July 3, 2018, at Hong Kong Disneyland) is a yellow plush dog with a chef's hat who loves to combine different things to come up with unique ideas such as novel recipes. She is from Main Street U.S.A (Hong Kong Disneyland). Her name was originally Cookie until it was changed to CookieAnn on October 29, 2019.
- 'Olu Mel (July 27, 2018, at Aulani, A Disney Resort & Spa) is a kindhearted and optimistic turtle who loves making music. He is good at creating musical instruments using things found in nature. In fact, he feels very close to nature, and sometimes, he even plays music with it. He loves Hawaii and is associated with Aulani, A Disney Resort & Spa. His costume character first appeared in Shanghai Disneyland on September 1, 2020, for Duffy Month. His name was originally 'Olu, until it was changed to 'Olu Mel.
- LinaBell (September 29, 2021, at Shanghai Disneyland) is an inquisitive pink plush fox with a purple orchid. She loves to solve problems and mysteries by finding clues using her trademark magnifying glass. Visitors were able to meet LinaBell at the Shanghai Disney Resort starting September 29, 2021. LinaBell arrived at Hong Kong Disneyland on September 9, 2022.
- TippyBlue is a mail-delivering seagull character who is considered to be ancillary to Duffy and Friends, though he is not a plush toy like the rest of the characters. He is somewhat a "scatterbrain" who accidentally spreads wrong information causing confusion among the recipients. He has appeared in some Duffy stories and has narrated in the My Friend Duffy shows in Cape Cod (Tokyo DisneySea).

== Park attractions ==
- "My Friend Duffy" show (at the Cape Cod Cook-Off Theatre in Cape Cod at Tokyo DisneySea)
- "Steps To Shine!" show (a show at the American Waterfront that is a successor to the previous show, "A Table Is Waiting"). It ran from July 11, 2017, to March 19, 2018. It would be replaced by another show, "Hello, New York!"
- The Duffy and Friends Show (near the entrance of Shanghai Disneyland). It started in May 2017.
- Duffy and Friends: Celebrating Together show (near the entrance of Shanghai Disneyland). It ran from September 2 to September 30, 2020, for the Duffy Month. This is the first time CookieAnn and 'Olu Mel speak.
- Duffy's Bedtime Story (a show at the Disneyland Paris hotel). This is the first time Duffy and ShellieMay speak in English.
- Duffy's Pre-Splashing Parade (a show that only runs in the summer at Shanghai Disneyland)
- A Duffy and Friends Celebration (a show at the Storybook Theatre at Hong Kong Disneyland)
- Stella Lou's Wonderful Wishes Ballet at Hong Kong Disneyland

== Online appearances ==
On June 30, 2020, the Disney Parks posted on YouTube a stop motion short called "Morning Glory" featuring Duffy and Friends. In 2021, another stop motion short called "Spring Surprise" was released. As part of LinaBell introduction, a stop motion called "Lost and Found" was released in 2021. During the Duffy and Friends panel at D23 (Disney fan event) in 2023, a stop motion short called "Lunchbox Mystery" featuring all seven Friends was shared.
