= List of dinosaur specimens sold at auction =

Many dinosaur specimens have been sold at auction, as part of the fossil trade. On average, around five dinosaur skeletons are put up for auction each year. These specimens are mostly purchased by wealthy private collectors and museums in Europe and the United States, though interest has been growing in China as well. The private sale of fossils has attracted criticism from paleontologists, as it presents an obstacle to fossils being publicly accessible to research.

Most countries where relatively complete dinosaur specimens are commonly found have laws against the export of fossils. The United States allows the sale of specimens collected on private property. As such, the majority of dinosaur fossils sold at auction were collected in the United States. However, smuggled specimens, particularly from Mongolia, also appear at auctions, often with falsified information on their source.

This list includes both specimens sold at auction and specimens that were scheduled to be sold at auction that have received news coverage.

== Table ==
Sortable table
Name (Spec #)	Taxon	Reported material	Discovery	Auction					Notes	Images	Source
Name (Spec #)	Taxon	Reported material	Discovery	Auction House	Date	Location	Sale price (USD)		Notes	Images	Source
Name (Spec #)	Taxon	Reported material	Discovery	Auction House	Date	Location	Original	Adjusted	Notes	Images	Source
	Unidentified	Nest with 10 eggs	Found in China	Bonhams	September 15, 1993	London	$76,000	$169,385	Purchaser was an anonymous American buyer. Collector also bought a set of 5 eggs at same auction for $18,750.		
Sue (Note: Named in honor of the discoverer) (FMNH PR 2081)	Tyrannosaurus rex	90% of a skeleton	Discovered August 12, 1990, by Sue Hendrickson in the Hell Creek Formation, South Dakota, United States Excavated by Hendrickson and the Black Hills Institute.	Sotheby's	October 4, 1997	New York City	$8,362,500 (Note: Price includes buyer's premium, winning bid of $7,600,000)	$16,771,805	Purchased by and now displayed at the Field Museum of Natural History. Most complete known specimen of Tyrannosaurus, and among the largest. Most expensive fossil sold until the sale of Stan in 2020.		
Barnum	Tyrannosaurus rex	20% of a skeleton	Collected by Japeth Boyce in Wyoming, United States in 1995	Bonhams	May 16, 2004	Los Angeles	$93,250 (Note: Price includes buyer's premium, winning bid of $80,000)	$158,949	Reported to potentially be the same individual as the first T. rex specimen ever discovered, now at the Natural History Museum, London.		
	Unidentified	Nest with 22 eggs	Collected in Guangdong, China in 1984	Bonhams	December 3, 2006	Los Angeles	$420,000	$670,766	Sale later cancelled and seized by customs agents.		
	Tarbosaurus bataar	Skull	Collected from Mongolia	I. M. Chait	March 25, 2007	New York City	$270,000 (Note: Includes buyer's premium; winning bid was $230,000)	$419,234	Specimen bought by actor Nicolas Cage. Specimen determined to have been illegally exported. Cage surrendered the specimen to authorities for repatriation to Mongolia in 2015		
	Triceratops	Skull		Maynards	January 8, 2009	Vancouver	$66,500 (Note: $70,000 Canadian dollars, reported as $60,000 USD in US sources.)	$99,796	Originated from the collection of a Japanese department store. Sold significantly below estimates.		
	Edmontosaurus			Maynards	January 8, 2009	Vancouver	$150,000	$225,105	Originated from the collection of a Japanese department store. Sold significantly below estimates.		
	Triceratops	80% complete skull	Collected in North Dakota, US	Bonhams	June 1, 2009	New York City	$242,000	$363,169			
	Alioramus remotus	Skull	Collected in "Central Asia" (presumably Mongolia)	Bonhams	June 1, 2009	New York City	$206,000	$309,144			
	Edmontosaurus	90% complete skeleton	Found near Ruth Mason Ranch near Faith, South Dakota, US sometime prior to 1991	Bonhams	October 3, 2009	Las Vegas	$458,000	$687,320			
	Allosaurus	Skeleton	Collected in Wyoming, US	Sotheby's	October 5, 2010	Paris	$1,815,450 (Note: €1,296,750)	$2,680,372	Said to originate from an old German collection		
Fighting Pair	Allosaurus + Stegosaurus	Stegosaurus: 75%–80% of a skeleton; incorporates elements of second specimen. Allosaurus: mostly complete, including complete skull	Collected in 2007 from Dana Quarry, Wyoming, US	Heritage Auctions	June 12, 2011	Dallas	$2,748,000	$3,932,973	A carnivorous and herbivorous dinosaur preserved together. Purchased by a museum.		
	Triceratops	"Virtually complete" skeleton along with a skull	Found in South Dakota, US in 2004, the skull and skeleton were found 750 ft apart, and it is not clear that they belong to the same individual	Heritage Auctions	June 12, 2011	Dallas	$657,250	$940,665	Auctioned in the same sale as "Fighting Pair"		
	Tarbosaurus bataar	Skeleton	Collected from Mongolia	Heritage Auctions	May 20, 2012	New York City	$1,050,000	$1,472,496	Sale later withdrawn. Subject of the legal case United States v. One Tyrannosaurus Bataar Skeleton and subsequently returned to Mongolia.		
Misty	Diplodocus	Skeleton	Collected from Dana Quarry, Wyoming, US, in 2009	Summers Place	November 27, 2013	Billingshurst	$652,000 (Note: £400,000)	$901,157	Purchased by the Natural History Museum of Denmark.		
Freya	Hypacrosaurus	Skeleton	Collected from Montana, US	Summers Place	June 7, 2016	Billingshurst	$178,200 (Note: £132,000 inc. buyers premium)	$239,058			
Kan	Allosaurus	Skeleton	Collected from Harlan Ranch, Johnson County, Wyoming, US, in 2013	Drouot	December 10, 2016	Paris	$1,155,000	$1,549,449	Sold to Kleber Rossillon, on display at the Château de Marqueyssac.		
	Triceratops	Skull	Collected in Wyoming, US	Drouot	March 7, 2017	Paris	$188,000	$246,932			
	Diplodocus/Kaatedocus (Note: Stated to be a Kaatedocus specimen in the auction listing, but reported as a Diplodocus specimen in news coverage)	Skeleton	Eastern Big Horn Mountains, Johnson County, Wyoming	Drouot	April 11, 2018	Paris	$1,771,200 (Note: €1.44m)	$2,270,920	Sold alongside an Allosaurus, both sold to same collector, a Filipino businessman		
	Allosaurus	60% complete skeleton	Eastern Big Horn Mountains, Johnson County, Wyoming	Drouot	April 11, 2018	Paris	$1,734,300 (Note: €1.41m)	$2,223,609	Sold alongside a Diplodocus, both sold to same collector, a Filipino businessman		
	Allosaurus	70% of a skeleton	Collected in 2013 in Wyoming, US	Drouot	June 4, 2018	Paris	$2,340,000	$3,000,199	Potentially represents a new species		
Maximus	Thescelosaurus	70%–75% of skeleton, including parts of skull	Collected in 2018 in the Hell Creek Formation, South Dakota, US	Piguet	September 24, 2019	Geneva	$226,000 (Note: 225,000 CHF)	$285,000			
Stan (Note: Named in honor of the discoverer) (BHI 3033)	Tyrannosaurus rex	70% of a skeleton	Hell Creek Formation, South Dakota, US Found by Stan Sacrison in 1987, and excavated by the Black Hills Institute in 1992.	Christie's	October 6, 2020	New York City	$31,800,000	$39,560,885	Purchased by the state of Abu Dhabi. Most expensive fossil ever sold until the sale of the Stegosaurus Apex in 2024. Sale did not include rights to reproduction, which were retained by Black Hills Institute of Geological Research. Numerous replicas are exhibited in museums worldwide.		
Big Sara	Allosaurus	Skeleton	Collected in Wyoming, US in 2016	Drouot	October 13, 2020	Paris	$3,466,000 (Note: €3 million)	$4,311,888			
Big John (Note: Named in honor of the owner of the land where the specimen was collected)	Triceratops	60% of a skeleton, including 75% of skull	Found by Walter Stein in May 2014, in the Hell Creek Formation, South Dakota, US Excavation complete by August 2015.	Drouot	October 21, 2021	Paris	$7,740,000 (Note: €6.65m)	$9,196,181	Purchased by an anonymous American collector. Guinness World Records claimed it was the largest known Triceratops skeleton, with a skull reconstructed to be 2.62 metres (8.6 ft) long. Most expensive Triceratops sold, and most expensive fossil sold in Europe.		
Hector	Deinonychus	Around 50% of a skeleton with 126 preserved bones, missing all or most of the skull	Excavated from Wolf Canyon, Carbon County, Montana, US from sediments of the Cloverly Formation in February 2015	Christie's	May 12, 2022	New York City	$12,412,500	$13,656,008	Previously displayed at the Natural History Museum of Denmark from 2020-2021		
	Gorgosaurus	Partial skeleton consisting of 79 elements	Excavated from the sediments of the Judith River Formation in Chouteau County, Montana, US, in 2018	Sotheby's	July 28, 2022	New York City	$6,069,500	$6,677,554			
	Triceratops	Skull	Excavated from the Hell Creek Formation in South Dakota, US	Sotheby's	July 28, 2022	New York City	$661,500	$727,770			
	Allosaurus	Articulated leg and foot	Excavated from Sutton Quarry in Moffat County, Colorado, US	Sotheby's	July 28, 2022	New York City	$163,800	$180,210			
Zephyr	Camptosauridae	Partial skeleton	Found near Skull Creek in Moffat County, Colorado, US in 2019	Giquello & Associés	October 20, 2022	Paris	$660,738	$726,932			
Maximus	Tyrannosaurus rex	Skull	Excavated from the Hell Creek Formation in Harding County, South Dakota, US in 2020	Sotheby's	December 9, 2022	New York City	$6,069,500	$6,677,554	Sold well below estimate of $15–20 million		
293 Trinity	Tyrannosaurus rex	Composite ~ 50% complete skeleton of 293 bones from three individuals	Excavated from several sites in the Hell Creek Formation, Montana and the Lance Formation, Wyoming, US between 2008 and 2013	Koller	April 18, 2023	Zurich	$6,200,000 (Note: 5,550,000 CHF)	$6,551,442			
Barry	Camptosaurus	80% complete skeleton with a largely complete skull	Discovered around 2000 in sediments of the Morrison Formation in Crook County, Wyoming, United States	Drouot	October 20, 2023	Paris	$985,447 (Note: € 932,100)	$1,041,306			
Apex	Stegosaurus	Largely complete skeleton, most complete known skeleton of Stegosaurus.	Discovered in 2020 in Moffat County, Colorado, US	Sotheby's	July 17, 2024	New York City	$44,600,000	$45,773,311	Sold 11 times above pre-sale estimates to American billionaire financier Kenneth Griffin. Most expensive fossil ever sold as of 2024.		
Vulcan	Apatosaurus	75-80% complete skeleton	Discovered in 2018 in Wyoming, United States	Collin du Bocage and Barbarossa	November 16, 2024	Paris	$6,400,000 (Note: ~€6,000,000)	$6,568,367			
	Allosaurus	Two skeletons, one adult one juvenile	Excavated between 1994 and 2018, in Carbon County, Wyoming, US	Christie's	December 12, 2024	London	$10,635,666 (Note: £8,130,000)	$10,915,463	Purchased by businessman Su Binghai, later confiscated by UK authorities under the Proceeds of Crime Act		
	Stegosaurus	Partial skeleton with "144 fossil bone elements"	Excavated between 2002 and 2018, in Carbon County, Wyoming, US	Christie's	December 12, 2024	London	$5,592,555 (Note: £4,275,000)	$5,739,681	Purchased by businessman Su Binghai, later confiscated by UK authorities under the Proceeds of Crime Act		
	Ceratosaurus	Partial skeleton of a juvenile, consisting of "139 original fossil bone elements with additional sculpted materials"	Discovered in the Bone Cabin Quarry (West), Wyoming, in 1996	Sotheby's	July 16, 2025	New York City	$30,510,000	$30,510,000	The specimen had been on display at the Museum of Ancient Life, Thanksgiving Point, Utah but was de-accessioned from the collection in 2024.		
	Pachycephalosaurus	Skull	Excavated in 2024 on privately owned land in the Hell Creek Formation, Perkins County, South Dakota	Sotheby's	July 16, 2025	New York City	$1,400,000	$1,400,000			
Cera	Triceratops	Complete skeleton of a juvenile	Excavated in 2016 in the South Dakotan section of the Hell Creek Formation	Phillips	November 20, 2025	New York City	$5,400,000	$5,400,000	Named after the Cera, a character from the cartoon The Land Before Time		
Spike	Caenagnathidae (oviraptorosaur)	Partial skeleton with 100 bones, including "jaws, hands, pelvis, and feet"	Excavated in 2022 from sediments of the Hell Creek Formation in South Dakota	Christie's	December 11, 2025	London	$4,657,056 (Note: £3,466,000)	$4,657,056			
Trey	Triceratops	Largely complete adult skeleton	Excavated in 1993 from the Lance Formation near Lusk, Wyoming.	Joopiter	March 31, 2026	Online	$5,500,000	$5,500,000	Previously on display at the Wyoming Dinosaur Center		
Gus	Tyrannosaurus	"skeleton, judged to be one of the largest and most complete ever unearthed" "approximately 61% complete by bone count, 75 to 80% complete in terms of bone mass"	Excavated in 2021 onwards from the Hell Creek Formation, Harding County, South Dakota, United States	Sothebys	July 14, 2026	New York	$50,100,000	$50,100,000	Named for Gary "Gus" Licking, land-owner of the excavation site.		
	Allosaurus	Skull	Excavated from 1996 to 1997 from the Morrison Formation in Moffat County, Colorado, United States	Sotheby's	July 14, 2026	New York	$1,536,000	$1,536,000	The estimate had been $800,000 to $1,200,000.		
	Tyrannosaurus	Leg	Excavated from the Hell Creek Formation in Ziebach County, South Dakota, United States	Sotheby's	July 14, 2026	New York	$1,792,000	$1,792,000			
	Gryposaurus	Skeleton "with additional cast elements"	Excavated from the Judith River Formation in Choteau County, Montana, United States	Sotheby's	July 14, 2026	New York	$1,280,000	$1,280,000			
Jodi	Nanotyrannus	"Skeleton with about 191 fossil-bone elements"	Excavated from the Hell Creek Formation in Montana, United States	Sotheby's	October 27, 2026	New York	$47,255,000	$47,255,000	The estimated price was $9,000,000.		

=== Specimens planned to be auctioned ===
Some specimens planned to be auctioned did not sell, due to failing to meet the reserve price, legal challenges, or other obstacles. This list also includes specimens whose planned auction was announced, but for which information on whether it was sold is not available.

Sortable table
Name (Spec #)	Taxon	Material	Discovery	Auction			Notes	Images	Source
Name (Spec #)	Taxon	Material	Discovery	Auction House	Date	Location	Notes	Images	Source
Z-Rex	Tyrannosaurus		Found in South Dakota, US in 1992	eBay	December 1999	N/A	Disrupted by prank bidders		
Z-Rex	Tyrannosaurus		Found in South Dakota, US in 1992	Millionaire.com	January 2000	N/A			
	Conchoraptor		Found in China	Guernsey's	June 2004	New York City	Failed to receive a single bid.		
	Stygimoloch	Largely complete skull	Near Gumbo Butte, Montana, US	Guernsey's	June 2004	New York City	Failed to meet reserve price		
	Triceratops		Found in North Dakota, US, in 2004	Christie's	April 2008	Paris	Failed to meet reserve price, subsequently purchased by an American collector		
	Dryosaurus		Found in Wyoming, US in 1993	I. M. Chait	March 2009	New York City	Failed to meet reserve price. Subsequently purchased by businessman John Middleton and donated to the Beneski Museum of Natural History at Amherst College. Reported to be one of the most complete Dryosaurus specimens.		
Samson	Tyrannosaurus	55% complete skeleton	Near Buffalo, South Dakota, US prior to 1994	Bonhams	October 2009	Las Vegas	Failed to meet reserve price at auction, subsequently purchased by an undisclosed buyer		
	Prosaurolophus	Skeleton with mummified skin		Sotheby's	October 2011	Paris	Failed to meet reserve price		
CLOVER Le Combattant	Tenontosaurus	Largely complete skeleton	Montana, US in 2008	Sotheby's	October 2011	Paris	Failed to meet reserve price		
	Suuwassea			Sotheby's	October 2011	Paris	Failed to meet reserve price		
	Triceratops	Skull		Sotheby's	October 2011	Paris	Failed to meet reserve price		
Dueling Dinosaurs	Nanotyrannus lancensis + Triceratops		Montana, US, in 2006	Bonhams	November 2013	New York City	Failed to meet reserve price		
Dragon King	Triceratops	95% complete skull	Montana, US First spotted by landowner Ray Novakovich in 1992, but not excavated until 2003.	Evolved LTD	2015	Hong Kong	Reported in 2015 to be largest known Triceratops skull, at 2.8 metres (9.2 ft) long. Unclear if the specimen was sold.		
Little Al	Allosaurus	Juvenile skeleton	Wyoming, US, in 2009	Summers Place	November 2015	Billingshurst	Failed to meet reserve price		
	Stegosaurus		Wyoming, US, in 2010	Auctionata	June 2016	Berlin	Failed to meet reserve price		
	Allosaurus	55% of a skeleton	Found in the United States	Artcurial	November 2018	Paris	Failed to meet reserve price		
	Camptosaurus	90% complete	Wyoming, US	Artcurial	November 2018	Paris	Failed to meet reserve price		
	Ornitholestes + Othnielia	Two skeletons mounted in a combat pose	Johnson County, Wyoming, US	Drouot	April 2019	Paris	Failed to meet reserve price		
	Hypacrosaurus	Adult and juvenile skeleton	Glacier County, Montana, US	Drouot	April 2019	Paris	Failed to meet reserve price		
Skinny	Diplodocidae	90% of skeleton, with preserved patches of skin	Wyoming, US in 2012	Drouot	June 2019	Paris	Potentially a new species. Displayed in Heathrow Airport in April–May 2019, prior to auction. Failed to meet reserve price.		
	Diplodocus		Dana Quarry, Wyoming, US in 2008	Emirates Auction	August–September 2019	Dubai	Originally at The Dubai Mall, no bidders	On display at the Dubai Mall	
Shen	Tyrannosaurus	Partial skeleton with 80 bones	Excavated in Montana, US in 2020 from sediments of the Hell Creek Formation	Christie's	November 2022	Hong Kong	Sale cancelled after it became known that the casts used to replace missing bones were based on those of Stan, which is the intellectual property of the Black Hills Institute of Geological Research		

== See also ==
- Fossil trade
- Antiquities trade
