= Big Sara =

Allosaurus fossil

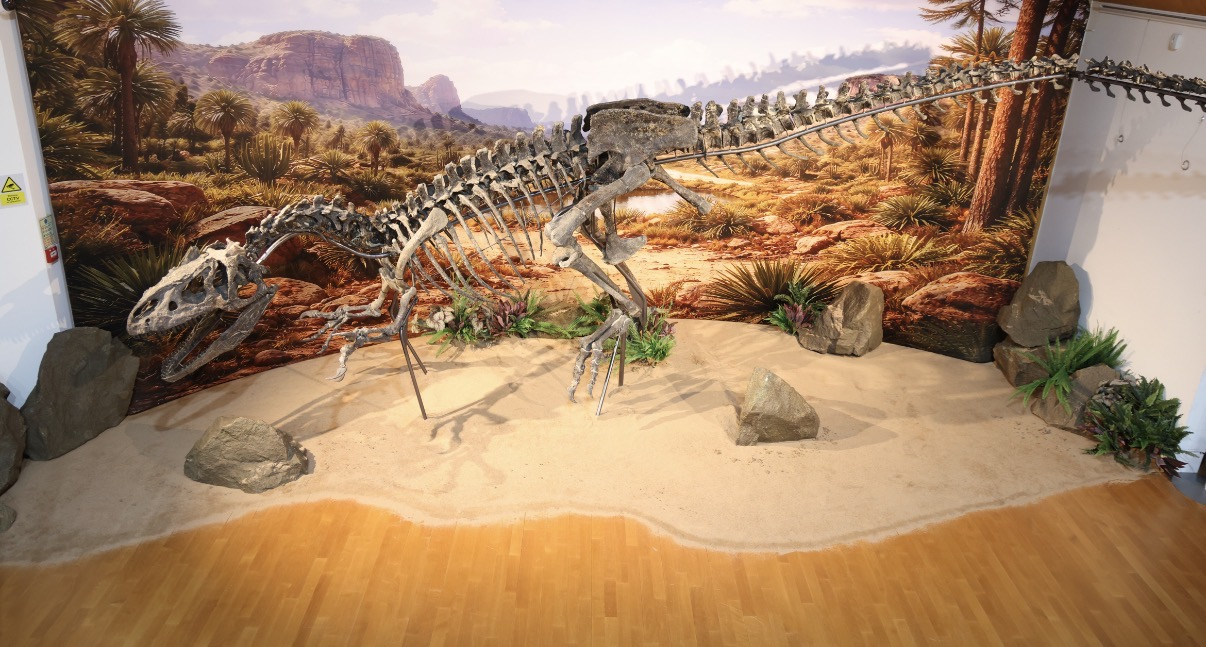
- Big Sara on display at The Etches Collection, Kimmeridge, United Kingdom
- Common name: Big Sara
- Species: Allosaurus, species uncertain
- Age: 150 million years
- Place discovered: Wyoming, United States
- Date discovered: 2015

Big Sara is a fossilized specimen of an unknown species in the genus Allosaurus, discovered in Wyoming's Morrison Formation in 2015. Dated to the Late Jurassic epoch, it stands 3.5 metres high and 10 metres long, and is one of the largest and most complete Allosaurus fossils in the world, with around 70% of the bones present. On October 13, 2020, the specimen was sold at Hôtel Drouot for €3,067,400 to finance billionaire James Benamor, making it at the time the highest-priced Allosaurus fossil ever sold at auction.

== Exhibitions ==
=== Westquay, Southampton ===
In June 2022, the fossil was loaned to Westquay Shopping Centre where it was displayed for two years.

=== The Etches Collection Museum of Jurassic Marine Life, Kimmeridge ===
In March 2026, the fossil was loaned to The Etches Collection in Kimmeridge, United Kingdom, and is planned to be exhibited there for two years. Big Sara is the largest Allosaurus on display in the UK and her exhibit at The Etches Collection makes Sara the only real dinosaur on display in Dorset.
