= Apex (dinosaur) =

Stegosaurus fossil

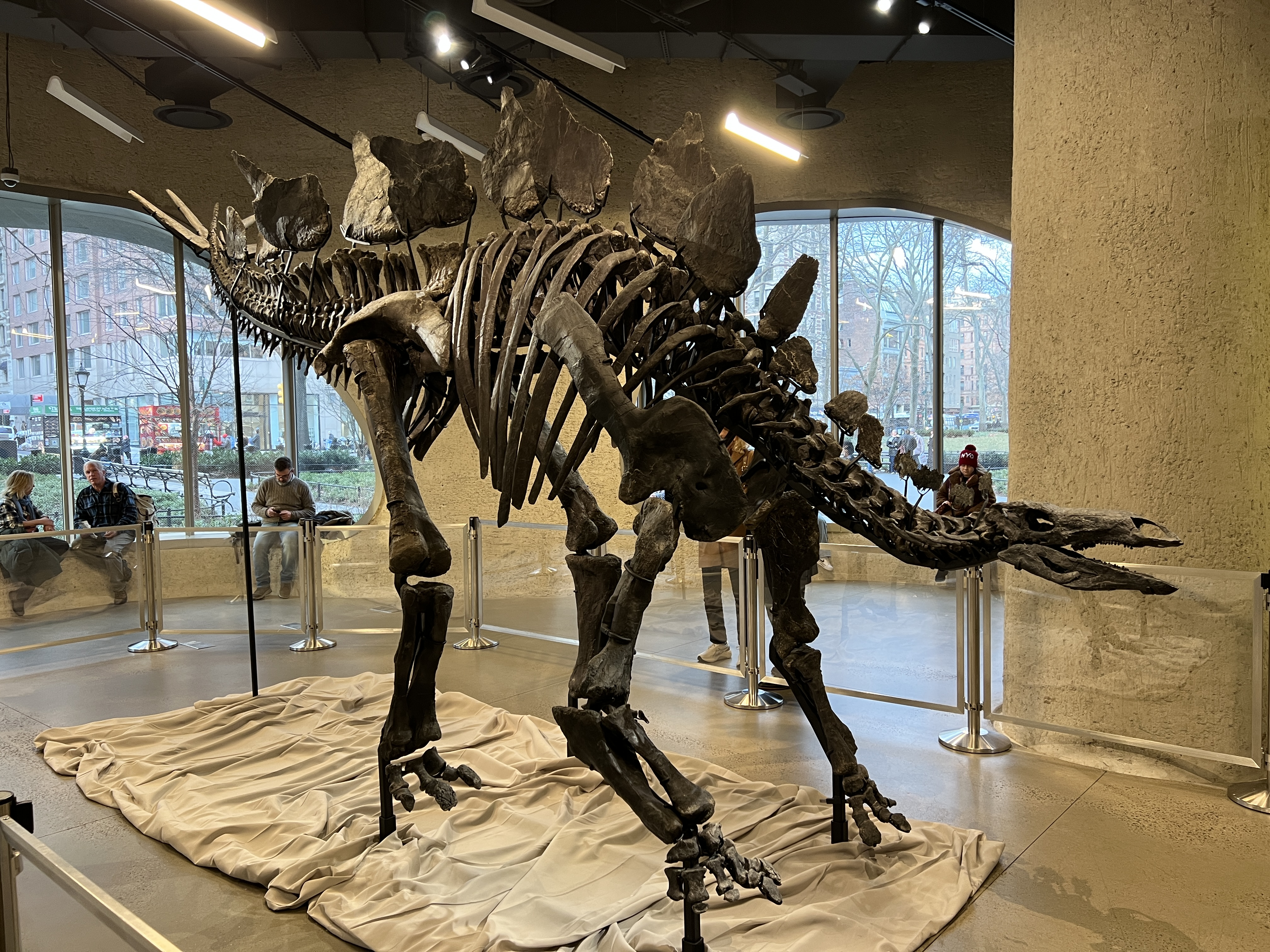
- Apex on temporary loan at the American Museum of Natural History
- Common name: Apex
- Species: Stegosaurus, species uncertain
- Age: 150 million years
- Place discovered: Colorado, United States
- Date discovered: May 2022
- Discovered by: Jason Cooper

Apex is a fossilized specimen of an unknown species in the genus Stegosaurus, discovered in Colorado's Morrison Formation in 2022. Dated to the Late Jurassic epoch, it is the largest known Stegosaurus fossil, preserving skin impressions and throat ossicles alongside a mostly complete skeleton. On July 17, 2024, the specimen was sold at Sotheby's for $44.6 million to hedge fund billionaire Kenneth Griffin, making it, at the time, the highest-priced fossil ever sold at auction. The sale sparked debate among paleontologists regarding the purchase by private individuals of specimens with high scientific value.

In December 2024, the fossil was loaned to the American Museum of Natural History, and is planned to be exhibited there for four years. Researchers aim to identify Apex's species, and study its growth pattern.

== Description ==
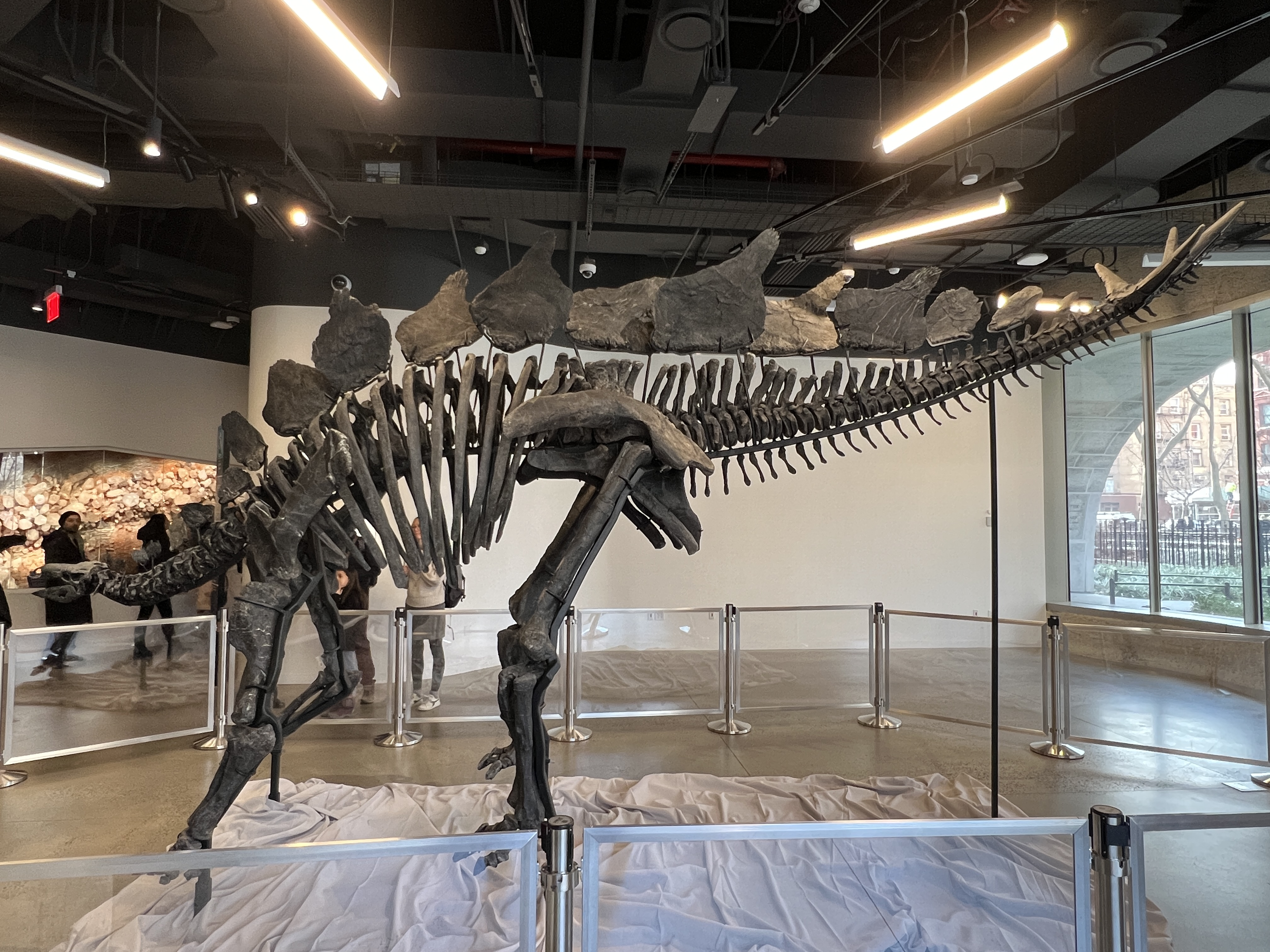
Side view

Apex is the largest and second most complete known Stegosaurus skeleton as of 2024, with 254 bones preserved out of approximately 319 (compared to Sophie's 360). It measures 3.4 meters (11 ft) in height and 8.2 meters (27 ft) in length. The specimen is around 150 million years old, dating to the Late Jurassic epoch. The exact species it belongs to is not known.

It has been compared to the Stegosaurus stenops specimen Sophie, which is at the time of Apex's sale the most complete Stegosaurus skeleton on public display, although Apex has been described as being 30% larger. The proportions of the specimen have been described as unusual, having comparatively long legs and square-bottom plates.

Alongside the skeleton, three ossicles from the stegosaur's throat armor were preserved. Skin impressions from the neck have also been preserved, although the lack of impressions from the lower body means that its sex cannot be deduced. The specimen was found in a death pose, with its tail curled under its body.

=== Osteology ===
The animal to which it belonged was elderly, as attested by signs of rheumatoid arthritis such as the fusion of the sacral bones. No traces of injuries caused by combat or predation, or of post-mortem scavenging, are present on the fossil. According to Sotheby's head of science and popular culture Cassandra Hatton, the specimen likely died of old age. Bubbles have been found in bones in the pelvic area, understood to have been caused by mating-related infections.

== Discovery ==
Apex was discovered in May 2022 by commercial paleontologist Jason Cooper in Moffat County, Colorado, on private land near the town of Dinosaur. The fossil was found encased in hard sandstone. No other fossils were found nearby, although the area is part of the larger Morrison Formation. Excavation of the specimen lasted until October 2023.

The New York broker Sotheby's, which would later put the fossil to auction, claimed to have worked alongside Jason Cooper since the discovery in order to bring the fossil to the market, documenting the process along the way. Several explanations for the name "Apex" have been provided. According to Sotheby's, the name was given to highlight the importance of the specimen within Stegosaurus, owing to its high degree of preservation. Robb Report stated that the name referred to the preeminent position of Stegosaurus in the Late Jurassic ecosystem, while Smithsonian described it as referring to the specimen's size.

== Auction ==
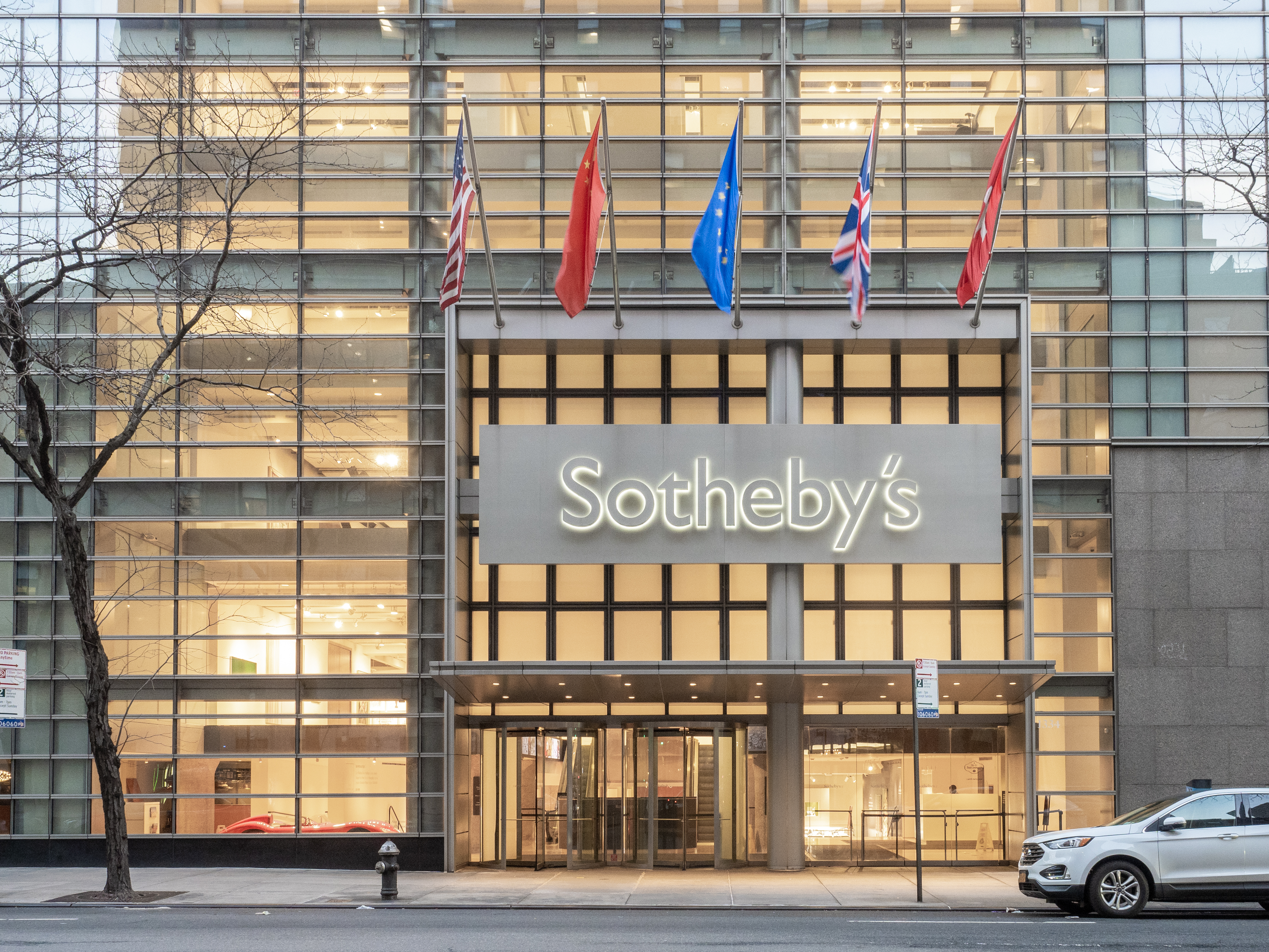
Sotheby's New York auction house, where Apex was put up for sale

Apex was put to auction at Sotheby's in New York City on July 17, 2024, with a pre-sale estimate of between $4 million and $6 million. Seven bidders took part in the auction, which began at $3 million. After 15 minutes, the specimen was sold to an anonymous buyer for $44.6 million, or 11 times its lower pre-sale estimate. It was stated by Sotheby's to be the highest-priced fossil ever sold at auction, as well as the first Stegosaurus to be put to auction. At the time of the auction, the fossil was mounted on a steel armature, and positioned in an attacking stance. The missing bones were replaced by sculpted and 3D-printed replicas, including mirrored versions of existing material. The auction lot also included 3D scans of the fossil, with a license to use the scan data.

On July 18, the buyer was revealed to be billionaire Kenneth Griffin, founder and CEO of the hedge fund Citadel LLC. Griffin intended to put the specimen on loan to an American institution, claiming after the auction that "Apex was born in America and is going to stay in America!"

=== Reactions ===
The announcement of Apex's auctioning to private bidders gave rise to concern from paleontologists, with Society of Vertebrate Paleontology vice-president Stuart Sumida criticizing the trend of major specimens being purchased by private individuals rather than research institutions. In May 2024, Steve Brusatte commented that Stegosaurus fossils were comparatively rarer than other dinosaur genera such as Triceratops or Tyrannosaurus. Brusatte argued that the skeleton should be displayed in a museum, making it accessible for both scientific and educational purposes, rather than be kept in a private collection, expressing his hopes that the buyer would donate the specimen to a museum for public display. Both Brusatte and University of Adelaide professor Diego C. García-Bellido stated that scientific institutions were unable to keep up with private buyers at auctions. The pre-sale estimate of $6 million was described as being already out of range for most museums by García-Bellido, who also added that many of them might not have the necessary infrastructure to display the skeleton. The given price range has been described by paleontologist Cary Woodruff as arbitrary given the scientific value of the specimen.

The display was also criticized, with Sumida commenting that the reconstruction and mounting required artistic choices, which would lessen the scientific and educational value of the specimen. In a Chicago Tribune opinion, paleontologist Nathan D. Smith suggested that the skeleton be displayed as a centerpiece in the context of the Morrison Formation rather than as a standalone specimen, comparing it to the exhibit of the Tyrannosaurus specimen Sue at the Field Museum of Natural History.

Both discoverer Jason Cooper and Sotheby's science department head Cassandra Hatton stated that they hoped for the specimen to be acquired by a scientific institution. In May 2024, Cooper stated that the future owner would be able to collect contextual information on the discovery site. Hatton stated that, despite widespread concerns, she had not seen fossils be lost to private collections, with buyers usually donating them to museums instead.

== Loan and research ==
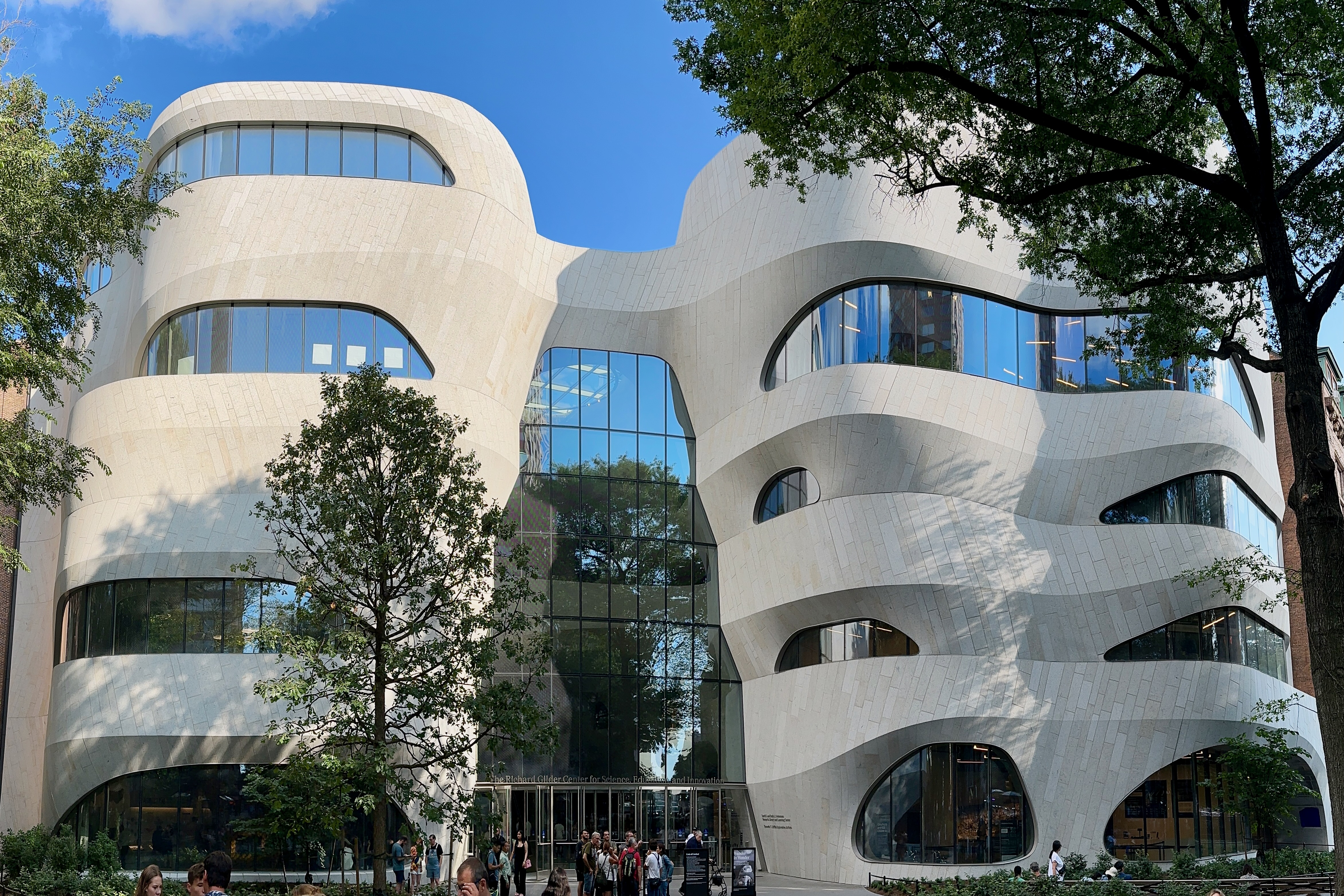
The Richard Gilder Center, where Apex is on public display

In December 2024, it was announced that Apex was loaned to the American Museum of Natural History, who had contacted Kenneth Griffin during the summer. The specimen was revealed on December 5 to an excited crowd of schoolchildren. The fossil was placed on public display on December 8, and intended to be replaced by a cast after four years. It debuted in the Richard Gilder Center for Science, Education, and Innovation, where it was stationed in an atrium near the entrance. The choice of museum was described as surprising, given Griffin's previous ties to the Field Museum in Chicago. While Griffin had already donated once to the American Museum of Natural History, he had never previously worked with their paleontology department. Apex was disassembled between September and October 2025, in order for each fossil bone to be documented, before being relocated to the museum's fourth floor.

A three-year postdoctoral fellowship was funded by Griffin to identify Apex's species and study its growth pattern. While Apex was disassembled, its bones were studied through structured-light 3D scanning, infrared scanning, and CT scanning. This allowed researchers to distinguish between original and restored material, and to examine the internal structure of the fossils. The resulting scans were made available to scientists worldwide. A wedge was also extracted from the femur, in order to produce the first growth curve of Stegosaurus. According to museum curator Roger Benson, the possibility of sharing the three-dimensional scans with researchers was a necessary condition for the loan.

As the specimen might not be accessible in the future, concerns have been raised over conducting research on a privately owned, loaned fossil. The matter was described by Stuart Sumida as "a new gray area". On June 18, 2025, the Society of Vertebrate Paleontology wrote an open letter to the AMNH over their decisions regarding Apex, in which they criticized the lack of a binding agreement over long-term access to the specimen, and stated that conducting research on a loaned fossil might incentivize future sales to private individuals.

== See also ==
- Stan (dinosaur), previously the most expensive fossil to be sold
