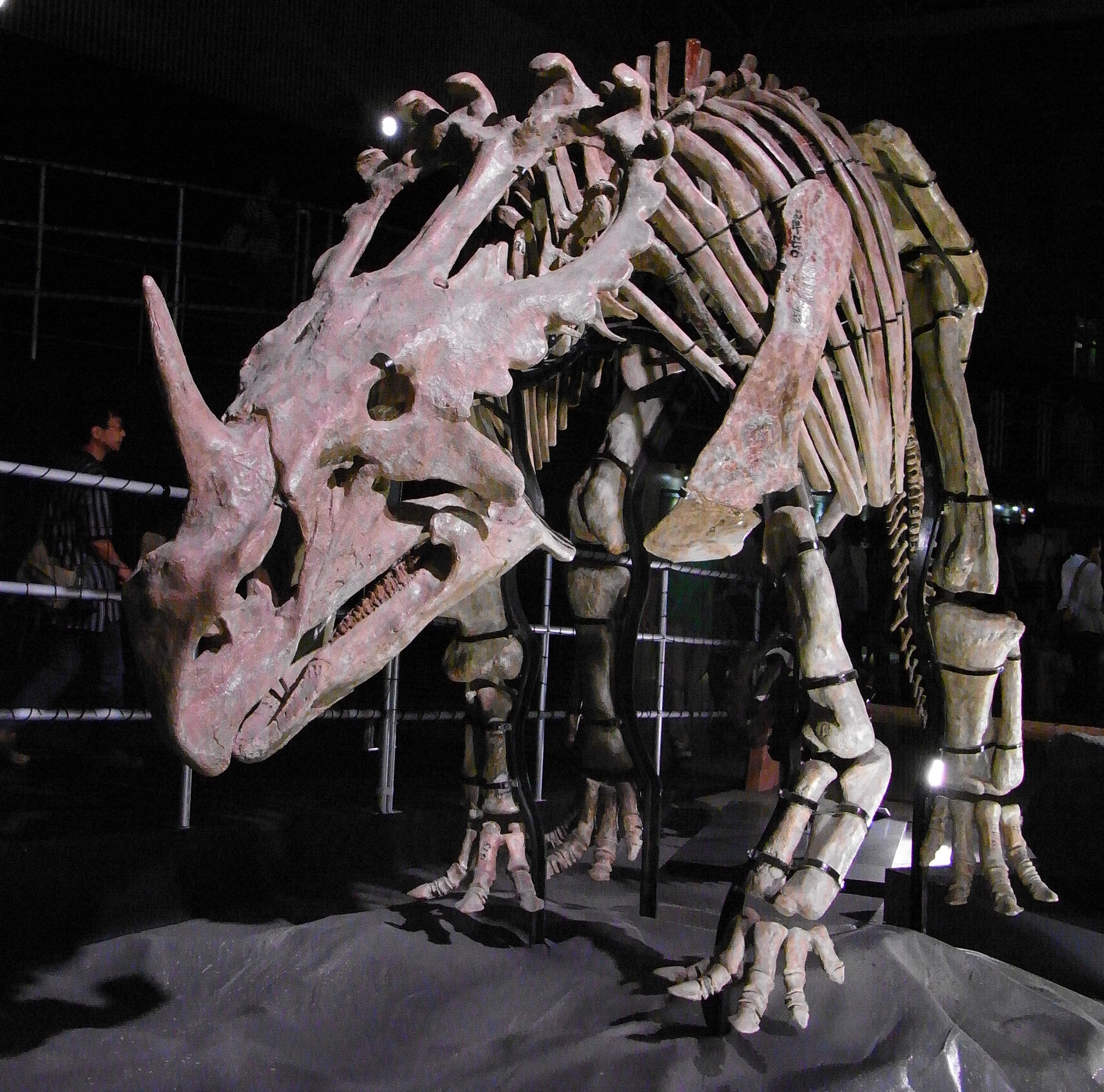
- Reconstructed skeleton

Scientific classification
- Kingdom: Animalia
- Phylum: Chordata
- Class: Reptilia
- Clade: Dinosauria
- Clade: †Ornithischia
- Clade: †Ceratopsia
- Family: †Ceratopsidae
- Subfamily: †Centrosaurinae
- Genus: †Sinoceratops; Xu et al., 2010

Type species
- †Sinoceratops zhuchengensis Xu et al., 2010

= Sinoceratops =

Sinoceratops Temporal range: Late Cretaceous (Campanian) 77.3–73.5 Ma

Extinct genus of dinosaurs

Sinoceratops /ˌsaɪnoʊˈsɛrətɒps/ is an extinct genus of ceratopsian dinosaur that lived from 77.3 to 73.5 million years ago during the latter part of the Cretaceous Period in what is now Shandong province in China. It was named in 2010 by Xu Xing et al. for three skulls from Zhucheng, China. The name of the type species Sinoceratops zhuchengensis means "Chinese horned face from Zhucheng", after the location of its discovery. Sinoceratops was a medium-sized, averagely-built, ground-dwelling, quadrupedal herbivore. It could grow up to an estimated 5 metres (16 ft) in length and weigh up to 2 tonnes (2.0 long tons; 2.2 short tons).

It was the first ceratopsid dinosaur discovered in China, and the only ceratopsid known from Asia. All other centrosaurines and all chasmosaurines are known from fossils discovered in North America. Sinoceratops is also significant due to the fact it is one of the largest known centrosaurines, and is much larger than any other known basal members of this group. This genus was discovered in the Hongtuya Formation (a unit of the Wangshi Group) which was deposited during the late Cretaceous. The most common animal in the formation was the saurolophine Shantungosaurus, to which most of the material has been assigned. Animals that lived alongside Sinoceratops and Shantungosaurus included the leptoceratopsid Zhuchengceratops, the titanosaur Zhuchengtitan, and the tyrannosaurine Zhuchengtyrannus.

== Discovery ==
Illustration of the known front portion of the skull

The holotype specimen ZCDM V0010, consisting of a partial skull, including a braincase, was in the summer of 2008 recovered at the Hongtuya Formation of the Wangshi Group in Shandong, China. The Wangshi Group is dated between 77.3 to 73.5 million years ago. Two other specimens have been recovered from the same formation. Specimen ZCDM V0011 is a partial skull that consists of the skull roof and most of the braincase, and ZCDM V0012 represents a partial braincase.

The genus name Sinoceratops means "Chinese horned face", and is derived from the word Sino- referring to China from Latin Sina, the country of its discovery, and the Greek words keras (κέρας) meaning "horn", and ops (ωψ) meaning "face". Sinoceratops was described and named by paleontologist Xu Xing and colleagues, in 2010. The type species is Sinoceratops zhuchengensis. The specific name refers to the location of its discovery, the city of Zhucheng which also financed the excavations.

The discovery was significant, because it represented the first ceratopsid known from China, and possibly the only ceratopsid from Asia, though indeterminate ceratopsian remains found around the same time have been unearthed in Russia. The only other possible Asian ceratopsid is Turanoceratops; its position within the Ceratopsidae, however, is contested.

== Description ==
Size comparison

Sinoceratops was a large ceratopsian, with an estimated length of 5 metres (16 ft) and body mass of 2 tonnes (2.0 long tons; 2.2 short tons). It has a short, hooked horn on its nose (called a nasal horn), no horns above its eyes (brow horns), and a short neck frill with a series of forward-curving hornlets that gave the frill a crown-like appearance. Inside this row of hornlets there is a series of low knobs on the top of the frill, which are not seen in any other horned dinosaur. Sinoceratops is a member of the short-frilled ceratopsids, the Centrosaurinae. Holotype specimen ZCDM V0010 consists of a partial skull with most elements of the skull roof and partial braincase. The skull of Sinoceratops is estimated to be 180 cm (5.9 ft) long making it one of the largest known centrosaurine skulls.

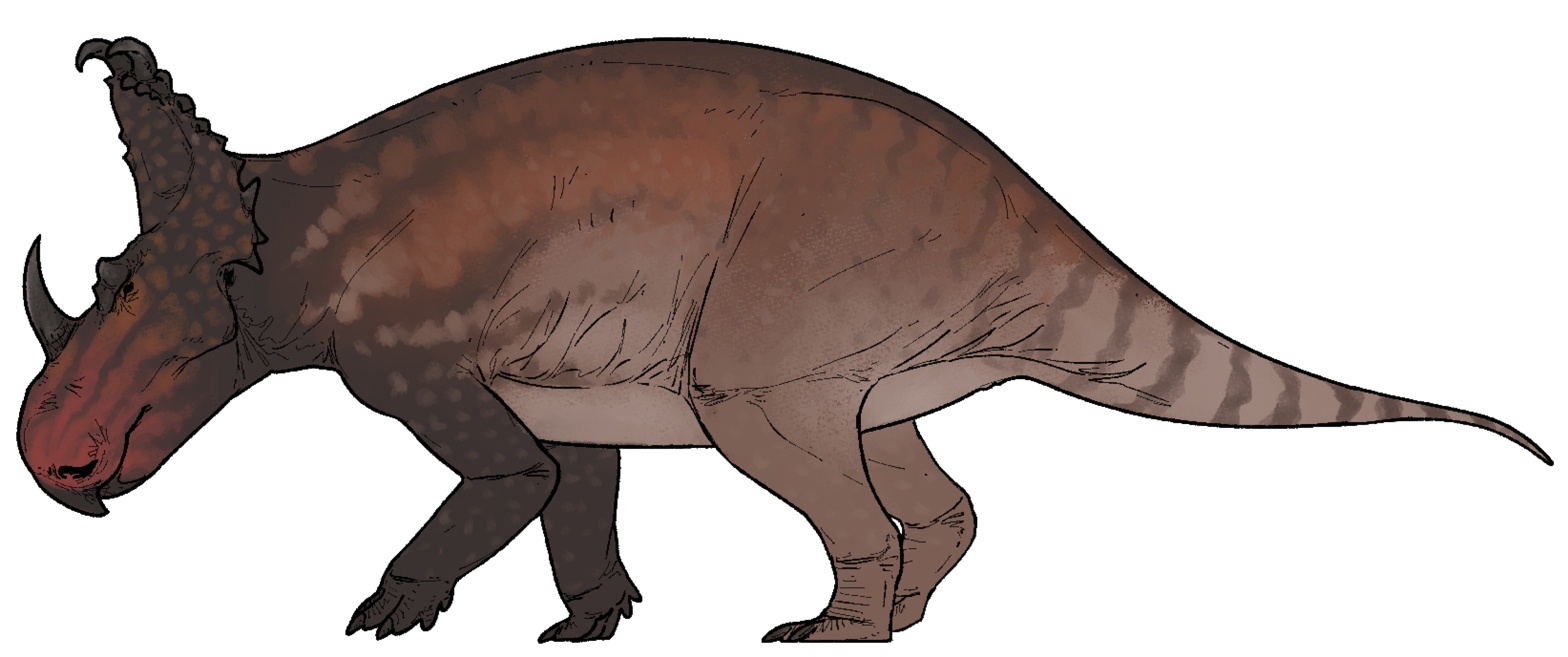
Life reconstruction of S. zhuchengensis.

Features that differentiate an animal from most or all others are called a diagnosis. Some, but not all, of the features in a diagnosis are also autapomorphies. An autapomorphy is a distinctive anatomical feature that is unique to a given organism. According to Xu et al. (2010), Sinoceratops can be distinguished based on the following diagnostic characteristics: there are at least ten robust, strongly curved hornlike processes along the rear margin of the combined parietals, while at the same time at least four hornlike processes on the combined squamosals are present; there is a large accessory fenestra in front of the antorbital fenestra (differing from all other known centrosaurines); the external margin of the parietals is only weakly undulating (differing from all other known centrosaurines); and the presence of broad-based epoccipitals (differing from all other known centrosaurines).

== Classification ==
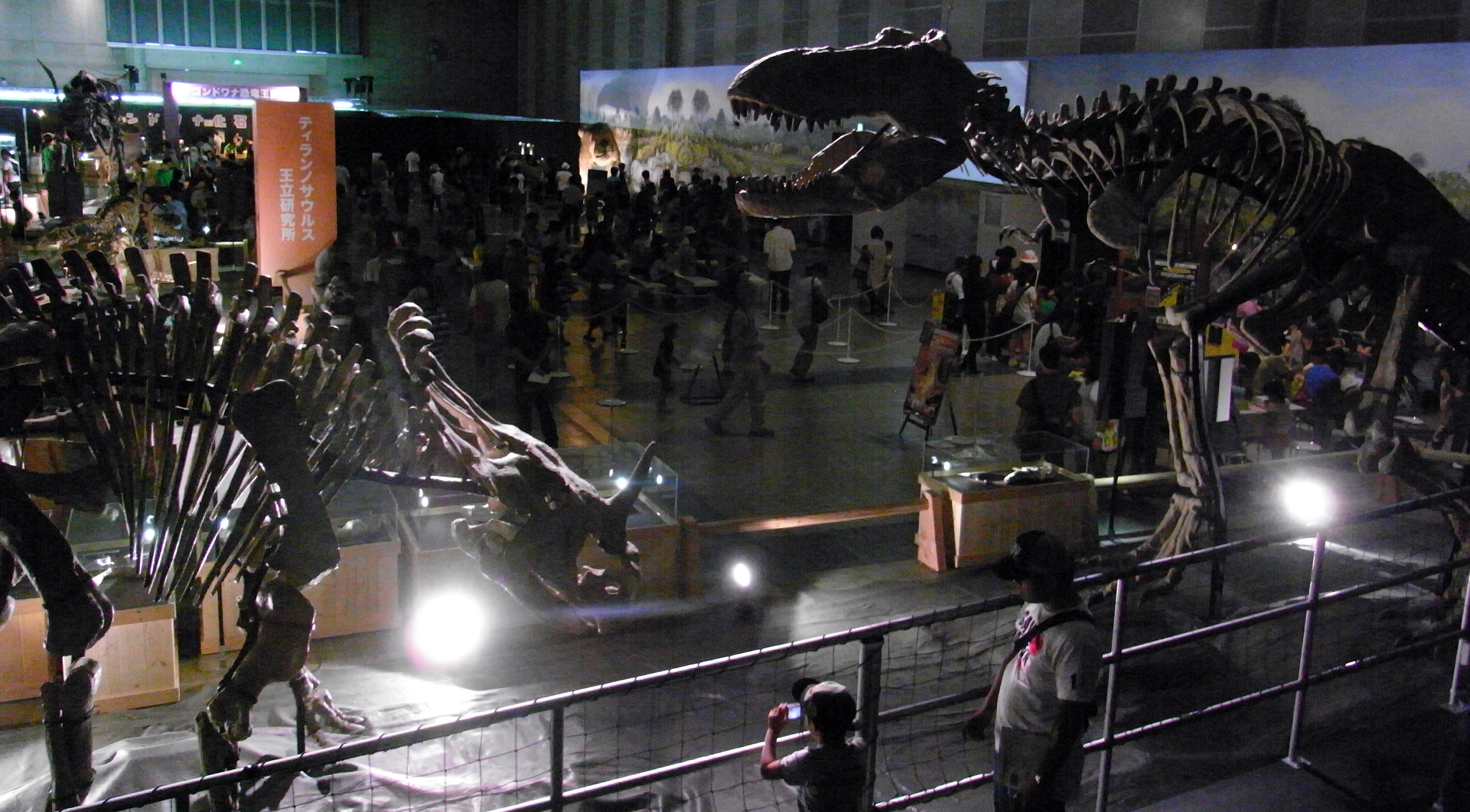
Sinoceratops skeleton mounted as if confronting Zhuchengtyrannus

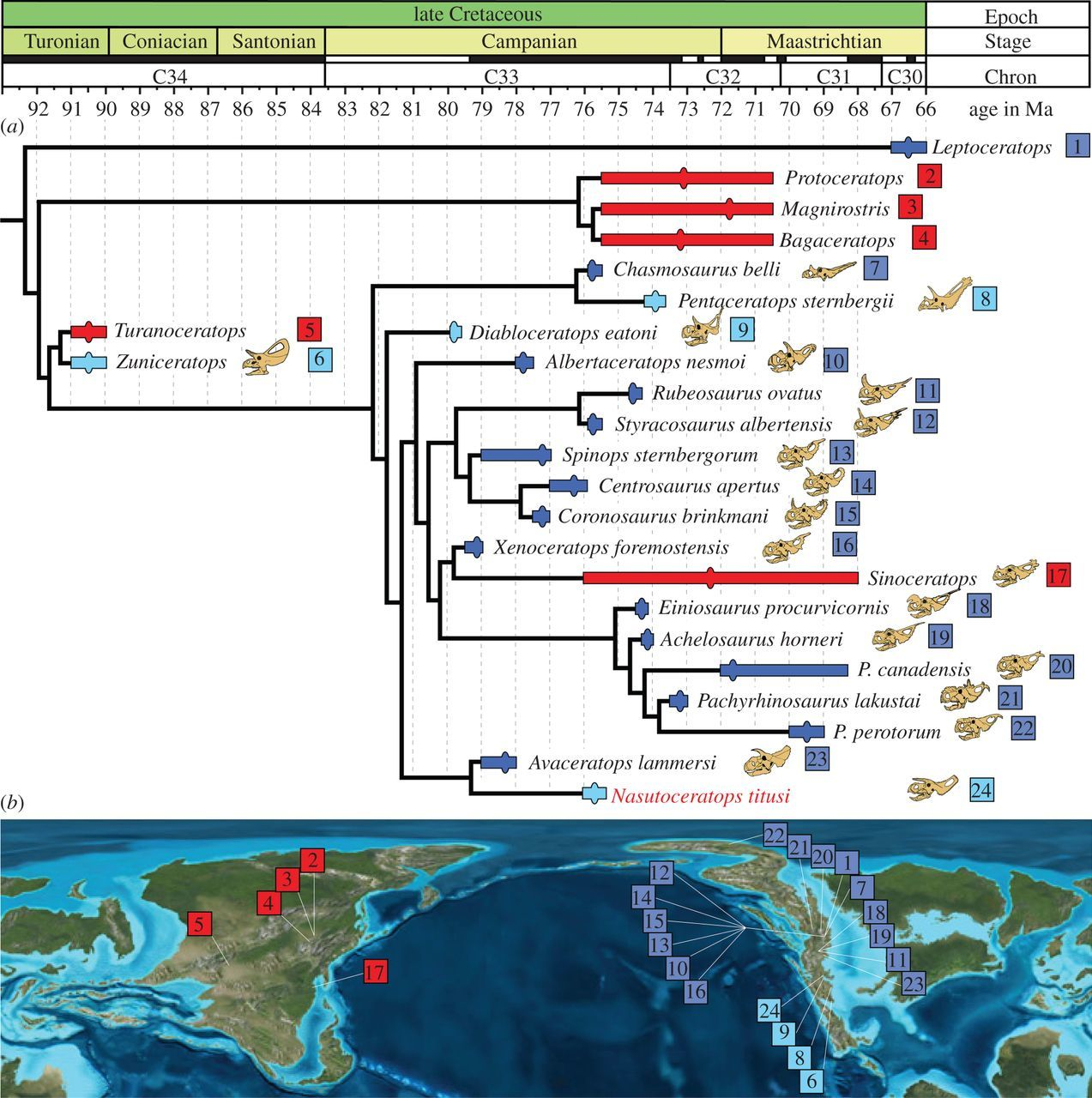
Time-calibrated phylogenetic relationships of Ceratopsidae (above), and paleogeographic map of the Late Cretaceous with distribution of ceratopsids (below), following Sampson and colleagues, 2013. Sinoceratops is 17

Sinoceratops was assigned to the taxon Centrosaurinae, as a basal member by Xu et al. (2010) based on characteristics present in the skull. Sinoceratops bears several characteristics that resemble features in chasmosaurines, blurring the distinction between the Centrosaurinae and Chasmosaurinae. According to Xu e.a. the basal position of Sinoceratops indicates that ceratopsids originated in Asia. Sinoceratops however, shares a number of features with advanced centrosaurines such as Centrosaurus and Styracosaurus that are not seen in primitive centrosaurines like Diabloceratops, including a well-developed nose horn and reduced brow horns. The implication might be that this genus represents a lineage that invaded Asia from North America through Beringia.

The cladogram below represents a phylogenetic analysis by Chiba et al. (2017):

- Centrosaurinae
  - - Diabloceratops eatoni
    - Machairoceratops cronusi
  - - Nasutoceratopsini
      - Avaceratops lammersi (ANSP 15800)
      - MOR 692
      - CMN 8804
      - Nasutoceratops titusi
      - Malta new taxon
    - - Xenoceratops foremostensis
      - - - Sinoceratops zhuchengensis
          - Wendiceratops pinhornensis
        - Albertaceratops nesmoi
        - Medusaceratops lokii
        - Eucentrosaura
          - Centrosaurini
            - - Rubeosaurus ovatus
              - Styracosaurus albertensis
            - - Coronosaurus brinkmani
              - - Centrosaurus apertus
                - Spinops sternbergorum
          - Pachyrhinosaurini
            - Einiosaurus procurvicornis
            - Pachyrostra
              - Achelousaurus horneri
              - - Pachyrhinosaurus canadensis
                - - Pachyrhinosaurus lakustai
                  - Pachyrhinosaurus perotorum

== Paleoecology ==
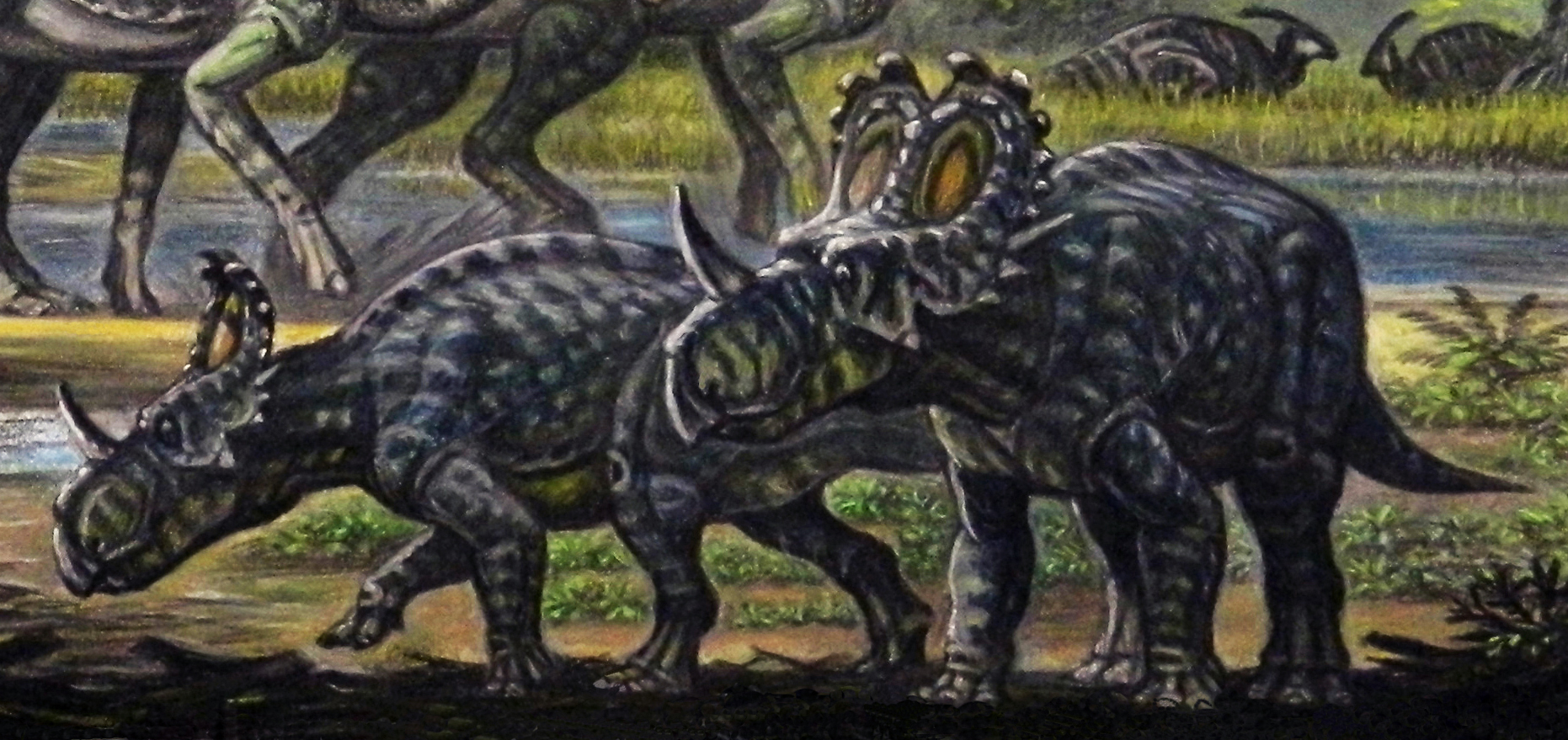
Restoration of a pair

Sinoceratops is known from the Xingezhuang Formation of eastern China. It is known from skull material. Alongside it, in the formation, lived Shantungosaurus, a very common hadrosaurid to which most of the material has been assigned, Zhuchengtyrannus, an Asian tyrannosaurid related to Tarbosaurus, Zhuchengceratops, an Asian leptoceratopsid, and Huaxiaosaurus, a possible older individual of Shantungosaurus.

== See also ==
- Timeline of ceratopsian research
