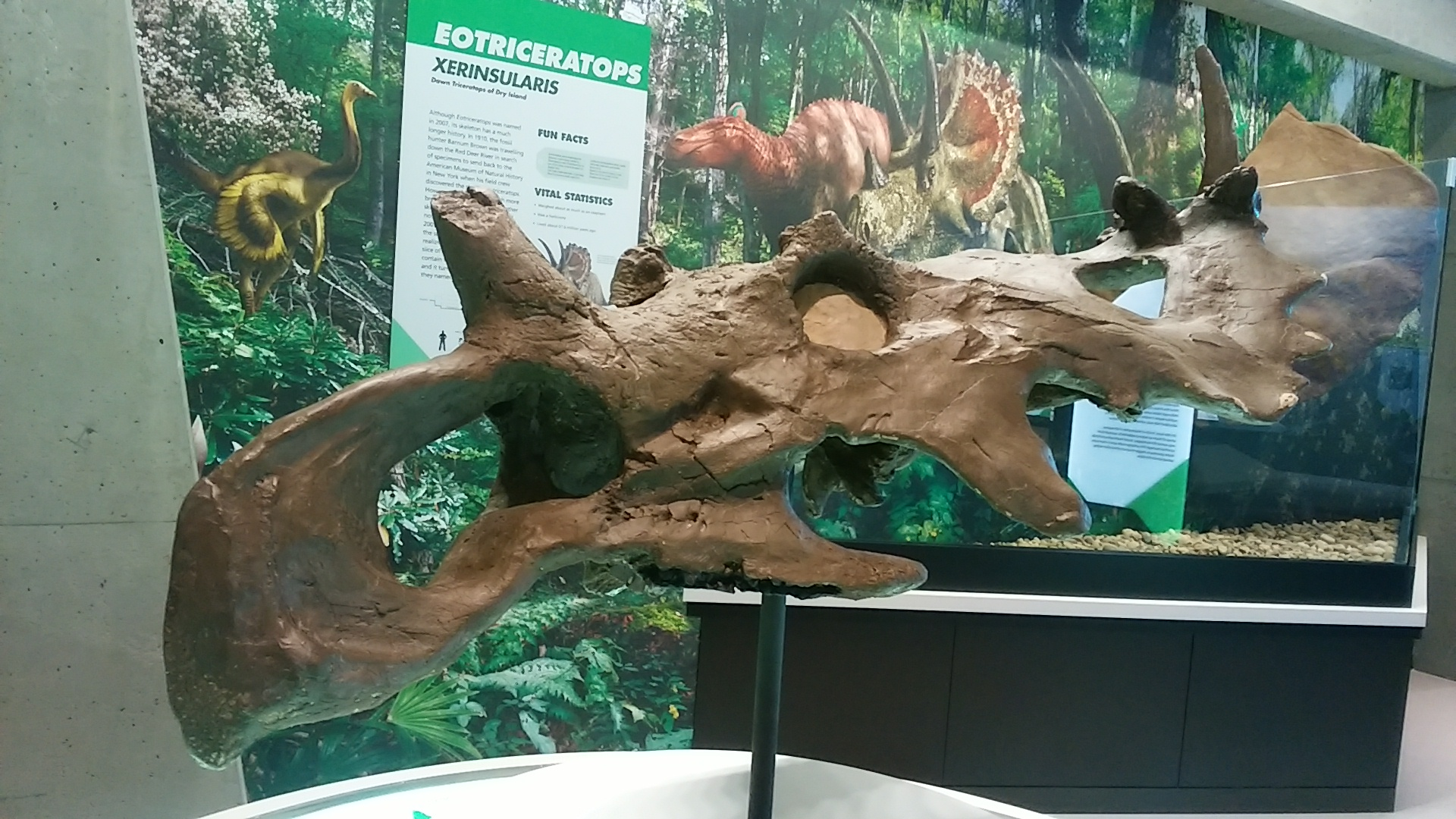
- Skull cast

Scientific classification
- Kingdom: Animalia
- Phylum: Chordata
- Class: Reptilia
- Clade: Dinosauria
- Clade: †Ornithischia
- Clade: †Ceratopsia
- Family: †Ceratopsidae
- Subfamily: †Centrosaurinae
- Tribe: †Centrosaurini
- Genus: †Coronosaurus; Ryan, Evans & Shepherd, 2012

Type species
- †Centrosaurus brinkmani (Ryan & Russell, 2005)

Synonyms
- Centrosaurus brinkmani Ryan & Russell, 2005

= Coronosaurus =

Coronosaurus Temporal range: Late Cretaceous, 77 Ma

Extinct genus of dinosaurs

Coronosaurus is a genus of centrosaurine ceratopsian dinosaurs which lived in the Late Cretaceous, in the middle Campanian stage. Its remains, two bone beds, were discovered by Phillip J. Currie in the Oldman Formation of Alberta, Canada, and its type and only species, Coronosaurus brinkmani, was first described in 2005, as a new species within the genus Centrosaurus. Later studies questioned the presence of a direct relationship, and in 2012 it was named as a separate genus. Coronosaurus means "crowned lizard", coming from "corona", Latin for crown, and "sauros", Greek for lizard; this name refers to the unique, crown-like shape of the horns on the top of its frill.

Like other ceratopsids, Coronosaurus had a large frill and horns on its head. These include a small pair of brow horns over its eyes, a large nasal horn on its snout, and, unique among ceratopsians, irregular, spiky bone masses on its frill. Growing up to around 5 metres (16 ft) long and 2 tonnes (2.0 long tons; 2.2 short tons) in weight, it was mid-sized for its kind. The genus is classified as a member of the Centrosaurini, a group of derived centrosaurines which has also been found include taxa such as Styracosaurus, Spinops, Rubeosaurus, and Centrosaurus, the genus it was originally placed within.

== Discovery and naming ==
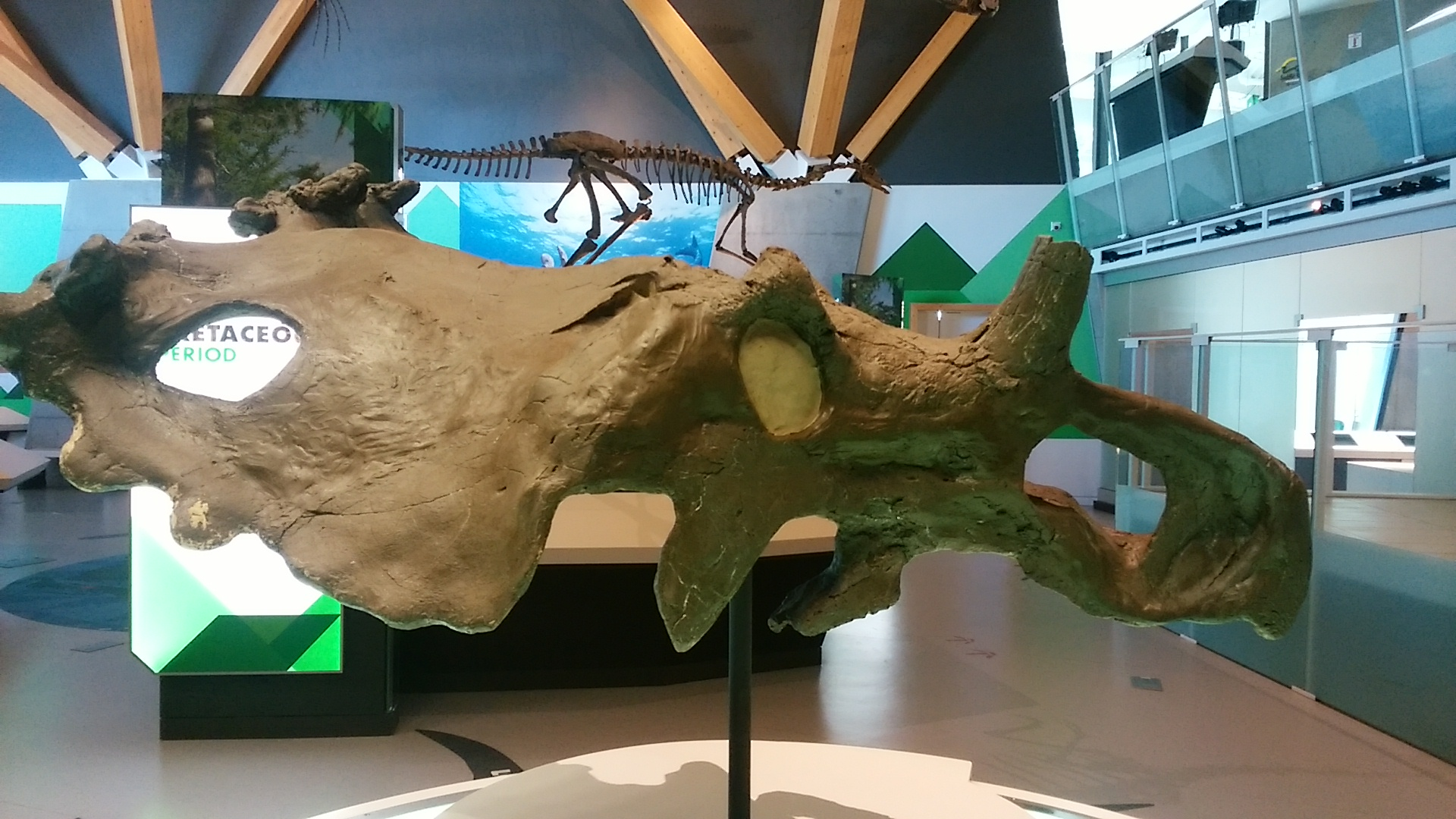
Left side view of skull cast

Coronosaurus is known from two bone beds, BB 138 and MRR BB, located in the upper unit of the Oldman Formation, of the Belly River Group, excavated by Philip Currie between 1996 and 2000. Most of the ceratopsid material, if not all, from BB 138 in Dinosaur Provincial Park, Alberta, and the MRR BB near Warner, Alberta, was referred to C. brinkmani. Bone bed 138 is located approximately fifty kilometres (31 miles) from Brooks, Alberta, in the Oldman Formation and 14.6 metres (48 ft) below the contact with the Dinosaur Park Formation. The MRR BB located approximately one hundred and eighty kilometres (110 miles) southwest of BB 138, is also from the Oldman Formation. These bone beds date to the middle Campanian stage of the Late Cretaceous period. Both the specimens and the precise localities are archived at the Royal Tyrrell Museum of Palaeontology, in Drumheller, Alberta.

Michael J. Ryan and Anthony P. Russell described and named the type species, then as Centrosaurus brinkmani, in 2005. Later studies, however, did not recover a monophyletic clade with the genus' type species Centrosaurus apertus in phylogenetic analyses. Due to this, Ryan, David C. Evans and Kieran M. Shepherd erected the genus Coronosaurus for the species in 2012. The generic name is derived from the Latin corona, meaning "crown" in reference to the multiple occurrences of extra epiparietals that cover the posterior margin of its parietal, giving it a crown-like appearance, and saurus (Latinized from Greek sauros), meaning "lizard". The specific name brinkmani honors Donald Brinkman, for his research in palaeoecology of the Late Cretaceous environments of Alberta. In 2020, in response to the COVID-19 pandemic, Ryan was asked about the naming of the dinosaur, and stated he came up with it because its frill ornamentation made him think of the corona of the sun. He also stated his fellow students at the time had jokingly called it ‘broccoli-ceratops’.

The holotype of Coronosaurus is TMP 2002.68.1. It is a large adult-sized parietal with an almost complete midline bar and a partial posterior bar with left P1–P3 processes and the partially eroded right P1-P2. The specimen lacks the extreme anterior margin of the midline bar that forms the posterior wall of the frontal fontanelle and the paper-thin lateral margins that define the medial margins of the supraorbital foramina. Other significant specimens according to Ryan & Russell (2005) include TMP 2002.68.3 (a parietal), TMP 2002.68.10 (a postorbital), and TMP 2002.68.5 (supraorbitals).

== Description ==
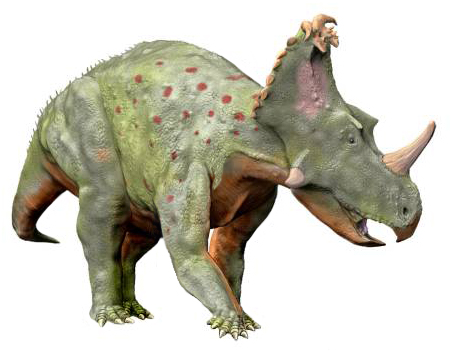
Life restoration

Coronosaurus is a medium-sized centrosaurine ceratopsid. Gregory S. Paul in 2010 estimated its body length at 5 metres (16 ft) and its weight at 2 tonnes (2.0 long tons; 2.2 short tons). It had as an adult inflated supraorbital horncores — the "brow horns" above the eye sockets — but not elongated as in Zuniceratops, chasmosaurines, and more basal centrosaurines (like Albertaceratops and Diabloceratops), that project laterally (to the sides) over the orbit. As a sub-adult its postorbital horncores are pyramidal in shape with a slight lateral inflection of the distal, upper, one half.

Uniquely among ceratopsians, Coronosaurus possesses a number of accessory epiparietal ossifications rear parietal frill of the skull that fuse to the posterior and dorsal frill surface. They develop through ontogeny, the growth of the individual, as short spines that may fuse along their adjacent margins into larger, irregular bone masses. They are located close to the midline of the frill in a closely packed bunch above the base of the first epiparietal (P1), the bone spur that at each side growths downwards over the large opening in each frill half. They contribute to the substance of P1 and, through fusion, form a composite epiparietal, that is equivalent to the second epiparietal (P2) normally formed in a more lateral position. The P1 bases can thus be considered the growth positions of the second epiparietals, the P2 loci. Coronosaurus has also a uniquely shaped P3 epiparietal. It is variably developed as a short tongue-like hook or tapered spike that is oriented dorsolaterally, following the curve of the frill.

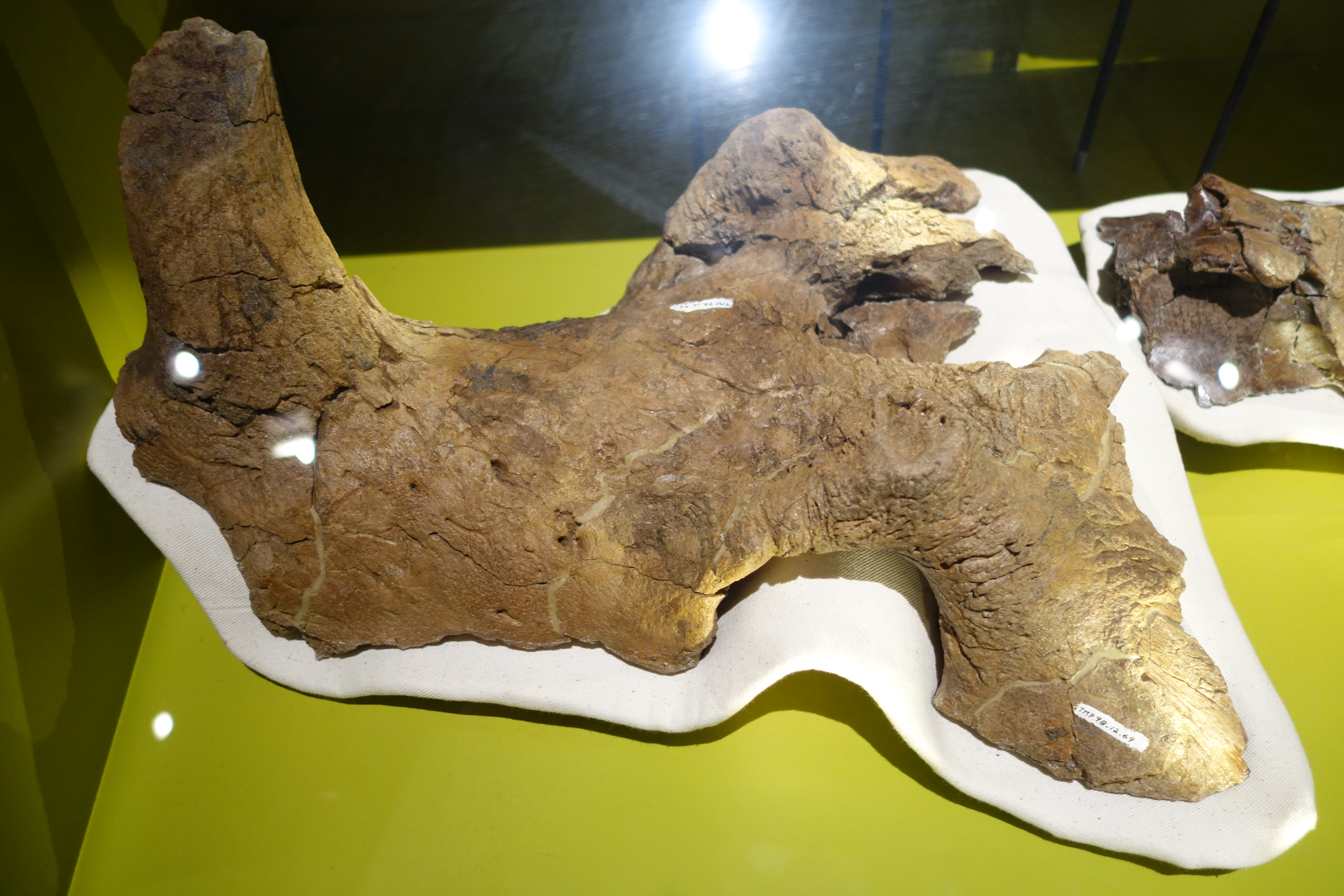
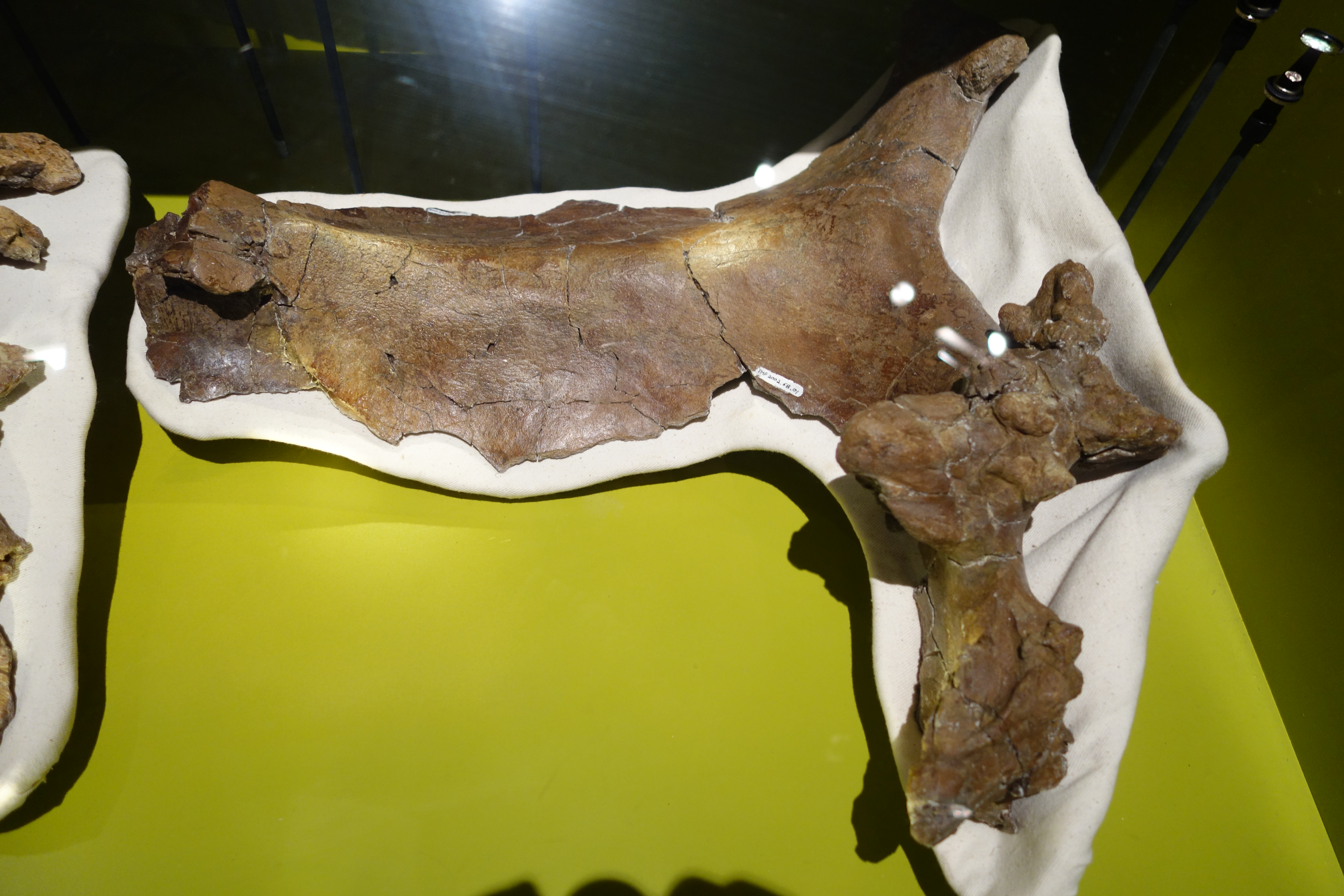
Partial skull, Royal Tyrrell Museum

Otherwise, as far as is known Coronosaurus resembles its relatives Centrosaurus and Styracosaurus in its morphology. For example, the nasal of Coronosaurus closely resembles that of Centrosaurus apertus in its unfused juvenile or subadult and fused adult forms and appears to have undergone a similar ontogenetic changes. Its erect, laterally compressed nasal horn core has a blunt tip that is formed from the fusion of the opposing nasals. It sits over the posterior portion of the external nares, as it does in all centrosaurines. All juvenile and most adult specimens have gently recurved anterior and posterior margins resulting in most horns having an apex that is oriented at least slightly caudally (backwards).

== Classification ==
In its original description, Ryan & Russell (2005) considered Coronosaurus to represent a new species of Centrosaurus on the basis of a small phylogenetic analysis. It included seventeen characters and nine taxa. Coronosaurus (as Centrosaurus brinkmani) and C. apertus grouped at the base of the Centrosaurinae, while Styracosaurus was found to be more closely related to Pachyrhinosaurus, and other derived centrosaurines, than to Centrosaurus. In 2011, Anthony R. Fiorillo and Ronald S. Tykoski modified the analysis of Currie et al. (2008), with 54 characters, to include more taxa, such as C. brinkmani. They found C. brinkmani to be the sister taxon of the clade of Styracosaurus and C. apertus, while Pachyrhinosaurus and other derived centrosaurines were in a separate lineage. Thus, this analysis found no support for the monophyly of Centrosaurus.

Later, Farke et al. (2011) used 97 morphological characters to assess the phylogenetic position of a new taxon which they named Spinops. Spinops was found to be in a polytomy with Centrosaurus apertus, C. brinkmani and Styracosaurus, and therefore C. brinkmani was excluded from the analysis to increase the resolution. Finally, Ryan, Evans & Shepherd (2012) used the data matrix of Farke et al. (2011) to assess the phylogenetic position of Xenoceratops. Their revised analysis had significantly better resolution than that presented by Farke et al. (2011), due in part to the additional scoring of missing characters for some taxa based on direct observation of their specimens. For example, five additional characters were scored for C. brinkmani. In the resultant tree, it was found to be in more advanced position than Spinops and C. apertus, as the sister taxon of Styracosaurus. Thus the new generic name, Coronosaurus, was given to it. The cladogram presented below follows a phylogenetic analysis by Chiba et al. (2017):

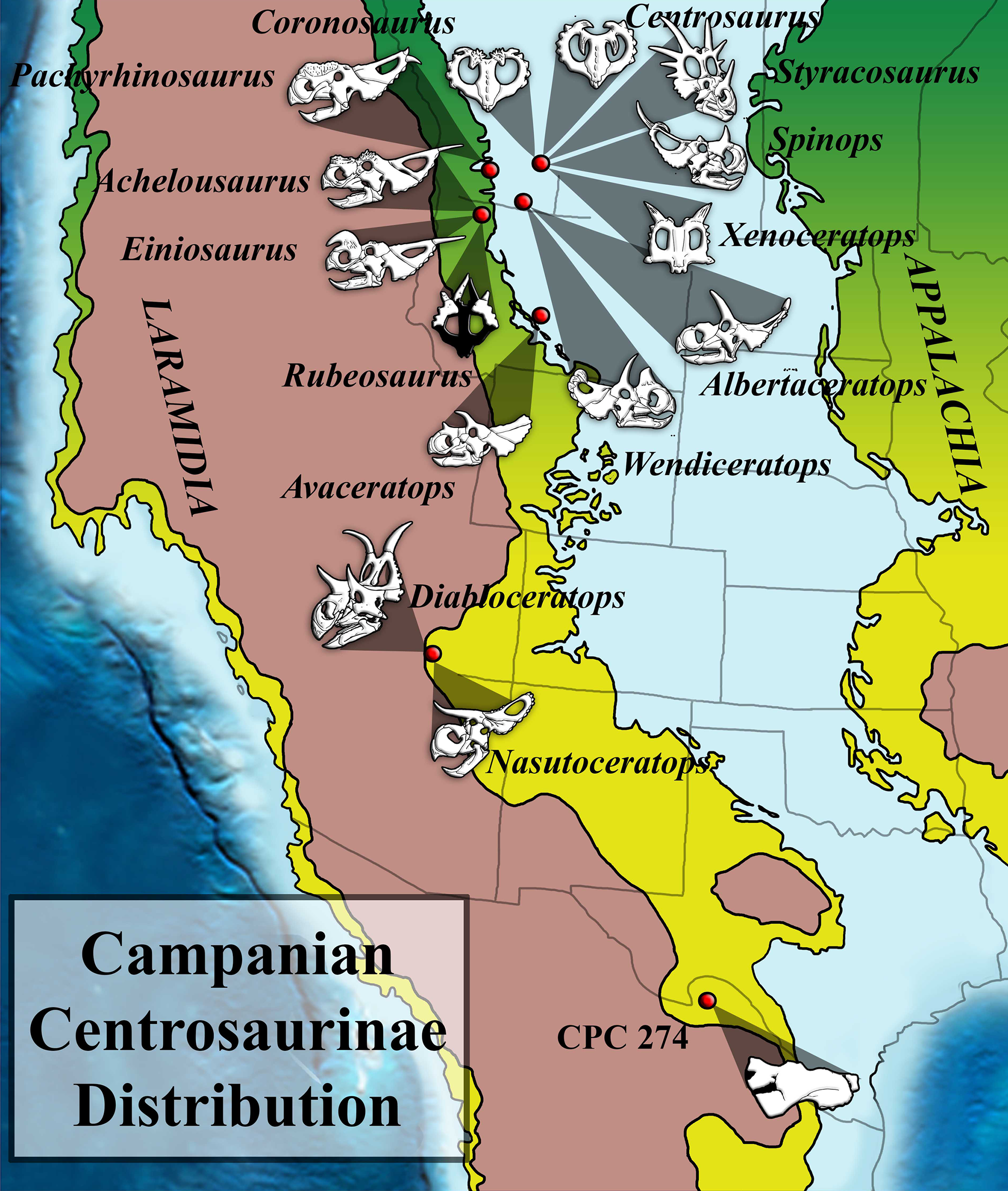
Biogeography of centrosaurine dinosaurs during the Campanian

- Centrosaurinae
  - - Diabloceratops eatoni
    - Machairoceratops cronusi
  - - Nasutoceratopsini
      - Avaceratops lammersi (ANSP 15800)
      - MOR 692
      - CMN 8804
      - Nasutoceratops titusi
      - Malta new taxon
    - - Xenoceratops foremostensis
      - - - Sinoceratops zhuchengensis
          - Wendiceratops pinhornensis
        - Albertaceratops nesmoi
        - Medusaceratops lokii
        - Eucentrosaura
          - Centrosaurini
            - - Rubeosaurus ovatus
              - Styracosaurus albertensis
            - - Coronosaurus brinkmani
              - - Centrosaurus apertus
                - Spinops sternbergorum
          - Pachyrhinosaurini
            - Einiosaurus procurvicornis
            - Pachyrostra
              - Achelousaurus horneri
              - - Pachyrhinosaurus canadensis
                - - Pachyrhinosaurus lakustai
                  - Pachyrhinosaurus perotorum

== Paleoecology ==
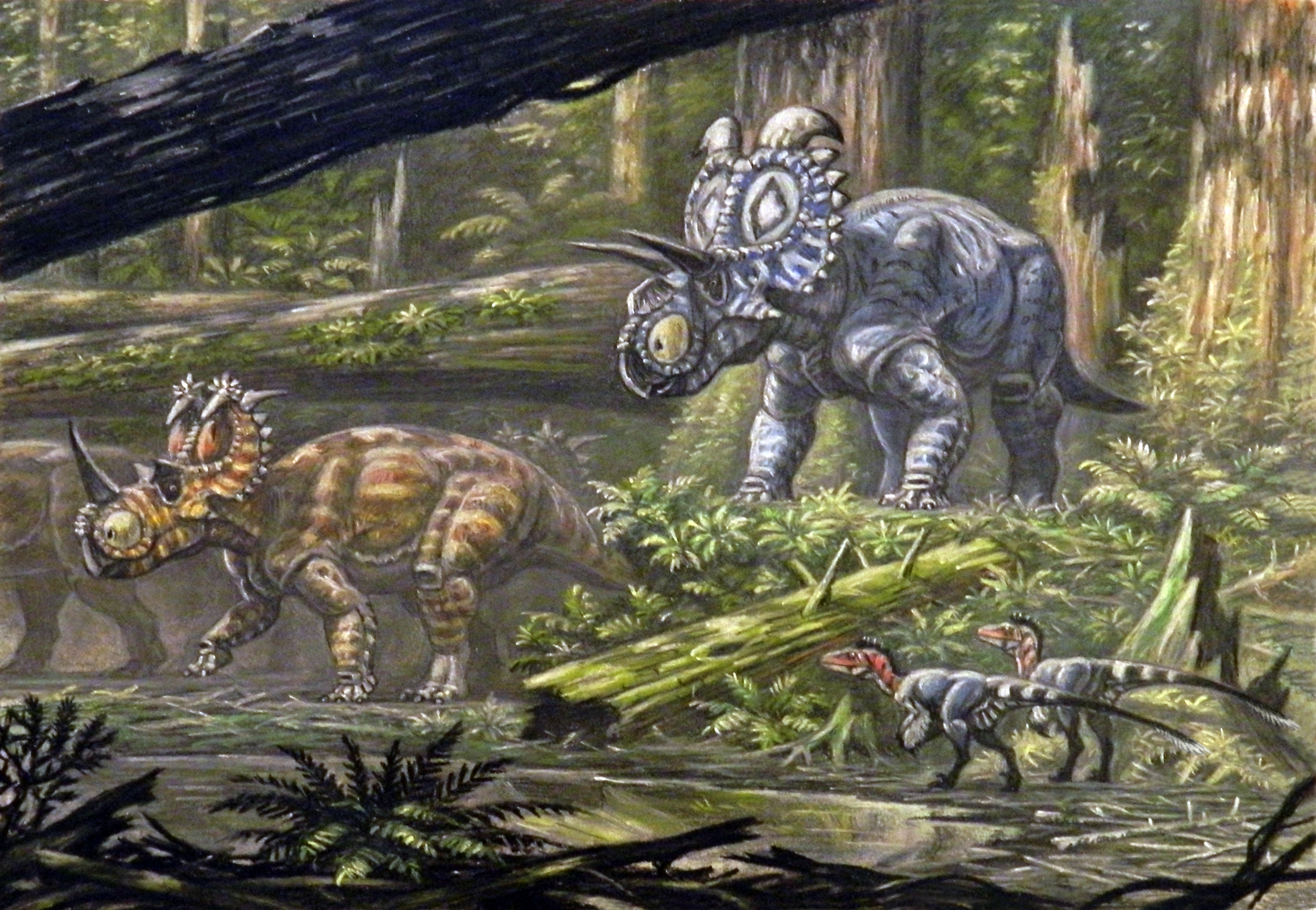
Coronosaurus and Albertaceratops in environment

Studies suggest that the paleoenvironment of the Oldman Formation was an ancient coastal plain. In addition to remains of Coronosaurus, this formation has produced the remains of the theropods Saurornitholestes, Daspletosaurus, Troodon, Dromaeosaurus and Hesperonychus, the ceratopsids Albertaceratops, Chasmosaurus, and Anchiceratops, the hadrosaurids Brachylophosaurus, Gryposaurus, Parasaurolophus, and Corythosaurus, the thescelosaurid Albertadromeus and the ankylosaurid Scolosaurus.

== See also ==
- Timeline of ceratopsian research
