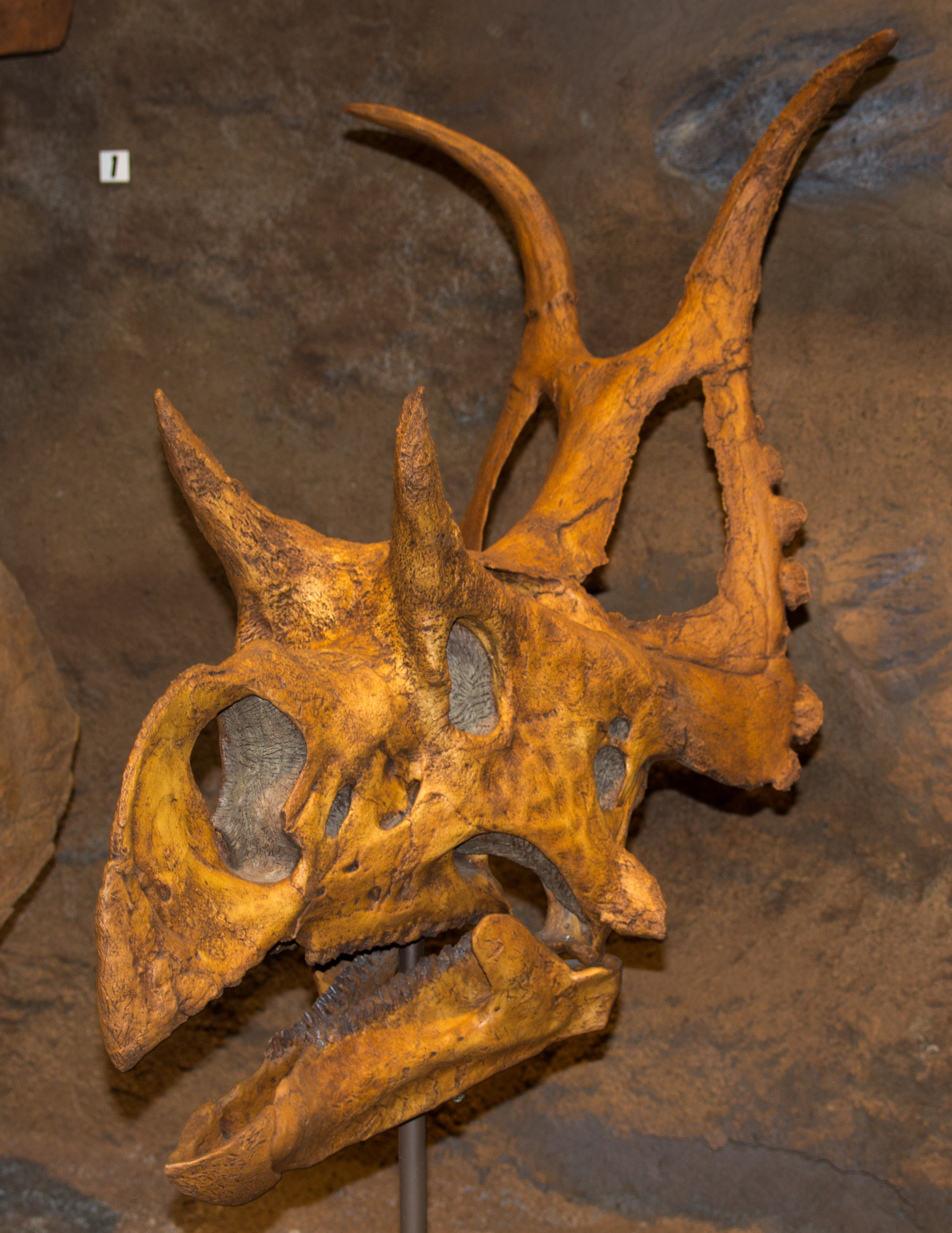
- Restored skull

Scientific classification
- Kingdom: Animalia
- Phylum: Chordata
- Class: Reptilia
- Clade: Dinosauria
- Clade: †Ornithischia
- Clade: †Ceratopsia
- Family: †Ceratopsidae
- Subfamily: †Centrosaurinae
- Genus: †Diabloceratops; Kirkland and DeBlieux, 2010
- Species: †D. eatoni

Binomial name
- †Diabloceratops eatoni Kirkland and DeBlieux, 2010

= Diabloceratops =

Diabloceratops Temporal range: Late Cretaceous, 81.4–81 Ma

Extinct genus of dinosaurs

Diabloceratops (/daɪˌæbloʊˈsɛrətɒps/ dy-AB-loh-SERR-ə-tops) is an extinct genus of centrosaurine ceratopsian dinosaur that lived approximately 81.4-81 million years ago (Ma) during the latter part of the Cretaceous Period in what is now Utah, in the United States. Diabloceratops was a medium-sized, moderately built, ground-dwelling, quadrupedal herbivore, that could grow up to an estimated 4.5 metres (15 ft) in length and 1.3 metric tons (1.4 short tons) in body mass. At the time of its discovery, it was the oldest-known ceratopsid, and first centrosaurine known from latitudes south of the U.S. state of Montana. The generic name Diabloceratops means "devil-horned face", coming from Diablo, Spanish for "devil", and ceratops, Latinized Greek for "horned face". The specific name honors Jeffrey Eaton, a paleontologist at Weber State University and long time friend of the lead author Jim Kirkland. Eaton had a big role in establishing the Grand Staircase-Escalante National Monument where the specimen was found. The type species, Diabloceratops eatoni, was named and described in 2010 by James Ian Kirkland and Donald DeBlieux.

== Discovery ==
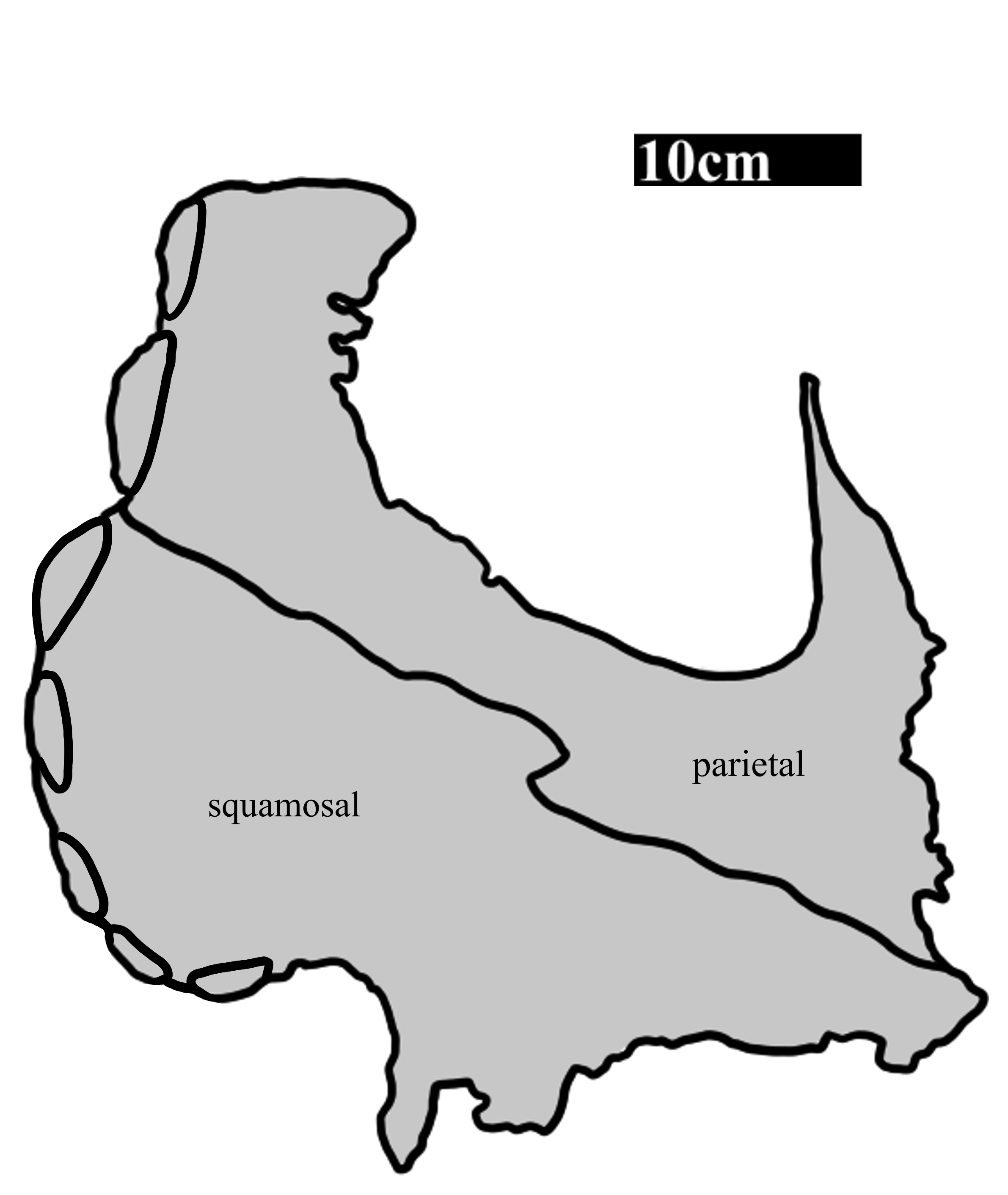
Preserved fossil material of specimen UMNH VP 16704

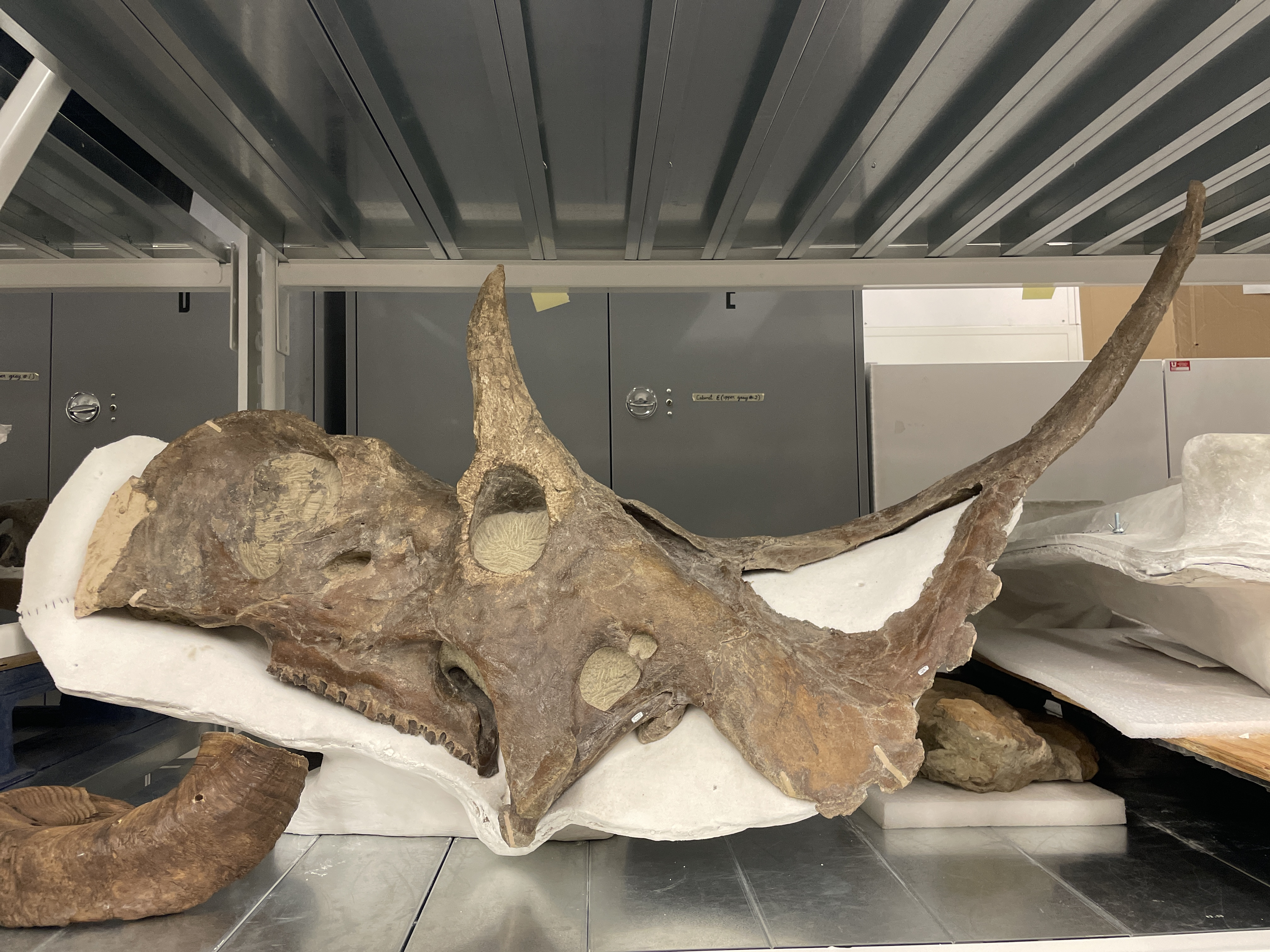
Holotype skull of Diabloceratops

The only specimen of Diabloceratops eatoni was recovered at the Last Chance Creek Member of the Wahweap Formation, in Kane County, Utah. Type specimen UMNH VP 16699 was collected by Don DeBlieux in 2002, at the Last Chance Creek locality of this formation, in intraclastic sandstone that was deposited during the Campanian stage of the Cretaceous period. The stratigraphic level of which it was found has been estimated to be 81.27 Ma, with an error range between 81.42 and 81.01 Ma. It consists of a partial skull with a piece of the lower jaw, with the right side being intact and part of the left side, which has been weathered. Another specimen, UMNH VP 16704, was discovered years earlier in 1998 by Joshua A. Smith of the same formation, but was not described until 2010, when it was assigned to Diabloceratops. However, this specimen may not belong to Diabloceratops, because it shares features found only in more derived centrosaurines. Some researchers suggest that the UMNH VP 16704 specimen is more similar to Machairoceratops, Yehuecauhceratops and Menefeeceratops than to Diabloceratops due to the fan-shaped shape end of the squamosal. These specimens are housed in the collection of the Natural History Museum of Utah.

== Description ==
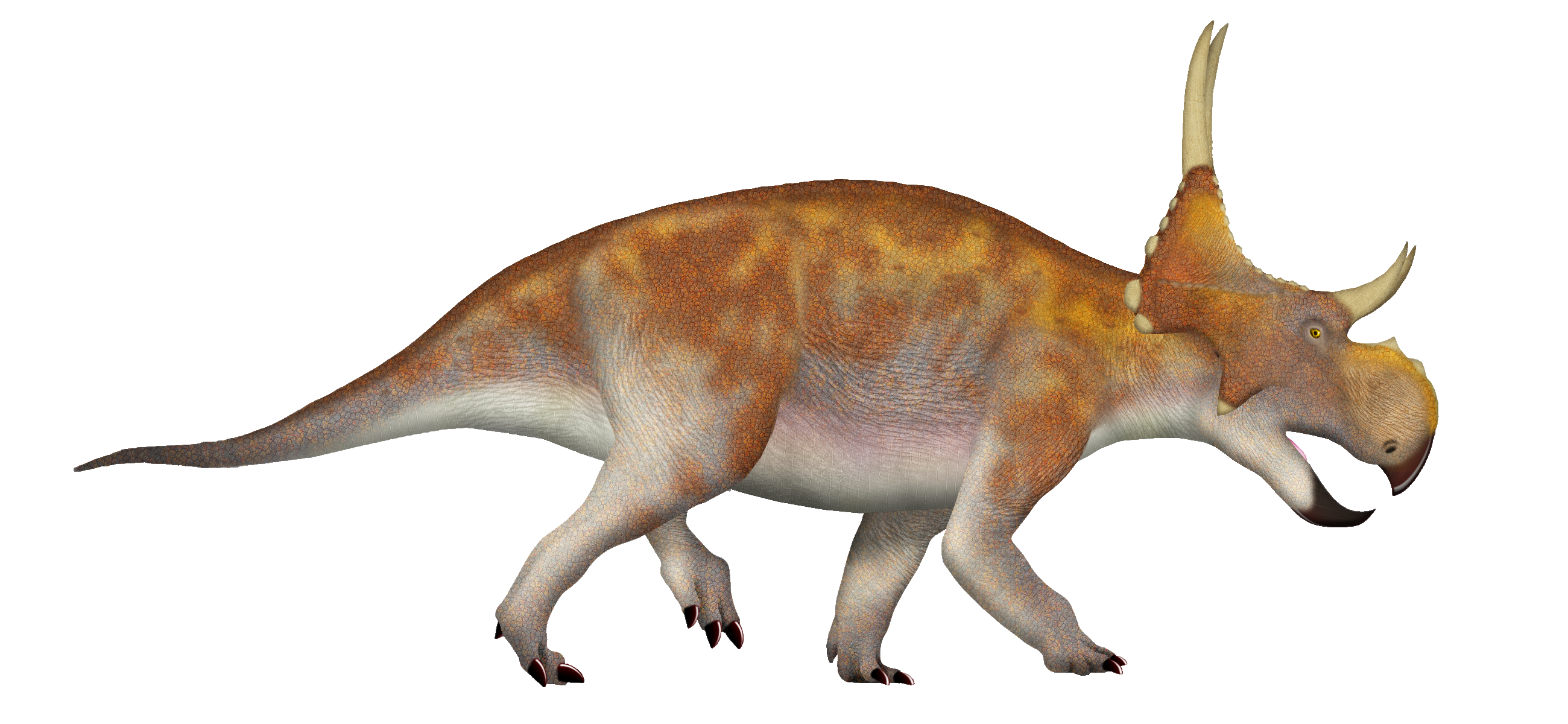
Life restoration

Diabloceratops was a medium-sized ceratopsian, growing up to 4.5 metres (15 ft) in length and 1.3 metric tons (1.4 short tons) in body mass. It was built like a typical ceratopsian in that it had a large neck frill made of bone. It had a small horn on the nose, perhaps a second horn in front of that, and a pair of relatively small horns above the eyes. The skull is deeper and shorter than that of any other centrosaurines.

Upon the frill it also had a pair of very long spikes as in Einiosaurus and Styracosaurus. It being one of the earliest centrosaurine ceratopsids, Kirkland noted a character Diabloceratops shared with the more "primitive" protoceratopsid forms. Both possess an accessory opening in the skull that would become much reduced or disappear in later, more advanced ceratopsids. Kirkland and DeBlieux saw this as an indication that the earlier species were not together included in some single natural group but instead presented a gradual sequence of ever more derived forms, increasingly closer related to the Ceratopsidae.

== Classification ==
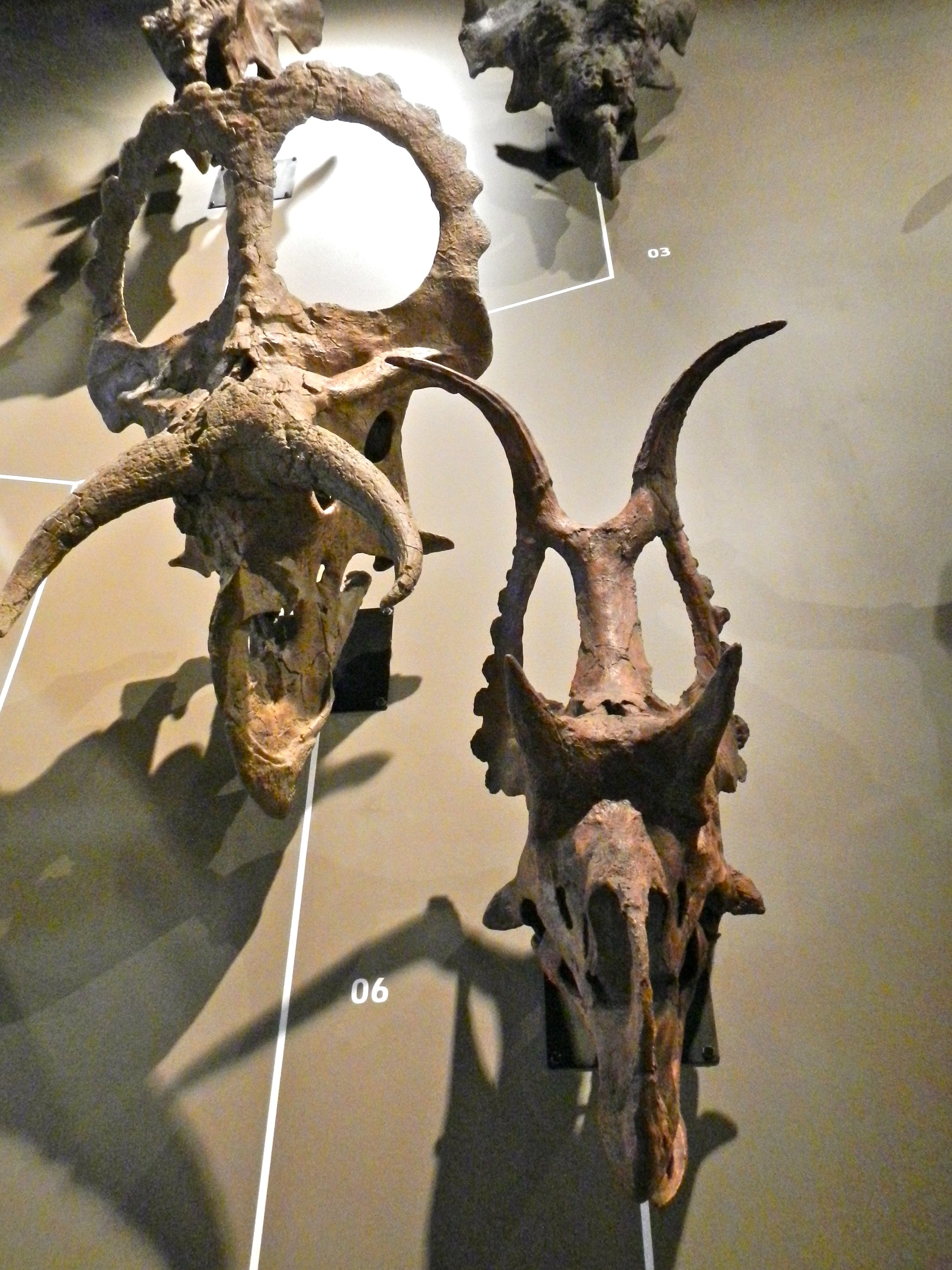
Restored skulls of Nasutoceratops (left) and Diabloceratops, Natural History Museum of Utah

A phylogenetic tree after a recent phylogenetic analysis by Chiba et al. (2017):

- Centrosaurinae
  - - Diabloceratops eatoni
    - Machairoceratops cronusi
  - - Nasutoceratopsini
      - Avaceratops lammersi (ANSP 15800)
      - MOR 692
      - CMN 8804
      - Nasutoceratops titusi
      - Malta new taxon
    - - Xenoceratops foremostensis
      - - - Sinoceratops zhuchengensis
          - Wendiceratops pinhornensis
        - Albertaceratops nesmoi
        - Medusaceratops lokii
        - Eucentrosaura
          - Centrosaurini
            - - Rubeosaurus ovatus
              - Styracosaurus albertensis
            - - Coronosaurus brinkmani
              - - Centrosaurus apertus
                - Spinops sternbergorum
          - Pachyrhinosaurini
            - Einiosaurus procurvicornis
            - Pachyrostra
              - Achelousaurus horneri
              - - Pachyrhinosaurus canadensis
                - - Pachyrhinosaurus lakustai
                  - Pachyrhinosaurus perotorum

A 2019 phylogenetic analysis recovered this genus is a sister taxon of the ceratopsid family, but as a ceratopsian outside the group. Subsequent studies still consider this genus as a basal centrosaurine based on phylogenetic analyses.

== Paleoecology ==
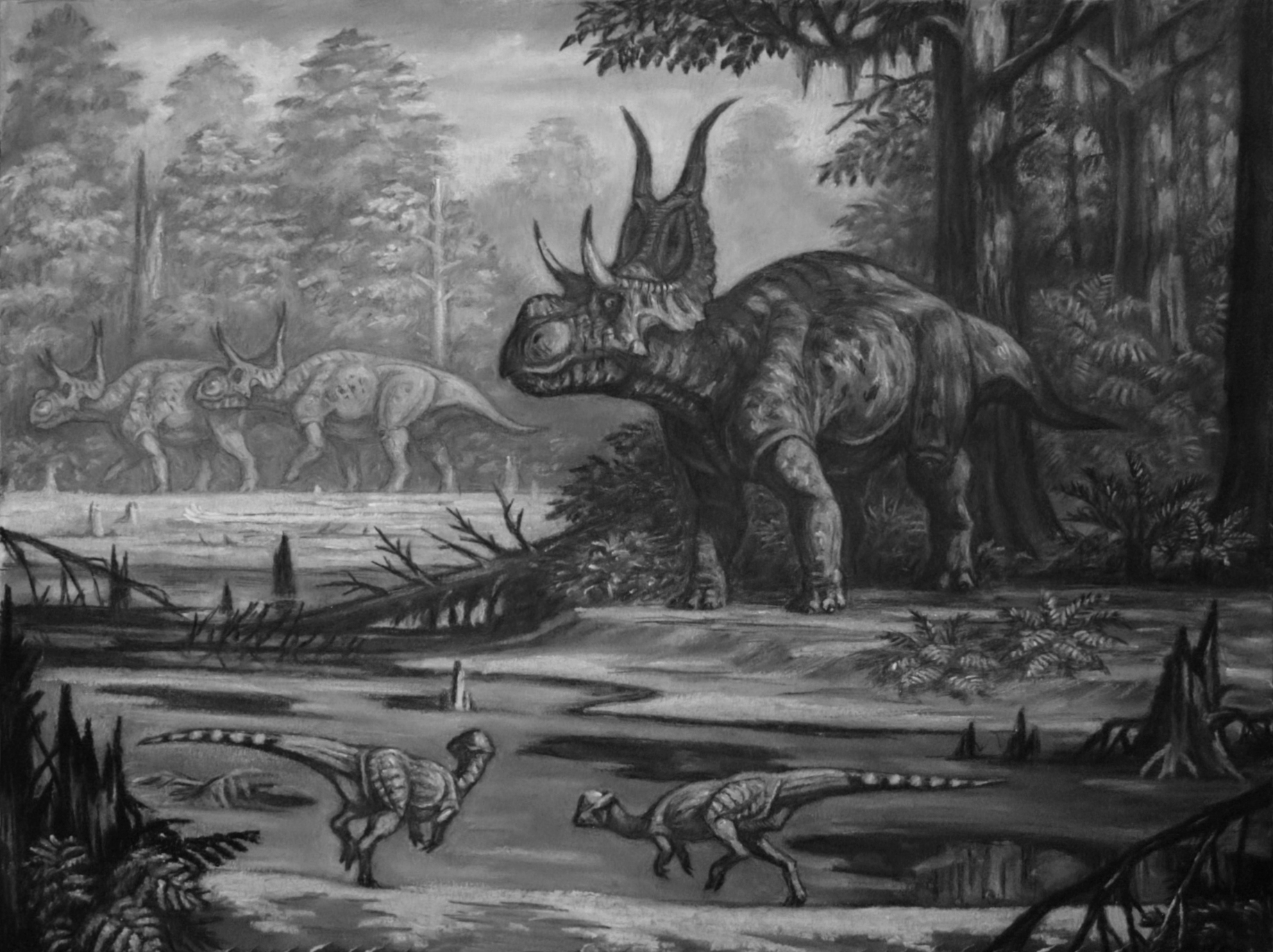
Diabloceratops in environment

=== Habitat ===
The Wahweap Formation has been radiometrically dated as being between 82.2 and 77.3 million years old. The precise age of Diabloceratops has been estimated to be 81.27 Ma, with a range of uncertainty between 81.42-81.01 Ma. During the time that Diabloceratops lived, the Western Interior Seaway was at its widest extent, almost completely isolating southern Laramidia from the rest of North America. The area where dinosaurs lived included lakes, floodplains, and east-flowing rivers. The Wahweap Formation is part of the Grand Staircase region, an immense sequence of sedimentary rock layers that stretch south from Bryce Canyon National Park through Zion National Park and into the Grand Canyon. The presence of rapid sedimentation and other evidence suggests a wet, seasonal climate.

=== Paleofauna ===
Diabloceratops shared its paleoenvironment with other dinosaurs, such as the hadrosaur Acristavus gagslarsoni, and the lambeosaur Adelolophus hutchisoni, unnamed ankylosaurs and pachycephalosaurs, and the theropod Lythronax argestes, which was likely the apex predator in its ecosystem. Vertebrates present in the Wahweap Formation at the time of Diabloceratops included freshwater fish, bowfins, abundant rays and sharks, turtles like Compsemys, crocodilians, and lungfish. A fair number of mammals lived in this region, which included several genera of multituberculates, cladotherians, marsupials, and placental insectivores. The mammals are more primitive than those that lived in the area that is now the Kaiparowits Formation. Trace fossils are relatively abundant in the Wahweap Formation, and suggest the presence of crocodylomorphs, as well as ornithischian and theropod dinosaurs. In 2010 a unique trace fossil was discovered that suggests a predator-prey relationship between dinosaurs and primitive mammals. The trace fossil includes at least two fossilized mammalian den complexes as well as associated digging grooves presumably caused by a maniraptoran dinosaur. The proximity indicates a case of probable active predation of the burrow inhabitants by the animals that made the claw marks. Invertebrate activity in this formation ranged from fossilized insect burrows in petrified logs to various mollusks, large crabs, and a wide diversity of gastropods and ostracods.

== See also ==
- Timeline of ceratopsian research
