= Wendy Sloboda =

Canadian fossil hunter

- Born: 1968 (age c. 58)
- Education: University of Lethbridge
- Occupation: Fossil collector
- Years active: 1987–present
- Known for: Fossil discoveries

Wendy J. Sloboda (born 1968) is a Canadian fossil hunter from Warner, Alberta. She has made fossil discoveries of dinosaurs and other extinct animals on several continents, with finds in Canada, Argentina, Mongolia, France, and Greenland. She is commemorated in name of the horned dinosaur Wendiceratops, remains of which she discovered in 2010, as well as the fossil footprint Barrosopus slobodai which she discovered in 2003.

== Biography ==
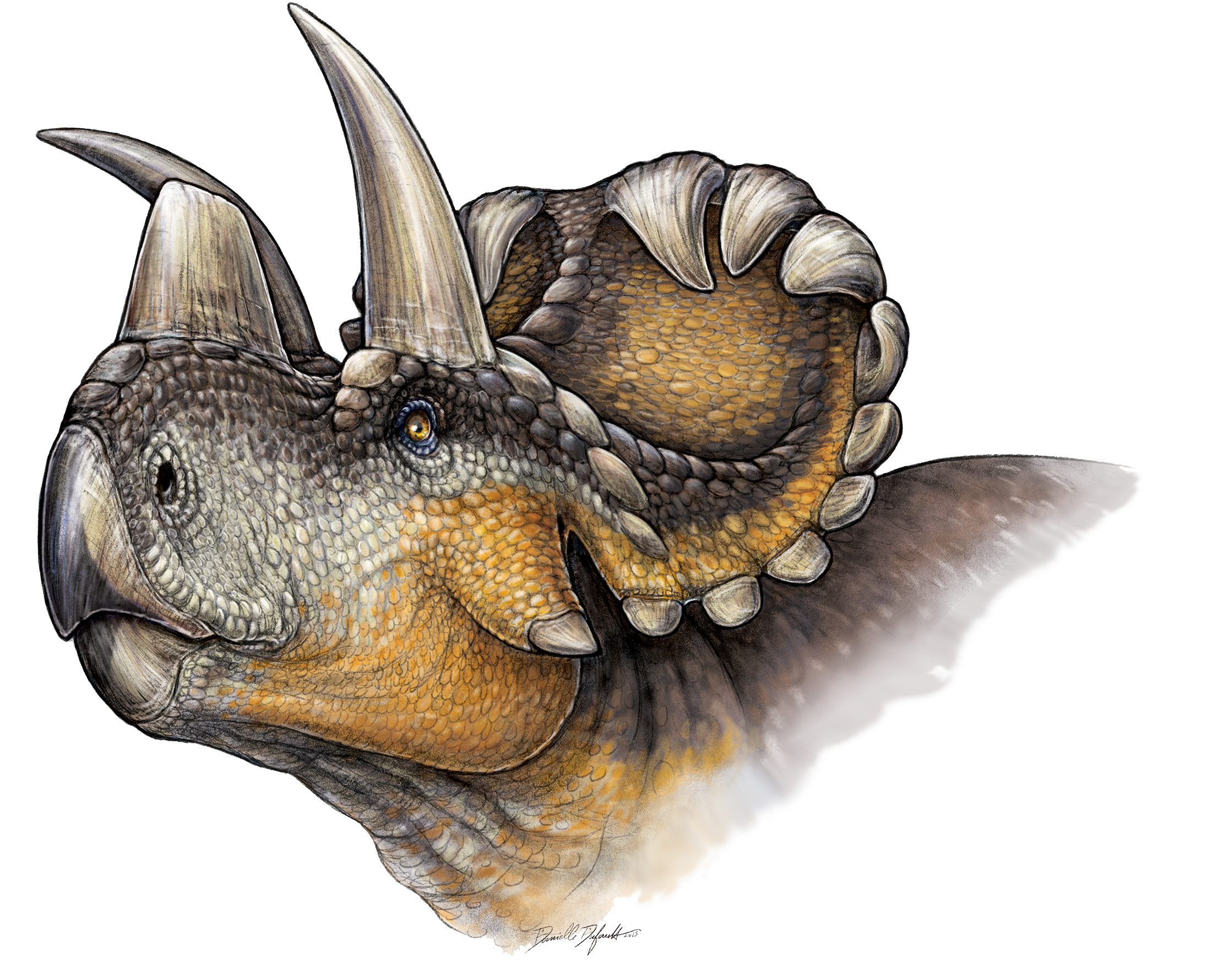
Illustration of Wendiceratops, which Sloboda discovered in 2010

In 1987, as a teenager, Sloboda discovered fossil eggshells in southern Alberta which she passed on to scientists, who uncovered multiple nests of hadrosaurs (duck-billed dinosaurs) including fossilized embryos. She enrolled at the University of Lethbridge in 1989 and in the summer of 1990, discovered a hadrosaur skeleton. She worked for 16 years as a paleontological technician at the Royal Tyrrell Museum and started her own business, Mesozoic Wrex Repair, a fossil preparation and casting company, in 2001. She earned B.A. in history from the University of Lethbridge in 2001.

Paleontologist David Evans, of the Royal Ontario Museum calls Sloboda "basically a legend in Alberta. She's probably one of the best dinosaur hunters in the world." Her discoveries include the first pterosaur bonebed in North America, and a pterosaur leg showing evidence of predation by a small dinosaur that inspired author Daniel Loxton's 2013 book Pterosaur Trouble.

Sloboda has made numerous discoveries in Alberta's Dinosaur Provincial Park, including fossil skulls of Corythosaurus, ankylosaurs (including Euoplocephalus) and crocodilians. In 1999, she discovered and prepared the first known fossils of a gravid (egg-containing) turtle. In 2005, along with paleontologist Darla Zelenitsky, she described the oogenus Reticuloolithus: fossilized eggshells found in Alberta and Montana, believed to have been laid by maniraptoran dinosaurs such as oviraptorosaurs or dromaeosaurids.

In 2003, while working in South America, Sloboda discovered a fossil footprint in Plaza Huincul, Argentina. The footprint was described as a new ichnospecies by paleontologists Rodolfo Coria, Philip Currie, Alberto Garrido, and David Eberth, who honored Sloboda by naming it Barrosopus slobodai, which translates as "Sloboda's muddy foot".

In 2010, Sloboda discovered a rock containing a bone fragment in Southern Alberta, between the Milk River and the Canada-US border. Evans and Ryan described the remains as a new genus and species, dubbed Wendiceratops pinhornensis, with the genus name combining Sloboda's first name with the suffix "-ceratops", common in horned dinosaur names. In celebration of having a genus named after her, Sloboda had a drawing of the dinosaur and its scientific name tattooed on her arm.

== Publications ==
- Chin, K.; Eberth, D. A.; Schweitzer, M. H.; Rando, T. A.; Sloboda, W. J.; Horner, J. R. (2003). "Remarkable preservation of undigested muscle tissue within a Late Cretaceous tyrannosaurid coprolite from Alberta, Canada". PALAIOS. 18 (3): 286–294. Bibcode:2003Palai..18..286C. doi:10.1669/0883-1351(2003)018<0286:rpoumt>2.0.co;2. JSTOR 3515739. PMID 12866547. S2CID 9681069.
- Zelenitsky, Darla K.; Sloboda, Wendy J. (2005). "Eggshells". In Philip J. Currie; Eva Bundgaard Koppelhus (eds.). Dinosaur Provincial Park: A Spectacular Ancient Ecosystem Revealed. Indiana University Press. pp. 398–404. ISBN 0-253-34595-2.
