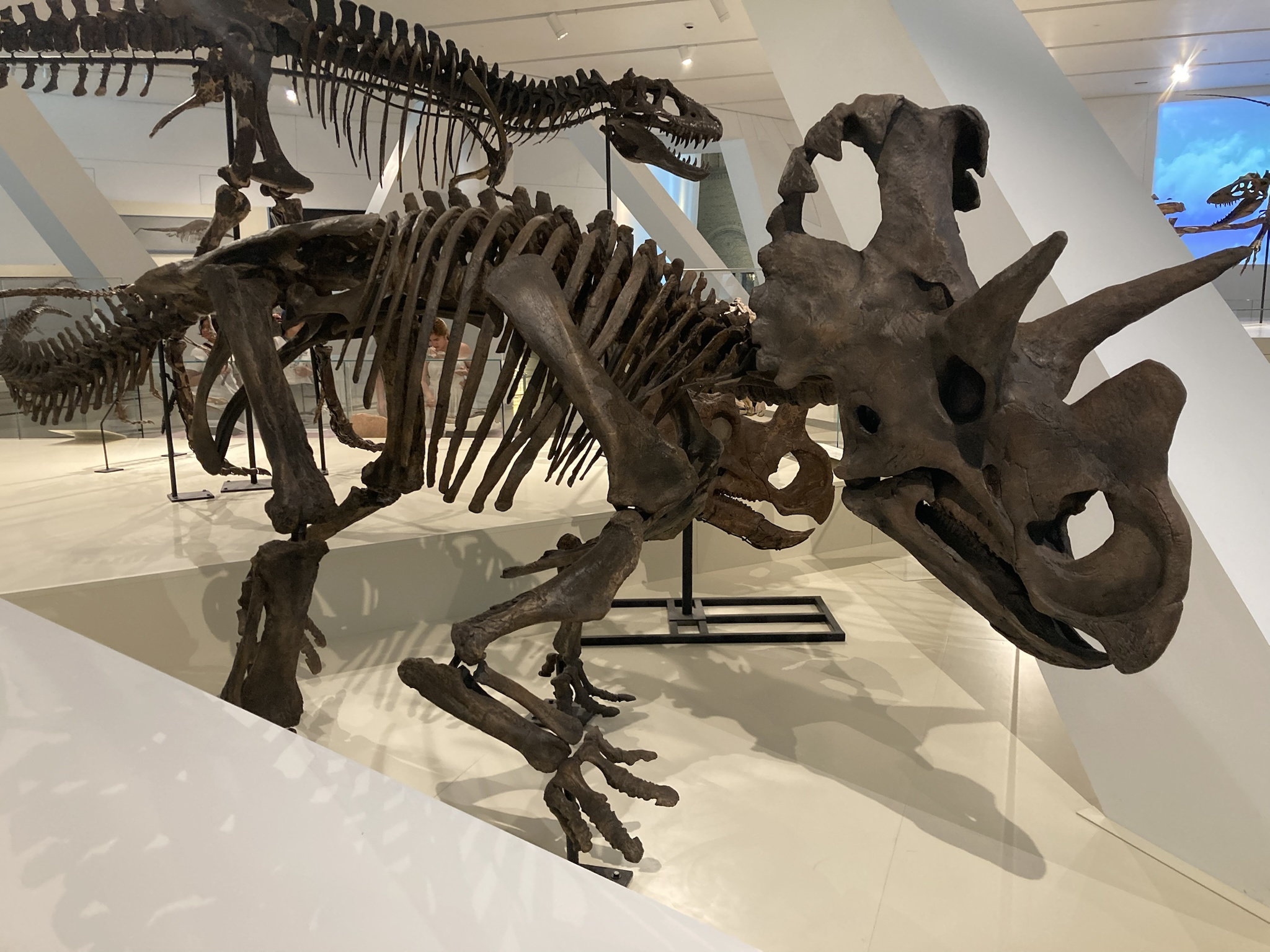
- Mounted skeleton at Royal Ontario Museum

Scientific classification
- Kingdom: Animalia
- Phylum: Chordata
- Class: Reptilia
- Clade: Dinosauria
- Clade: †Ornithischia
- Clade: †Ceratopsia
- Family: †Ceratopsidae
- Subfamily: †Centrosaurinae
- Genus: †Wendiceratops; Evans & Ryan, 2015
- Species: †W. pinhornensis

Binomial name
- †Wendiceratops pinhornensis Evans & Ryan, 2015

= Wendiceratops =

Wendiceratops Temporal range: Late Cretaceous, 79–78.7 Ma

Extinct genus of dinosaurs

Wendiceratops is a genus of herbivorous centrosaurine ceratopsian dinosaur from the Late Cretaceous of Canada. The type species of Wendiceratops is Wendiceratops pinhornensis. Its fossils were discovered in 2010 by fossil prospector Wendy Sloboda at the Pinhorn Provincial Grazing Reserve in southern Alberta, Canada, and excavations were carried out from 2011 to 2014. The generic name combines Sloboda's name, in recognition of her discovery of the fossil site, with the Greek words meaning "horned face", while the specific name refers to the region where the fossils were discovered.

Living approximately 79 million years ago, during the middle Campanian stage of the Late Cretaceous, Wendiceratops was one of the early centrosaurine dinosaurs and represents an important fossil for understanding ceratopsian diversity and the evolution of cranial ornamentation during that period. More than 200 fossil specimens have been recovered, including various parts of the skull, with bones from multiple individuals found at a single site. This bonebed is regarded as the oldest evidence of a group of ceratopsians that may have lived together in herds.

== Discovery ==
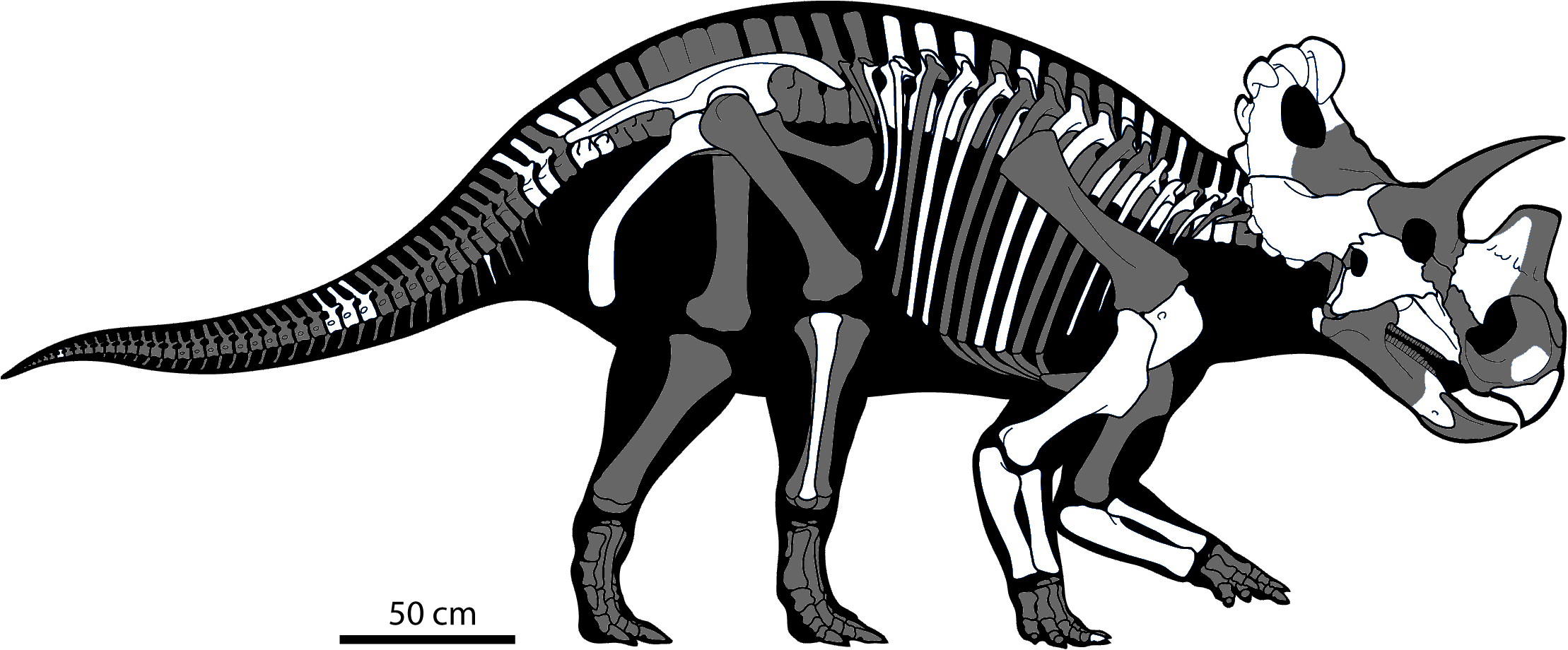
Skeletal reconstruction showing known remains in white

In 2010, Canadian fossil hunter Wendy Sloboda found a centrosaurine bonebed in the Pinhorn Provincial Grazing Reserve south of the Milk River, County of Forty Mile No. 8, Alberta. In 2011, a team of the Royal Tyrrell Museum explored the site and began excavating fossils. Next year, a deep overburden was removed. In 2013 and 2014, numerous fossils were discovered.

In 2015, paleontologists David Evans and Michael Ryan named and described the type species Wendiceratops pinhornensis. The generic name combines a reference to Wendy Sloboda with a Latinised Greek ~ceratops, "horn face". The specific name refers to the provenance from the Pinhorn Reserve. Wendiceratops was the second ceratopsian discovered and named in 2015. The discovery of this new horned dinosaur species - starting from the ground in Alberta, through scientific study and restoration, all the way to its eventual reconstruction and public display in The Royal Ontario Museum (ROM) - was captured in the HISTORY series and companion website Dino Hunt Canada.

The holotype, TMP 2011.051.0009, was found in a layer of the Oldman Formation, dating from the Campanian. The layer of mudstone, 40 centimetres (1.3 ft) thick and probably deposited in a single event, has an upper possible age of 79 million years and a lower age of 78.7 million years. The holotype consists of a right parietal bone. Under the assumption that the bonebed contained only a single centrosaurine species, all additional centrosaurine material was referred to Wendiceratops pinhornensis, for a total of 184 specimens representing several individuals, including juveniles. The bones comprise elements from the skull, lower jaws, vertebral column, shoulder girdle, pelvis and limbs. They are largely disarticulated. In addition to the Wendiceratops bones, remains were found of tyrannosaurid theropods, crocodiles, gars and plants.

== Description ==
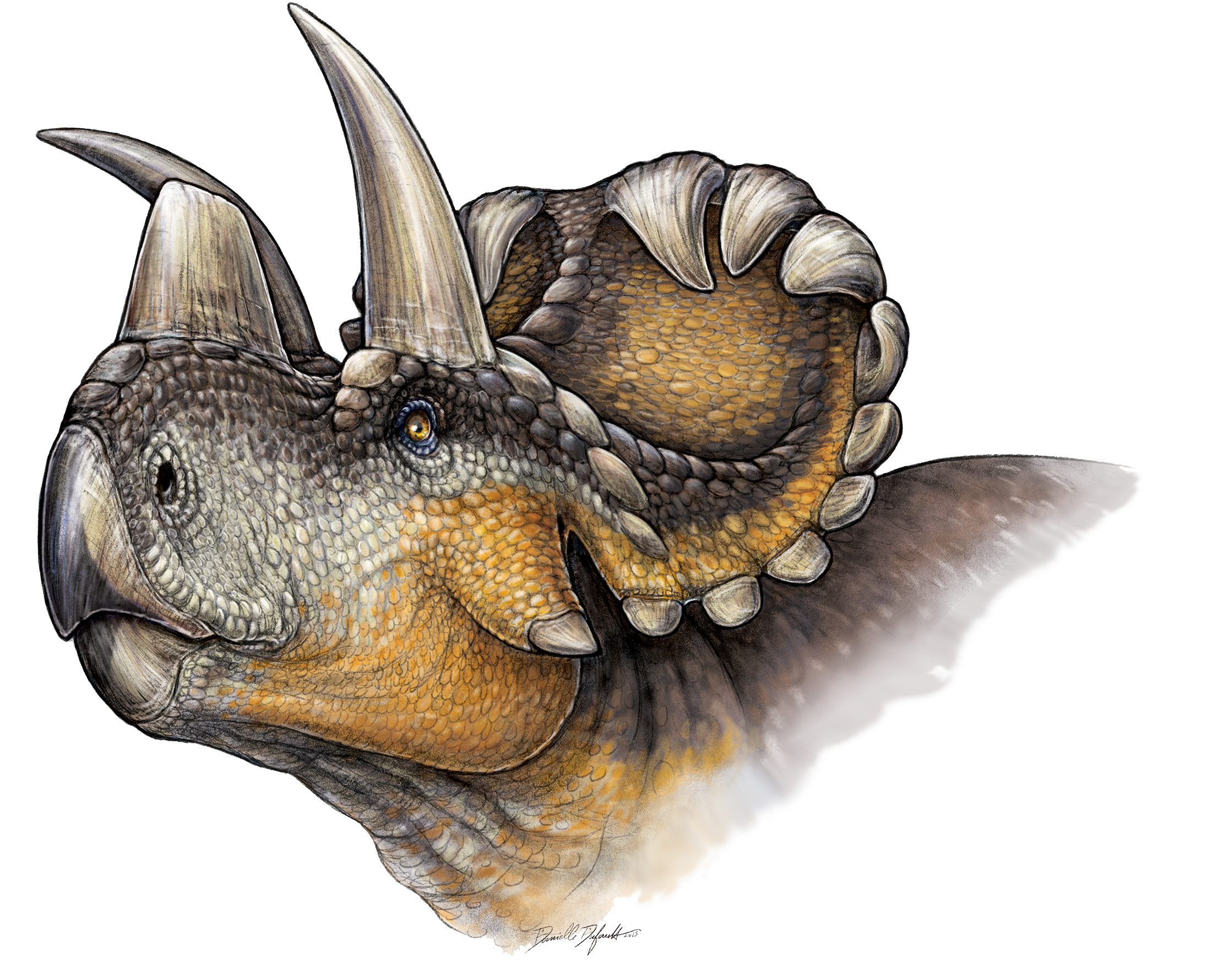
Life restoration

=== Size and distinguishing traits ===
Wendiceratops reached 6 metres (20 ft) in length and 1.5 metric tons (1.7 short tons) in body mass.

The describing authors indicated two unique traits, or autapomorphies: On the rear rim of the neck frill, the second and third epiparietals, which are skin ossifications attached to the rim, have a wide base, are vertically thick and curve obliquely upwards to the front, overhanging the rear and outer side branches of the parietal bone. The ischium has an expanded rectangular lower end.

Wendiceratops is further distinguished by the presence of an erect nose horn, and the lack of a vertical spike on the rear frill. The Chinese Sinoceratops has similar epiparietals, but in addition a central midline epiparietal and bumps below the epiparietals, which are lacking in Wendiceratops.

=== Skeleton ===
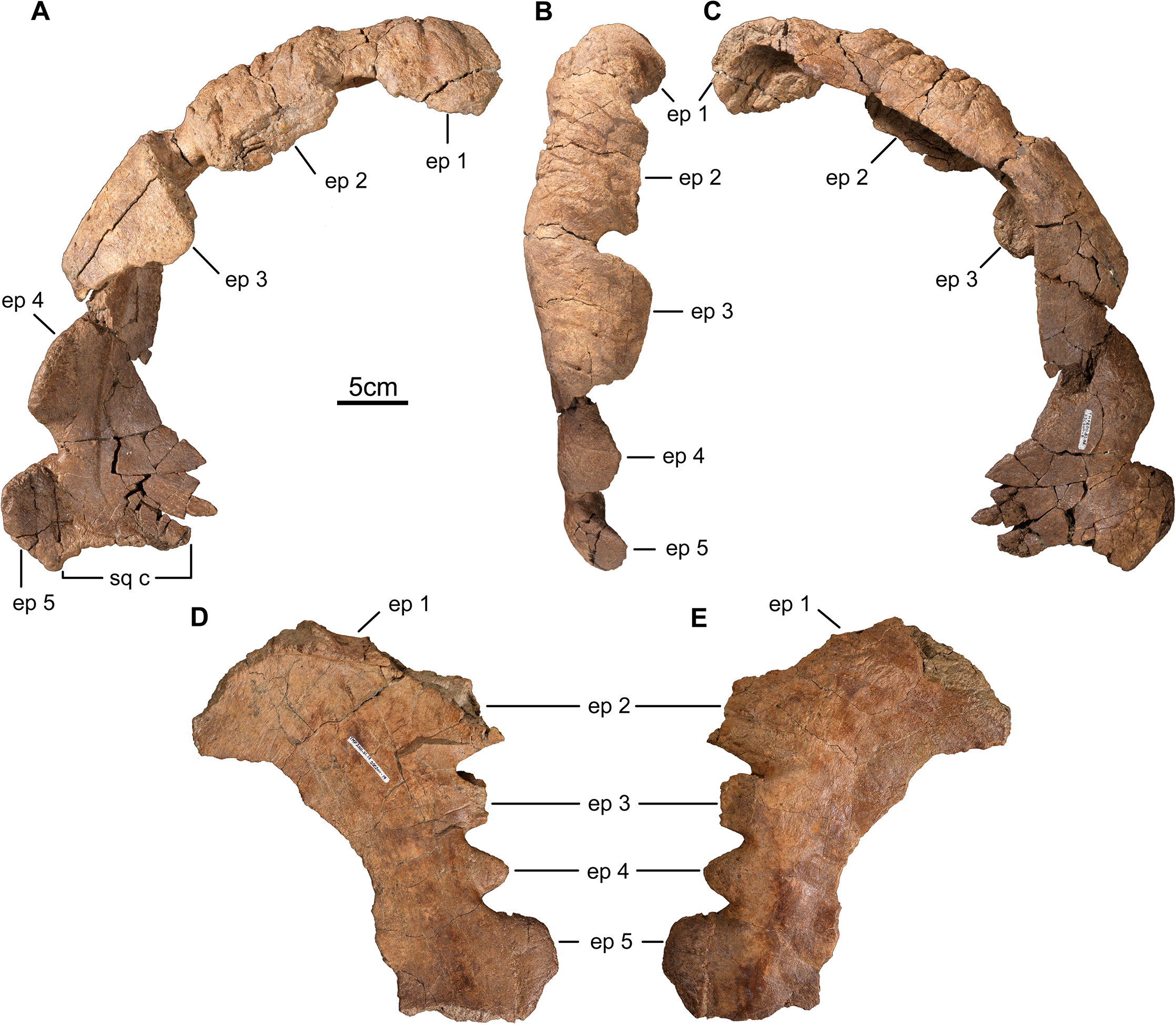
Parietal bone that formed the edge of the frill in several views

The maxilla, the upper jaw bone, of Wendiceratops had at least twenty-six tooth positions, in each of which several teeth were stacked to form a tooth battery. No orbital horns have been found. The nasal bone bore a vertical nasal horn. The exact size and profile of this horn are unknown but one broken specimen has a height of 11.5 centimetres (4.5 in) and a base length of 9 centimetres (3.5 in). Contact facets with the prefrontal bone suggest that the horn was located just in front of the eye sockets.

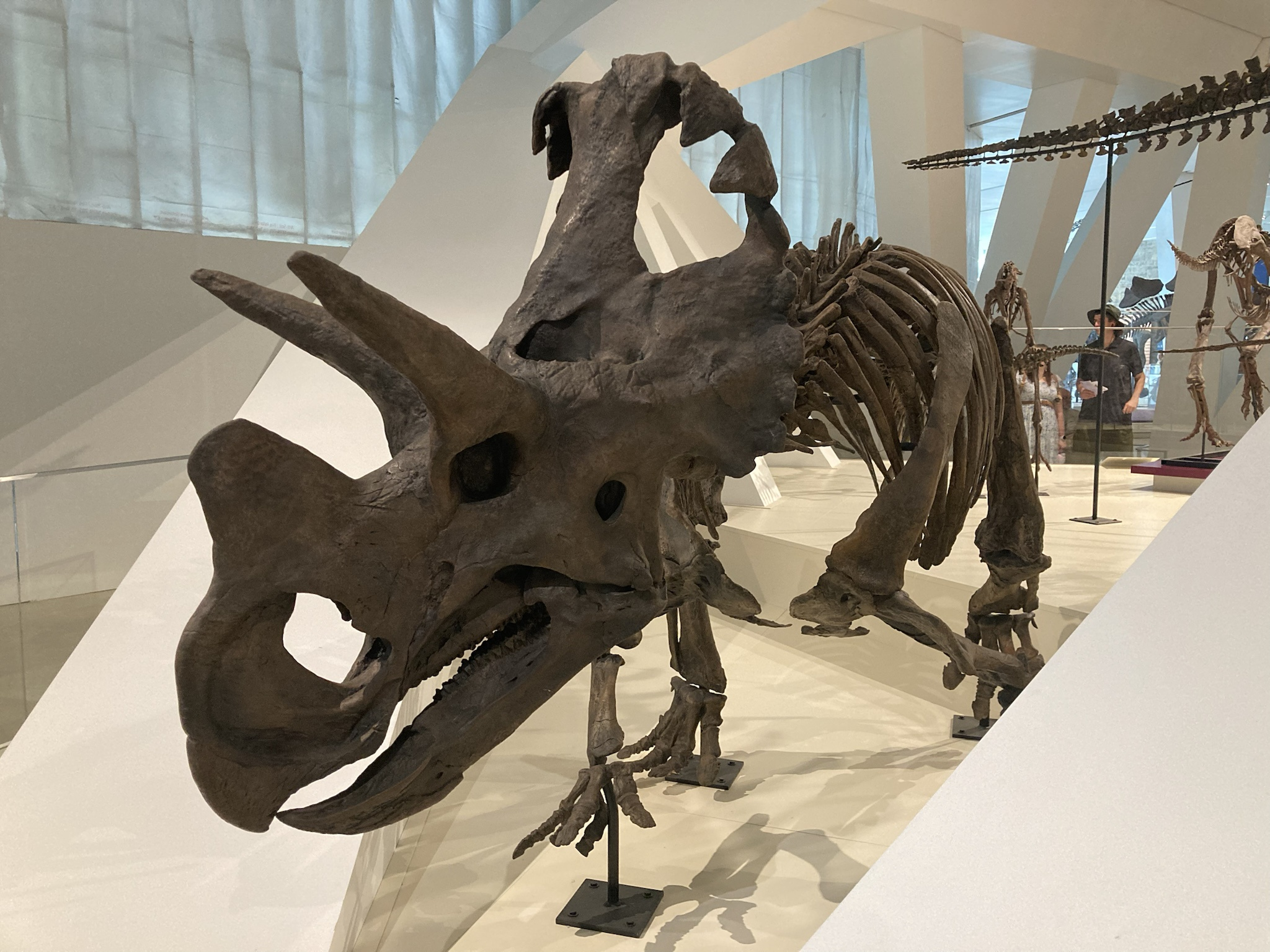
Mounted skeleton at Royal Ontario Museum

The skull frill of Wendiceratops was broad. The front side of the frill was formed by the squamosal bone which had a rectangular shape. To its edge four skin ossifications or osteoderms were attached, the episquamosals. They had an asymmetrical triangular shape. Uniquely, they curled upwards. From the position of the fourth, frontmost, episquamosal a relatively high ridge was running to the inside, adorned with three substantial bumps. In cross-section, this ridge gave the squamosal the typical "stepped" centrosaurine profile. The rear of the frill consisted of the rounded parietal bones. They too had osteoderms attached to their edges, in this case called epiparietals. Each parietal had five of them, conventionally numbered "p1" to "p5". The fifth and fourth epiparietals, the ones in front, resembled the episquamosals. However, more to the back the epiparietals became increasingly wider, longer and thicker, curving upwards and to the front. This resulted in the first epiparietal becoming tongue-shaped and overhanging a large part of the frill, slightly pointing outwards. In this area the frill edge continued the curvature of these osteoderms, concavely curling upwards. Close to the edge two paired large openings were present, the parietal fenestrae. As no complete frill has been found, their exact form is uncertain but they probably were shaped like transversely oriented ovals. These openings were separated by a broad bone bar which featured a midline ridge that was rather smooth, not adorned by bumps. The bar ended at a gentle embayment of the frill rear edge. This lacked a central epiparietal or "p0".

Whereas centrosaurine species each possessed a unique pattern of frill ornamentation, their postcranial skeleton, the parts of the body behind the skull, was very conservative, i.e. it showed little variation. Accordingly, the describers could find little of distinction among the Wendiceratops postcranial bones. An exception was the ischium. In other centrosaurines this pelvic bone had, in side view, the widest point of its shaft at midlength. The ischium of Wendiceratops however, grew wider towards its lower end, resulting in a generally rectangular shape.

Though most specimens were robust, apparently of adult individuals, some bones were of juveniles. Two shinbones were found with a length of just twenty centimetres.

== Classification ==
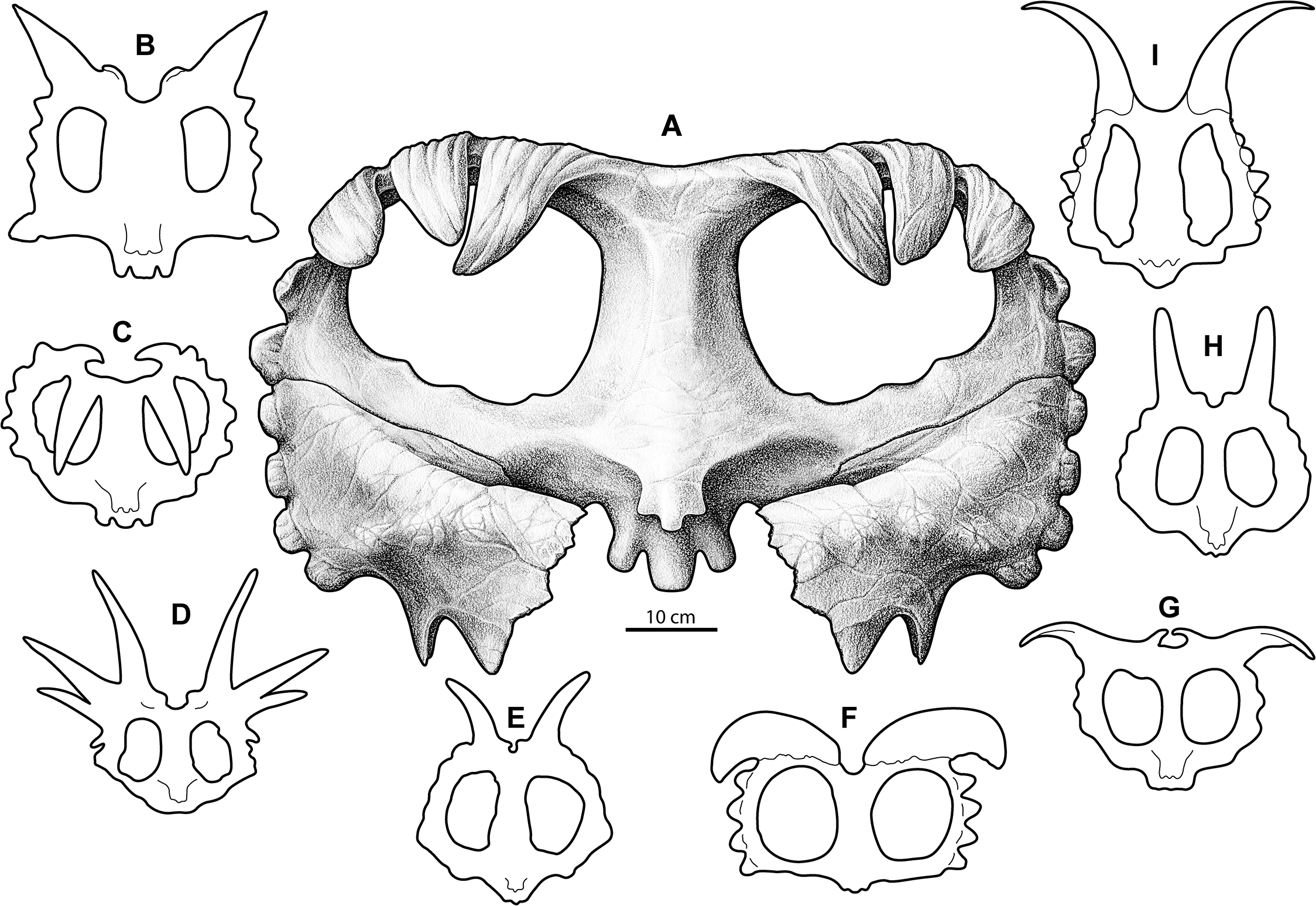
Reconstruction of the parietal bones of Wendiceratops and other centrosaurines

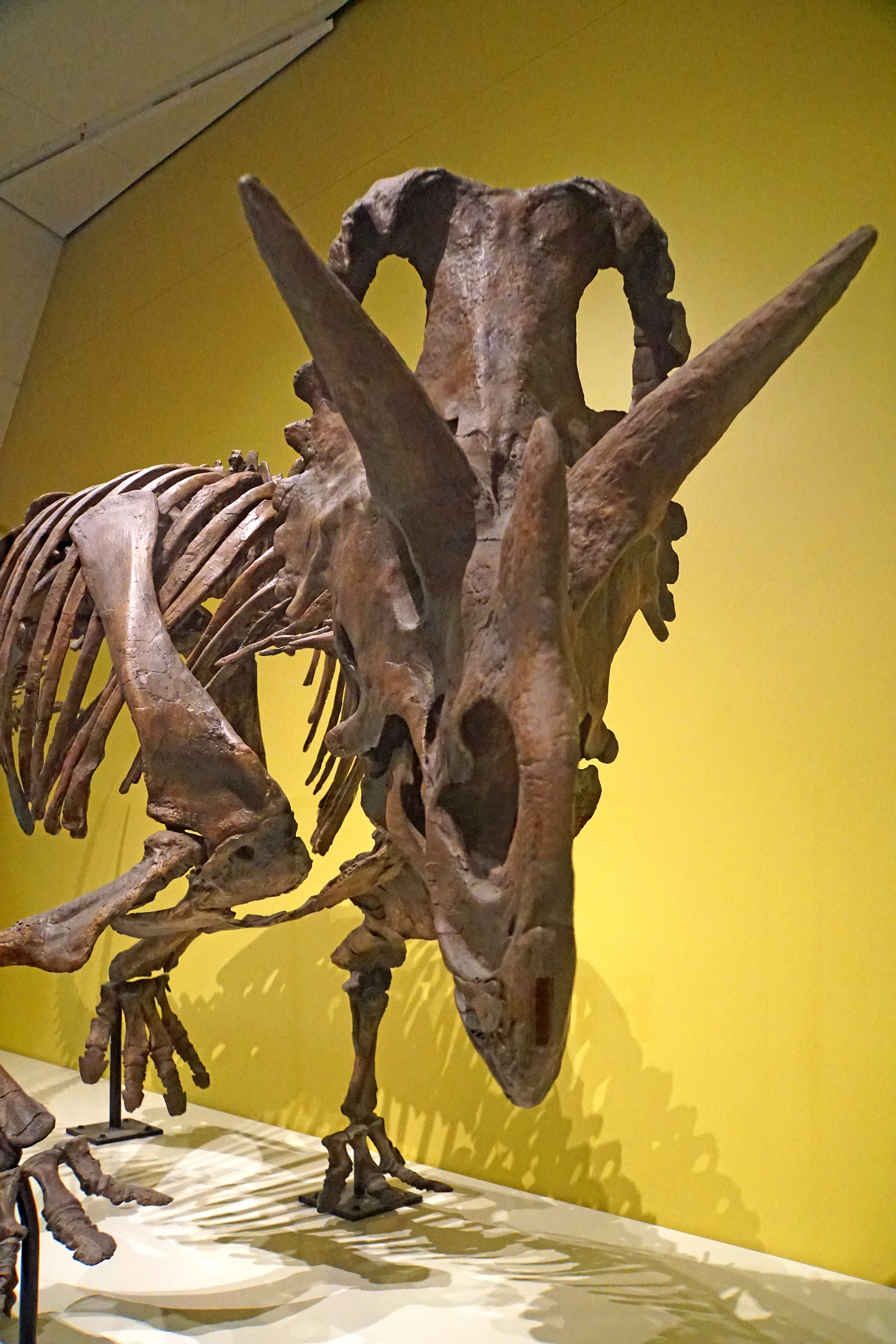
Reconstructed skeleton

Wendiceratops was placed in the Centrosaurinae, as a sister species to Sinoceratops. Their clade formed a "comb" or polytomy with Albertaceratops, another centrosaurine from the same formation, and the clade of the more derived centrosaurines. Wendiceratops and Sinoceratops were more derived, higher in the evolutionary tree, than Xenoceratops. Their nevertheless in general rather basal position is in accordance with the high absolute age of Wendiceratops living only a million years later than the oldest known centrosaurines Xenoceratops and Diabloceratops. The latest phylogenetic analysis including Wendiceratops is reproduced below, after Chiba et al. (2017):

- Centrosaurinae
  - - Diabloceratops eatoni
    - Machairoceratops cronusi
  - - Nasutoceratopsini
      - Avaceratops lammersi (ANSP 15800)
      - MOR 692
      - CMN 8804
      - Nasutoceratops titusi
      - Malta new taxon
    - - Xenoceratops foremostensis
      - - - Sinoceratops zhuchengensis
          - Wendiceratops pinhornensis
        - Albertaceratops nesmoi
        - Medusaceratops lokii
        - Eucentrosaura
          - Centrosaurini
            - - Rubeosaurus ovatus
              - Styracosaurus albertensis
            - - Coronosaurus brinkmani
              - - Centrosaurus apertus
                - Spinops sternbergorum
          - Pachyrhinosaurini
            - Einiosaurus procurvicornis
            - Pachyrostra
              - Achelousaurus horneri
              - - Pachyrhinosaurus canadensis
                - - Pachyrhinosaurus lakustai
                  - Pachyrhinosaurus perotorum

The nose horn of Wendiceratops, erect but probably of moderate size, was by the describing authors seen as a transition between the low horns of earlier forms like Diabloceratops, Nasutoceratops and Albertaceratops and the much taller horns of derived centrosaurines such as Coronosaurus, Centrosaurus and Styracosaurus. This would imply that the also long vertical nasal horn of the Chasmosaurinae would have separately been developed in a process of parallel evolution, the second time such a horn would have evolved among the ceratopsids. Remarkably, the curled epiparietals of Wendiceratops resemble the osteoderms of two chasmosaurines: Vagaceratops and Kosmoceratops, though they differ from the latter in their saddle-shaped interspaces.

== Paleobiology ==
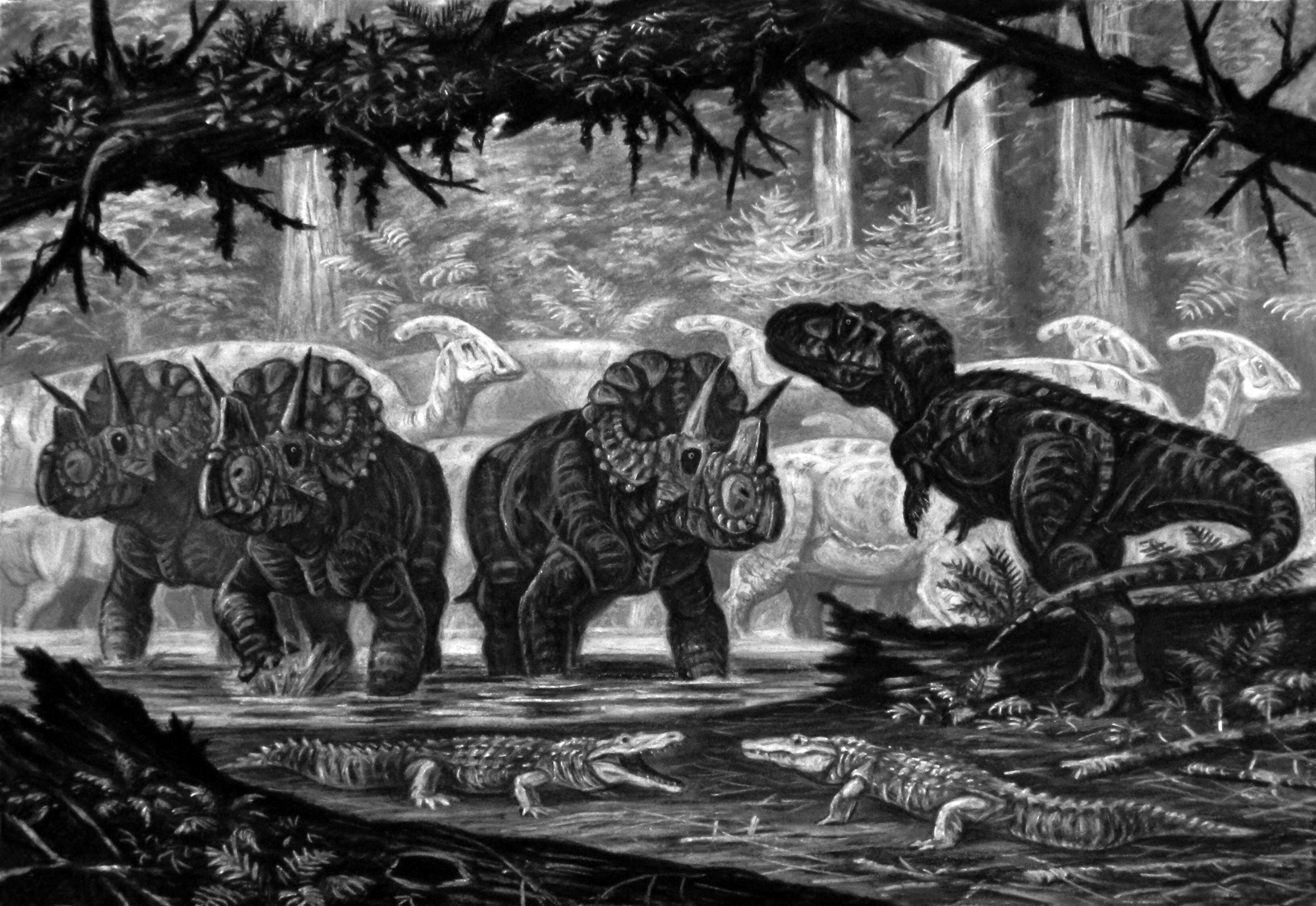
Restoration of Wendiceratops confronting Daspletosaurus

Being found in the Oldman Formation, Wendiceratops shared its habitat with other dinosaurs such as Daspletosaurus, Paronychodon, Troodon, Albertaceratops, and Parasaurolophus. The authors pointed out that after the discovery of Wendiceratops, no less than five ceratopsids are known from the lower Oldman or coeval North-American formations, in addition to Albertaceratops also Judiceratops, Medusaceratops and Avaceratops. They assumed this was made possible by ecological specialisations and also indicated a high faunal turnover, a quick succession of related species.
