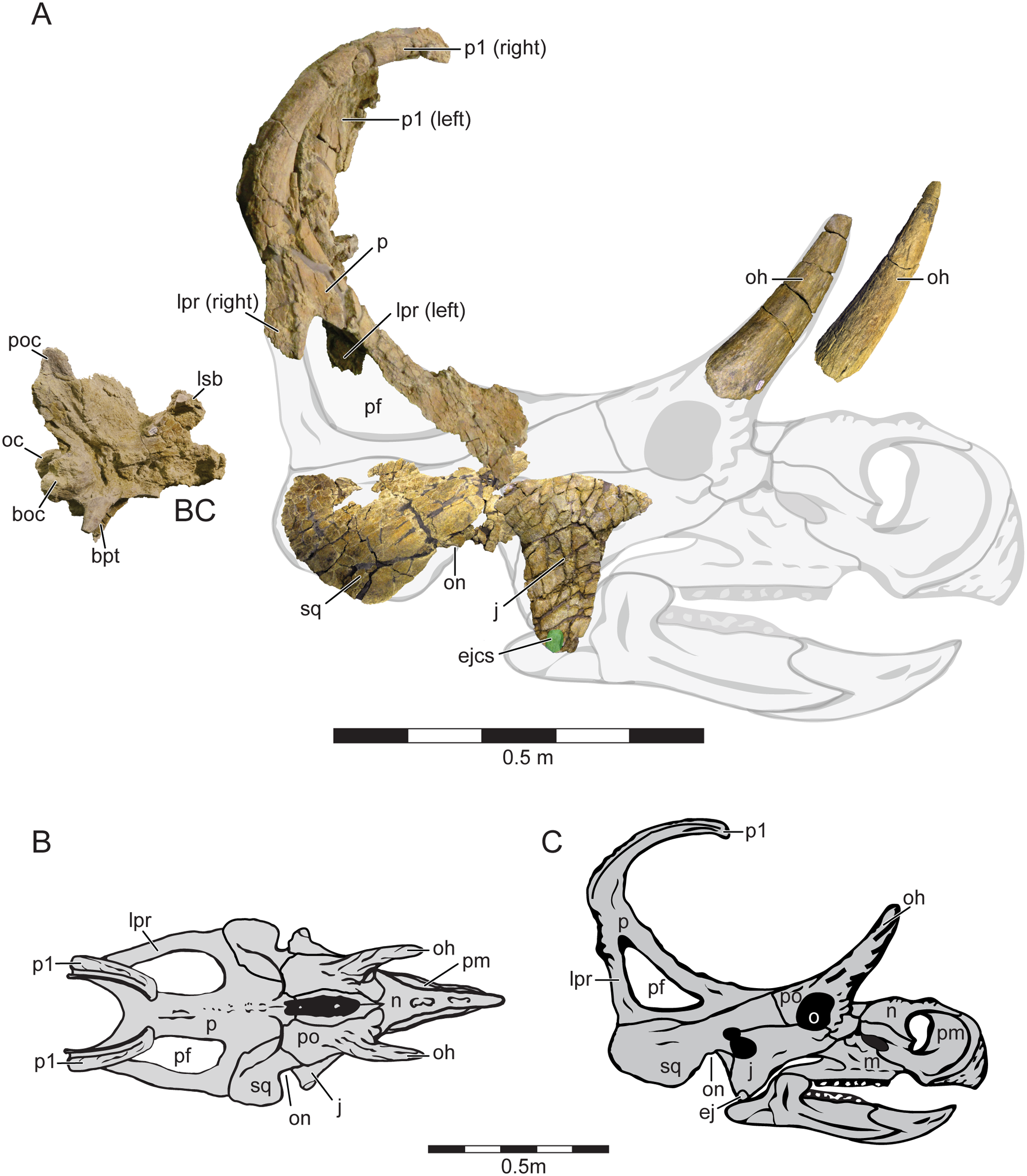
- Reconstructed skull

Scientific classification
- Kingdom: Animalia
- Phylum: Chordata
- Class: Reptilia
- Clade: Dinosauria
- Clade: †Ornithischia
- Clade: †Ceratopsia
- Family: †Ceratopsidae
- Subfamily: †Centrosaurinae
- Genus: †Machairoceratops; Lund et al., 2016

Type species
- †Machairoceratops cronusi Lund et al., 2016

= Machairoceratops =

Machairoceratops Temporal range: Late Cretaceous, 80.7–79.3 Ma

Extinct genus of dinosaurs

Machairoceratops (meaning "bent sword horned face"), previously known as the "Wahweap centrosaurine B", is an extinct genus of centrosaurine ceratopsian dinosaur known from the Late Cretaceous Wahweap Formation (late Campanian stage) of Grand Staircase–Escalante National Monument, southern Utah, United States.

== Discovery ==
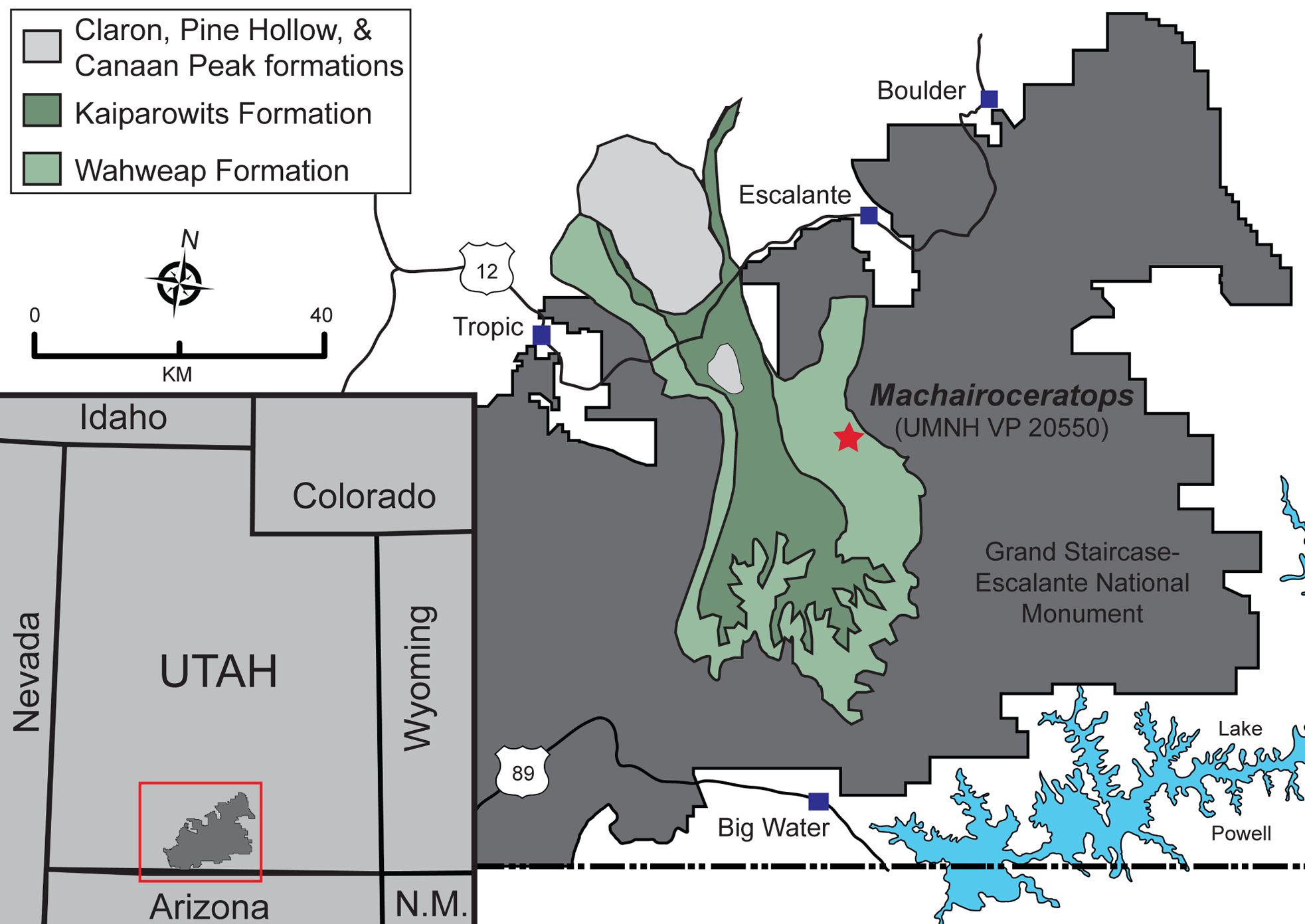
Map showing where the holotype was found

It contains a single species, M. cronusi, first described and named in 2016 by Eric K. Lund, Patrick M. O'Connor, Mark A. Loewen, and Zubair A. Jinnah. The generic name is derived from Greek machairis, meaning "bent sword", in reference to its unique frill ornamentation showing two forward curving horns on the frill's uppermost part, and Latinized Greek ceratops, meaning "horned-face", which is a common suffix for ceratopsian genera names. The specific name cronusi refers to Cronus, a Greek god who deposed his father Uranus by castrating him with a sickle or scythe based on the mythology, and as such is shown carrying a curved bladed weapon. Machairoceratops is known solely from the holotype UMNH VP 20550, found in 2006, which is housed at the Natural History Museum of Utah. It is represented by a partial skull including two curved and elongate eyesocket horncores, the left jugal bone, a nearly complete but slightly deformed braincase, the left squamosal bone, and a parietal bone complex and its unique horn ornamentation, all collected in association.

== Description ==
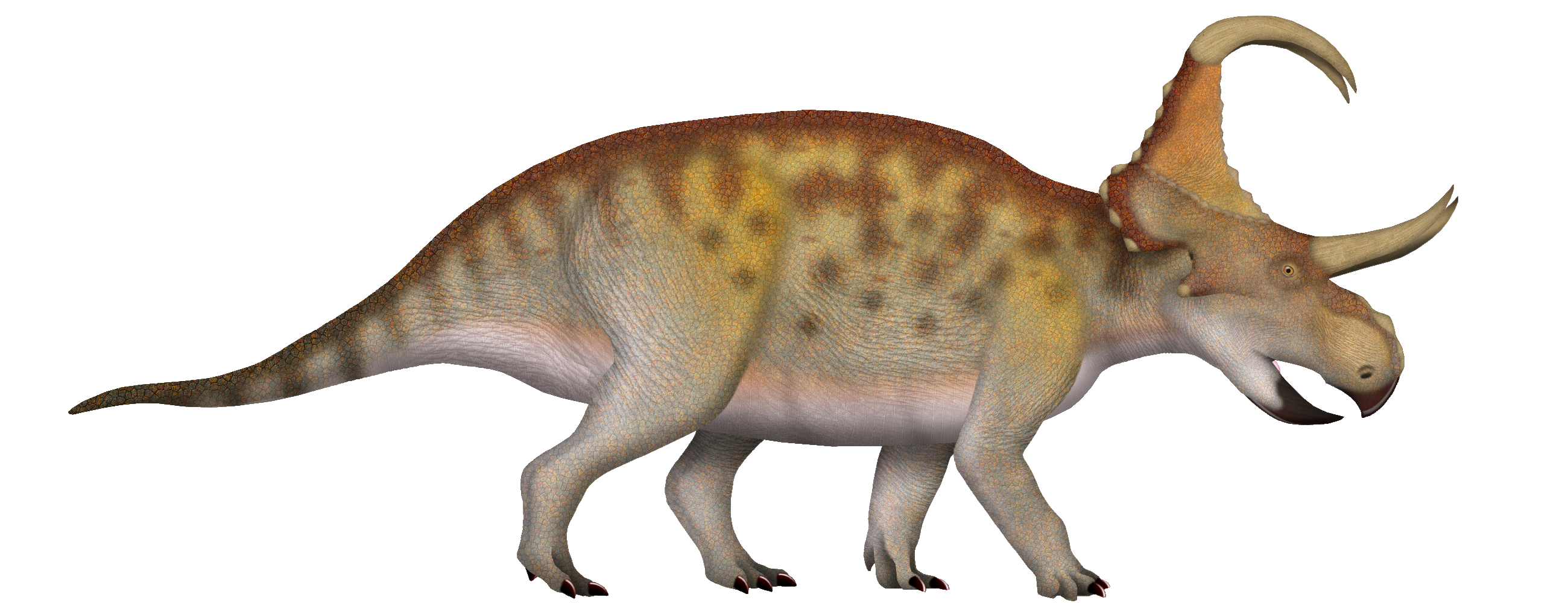
Hypothetical reconstruction of Machairoceratops with epiossifications on the frill

Machairoceratops was a quadrupedal herbivore with a frill protecting its neck. The top of the parietal bone features only one pair of long, curved, anteroposteriorly oriented spikes measuring 44 cm in length. The sides of the frill lack the smaller epiparietales that are present in other centrosaurines. This feature might be due to taphonomy, ontogeny or is unique to Machairoceratops. The squamosal has a fan-shaped form, characteristic of centrosaurines, but it also lacks any epiossifications. The postorbital horns, measuring 27 cm in length, are detached from the skull, and their exact orientation is unknown. The holotype of Machairoceratops is very close in size or the same size as Diabloceratops.

== Phylogeny ==
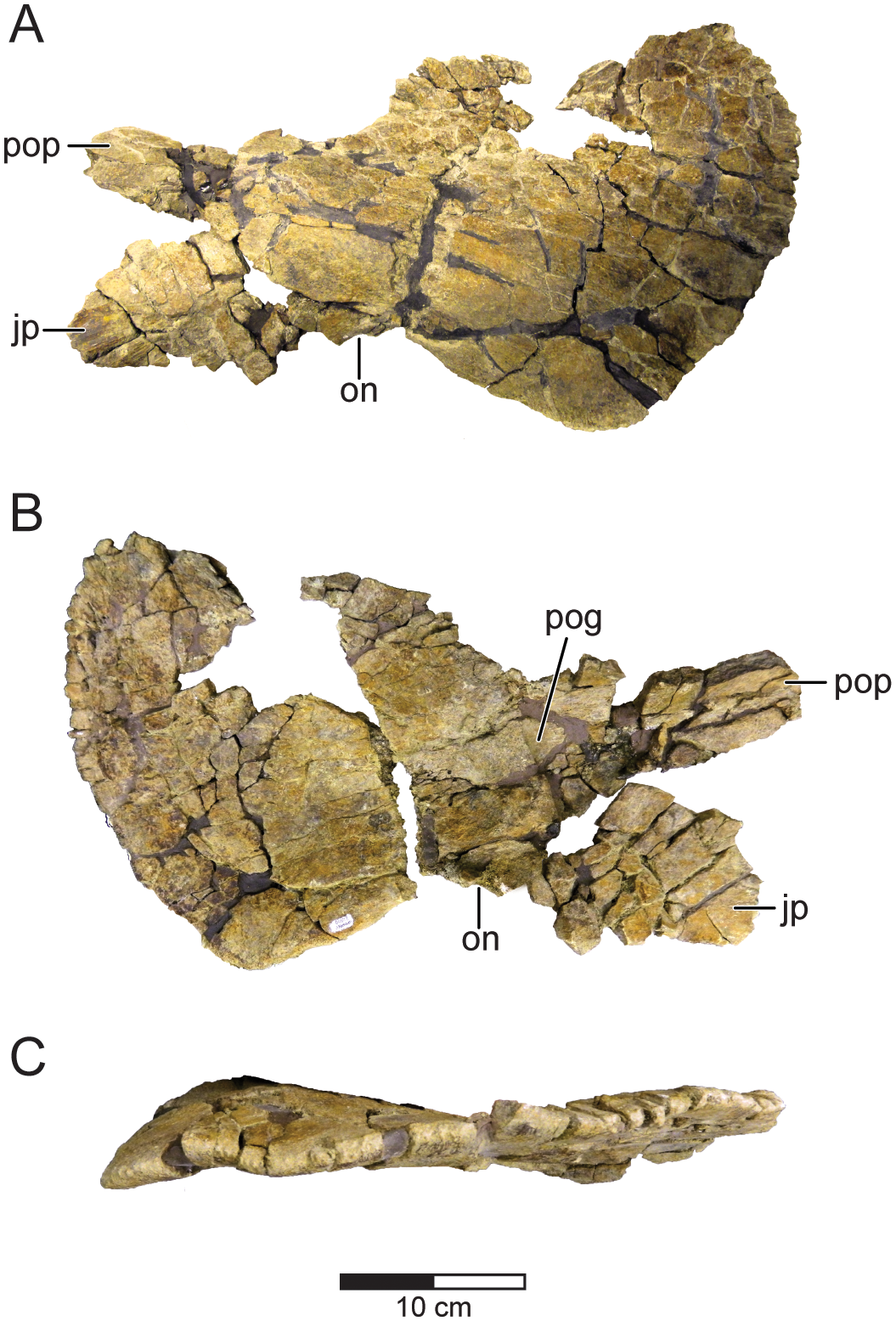
Left squamosal bone

Lund et al. (2016) tested the position of Machairoceratops within Centrosaurinae by performing maximum parsimony and Bayesian phylogenetic species level analyses. The maximum parsimony analysis yielded a large polytomy at the base of Centrosaurinae, with only Centrosaurini, most of Pachyrhinosaurini (Einiosaurus, Wendiceratops and Pachyrostra), and a clade formed by Avaceratops and Nasutoceratops being resolved. The Bayesian analysis yielded a fully resolved topology which is shown below.

- Ceratopsidae
  - Chasmosaurinae
  - Centrosaurinae
    - - Machairoceratops cronusi
      - - - Albertaceratops nesmoi
          - Diabloceratops eatoni
        - - Avaceratops lammersi
          - Nasutoceratops titusi
    - - Centrosaurini
      - Pachyrhinosaurini

The cladogram with comparative illustrations of the reconstructed frills of well-known genera below follows the 2024 phylogenetic analysis by Loewen and colleagues, and shows the position of Machairoceratops within Ceratopsidae:

- Centrosaurinae
  - Diabloceratops
  - Machairoceratops
  - - Yehuecauhceratops
    - Menefeeceratops
  - - Xenoceratops
    - ?
      CPC 279 (Cerro del Pueblo Fm. centrosaurine)
    - Nasutoceratopsini
      - Crittendenceratops
      - - Nasutoceratops
        - Avaceratops specimens
    - - Albertaceratopsini
        - Lokiceratops
        - - Albertaceratops
          - Medusaceratops
      - - - Wendiceratops
          - Sinoceratops
        - Eucentrosaura
          - Coronosaurus
          - Spinops
          - Centrosaurus
          - - Styracosaurus spp.
            - - Stellasaurus
              - Pachyrhinosaurini

== Paleoecology ==
=== Habitat ===
The Wahweap Formation has been radiometrically dated as being between 82.2 and 77.3 million years old. The precise age of Machairoceratops has been estimated to be 80.06 Ma, with a range of uncertainty between 80.68-79.26 Ma. During the time that Machairoceratops lived, the Western Interior Seaway was at its widest extent, almost completely isolating southern Laramidia from the rest of North America. The area where dinosaurs lived included lakes, floodplains, and east-flowing rivers. The Wahweap Formation is part of the Grand Staircase region, an immense sequence of sedimentary rock layers that stretch south from Bryce Canyon National Park through Zion National Park and into the Grand Canyon. The presence of rapid sedimentation and other evidence suggests a wet, seasonal climate.

=== Paleofauna ===
Machairoceratops shared its paleoenvironment with other dinosaurs, such as the hadrosaur Acristavus gagslarsoni, centrosaur Diabloceratops eatoni and the lambeosaur Adelolophus hutchisoni, unnamed ankylosaurs and pachycephalosaurs, and the theropod Lythronax argestes, which was likely the apex predator in its ecosystem. Vertebrates present in the Wahweap Formation at the time of Machairoceratops included freshwater fish, bowfins, abundant rays and sharks, turtles like Compsemys, crocodilians, and lungfish. A fair number of mammals lived in this region, which included several genera of multituberculates, cladotherians, marsupials, and placental insectivores. The mammals are more primitive than those that lived in the area that is now the Kaiparowits Formation. Trace fossils are relatively abundant in the Wahweap Formation, and suggest the presence of crocodylomorphs, as well as ornithischian and theropod dinosaurs. In 2010 a unique trace fossil was discovered that suggests a predator-prey relationship between dinosaurs and primitive mammals. The trace fossil includes at least two fossilized mammalian den complexes as well as associated digging grooves presumably caused by a maniraptoran dinosaur. The proximity indicates a case of probable active predation of the burrow inhabitants by the animals that made the claw marks. Invertebrate activity in this formation ranged from fossilized insect burrows in petrified logs to various mollusks, large crabs, and a wide diversity of gastropods and ostracods.

== See also ==
- Timeline of ceratopsian research
- 2016 in paleontology
