= Point Lookout (Colorado) =

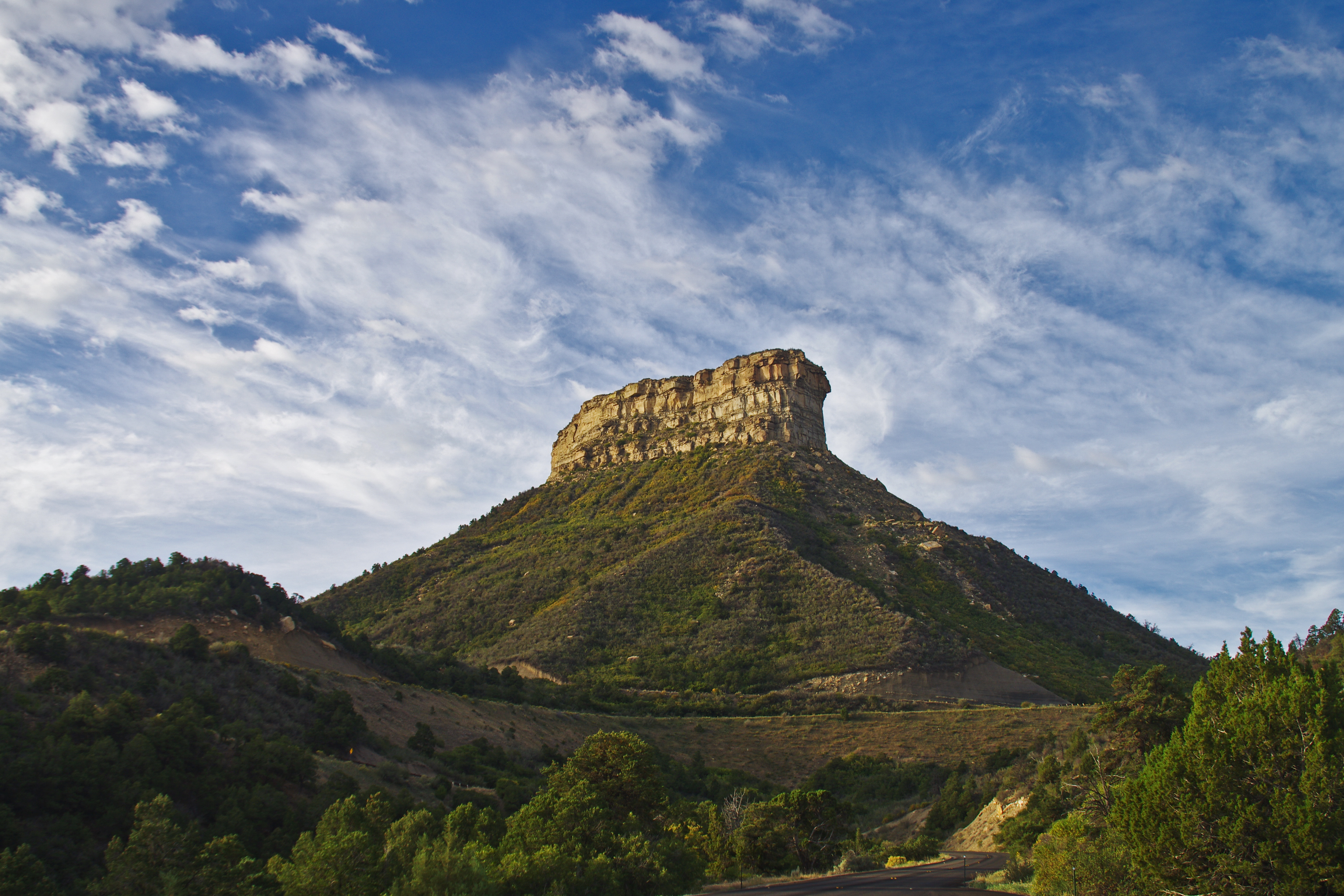
- North aspect

Highest point
- Elevation: 8,427 ft (2,569 m)
- Prominence: 607 ft (185 m)
- Parent peak: Park Point (8,571 ft)
- Isolation: 3.39 mi (5.46 km)
- Coordinates: 37°18′57″N 108°25′07″W

Geography
- Location within Colorado Location within the United States
- Location: Mesa Verde National Park; Montezuma County, Colorado, U.S.
- Parent range: Colorado Plateau
- Topo map: USGS Point Lookout

Geology
- Rock age: Cretaceous
- Rock type: Point Lookout Sandstone

Climbing
- Easiest route: class 1 hiking trail

Point Lookout is an 8,427-foot (2,569 meter) elevation sandstone summit located in Mesa Verde National Park, in Montezuma County of southwest Colorado. This prominent landmark is situated 2 miles (3.2 km) south of the park entrance, and 9.3 miles (15.0 km) east-southeast of the town of Cortez, and towers 1,600 feet above the surrounding terrain of Mancos Valley. Soldiers from Fort Lewis army post used its lofty position to send heliographic signals to troops campaigning in the west. A trail climbs 2.2 miles (3.5 km) round-trip to the top and offers views of Montezuma and Mancos valleys, as well as the La Plata Mountains. This geographical feature's name was officially adopted in 1934 by the U.S. Board on Geographic Names.

== Geology ==
The main entrance road to Mesa Verde National Park traverses the east flank of Point Lookout as it climbs the escarpment of the East Rim of Mesa Verde. Point Lookout is located on the Colorado Plateau, and is composed of 400-foot thick Cretaceous Point Lookout Sandstone, which is the oldest of the three formations that make up the Mesaverde Group which is common to the Mesa Verde region. The cliff-forming Point Lookout Sandstone overlays softer, slope-forming Mancos Shale, which is 2,000 feet thick and extends to the valley floor. Precipitation runoff from this feature drains into the San Juan River watershed.

== Gallery ==
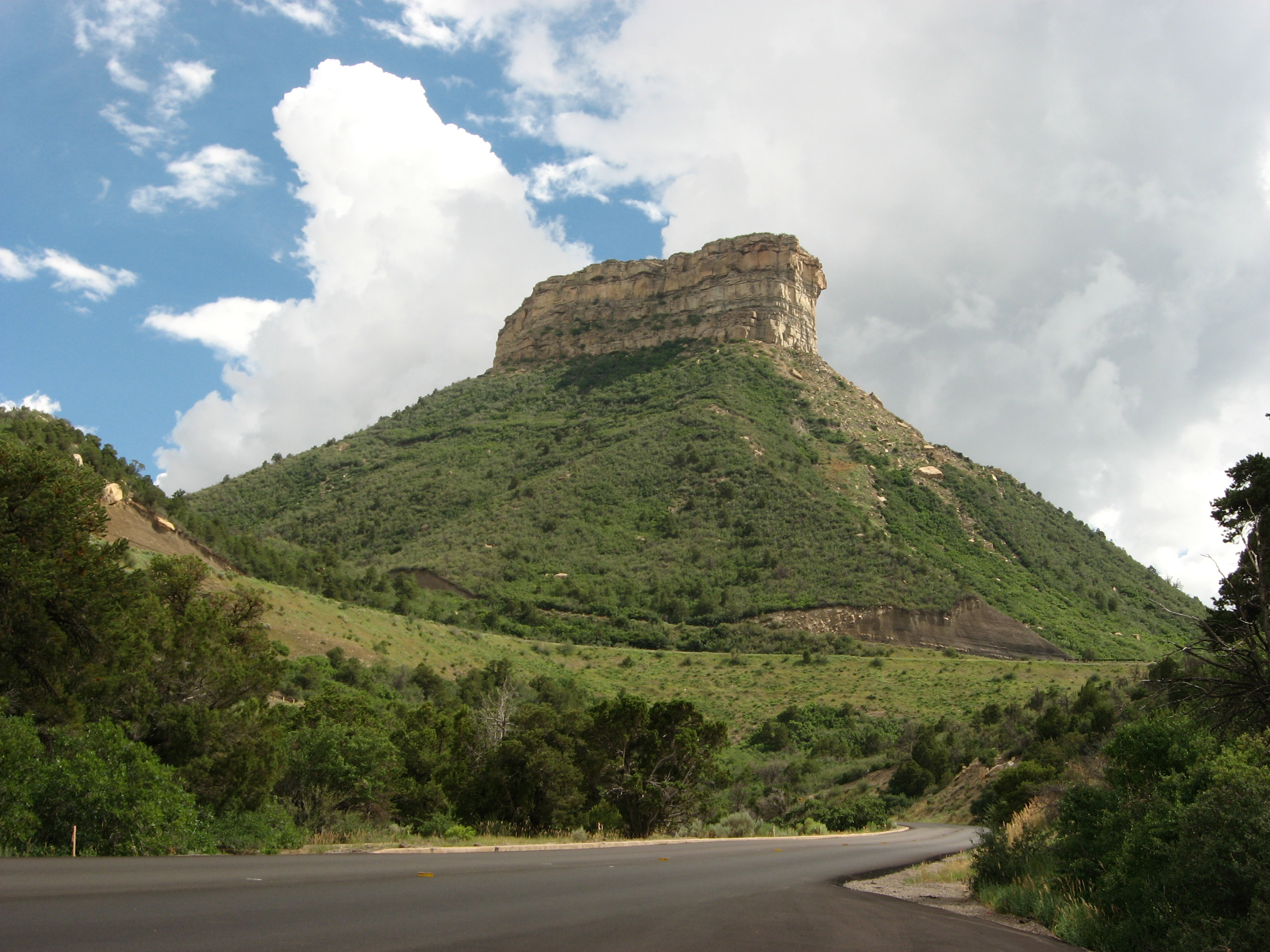

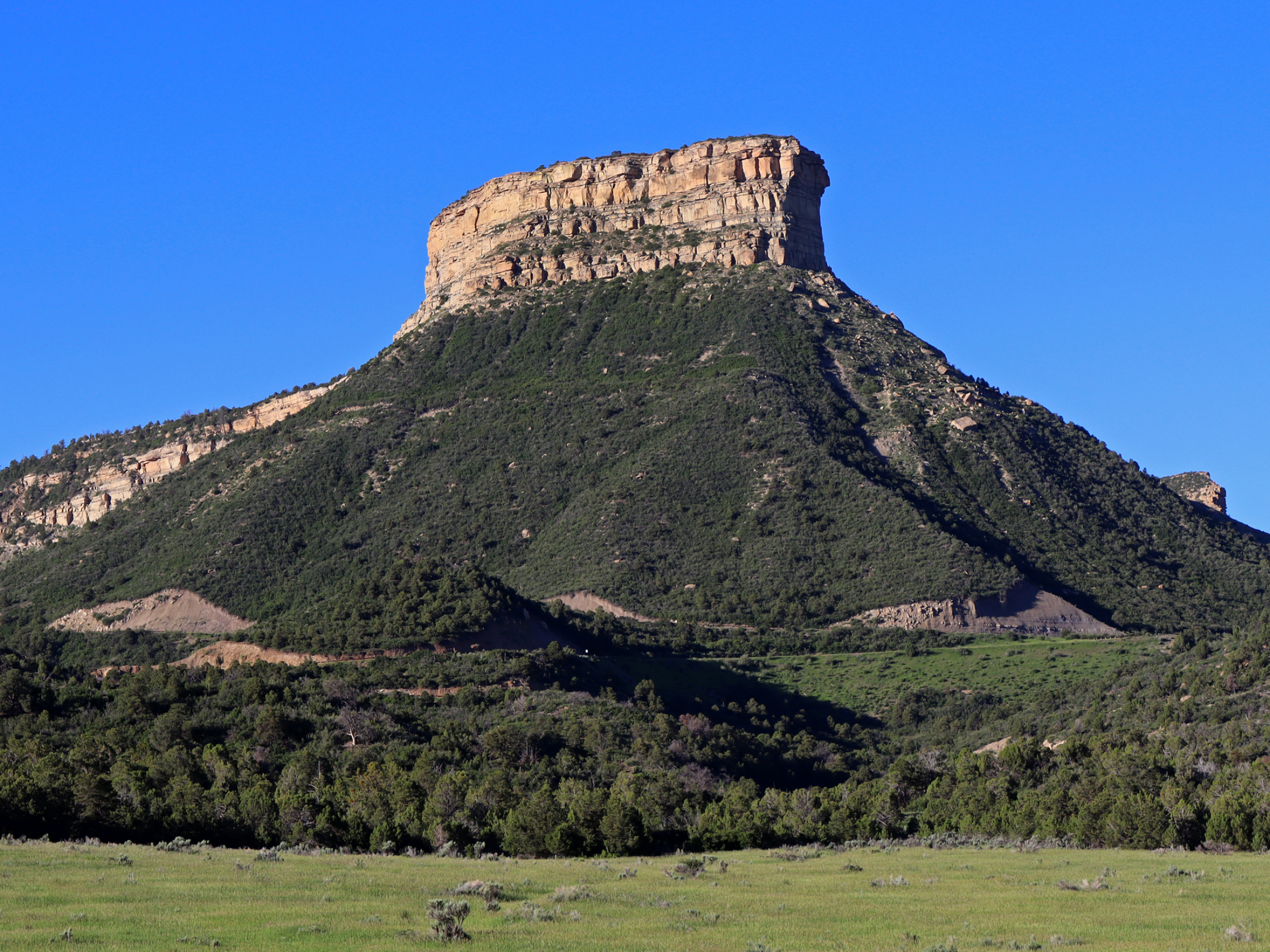

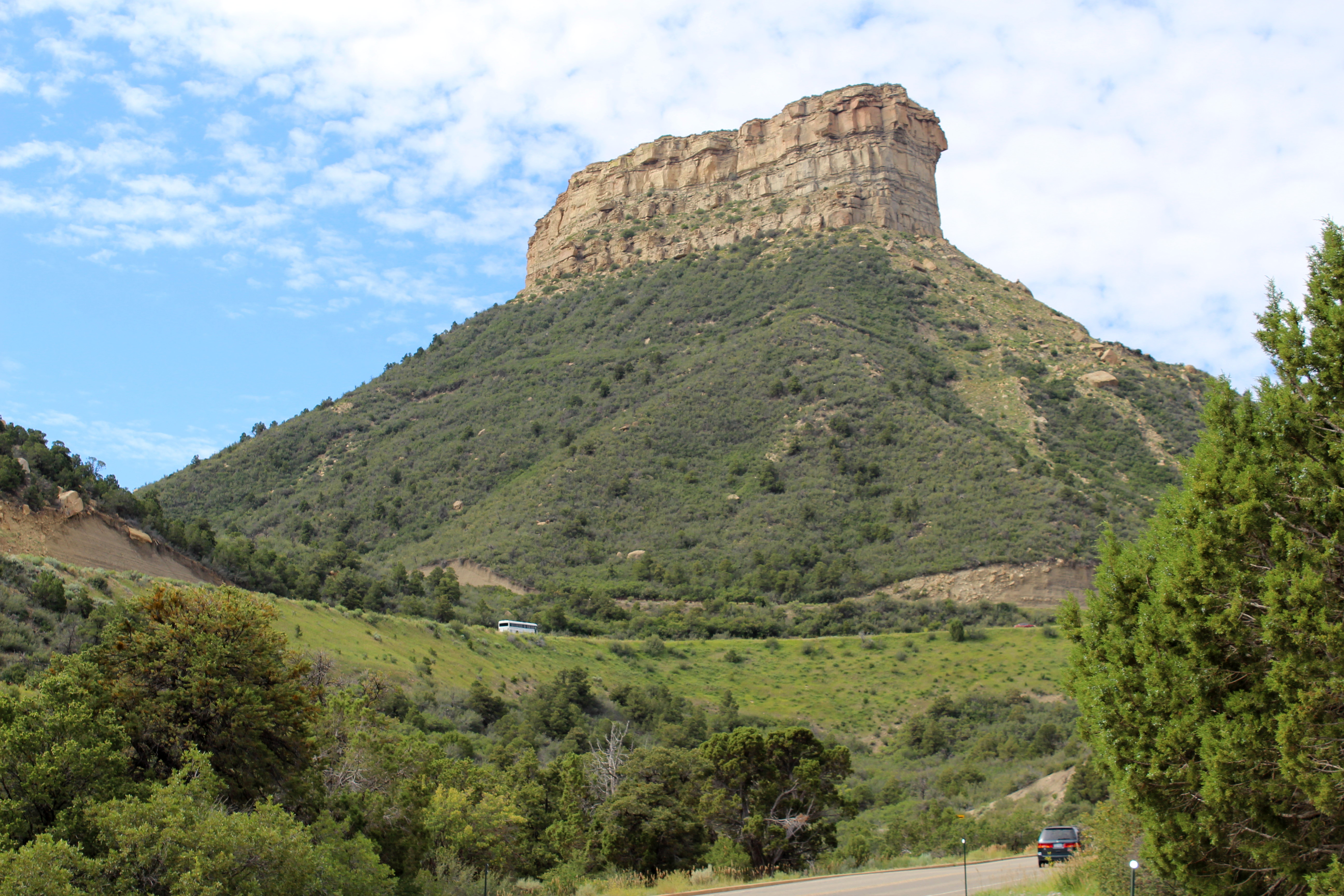

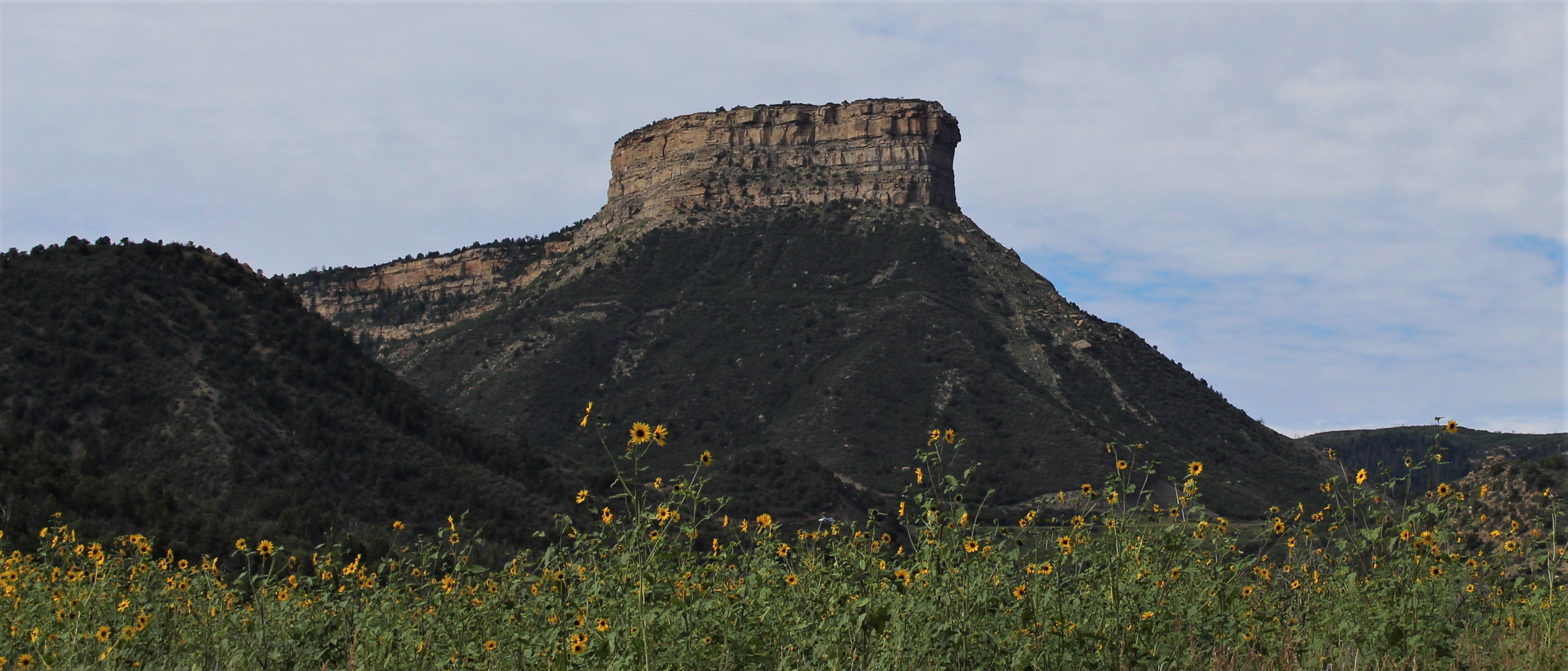

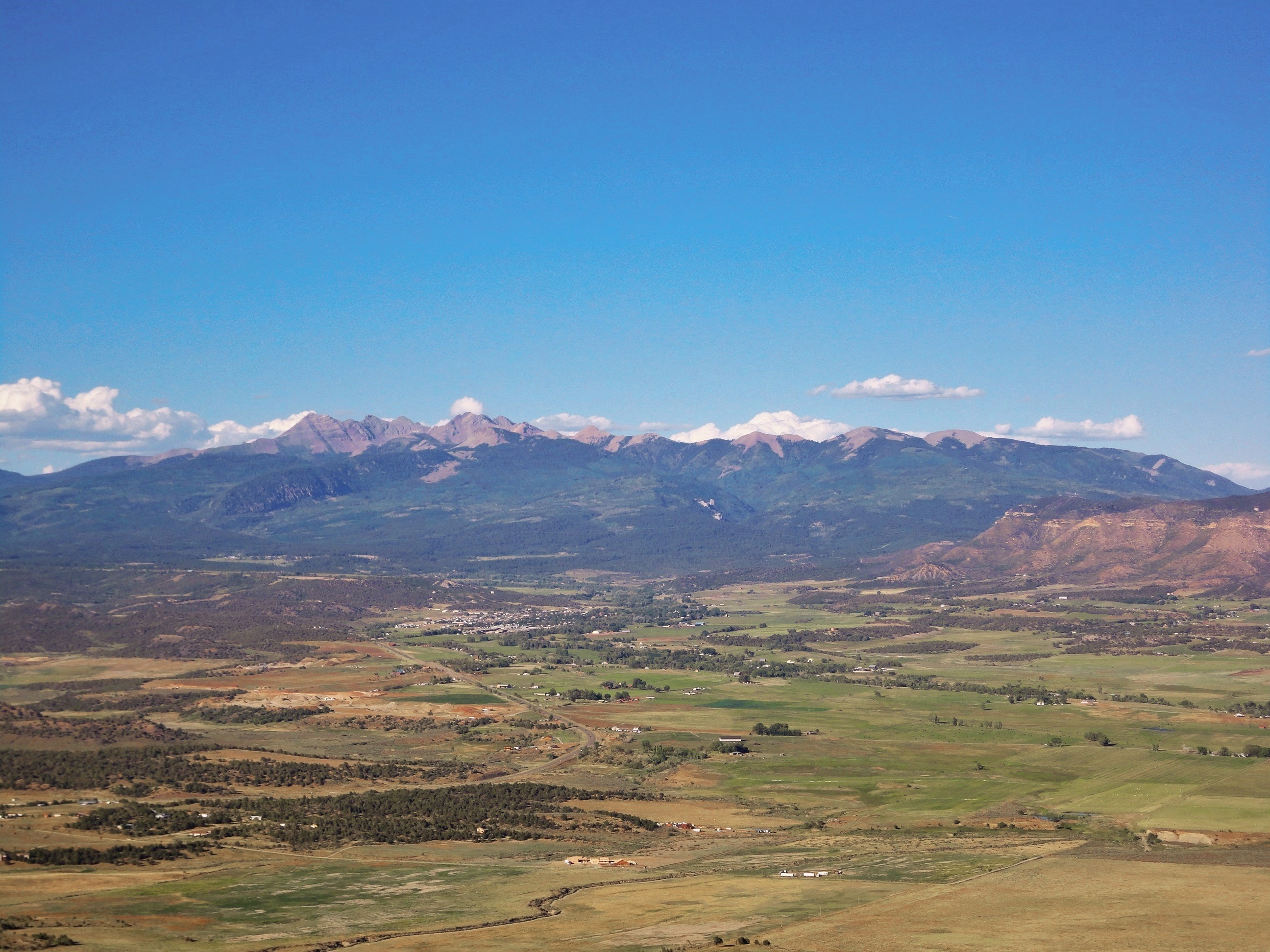
Mancos Valley and La Plata Mountains from Point Lookout

== Climate ==
According to the Köppen climate classification system, Point Lookout is located in a Humid continental climate zone. April through October are the most favorable months to visit.

Climate data for Mesa Verde Park Headquarters. Elev: 6877 ft (2096 m)
Month	Jan	Feb	Mar	Apr	May	Jun	Jul	Aug	Sep	Oct	Nov	Dec	Year
Mean daily maximum °F (°C)	39.5 (4.2)	43.1 (6.2)	50.5 (10.3)	58.6 (14.8)	68.6 (20.3)	79.6 (26.4)	84.9 (29.4)	82.1 (27.8)	74.5 (23.6)	62.3 (16.8)	49.4 (9.7)	39.7 (4.3)	61.2 (16.2)
Daily mean °F (°C)	28.6 (−1.9)	32.0 (0.0)	38.7 (3.7)	45.5 (7.5)	54.8 (12.7)	64.6 (18.1)	70.3 (21.3)	68.3 (20.2)	60.9 (16.1)	49.5 (9.7)	37.9 (3.3)	29.0 (−1.7)	48.4 (9.1)
Mean daily minimum °F (°C)	17.7 (−7.9)	20.9 (−6.2)	26.8 (−2.9)	32.4 (0.2)	41.0 (5.0)	49.5 (9.7)	55.7 (13.2)	54.6 (12.6)	47.3 (8.5)	36.7 (2.6)	26.5 (−3.1)	18.3 (−7.6)	35.7 (2.1)
Average precipitation inches (mm)	1.58 (40)	1.48 (38)	1.61 (41)	1.21 (31)	1.00 (25)	0.53 (13)	1.61 (41)	2.12 (54)	1.84 (47)	1.64 (42)	1.47 (37)	1.45 (37)	17.54 (446)
Average relative humidity (%)	61.7	57.8	47.0	38.7	33.1	25.6	32.1	39.9	38.1	40.7	49.4	59.1	43.6
Average dew point °F (°C)	17.1 (−8.3)	18.8 (−7.3)	20.2 (−6.6)	21.8 (−5.7)	26.3 (−3.2)	28.5 (−1.9)	39.1 (3.9)	43.0 (6.1)	35.2 (1.8)	26.6 (−3.0)	20.6 (−6.3)	16.5 (−8.6)	26.2 (−3.2)
Source: PRISM Climate Group

== See also ==
- List of rock formations in the United States
