= Mesaverde Group =

Group of geologic formations in the western United States

- Stratigraphic range: Late Cretaceous
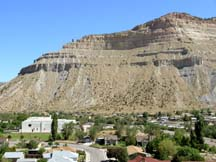
- Mesaverde Group beds in the Book Cliffs near Helper, Utah.
- Type: Group
- Sub-units: See text
- Underlies: Lewis Shale, Meeteetse Formation, Datil Group (regionally)
- Overlies: Cody Shale, Mancos Shale
- Thickness: 200–400 metres (660–1,310 ft)

Lithology
- Primary: sandstone and shale
- Other: coal

Location
- Coordinates: 37.316°N 108.419°W
- Extent: New Mexico, Utah, Wyoming

Type section
- Named for: Mesa Verde, Colorado
- Named by: W.H.Holmes (1877)
- Mesaverde Group (the United States) Mesaverde Group (Colorado)

The Mesaverde Group is a Late Cretaceous stratigraphic group found in areas of Colorado, New Mexico, Utah, and Wyoming, in the Western United States.

== History ==
The Mesaverde Formation was first described by W.H.Holmes in 1877 during the Hayden Survey. Holmes described the formation in the northern San Juan Basin as consisting of three units, which were a "Lower Escarpment" consisting of 40 m of ledge- and cliff-forming massive sandstone; a "Middle Coal Group" consisting of up to 300 m of thick slope-forming sandstone, shale, marl, and lignite; and an "Upper Escarpment" consisting of 60 m of ledge- and cliff-forming sandstone. A.J. Collier redesignated these units in 1919 as the Point Lookout Sandstone, the Menefee Formation, and the Cliff House Sandstone, and raised the Mesaverde Formation to group rank.

The group was later traced to the greater Green River Basin, the Uintah and Piceance Basins, the Bighorn Basin, the Front Range, the Zuni Basin, the Wasatch Plateau, Wind River Basin, Washakie Basin, and the Powder River Basin. It is spectacularly exposed along the Book Cliffs of eastern Utah and western Colorado. With the recognition of the vast extent of the group, the group has been divided into formations by region, with the original Point Lookout Sandstone, Menefee Formation, and Cliff House Sandstone being restricted largely to the San Juan Basin and the Madrid, New Mexico area.

== Geology ==
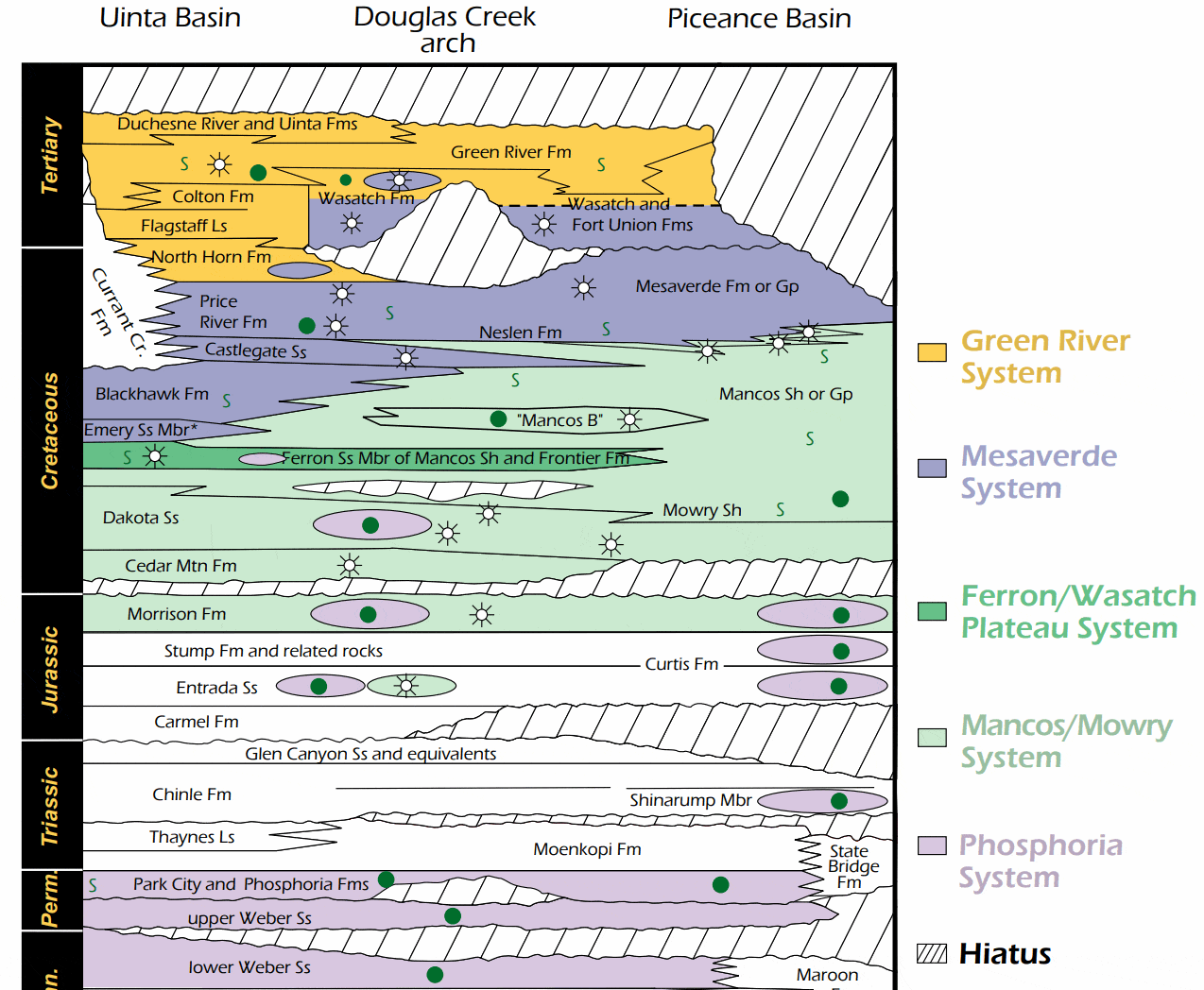
Stratigraphic column showing the relationship of the Mesaverde Group

The Mesaverde Group is a Late Cretaceous stratigraphic group found in areas of Colorado, New Mexico, Utah, and Wyoming, in the Western United States. The group is a single regression-transgression sequence in its type location in the San Juan Basin, dividing the older marine Mancos Shale and younger Lewis Shale deposited in the Western Interior Seaway. The Point Lookout Sandstone represents the regression, the Menefee Formation the subsequent fluvial delta deposits, and the Cliff House Sandstone the return of the sea. In other locations, such as along the Book Cliffs, the picture is more complicated, with multiple regression-transgression sequences from tectonic activity along the Sevier mountain front. In the Cody area, the group is a simple regression sequence and remains at formation rank. Here the group is described as interbedded light gray sandstone and gray shale in the upper part; massive, light-buff, ledge-forming sandstone containing thin lenticular coal beds in the lower part.

=== Formations ===
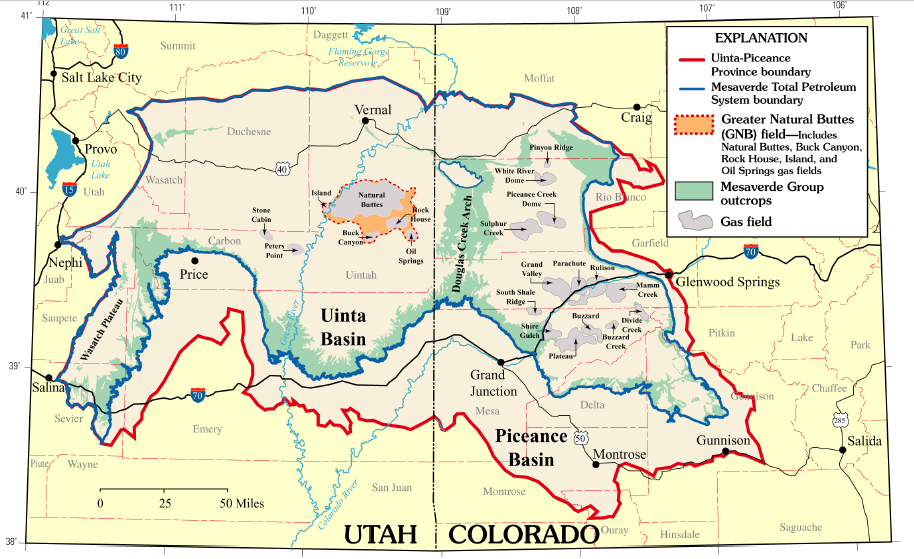
Mesaverde Gas Fields within the Uinta Basin and Piceance Basin

- Northern Piceance Basin:
  - Williams Fork Formation
  - Iles Formation
- southwestern Piceance Basin:
  - Hunter Canyon Formation
  - Mount Garfield Formation
- Powder River Basin:
  - Teapot Sandstone
  - Parkman Sandstone
- Northern San Juan Basin:
  - Point Lookout Sandstone
  - Menefee Formation
  - Cliff House Sandstone
- Southern San Juan Basin and southern New Mexico:
  - Point Lookout Sandstone
  - Crevasse Canyon Formation
  - Gallup Sandstone
- Uintah Basin:
  - Tuscher Formation
  - Farrer Formation
  - Neslen Formation
  - Sego Sandstone
  - Price River Formation
  - Castlegate Sandstone
  - Blackhawk Formation
  - Star Point Sandstone
- Washakie Basin:
  - Almond Formation
  - Ericson Sandstone
  - Rock Springs Formation
  - Blair Formation

=== Fossils ===
Dinosaur remains are among the fossils that have been recovered from the group, including Dynamoterror, Menefeeceratops and Invictarx from the Menefee Formation. Deinosuchus has also been reported from Mesaverde outcrops in Wyoming. In 2023, baenid turtle fossils tentatively assignable to Neurankylus sp. from the Mesaverde Formation were described.

== See also ==
- List of dinosaur-bearing rock formations
  - List of stratigraphic units with indeterminate dinosaur fossils

== Footnotes ==
=== References ===
- Ball, M.W. (1924). "Gas near Fort Collins, Colorado: GEOLOGICAL NOTES". AAPG Bulletin. 8 (1): 79–87. doi:10.1306/3D932659-16B1-11D7-8645000102C1865D.
- Barwin, J.R. (1959). "Facies of Mesaverde Formation, East-Central Wyoming: ABSTRACT". AAPG Bulletin. 43. doi:10.1306/0BDA5D20-16BD-11D7-8645000102C1865D.
- Collier, A.J. (1919). "Coal south of Mancos, Montezuma County, Colorado" (PDF). U.S. Geological Survey Bulletin. 691-K: K293–K310.
- Fenneman, N.M.; Gale, H.S. (1906). "The Yampa coal field, Routt county, Colorado". U.S. Geological Survey Bulletin. 297: 7–81. doi:10.3133/b297. hdl:2346/65003.
- Fillmore, Robert (2011). Geological evolution of the Colorado Plateau of eastern Utah and western Colorado, including the San Juan River, Natural Bridges, Canyonlands, Arches, and the Book Cliffs. Salt Lake City: University of Utah Press. pp. 224, 247–248. ISBN 978-1-60781-004-9.
- Fox, J.E. (1993). "Stratigraphic cross sections showing electric logs of Upper Cretaceous and older rocks, Powder River basin, southeastern Montana and northeastern Wyoming". U.S. Geological Survey Oil and Gas Investigations Chart. OC-135 to OC-138, Sections A-A' through F-F', G-G' through L-L', M-M' through R-R', S-S' through V-V'. doi:10.3133/oc135.
- Fouch, T.D.; Nuccio, V.F.; Osmond, J.C.; MacMillan, Logan; Cashion, W.B.; Wandrey, C.J. (1992). "Oil and gas in uppermost Cretaceous and Tertiary rock, Uinta basin, Utah". Utah Geological Association Guidebook. 20: 9–48.
- Hale, L.A. (1961). "Late Cretaceous (Montanan) stratigraphy eastern Washakie basin, Carbon County, Wyoming". Wyoming Geological Association Field Conference Guidebook. 16: 129–137.
- Holmes, W.H. (1877). "Report [on the San Juan District, Colorado]". In Hayden, F.V. (ed.). Ninth annual report of the United States Geological and Geographical Survey of the Territories, embracing Colorado and parts of adjacent territories, being a report of progress of the exploration for the year 1875; Part I, Geology. U.S. Geological and Geographical Survey of the Territories (Hayden). pp. 237–276.
- Johnson, R.C. (1989). "Geologic history and hydrocarbon potential of Late Cretaceous-age, low-permeability reservoirs, Piceance Basin, western Colorado". U.S. Geological Survey Bulletin. 1787-E: E1–E51. doi:10.3133/b1787E.
- Lee, W.T. (1909). "The Grand Mesa coal field, Colorado". U.S. Geological Survey Bulletin. 341: 316–334. doi:10.3133/b341.
- Lupton, C.T. (1916). "Contributions to economic geology, 1915, Part II, Mineral fuels--Oil and gas near Basin, Big Horn County, Wyoming". U.S. Geological Survey Bulletin. 621-L: L157–L190. doi:10.3133/b621L.
- Molenaar, C.M. (1983). "A principal reference section and correlation of the Gallup Sandstone, northwestern New Mexico" (PDF). New Mexico Bureau of Mines and Mineral Resources Circular. 185: 29–40.
- Nummedal, Dag; Molenaar, C.M. (1995). "Sequence stratigraphy of ramp-setting strand plain successions; the Gallup Sandstone, New Mexico". American Association of Petroleum Geologists Memoir. 64: 277–310.
- Pierce, W.G. (1997). "Geologic map of the Cody 1 degree x 2 degrees quadrangle, northwestern Wyoming". U.S. Geological Survey Miscellaneous Geologic Investigations Map. I-2500.
- Roehler, H.W. (1987). "Surface-subsurface correlations of the Mesaverde Group and associated upper Cretaceous formations, Rock Springs, Wyoming, to Mount Harris, Colorado". U.S. Geological Survey Miscellaneous Field Studies Map. MF-1937. doi:10.3133/mf1937.
- Sears, J.D. (1925). "Geology and coal resources of the Gallup-Zuni basin, New Mexico". U.S. Geological Survey Bulletin (767).
- Spieker, E. M.; Reeside, J. B. (30 September 1925). "Cretaceous and Tertiary Formations of the Wasatch Plateau, Utah". Geological Society of America Bulletin. 36 (3): 435–454. Bibcode:1925GSAB...36..435S. doi:10.1130/GSAB-36-435.
- Wahl, W.; Hogbin, J. (2003). "Deinosuchus material from the Mesaverde Formation of Wyoming: filling in a gap". Journal of Vertebrate Paleontology. 23: 107A.
- Weishampel, David B.; Dodson, Peter; Osmólska, Halszka, eds. (2004). The Dinosauria (2nd ed.). Berkeley: University of California Press. ISBN 0-520-24209-2.
