= Cliff House Sandstone =

Geologic formation in the western US

- Stratigraphic range: Late Campanian; ~75 Ma
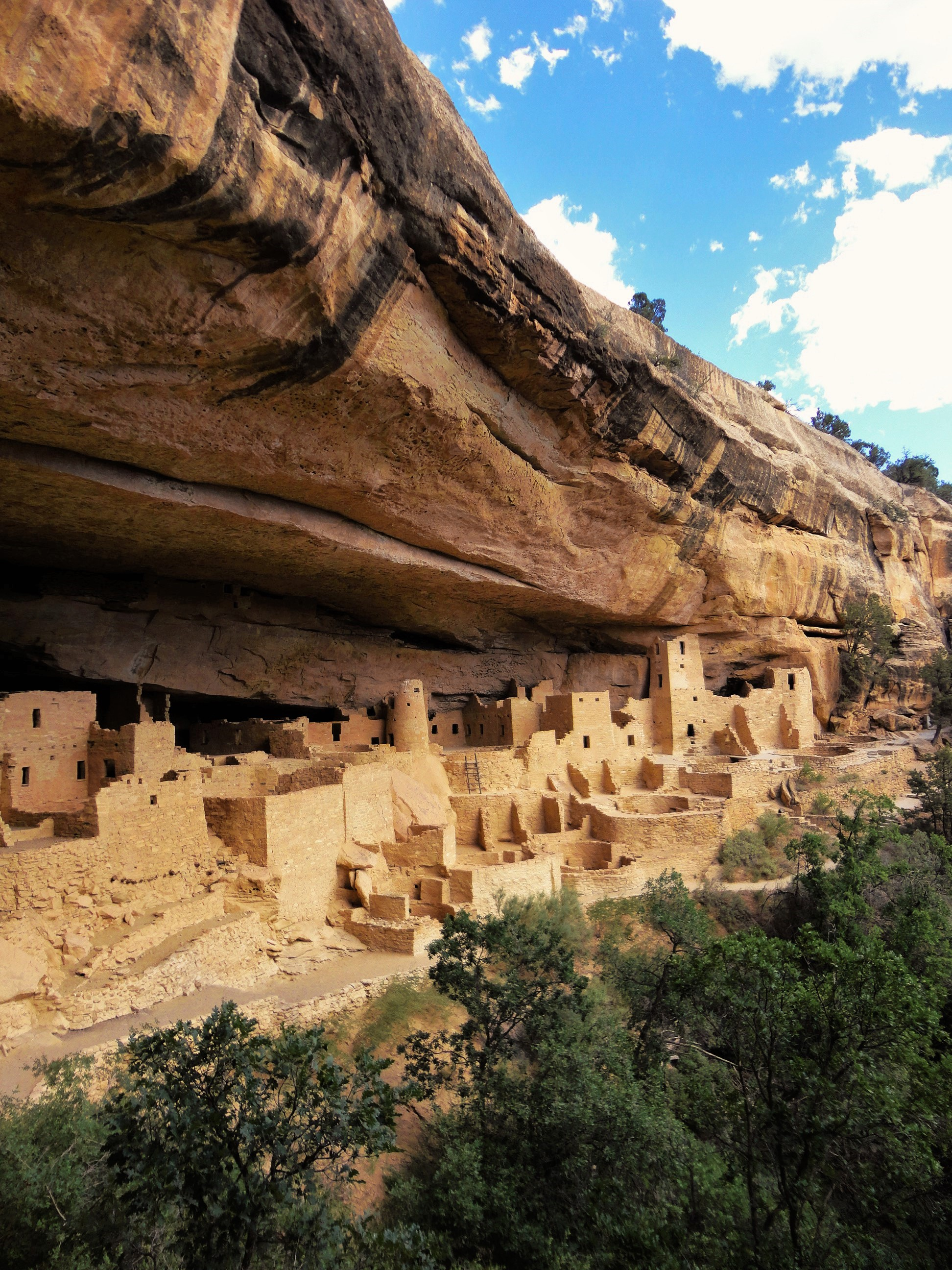
- Cliff House Sandstone at Cliff House, Mesa Verde National Park
- Type: Formation
- Unit of: Mesaverde Group
- Sub-units: Barker Dome Tongue, Beechatuda Tongue, Chacra Tongue, Cholla Canyon Tongue, La Ventana Tongue, Ute Canyon Tongue
- Underlies: Lewis Shale
- Overlies: Menefee Formation
- Thickness: 300 m (980 ft)

Lithology
- Primary: Sandstone

Location
- Coordinates: 37.167°N 108.473°W
- Region: Colorado
- Country: United States
- Extent: Mesa Verde National Park, San Juan Basin

Type section
- Named for: Cliff House, Mesa Verde National Park
- Named by: A.J. Collier
- Year defined: 1919

The Cliff House Sandstone is a late Campanian stratigraphic unit comprising sandstones in the western United States.

== Description ==
The Cliff House Sandstone consists of fine grained white to orange calcareous sandstone. It intertongues with the underlying Menefee Formation and the overlying Lewis Shale. Where the Lewis Shale pinches out in the southwest San Juan Basin, the formation is indistinguishable from the Pictured Cliffs Formation and the name "Pictured Cliffs" is applied to the entire sequence of massive sandstone.

The formation is exposed at Mesa Verde National Park, where it forms the prominent cliffs around Cliff House, for which it is named. It is also prominent at Chaco Canyon.

At Chaco Canyon, the formation can be divided into three informal members. These are a lower massive marine sandstone deposited in a high-energy environment; a middle unit deposited in deeper water that contains some shale beds; and an upper sandstone deposited in a beach and bar environment.

The formation is part of the Mesaverde Group of the San Juan Basin, which records a regression-transgression sequence of the Western Interior Seaway. The Cliff House Sandstone was deposited during the return of the sea as near-shore sand.

== History of investigation ==
The Cliff House Sandstone was first described by W.H.Holmes in 1877 during the Hayden Survey as the "Upper Escarpment" of the Mesaverde Formation. A.J. Collier redesignated this unit in 1919 as the Cliff House Sandstone and raised the Mesaverde Formation to group rank.

== Stratigraphy ==
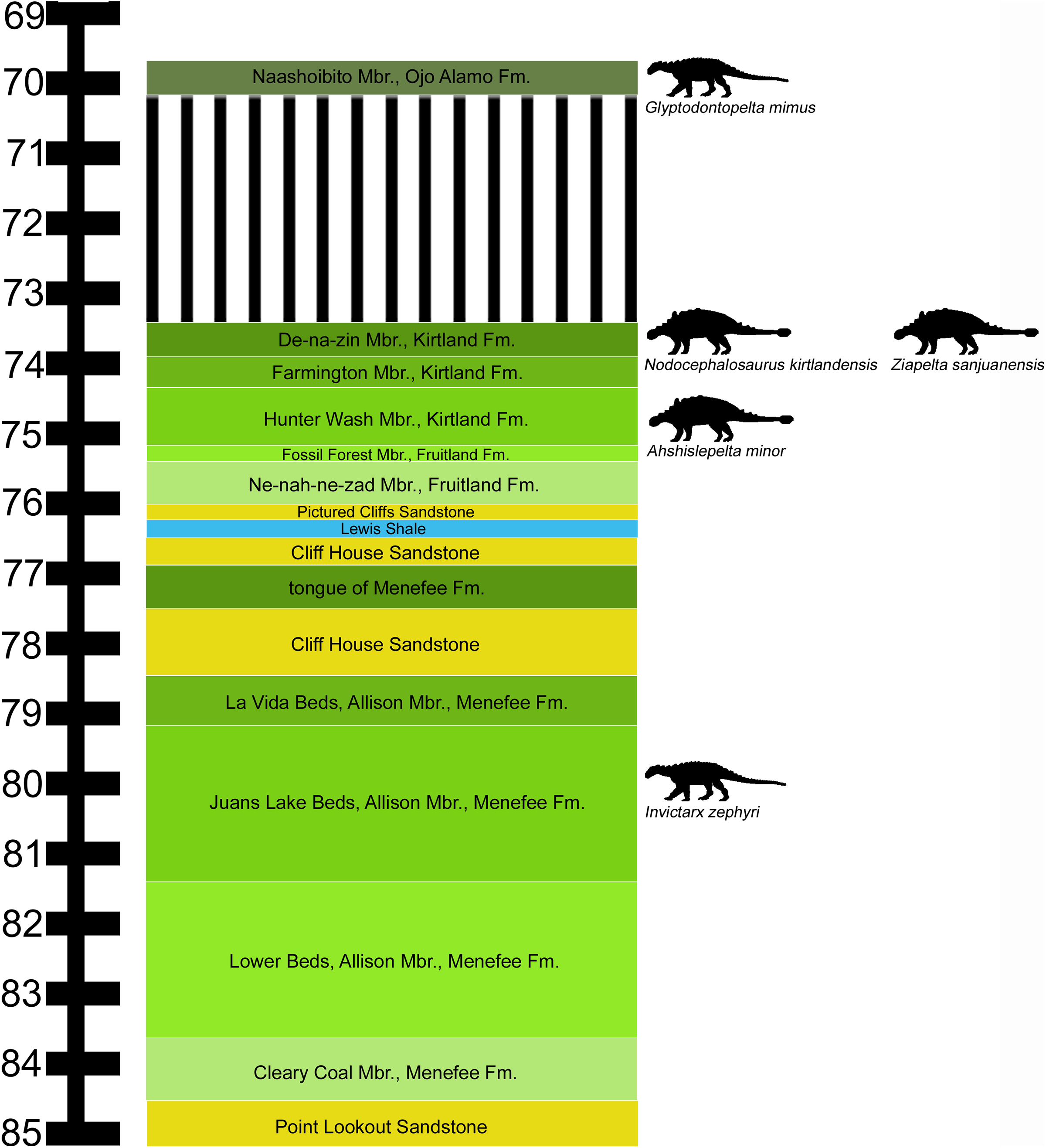
Upper Cretaceous stratigraphy of the San Juan Basin

== Fossil content ==
Outcrops of the formation in Mesa Verde National Park have produced fossil shark teeth, along with the jaws, teeth and fins of Enchodus and Chimaeroid (cartilaginous fish) egg cases. The latter have not yet been connected to a particular species of fish.

At Chaco Canyon, the lower beds produce shells and casts from clams, ammonites (including possible Placenticeras), snails, and shark's teeth. Trace fossils classified as Ophiomorpha nodosa are common and are thought to have been produced by Callianasa shrimp. The middle unit hyas fewer trace fossils but more Inoceramus, while the upper beds are rich in invertebrate shells, shark teeth, and bone debris from marine lizards.
