= Point Lookout Sandstone =

Geological formation in New Mexico and Colorado

- Stratigraphic range: Upper Cretaceous
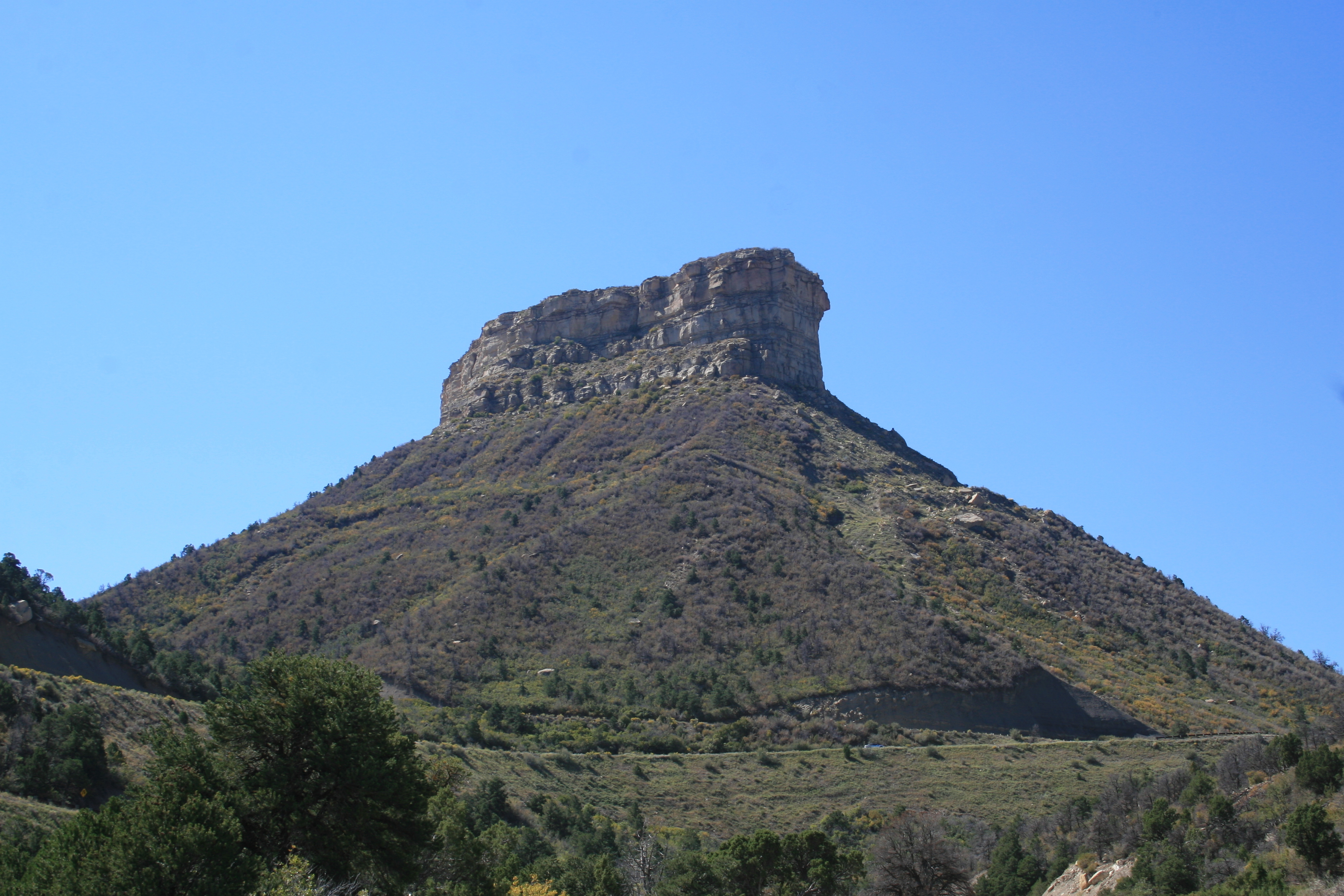
- Point Lookout, Mesa Verde National Park
- Type: Formation
- Unit of: Mesaverde Group
- Sub-units: Hosta Tongue
- Underlies: Menefee Formation
- Overlies: Crevasse Canyon Formation
- Thickness: 300 ft (91 m)

Lithology
- Primary: Sandstone
- Other: Shale

Location
- Coordinates: 37.316°N 108.419°W
- Region: Paradox Basin, San Juan Basin
- Country: United States

Type section
- Named for: Point Lookout
- Named by: A. J. Collier
- Year defined: 1919
- Point Lookout Sandstone (the United States) Point Lookout Sandstone (Colorado)

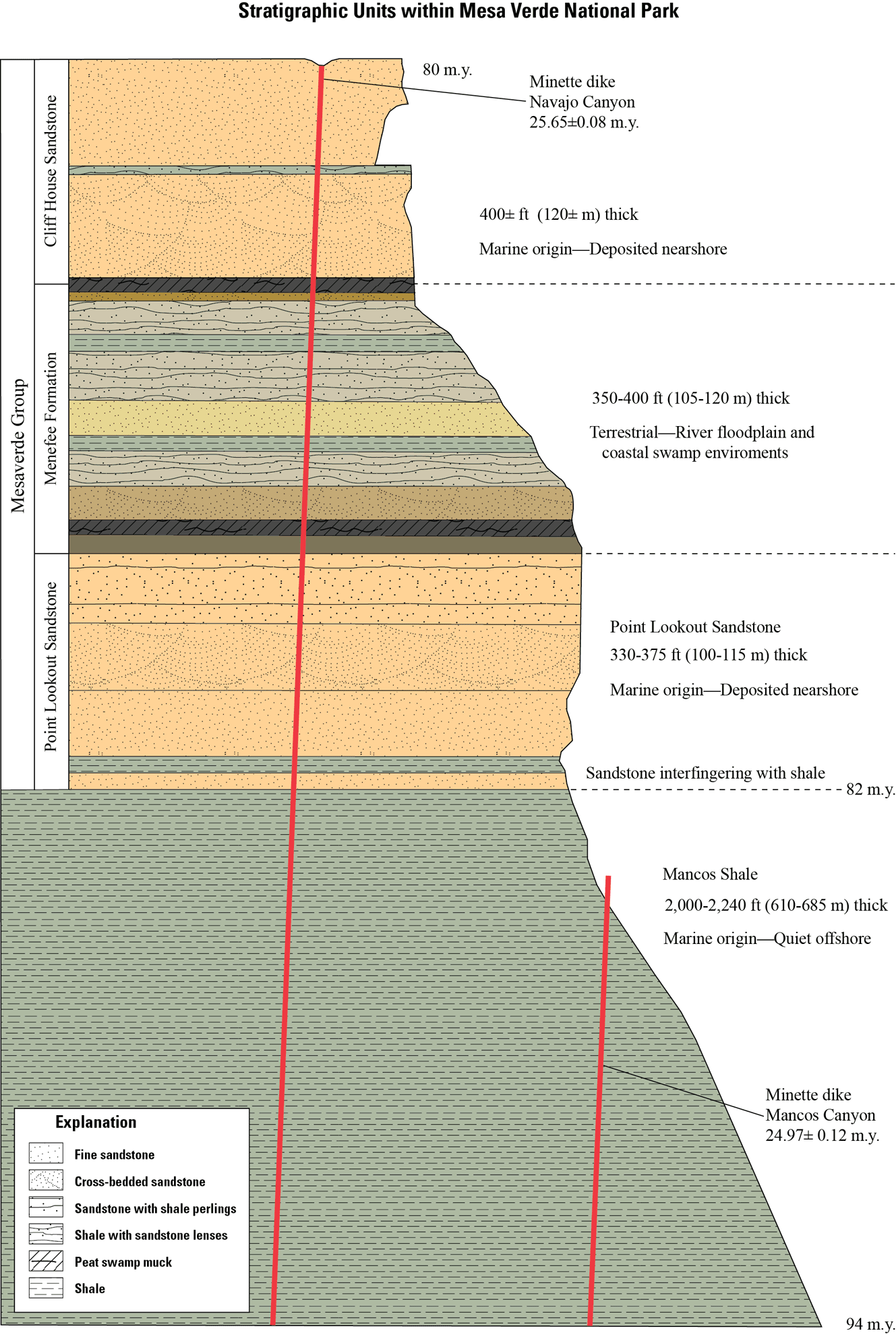
Stratigraphic section of formations exposed at the surface, Mesa Verde National Park, Colorado (USGS).

The Point Lookout Sandstone is a Cretaceous bedrock formation occurring in New Mexico and Colorado.

== Description ==
The formation consists of two informal members. The lower is a sequence of thinly bedded sandstone and shale, while the upper is a massive medium- to fine-grained cross-bedded sandstone, light gray to buff in color, that is a conspicuous cliff-forming unit. Maximum thickness is 131 meters (430 feet).

The lower contact is placed at the first thin sandstone bed above the shale of the Mancos Shale. The formation is overlain by the Menefee Formation.

The Point Lookout Sandstone was deposited in the Cretaceous Interior Seaway, as part of a regressive sequence as the seaway was receding. It is transitional between the marine environment of the underlying Mancos and the coastal plain environment of the overlying Menefee Formation.

== Fossils ==
Dinosaur remains are among the fossils that have been recovered from the formation, including a well preserved maniraptoran feather, although none have yet been referred to a specific genus.

The ammonite Clioscaphites vermiformis was identified in the formation.

== Resource geology ==
Exposures of the Point Lookout Sandstone at Apache Mesa in New Mexico contain heavy mineral deposits, rich in titanium, zirconium, rare earth elements, and other valuable metals. However, the deposits are much too small to be economical to mine as of 2021. The deposits represent a beach placer deposit similar to ones seen in the southeastern U.S. Atlantic coast, southeastern Australia, and India.

== History of investigation ==
The sandstone was first described by A. J. Collier for exposures in cliffs at Point Lookout, in Mesa Verde National Park, Montezuma County, Colorado, in the Paradox Basin, and later described by Allen and Balk in 1954 as part of the Mesaverde Group in the San Juan Basin in New Mexico.

== See also ==
- List of dinosaur-bearing rock formations
  - List of stratigraphic units with indeterminate dinosaur fossils
