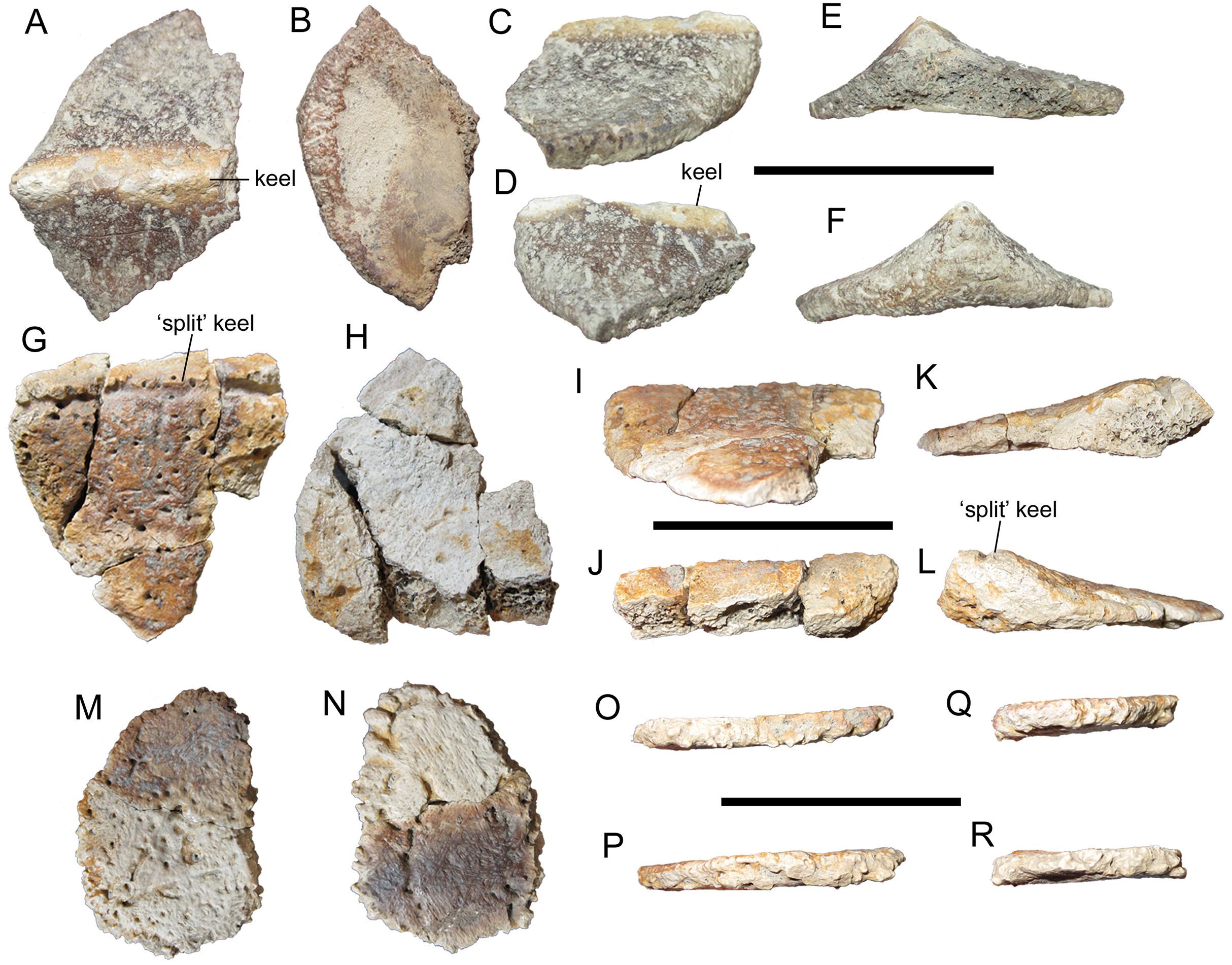
- Thoracic osteoderms of Invitarx zephyri (part of the holotype)

Scientific classification
- Kingdom: Animalia
- Phylum: Chordata
- Class: Reptilia
- Clade: Dinosauria
- Clade: †Ornithischia
- Clade: †Thyreophora
- Clade: †Ankylosauria
- Family: †Nodosauridae
- Genus: †Invictarx; McDonald and Wolfe, 2018

Type species
- †Invictarx zephyri McDonald and Wolfe, 2018

= Invictarx =

Invictarx Temporal range: Late Cretaceous, 78.5 Ma

Extinct genus of dinosaurs

Invictarx (meaning "unconquerable fortress") is a monospecific genus of nodosaurid dinosaur from New Mexico that lived during the Late Cretaceous (lower Campanian, 78.5 Ma) in what is now the upper Allison Member of the Menefee Formation. The type and only species, Invictarx zephyri, is known from three isolated, incomplete postcranial skeletons. It was named in 2018 by Andrew T. McDonald and Douglas G. Wolfe. Invictarx shares similarities with Glyptodontopelta from the Naashoibito member of the Ojo Alamo Formation, New Mexico.

== Discovery and naming ==
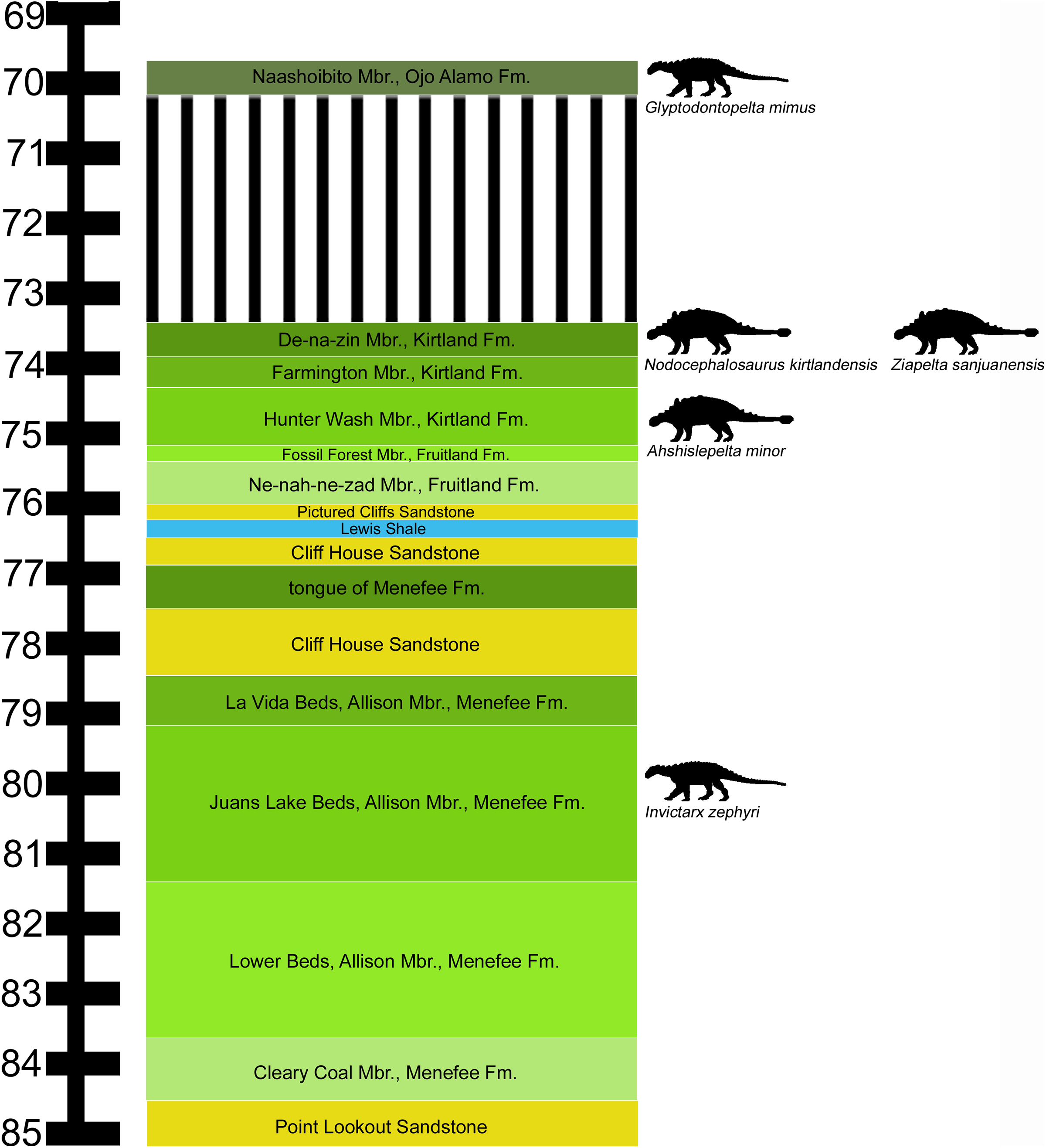
Stratigraphic occurrences of Invictarx and other ankylosaurs from New Mexico.

In May 2011, an incomplete postcranial skeleton of an ankylosaur was discovered from the upper Allison Member of the Menefee Formation, San Juan Basin by Daniel Williamson. A second incomplete postcranial skeleton was discovered in October 2011 by Andrew T. McDonald while a third specimen was discovered in October 2015 by Keith Brockmann. The specimens were subsequently named and described in 2018 by Andrew T. McDonald and Douglas G. Wolfe.

The holotype specimen, WSC 16505, consists of fragments of a dorsal rib, complete or partial identifiable osteoderms, and fragments of additional osteoderms. Two other specimens were referred to Invictarx: UMNH VP 28350, dorsal vertebrae, fragments of dorsal ribs, distal end of humerus, distal end of ulna, proximal ends of radii, incomplete metacarpal, numerous incomplete osteoderms, and fragments of additional osteoderms; and UMNH VP 28351, dorsal centra, fragments of dorsal ribs, numerous incomplete osteoderms, and fragments of additional osteoderms. The three specimens are housed at the Western Science Center, California and Natural History Museum of Utah, Salt Lake City, Utah.

The generic name, Invictarx, is derived from the Latin words "invictus" (invincible or unconquerable) and "arx" (fortress), in reference to the fact that Invictarx, like all other ankylosaurs, were well-armoured. The specific name, zephyri, is derived from is the genitive form of the Greek noun Zephyrus, meaning (of the) western wind, referring to the "blustery conditions that prevail among the outcrops where the specimens were discovered".

== Description ==
=== Distinguishing traits ===
McDonald & Wolfe (2018) diagnosed Invictarx based on the cervical or pectoral, thoracic, and pelvic osteoderms exhibiting an overall smooth surface texture, with little to no projecting rugosity, with abundant pits distributed randomly over the entire external surface, and with no neurovascular grooves or a small number of bifurcating and non-bifurcating neurovascular grooves distributed randomly, a feature similar to Glyptodontopelta; thoracic osteoderms exhibit a low, rounded keel with a deep groove extending craniocaudally along the apex, similar to Anodontosaurus and Platypelta; and the presence of possible a co-ossified pelvic shield that consists of polygonal osteoderms of uniform size, similar to Nodosaurus, Stegopelta, Glyptodontopelta, Europelta and Aletopelta.

=== Postcrania ===
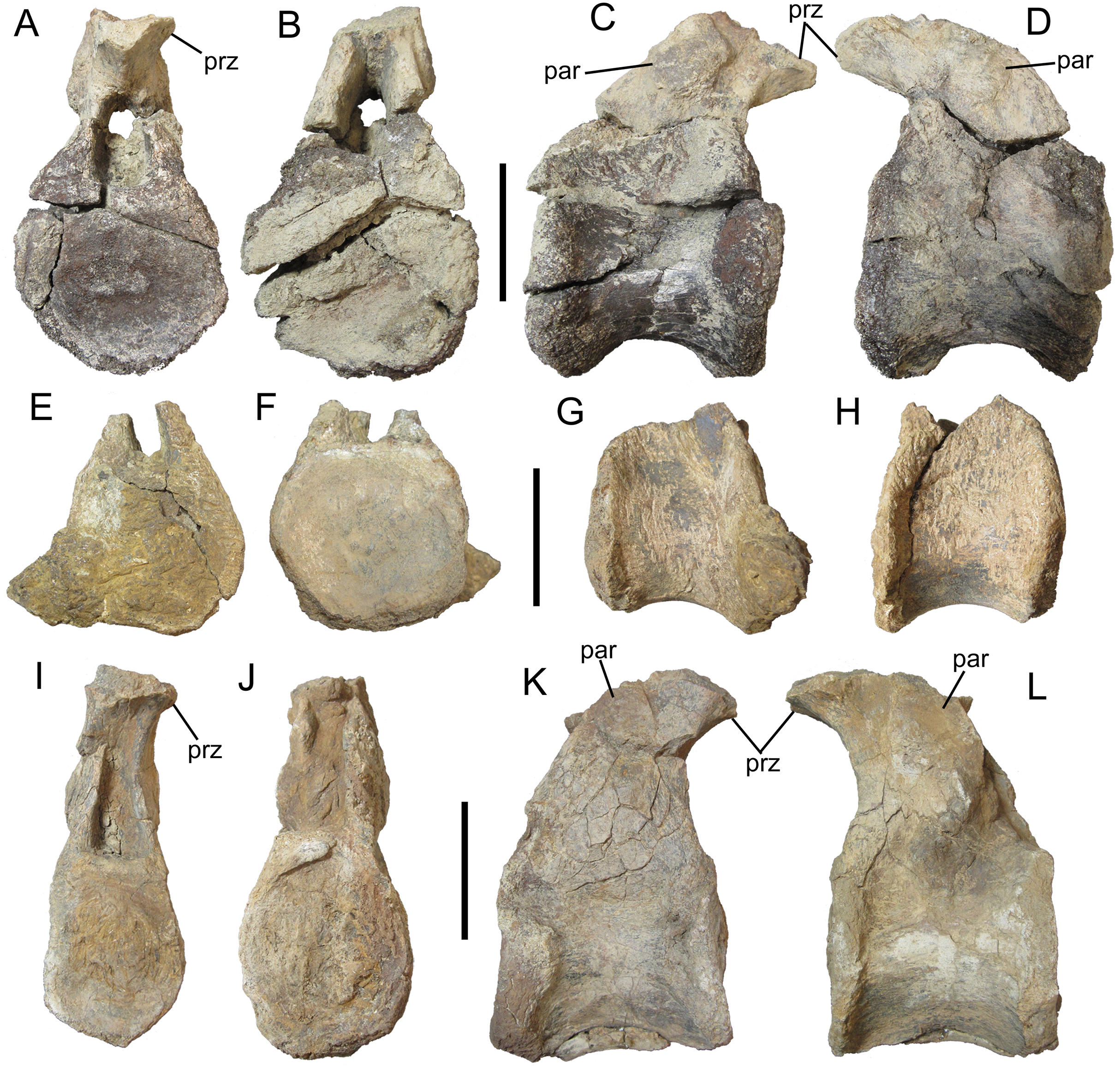
Dorsal vertebrae of referred specimen.

The dorsal vertebrae are incomplete but well-preserved, as one vertebra consists of the centrum while the other two vertebrae preserve the base of the neural arch and partial prezygapophyses. Based on Sauropelta and Europelta, the vertebrae are identified as middle dorsal vertebrae, although there are no indications of ribs fused to the three dorsal vertebrae. The dorsal vertebrae have the cranial and caudal faces only slightly concave. Both the cranial and caudal surfaces are sub circular. The neural arch forms a right angle with the long axis of the centrum as it rises vertically from the craniodorsal margin of the centrum. The vertebrae possess parapophyses that are distinct and are rugose swellings on the sides of the neural arch. The prezygapophyses are joined towards the underside and form a short parapet on the neural arch. As in the nodosaurids Sauropelta, Europelta, Silvisaurus and Struthiosaurus austriacus, the neural canal is ellipse-shaped with its axis oriented towards the upper edge and sides.

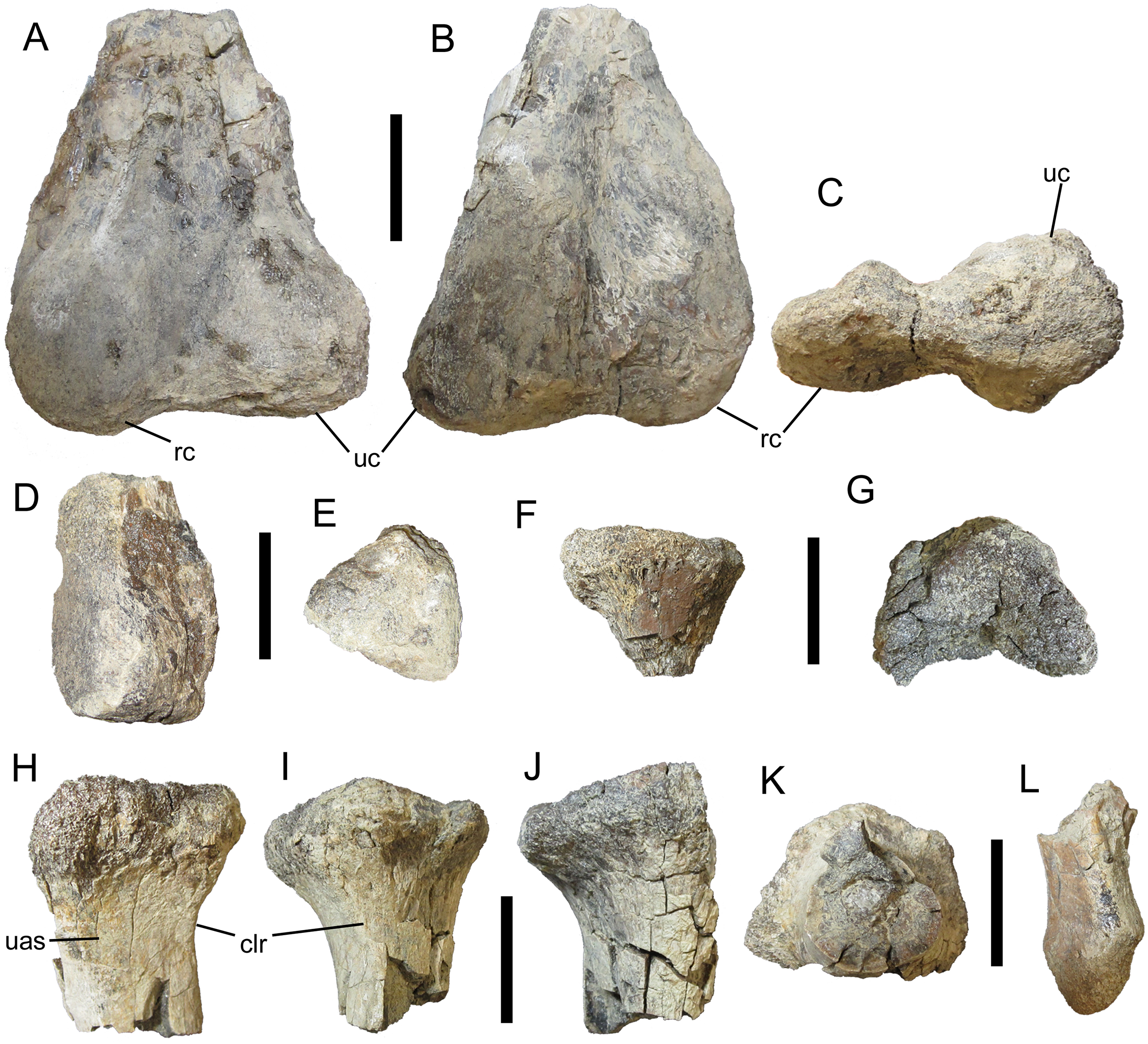
Limb elements of referred specimen.

All of the appendicular elements are incomplete and poorly preserved. Although the distal end of the left humerus is crushed, the ulnar condyle was larger than the radial condyle. As in other nodosaurids, the radial condyle was sub spherical shaped and matches the circular shape of the proximal end of the radius. The distal end of the ulna is broken and in poor condition. The distal ends of the ulnae resemble those of Sauropelta and Niobrarasaurus. The left radius consist of only a fragment while the right radius is more complete. The fragment of the left radius reveals little about the element's morphology. The proximal articulation surface of the radii are shallowly concave and circular. In cross-section, the shaft of the radii are sub circular. The sides of the shaft of the radius forms an almost flat surface to articulate with the ulna. A metacarpal assigned to one of the referred specimens lacks the proximal and distal ends, and the morphology, orientation, and placement of the metacarpal is unknown.

=== Osteoderms ===
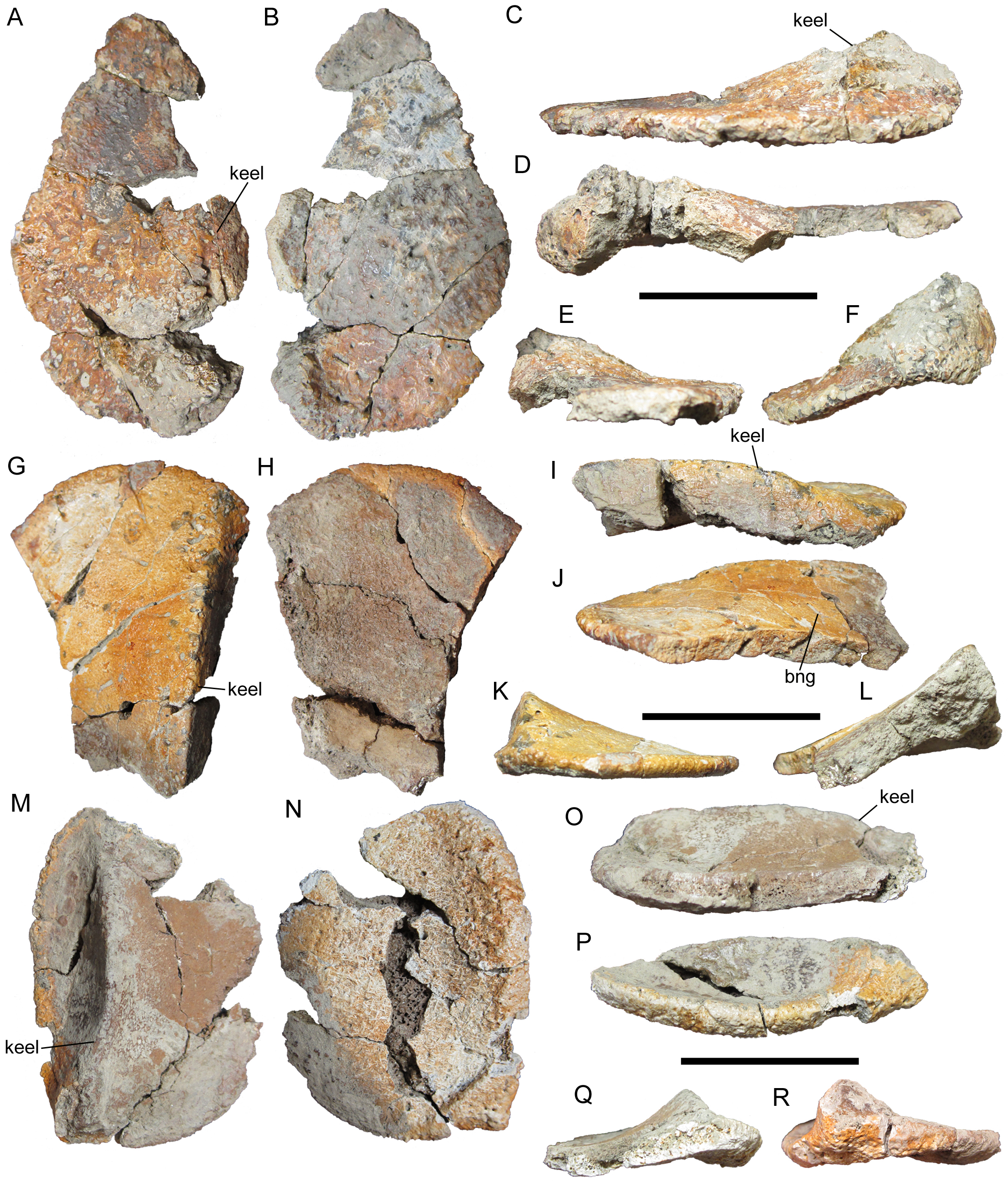
Cervical/pectoral osteoderms of holotype specimen.

One of the osteoderms associated with the holotype specimen is identified as a possible right medial pectoral or cervical osteoderm with a medial margin based on the medial pectoral osteoderms of Edmontonia, Panoplosaurus and Glyptodontopelta. The osteoderm is broken along the cranial and side margins, and pertains a rectangular or subrectangular shape. The cervical or pectoral osteoderm preserves margins that are rugose and small projecting bumps with abundant neurovascular pits. The osteoderm is 1.8 cm thick and gradually thins towards the margins where it attains a thickness of 0.6 cm. The basal surface of the osteoderm has visible structural fibres and has an abrupt transition from pitted and rugose to pitted and smooth texture. Another osteoderm referred to the holotype was identified as being a cervical or pectoral osteoderm based on Glyptodontopelta as both possess a straight, sharp keel that is dorsally convex toward its cranial end. The osteoderm possesses a cranial that is gently convex as in Glyptodontopelta. The keel of the osteoderm has a thickness of 2.2 cm and thins to only 0.6 cm. Both of the pectoral osteoderms that are assigned to the holotype have a smooth external surface with no rugosity and numerous, randomly distributed, small pits, although one of the osteoderms larger pits that are present along the apex of the keel while the other has minuscule, smaller pits. An osteoderm from the left side of the second cervical half-ring was also identified from the holotype specimen and is nearly complete. The cervical half-ring osteoderm is more oval in shape than the other osteoderms. The osteoderm has a keel that is strongly laterally offset, as in Edmontonia. Two fragments referred to UMNH VP 28350 were identified as being partial components of the cervical or pectoral half-rings. One of the fragments probably represents the middle or side margin of a broad, rounded plate, while the other fragment is a semi-circular piece. The texture of the fragments are consistent with the texture of the osteoderms referred to the holotype specimen. The osteoderm lacks a keel and resembles the portion of one of the cervical or pectoral osteoderms assigned to the holotype, which suggests that the osteoderm is also a distal osteoderm of the second cervical half-ring. A broad, thick plate assigned to UMNH VP 28351 likely pertains to one of the cervical/pectoral half-rings. The caudal margin of the osteoderm comes to a rounded protrusion, which is also present in Panoplosaurus, Edmontonia and Glyptodontopelta. The osteoderm preserves short, non-branching grooves on patches of surface texture. Another pectoral or cervical osteoderm referred to UMNH VP 28351 is unlike any of the osteoderms referred to Invictarx. The osteoderm is broken on all sides and is covered in siderite, which obscures the external surface texture. The morphology of the osteoderm is similar to the bases of the cervical/pectoral and thoracic spines of Edmontonia.

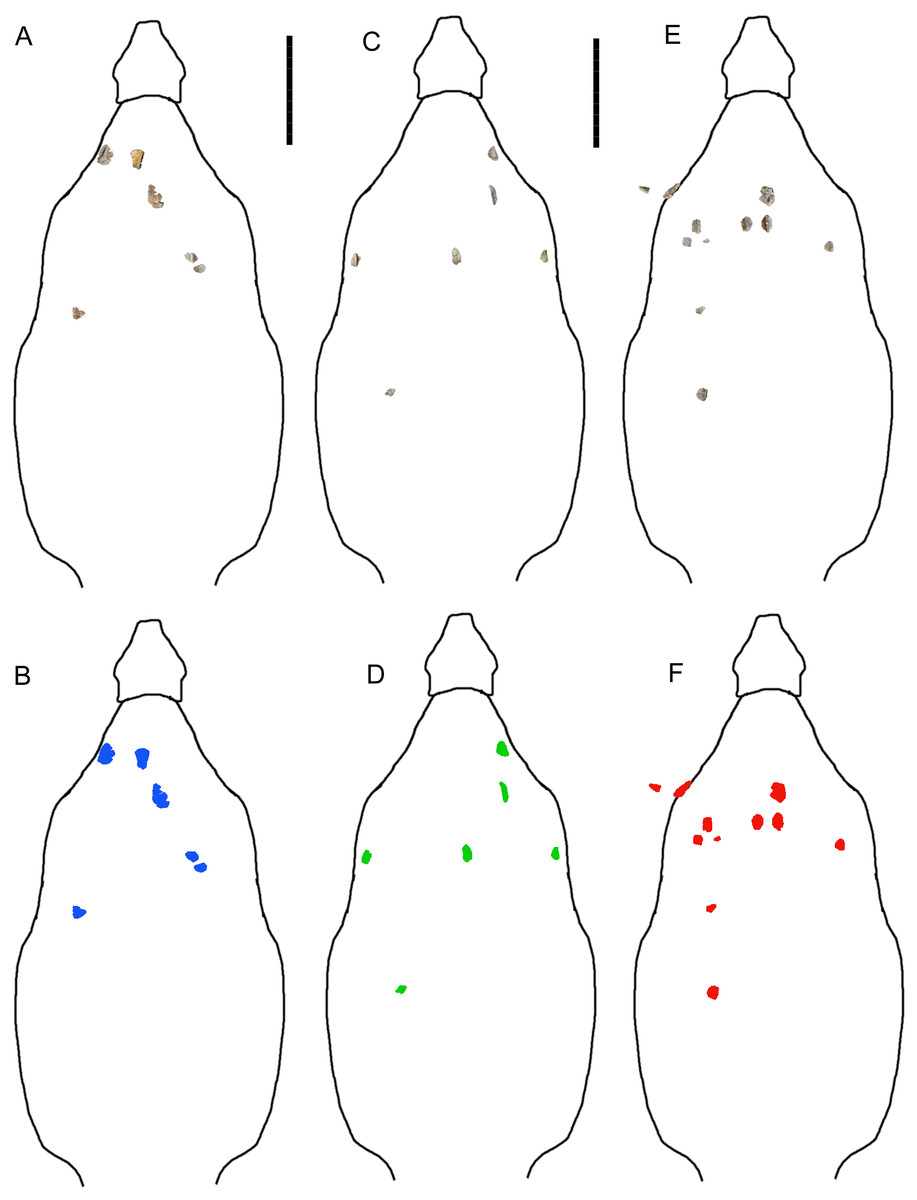
Osteoderm arrangement of Invictarx

One of the thoracic osteoderms referred to the holotype has a moderately rugose caudal margin and the offset of the keel indicates that the osteoderm was positioned on the sides. The surface texture of the thoracic osteoderms is consistent with the cervical and pectoral osteoderms. Another thoracic osteoderm is similar in shape but has a low, rounded, and poorly defined keel. The thoracic osteoderm has a "split" morphology, with a deep, sharply defined groove extending craniocaudally along the apex of the keel which differs the osteoderm from those of other nodosaurids. This osteoderms, along with another thoracic osteoderms assigned to one of the referred specimens, has a smooth, copiously pitted external surface texture that continues uninterrupted into a groove, which is also seen in Anodontosaurus and Platypelta. The osteoderms shows a similar surface texture to the other osteoderms in the holotype specimen. The most complete thoracic osteoderm is small compared to the other osteoderms referred to the holotype and is only 5.1 cm wide. An osteoderm referred to UMNH VP 28350 was probably located near the midline of Invictarx based on the apparent symmetry and may have been a craniocaudally elongate element as osteoderms referred to Europelta. Two partial osteoderms referred to the same specimen were positioned towards the sides in life based on the offset keels and pronounces keels that make the cross-sections shaped like scalene triangles. UMNH VP 28351 preserves four morphotypes of thoracic osteoderms and are also represented among the osteoderms of the holotype specimen and UMNH VP 28350. The first morphotype includes two partial osteoderms that are very thick with flat bases and sharp, prominent midline keels. The two osteoderms would have been situated near the midline of Invictarx based on the midline positions of the keels. The second morphotype consists of more laterally positioned osteoderms with offset keels and are the most abundant class of osteoderm in UMNH VP 28351. The third morphotype includes one osteoderm which exhibits a deep groove extending craniocaudally along the apex of the keel. The osteoderm is similar to a thoracic osteoderm referred to the holotype and both share nearly flat bases, smooth external surface texture with numerous pits, and a low, rounded keel. The fourth morphotype is represented by numerous flat, thin osteoderms that have highly rugose margins.

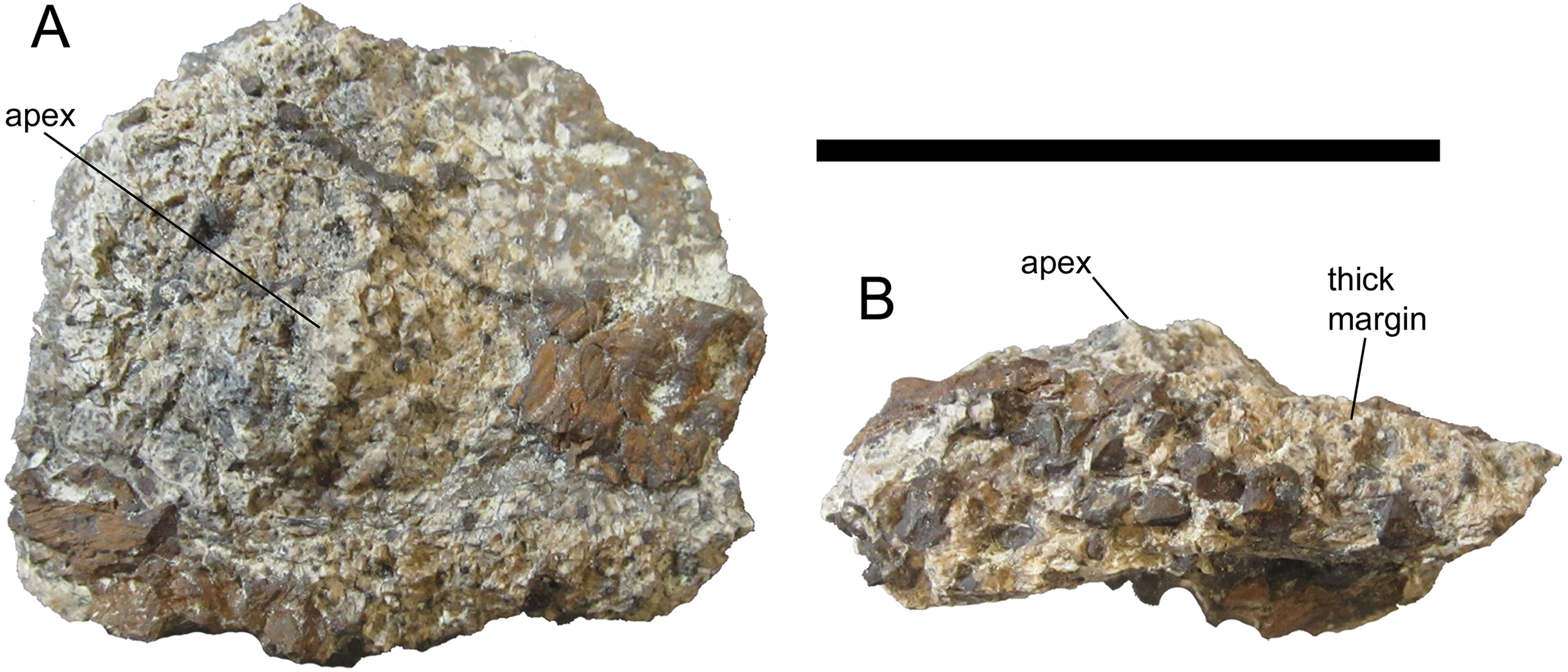
Pelvic osteoderm of referred specimen.

Two fragments from the pelvic region assigned to UMNH VP 28350 have a flat external and basal surfaces with small pits. The fragments do not become thinner toward the margins and, instead, has a constant thickness. Compared to the margins of the cervical or pectoral and thoracic osteoderms, the pelvic osteoderm fragments have extremely thick margins. The osteoderm fragments are similar in morphology to the pelvic osteoderms of Glyptodontopelta based on the flat external and basal surfaces, and thick, non-tapering margins. An incomplete osteoderm belonging to UMNH VP 28351 is similar to the polygonal osteoderms that comprise the pelvic shield of Aletopelta and some nodosaurids. As in UMNH VP 28350, the pelvic osteoderm referred to UMNH VP 28351 bears a close resemblance to the pelvic osteoderms of Glyptodontopelta. Invictarx likely had a pelvic shield consisting of co-ossified polygonal osteoderms based on the similarities with the osteoderms of Stegopelta and Glyptodontopelta.

== Paleoenvironment ==
Invictarx is known from the upper Allison Member of the Menefee Formation which has been dated to the lower Campanian stage, 78.5 Ma. The Menefee Formation represents a widespread alluvial floodplain and consists of mudstone, siltstone, sandstone, and coal. The sandstones that comprises the Menefee Formation that are fixed within carbonaceous shales of coastal swamp or lagoon origin and are thought to have been created by flood tidal deltas that north and east across New Mexico and towards the retreating Western Interior Seaway.

Invictarx was contemporaneous with an indeterminate ankylosaur, the tyrannosaurid theropod Dynamoterror, an indeterminate hadrosaurid, the centrosaurine ceratopsid Menefeeceratops, the brachylophosaurin hadrosaurid Ornatops, an indeterminate tyrannosaurid, and a dromaeosaurid similar to Saurornitholestes. Non-dinosaur taxa contemporaneous with Invictarx include an indeterminate crocodylian, the alligatoroids Brachychampsa and Deinosuchus, an indeterminate baenid turtle, an indeterminate turtle, and an indeterminate trionychid turtle.

== See also ==
- 2018 in paleontology
- Timeline of ankylosaur research
