= Menefee Formation =

Geologic formation in New Mexico and Colorado

- Stratigraphic range: 84.2–79 Ma
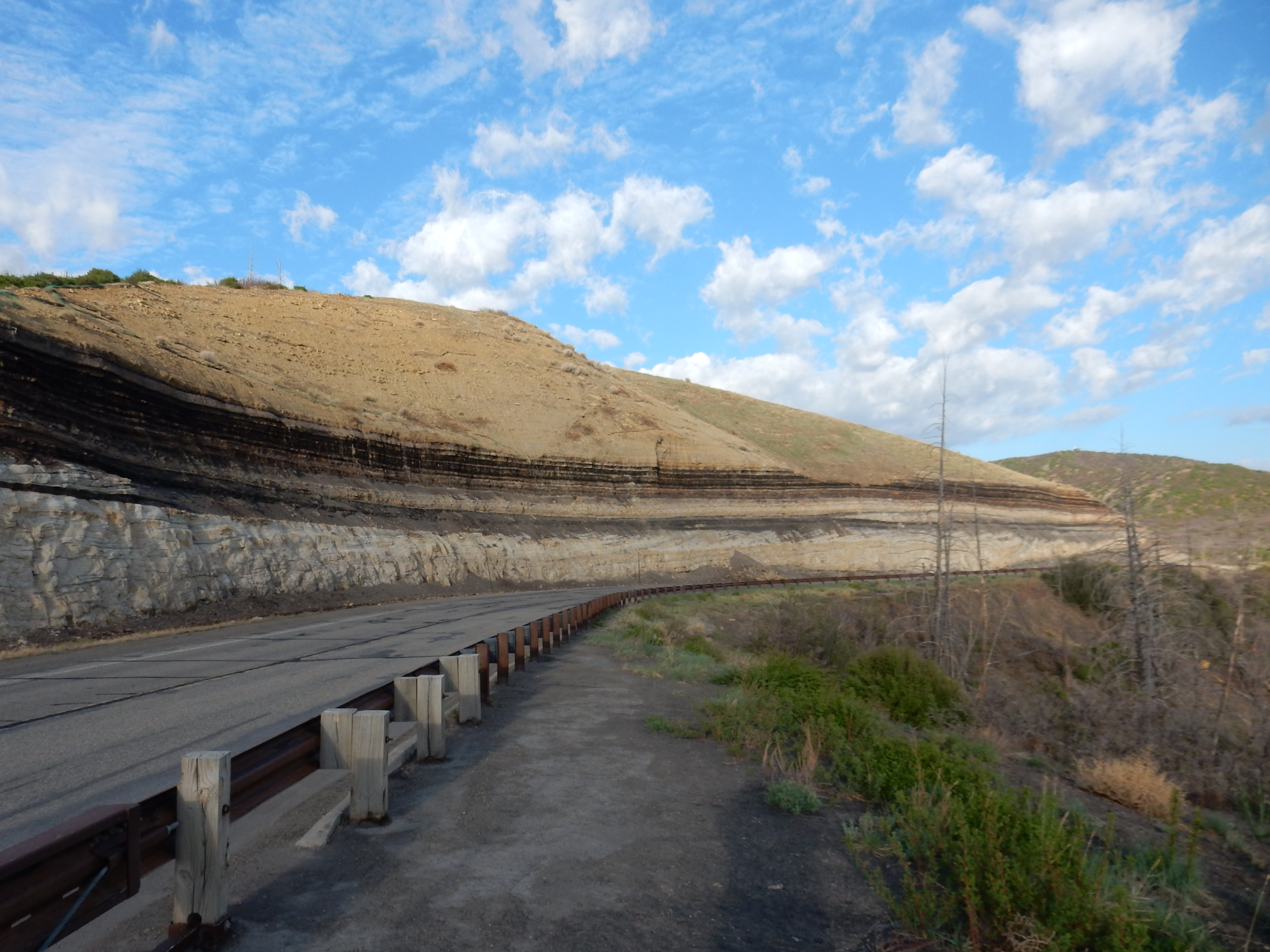
- Menefee Formation in road cut at Mesa Verde National Park, Colorado
- Type: Geological formation
- Unit of: Mesaverde Group
- Sub-units: Cleary Coal Member, Allison Member
- Underlies: Cliff House Sandstone
- Overlies: Point Lookout Sandstone
- Thickness: 500 m (1,600 ft)

Lithology
- Primary: sandstone, shale
- Other: coal<

Location
- Coordinates: 37°19′37″N 108°14′56″W
- Region: Colorado, New Mexico
- Country: United States

Type section
- Named for: Menefee Mountain (37°19′37″N 108°14′56″W)
- Named by: A.J.Collier
- Year defined: 1919
- Menefee Formation (the United States) Menefee Formation (Colorado)

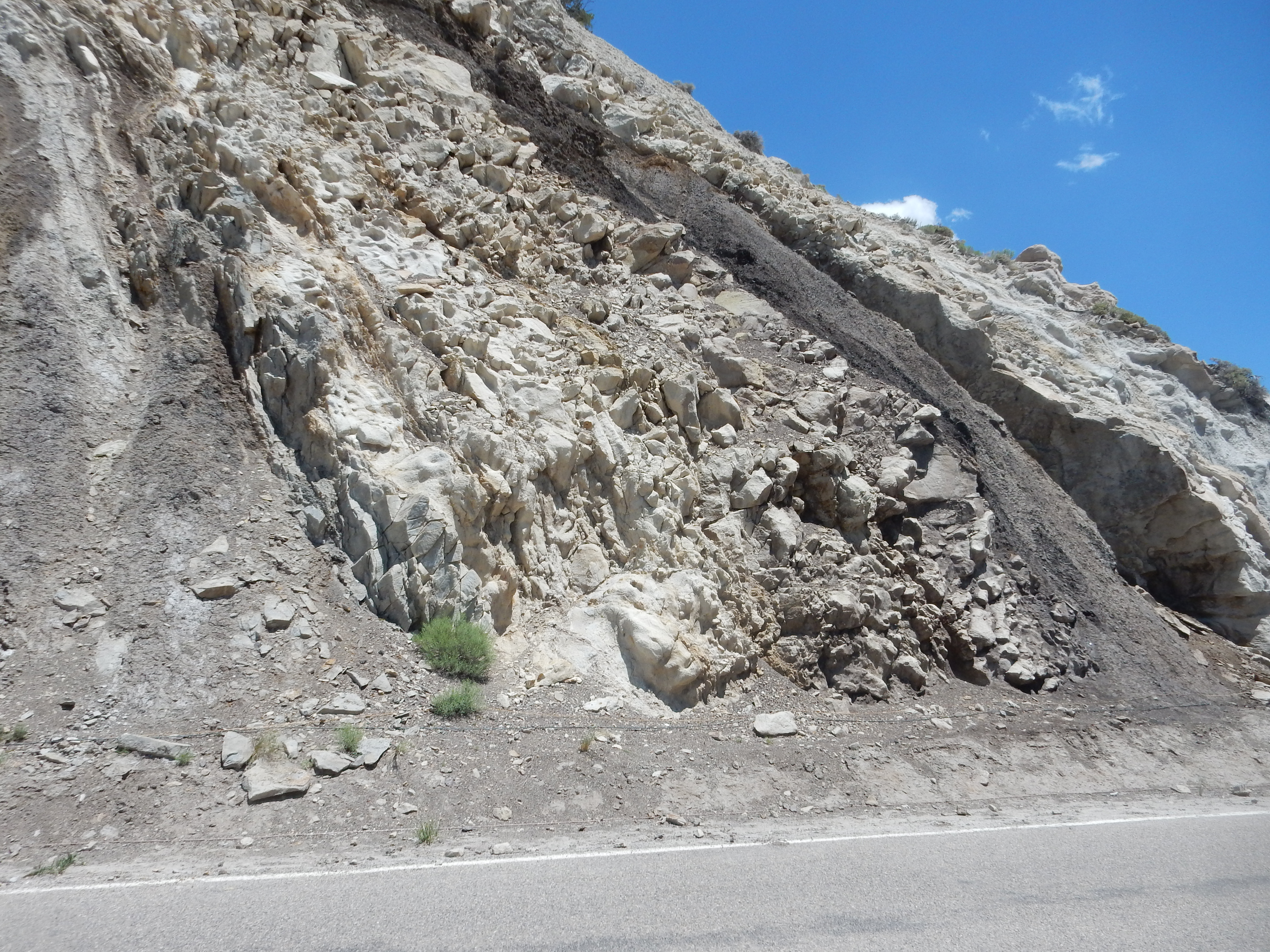
Menefee Formation in a road cut through a hogback ridge near Cuba, New Mexico

The Menefee Formation is an upper Santonian to lower Campanian geologic formation found in Colorado and New Mexico, United States.

== Description ==
The Menefee Formation consists of fluvial sandstone, shale, and coal. Based on ammonite biostratigraphy, the age of the Menefee Formation can be constrained to 84.2-79 million years (Ma), based on the presence of Baculites perplexus in the overlying Cliff House Sandstone, and ammonites from the late Santonian in the underlying Point Lookout Sandstone.

Named members include a lower Cleary Coal Member and an upper Allison Member.

The Mesaverde Group in the San Juan Basin records a marine regression-transgression sequence of the western margin of the Western Interior Seaway. The Menefee Formation was deposited at the peak of the regression as coastal river delta and swamp sediments, and includes numerous coal beds.

The formation is exposed at Chaco Canyon National Park, where many of the coal beds have been burned to produce distinctive red cinder outcrops.

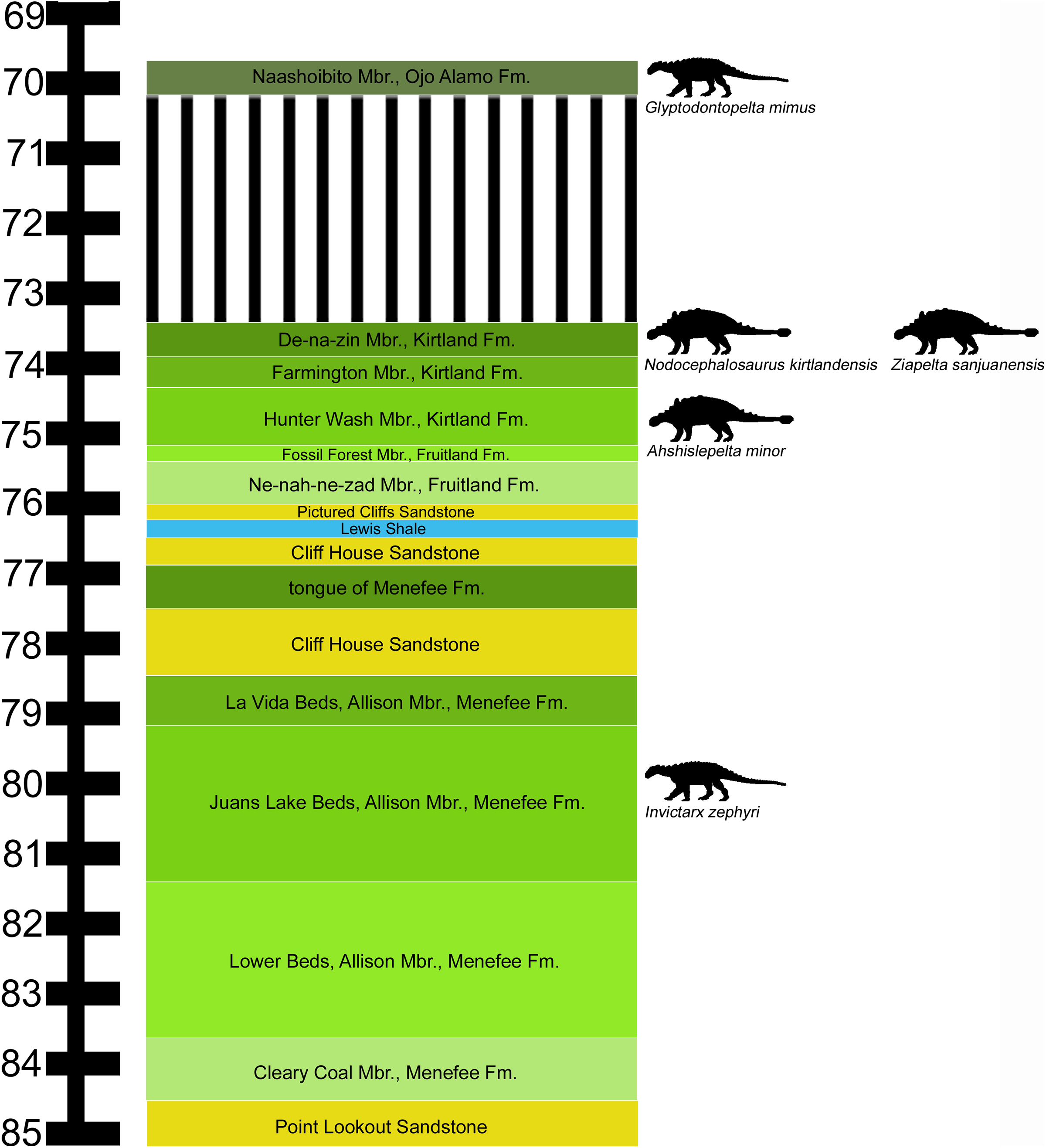
San Juan Basin Upper Cretaceous stratigraphy

== Fossils ==
The Menefee Formation includes fossils of turtles, fish and crocodiles and fragmentary evidence of hadrosaurs, ankylosaurs, and ceratopsian dinosaurs. Plant fossils include leaf impressions of palms, conifers, laurels, witchhazel, and camellia. The flora are suggestive of a moist subtropical environment.

=== Vertebrate fauna ===
Several vertebrates have been recovered from the Menefee Formation, including intermediate remains of baenids, trionychids, and dromaeosaurids.

Dinosaurs reported from the Menefee Formation
Genus	Species	Stratigraphic position	Material	Notes	Images
Ankylosauria	Indeterminate	Allison Member	Numerous partial osteoderms.	Indeterminate Ankylosaur remains.	Dynamoterror Invictarx Menefeeceratops Ornatops
Dynamoterror	D. dynastes	Allison Member	Frontals, fragmentary vertebral centra, fragments of dorsal ribs, metacarpal, supraacetabular crest of an ilium, unidentifiable fragments of long bones and phalanxes.	A tyrannosaurid tyrannosaurine known from fragmentary remains.	Dynamoterror Invictarx Menefeeceratops Ornatops
Hadrosauridae	Indeterminate	Allison Member	A proximal femur, a distal metatarsal, jaw fragments, a radius, an ulna, caudal vertebrae and a distal tibia.	Indeterminate hadrosaurid remains.	Dynamoterror Invictarx Menefeeceratops Ornatops
Invictarx	I. zephyri	Allison Member	Dorsal rib fragments, dorsal vertebrae, distal end of humerus, distal end of ulna, proximal ends of radii, incomplete metacarpal, and numerous incomplete and complete osteoderms.	A nodosaurid, similar to Glyptodontopelta from the Ojo Alamo Formation.	Dynamoterror Invictarx Menefeeceratops Ornatops
Menefeeceratops	M. sealeyi	Allison Member	A partial premaxilla, nearly complete postorbital horncore, squamosals, an incomplete parietal, jugal, predentary, dentary, a cervical vertebra, dorsal vertebrae, sacral vertebrae, dorsal ribs, ilium, radius, the proximal and distal portions of an ulna, metatarsal, femur, and the distal end of a fibula.	The oldest recognized centrosaurine ceratopsid.	Dynamoterror Invictarx Menefeeceratops Ornatops
Ornatops	O. incantatus	Allison Member	A partial premaxilla, postorbital, squamosal, quadrates, skull roof, braincase, partial dorsal vertebrae, dorsal rib, ossified tendons, scapula, proximal end of a humerus, ulna lacking the proximal end, radius lacking the proximal end, metacarpals, and incomplete pubis and ischium.	The first brachylophosaurin reported from New Mexico and the southernmost occurrence of the clade.	Dynamoterror Invictarx Menefeeceratops Ornatops
cf. Saurornitholestes	cf. S. sp	Allison Member	A fragmentary tooth.	A saurornitholestine dromaeosaurid represented by a single, isolated tooth.	Dynamoterror Invictarx Menefeeceratops Ornatops
Tyrannosauridae	Indeterminate	Allison Member	A scapula, metatarsal, shaft of anterior thoracic rib, postorbital and lateral tooth.	Indeterminate tyrannosaurid remains.	Dynamoterror Invictarx Menefeeceratops Ornatops

Crocodilians reported from the Menefee Formation
Genus	Species	Stratigraphic position	Material	Notes	Images
Crocodylia	Indeterminate	Allison Member	A jaw fragment, teeth and scutes.	Indeterminate crocodylian remains.	Brachychampsa Deinosuchus
Brachychampsa	B. sealeyi	Allison Member	A partial skull, associated partial right mandible, partial ramus of the left mandible, and a nearly complete osteoderm.	Mandible preserves bite marks which may have been inflicted by another alligatorioid.	Brachychampsa Deinosuchus
Deinosuchus	D. sp	Allison Member	[Six] osteoderms, caudal vertebrae, and a fragmentary tooth.	One of the earliest occurrences of the genus on the Laramidian continent and all of North America.	Brachychampsa Deinosuchus

Turtles reported from the Menefee Formation
Genus	Species	Stratigraphic position	Material	Notes	Images
Neurankylus	N. baueri	Allison Member	Carapace fragments and plastron fragments.	A baenid paracryptodiran.	
Testudines	Indeterminate	Allison Member	A very fragmentary partial carapace and plastron.	Indeterminate turtle remains.	
Trionychidae	Indeterminate	Allison Member	A nearly complete costal, carapace fragments and plastron fragments.	Indeterminate trionychid remains.	

== Economic geology ==
The Menefee Formation has been extensively mined for coal since the early 20th century. The Monero field in Rio Arriba County, New Mexico, was mined from the 1880s into the early 1920s to support the Denver and Rio Grande Western Railroad, but while the coal is of good quality, the coal beds are relatively thin and the terrain is rugged. Remaining reserves are around 13.5 million tons, inadequate for economic exploitation in the 21st century.

== History of investigation ==
The Menefee Formation was first described by W.H.Holmes in 1877 during the Hayden Survey as the "Middle Coal Group" of the Mesaverde Formation. A.J. Collier redesignated this unit in 1919 as the Menefee Formation and raised the Mesaverde Formation to group rank.

== See also ==
- List of dinosaur-bearing rock formations
  - List of stratigraphic units with few dinosaur genera
