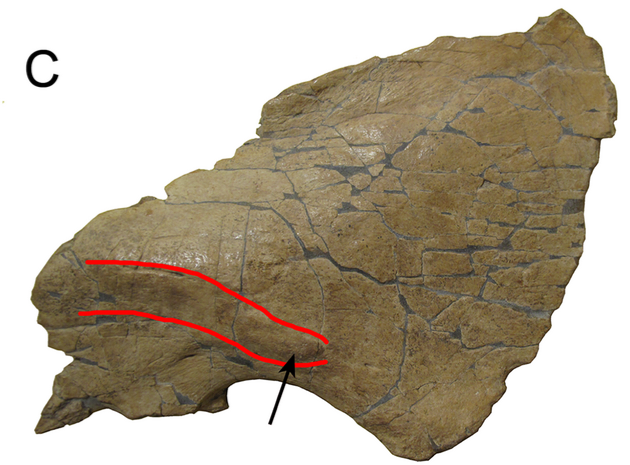
- Squamosal bone from the holotype of M. sealeyi, missing its episquamosals

Scientific classification
- Kingdom: Animalia
- Phylum: Chordata
- Class: Reptilia
- Clade: Dinosauria
- Clade: †Ornithischia
- Clade: †Ceratopsia
- Family: †Ceratopsidae
- Subfamily: †Centrosaurinae
- Genus: †Menefeeceratops; Dalman et al., 2021

Type species
- †Menefeeceratops sealeyi Dalman et al., 2021

= Menefeeceratops =

Menefeeceratops Temporal range: Campanian, 87.5–79 Ma (conservative) 83.5–80 Ma (maximum interval)

Extinct genus of dinosaurs

Menefeeceratops (meaning "Menefee Formation horned face") is a genus of ceratopsid dinosaur from the Menefee Formation in New Mexico, United States. It is potentially the oldest known member of the ceratopsids, as well as the centrosaurine subfamily, related to animals including Yehuecauhceratops and Crittendenceratops. The type and only species is Menefeeceratops sealeyi, known from a partial, non-articulated skeleton.

== Discovery and naming ==
The holotype, NMMNH P-25052, of Menefeeceratops was discovered by Paul Sealey in 1996 and later mentioned in a paper in 1997, but was not given a name until it was revisited in 2021 by Sebastian Dalman, Peter Dodson, and colleagues. The holotype was collected at the NMMNH locality 3033 in Sandoval County, New Mexico, USA, whose rocks came from the early Campanian rocks of the Allison Member of the Menefee Formation. The holotype was later collected by the New Mexico Museum of Natural History with permission of the Bureau of Land Management, who owned the land the fossils were found on, and consisted of a fragmentary skull, mandible, several fragmentary vertebrae, some ribs, the left ilium, and several fragmentary limb elements. Menefeeceratops is the only Centrosaurine described from New Mexico, while many Chasmosaurines such as Pentaceratops and Sierraceratops having been described from the late Campanian and Maastrichtian.

Menefeeceratops is named from the location where the fossils were found, and in honor of Paul Sealey, the research associate at the NMMNH who originally discovered them in 1996.

== Description ==
Size comparison

Based on comparisons with related animals including Styracosaurus, Vagaceratops, and Centrosaurus, Menefeeceratops is believed to have been approximately 4–4.5 metres (13–15 ft) long in life.

== Classification ==
- Centrosaurinae
  - - Crittendenceratops
    - Yehuecauhceratops
    - Malta ceratopsian
    - Menefeeceratops
  - - Avaceratops
    - Nasutoceratops
    - MOR 692
    - - CMN 8804
      - - Sinoceratops
        - - Wendiceratops
          - Eucentrosaura

== Paleoenvironment ==
The disarticulated holotype of Menefeeceratops was collected in a greenish-gray mudstone alongside an isolated trionychid turtle costal and fragments of fossilized woods. The Menefee Formation represents a widespread alluvial floodplain and consists of mudstone, siltstone, sandstone, and coal. The sandstones that comprise the Menefee Formation that are fixed within carbonaceous shales of coastal swamp or lagoon origin and are thought to have been created by flood tidal deltas that north and east across New Mexico and towards the retreating Western Interior Seaway.

Menefeeceratops was contemporaneous with an indeterminate ankylosaur, the nodosaurid Invictarx, an indeterminate hadrosaurid, the brachylophosaurin hadrosaurid Ornatops, the tyrannosaurid Dynamoterror, an indeterminate tyrannosaurid, and a dromaeosaurid similar to Saurornitholestes. Non-dinosaur taxa contemporaneous with Menefeeceratops include an indeterminate crocodylian, the alligatoroids Brachychampsa and Deinosuchus, an indeterminate baenid turtle, an indeterminate turtle, and an indeterminate trionychid turtle.

== See also ==
- Timeline of ceratopsian research
