= Meeteetse Formation =

Geologic formation in Wyoming, United States

- Stratigraphic range: Late Cretaceous
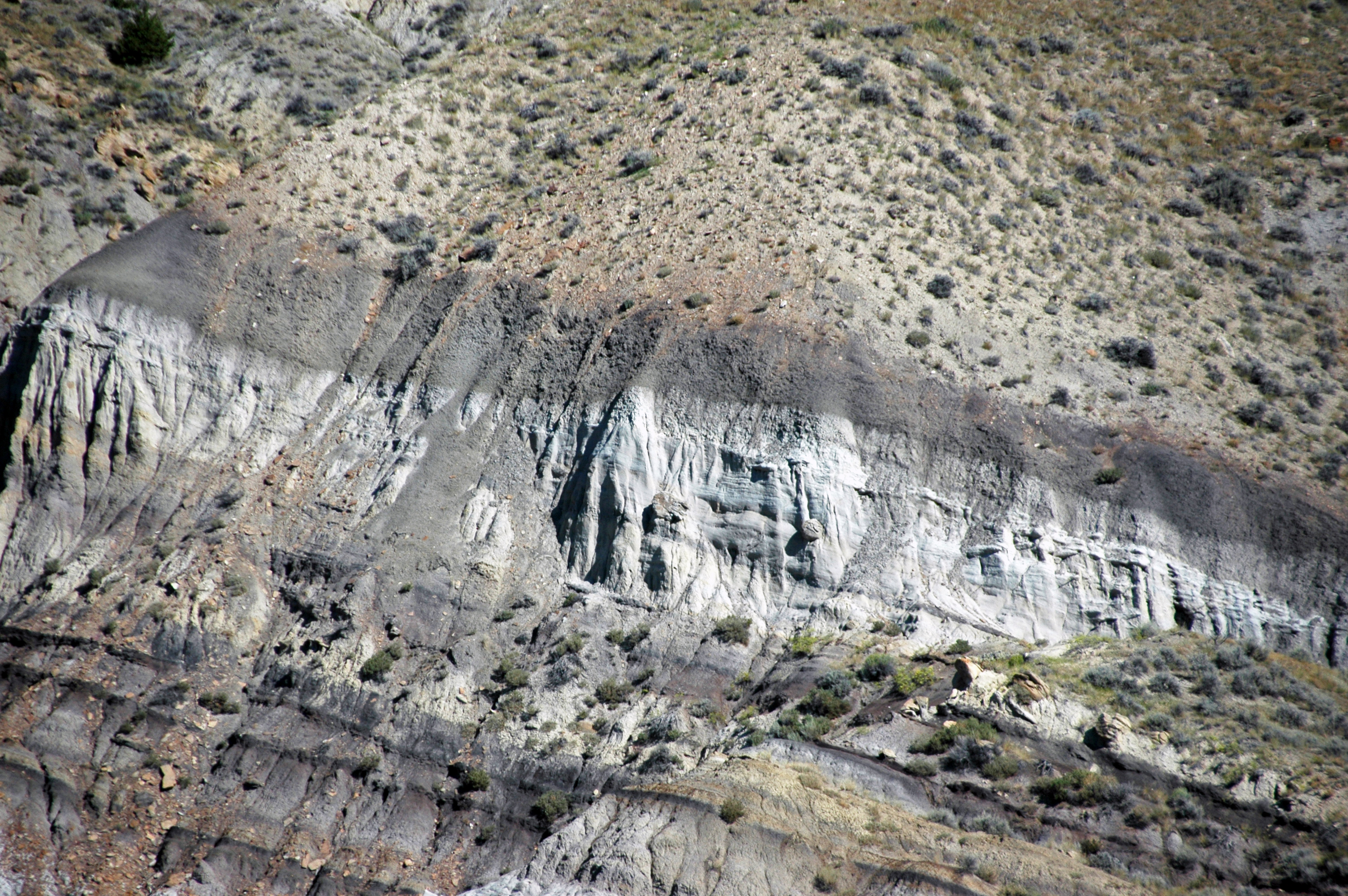
- Meeteetse Formation in Wyoming
- Type: Sedimentary
- Underlies: Lance Formation
- Overlies: Mesaverde Formation
- Thickness: 400 m

Lithology
- Primary: sand and sandstone
- Other: shale and bentonitic clay

Location
- Region: Rocky Mountains
- Extent: Wyoming

Type section
- Named for: Meeteetse Trail

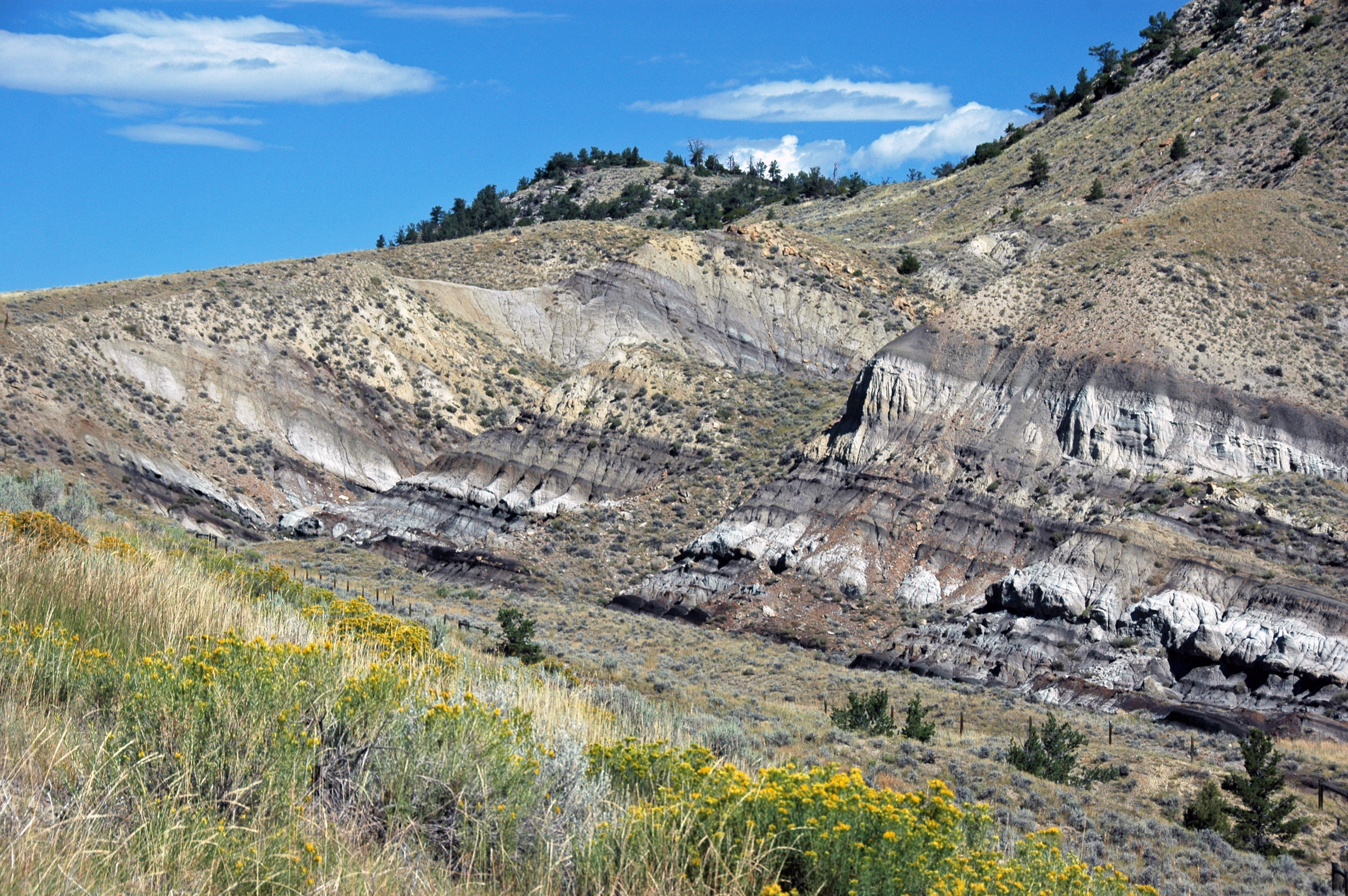
Meeteetse Formation

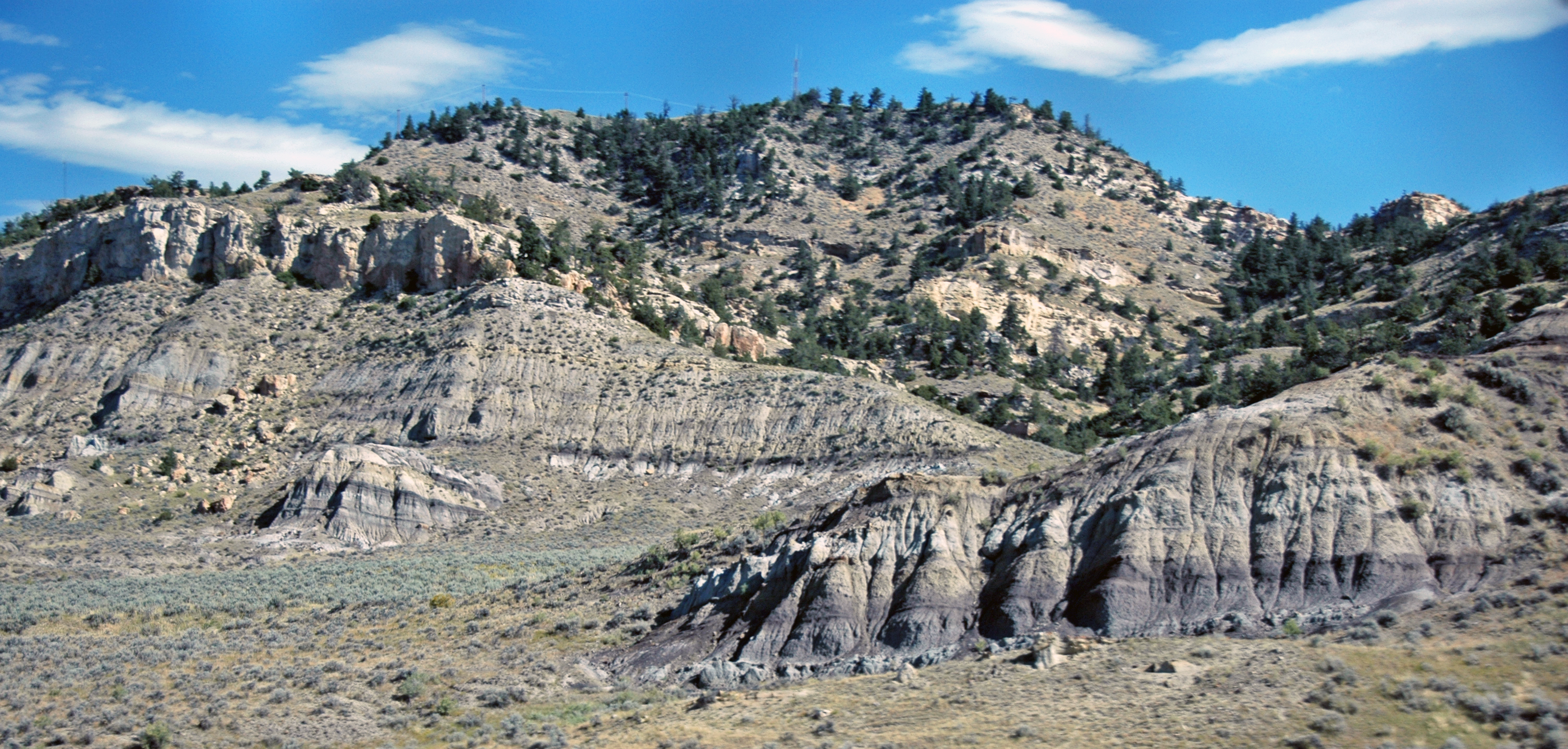
Meeteetse Formation, badlands

The Meeteetse Formation is a Late Cretaceous geologic formation occurring in Wyoming.

The formation is described by W.G. Pierce as gray to white clayey sand, drab sandstone, gray and brown shale, and bentonitic clay. It can form badlands.

Dinosaur remains are among the fossils that have been recovered from the formation, although none have yet been referred to a specific genus.

== See also ==
- List of dinosaur-bearing rock formations
  - List of stratigraphic units with indeterminate dinosaur fossils
