= Lewis Shale =

Geologic formation in the western United States

- Stratigraphic range: Campanian–Maastrichtian
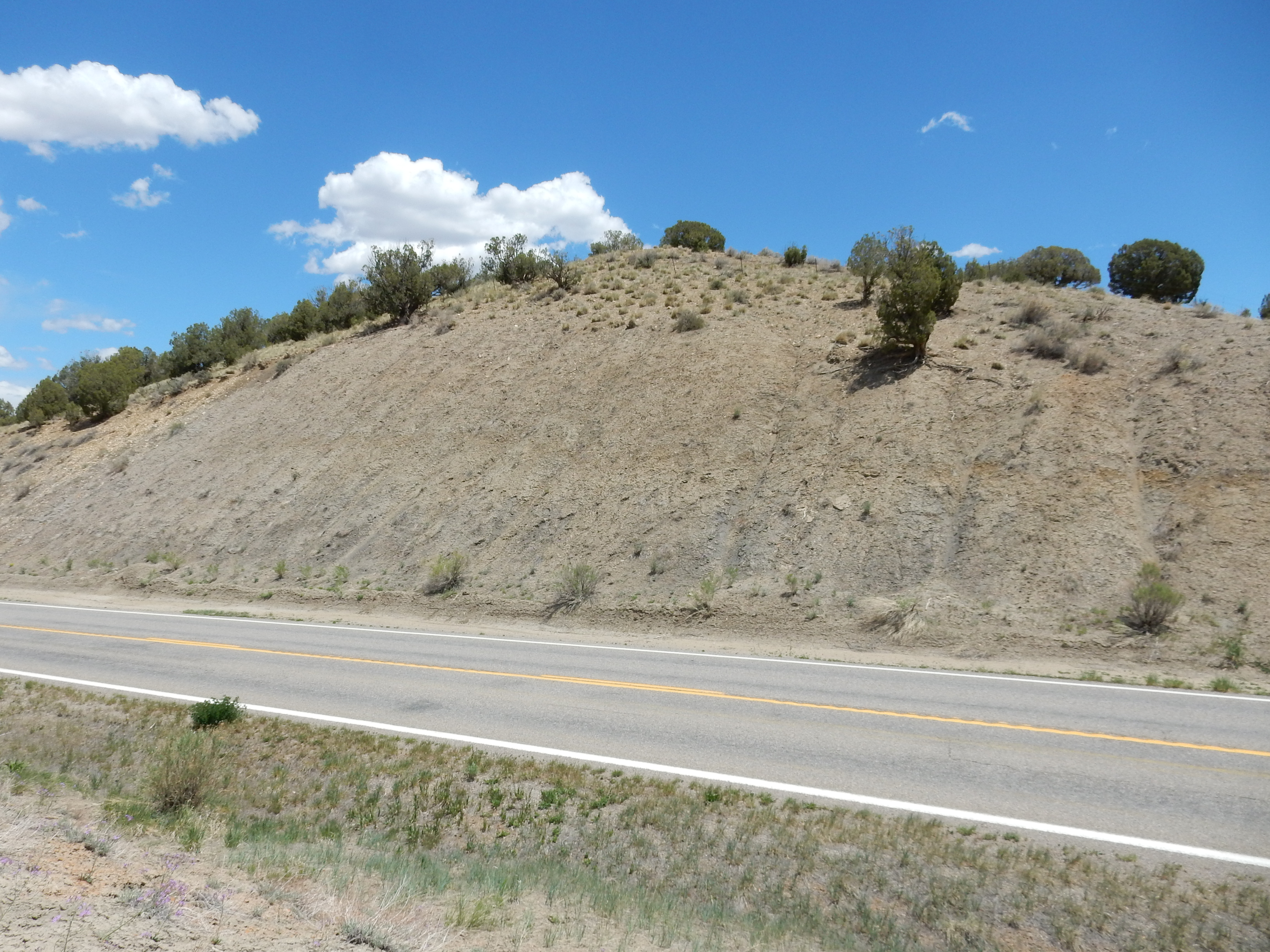
- Lewis Shale in road cut in the type area, La Plata valley, Colorado
- Type: Formation
- Sub-units: Dad Sandstone Member, Huerfanito Bentonite Bed, Teckla Sandstone Member.
- Underlies: Pictured Cliffs Formation
- Overlies: Mesaverde Group
- Thickness: 600 m

Lithology
- Primary: Shale
- Other: Sandstone

Location
- Coordinates: 37.215°N 108.006°W
- Region: Mountain states, United States
- Country: United States

Type section
- Named for: Fort Lewis (former Army installation in La Plata County, Colorado)
- Named by: Charles Whitman Cross, A.C. Spencer, and C.W. Purington
- Lewis Shale (the United States) Lewis Shale (Colorado)

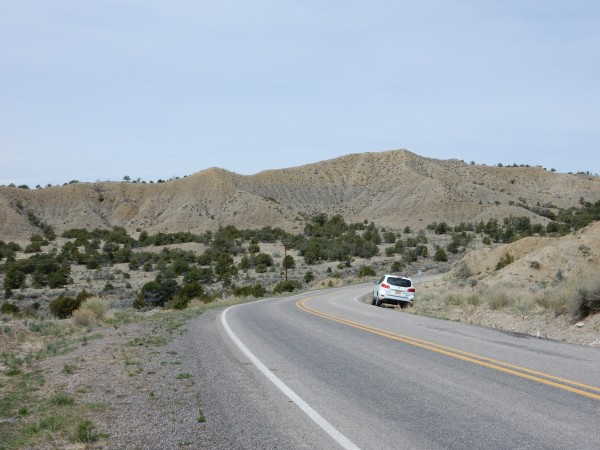
Hills underlain by Lewis Shale near Cuba, New Mexico

The Lewis Shale is a geologic formation in the Western United States. It preserves fossils dating back to the Campanian to Maastrichtian stages of the late Cretaceous period.

== Description ==
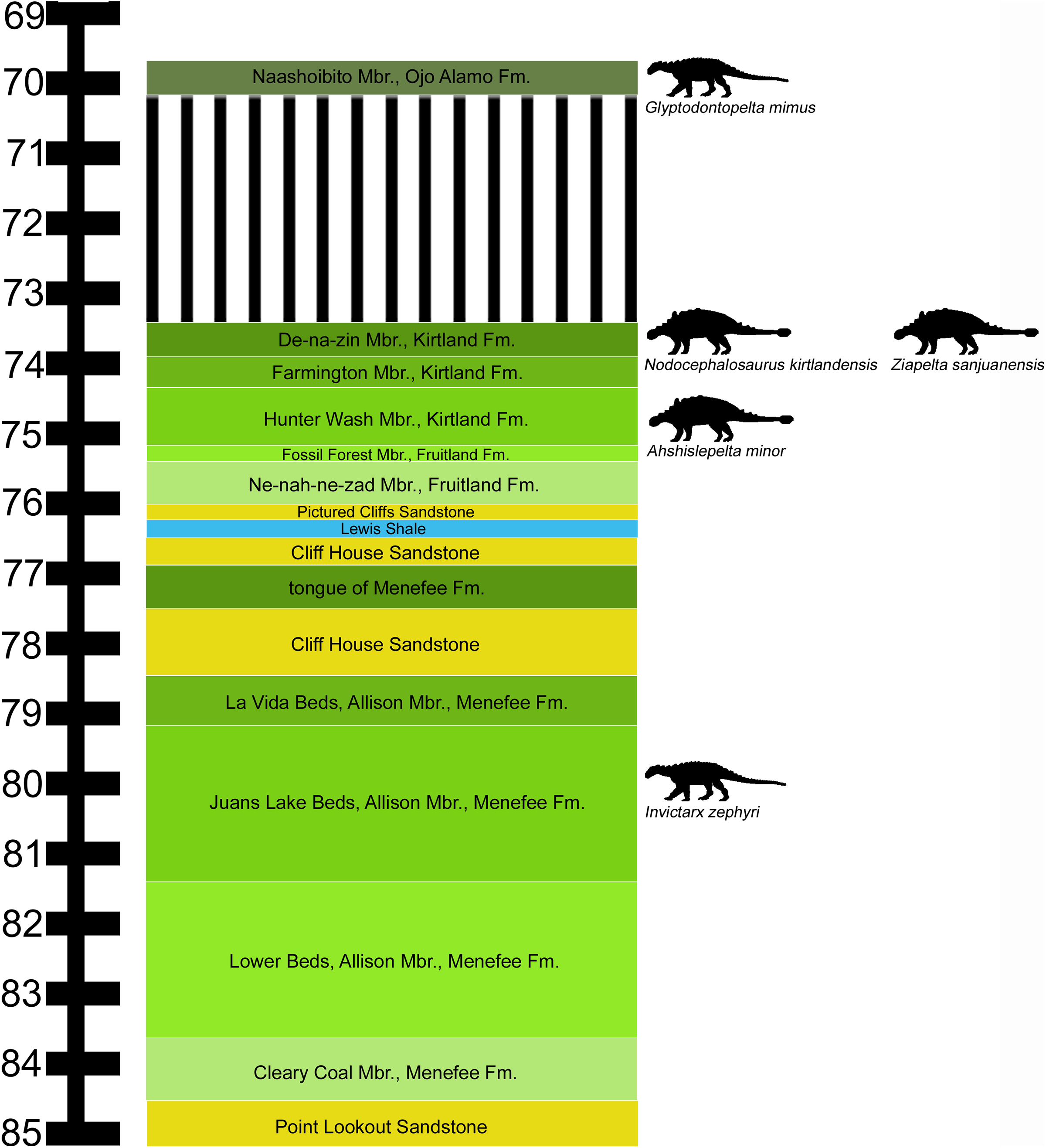
San Juan Basin Upper Cretaceous stratigraphy

The Lewis Shale is an olive-gray marine shale with some thin beds of claystone, siltstone, sandstone, and limestone. It was deposited in the Western Interior Seaway in the late Cretaceous. The formation crops out in the Bighorn Basin, Green River Basin, Powder River Basin, San Juan Basin, and Wind River Basin.

In the San Juan Basin, the formation has a maximum thickness of over 600 meters (2,000 ft) in the northern part of the basin, but pinches out in the southern part of the basin. It is the stratigraphically highest marine shale in the basin, and is a sandy siltstone rather than a true shale. The upper part of the formation contains the Huerfanito Bentonite Bed, long recognized in the subsurface but recently discovered to crop out near Regina, New Mexico. The bed lies in the upper Baculites scottii biostratigraphic zone and has a radiometric age of 75.76 ± 0.34 million years.

In the Green River Basin, the formation is also up to 600 meters thick and is divided into upper and lower shale members by the Dad Sandstone Member. The Dad Sandstone Member contains hyperpycnites, sediments deposited by floodwater from a river delta that contains so much sediment that it is more dense than seawater and behaves as a sustained turbidity current. This is consistent with deposition of the Lewis Shale as submarine fans deposited in advance of a prograding shoreline.

== Fossils ==
The formation is relatively poor in fossils. However, the formation contains fossils of the ammonites Baculites clinolobatus, Baculites asper, and Rhaeboceras.

== Economic geology ==
The Lewis Shale in the San Juan Basin has historically been a minor source of natural gas. However, there is growing interest in increasing the production of this formation via hydraulic fracturing. While only sixteen wells were completed into the Lewis Shale before 1990, there were over 101 well completions by 1997.

"Dry frac", a form of hydraulic fracturing using carbon dioxide and sand rather than aqueous fracturing fluids, has been tested in the Lewis Shale of the San Juan Basin.

== History of investigation ==
The formation was named by Charles Whitman Cross, A.C. Spencer, and C.W. Purington in 1899 for outcrops near Fort Lewis, Colorado.

== See also ==
- List of fossiliferous stratigraphic units in Colorado
- Paleontology in Colorado
