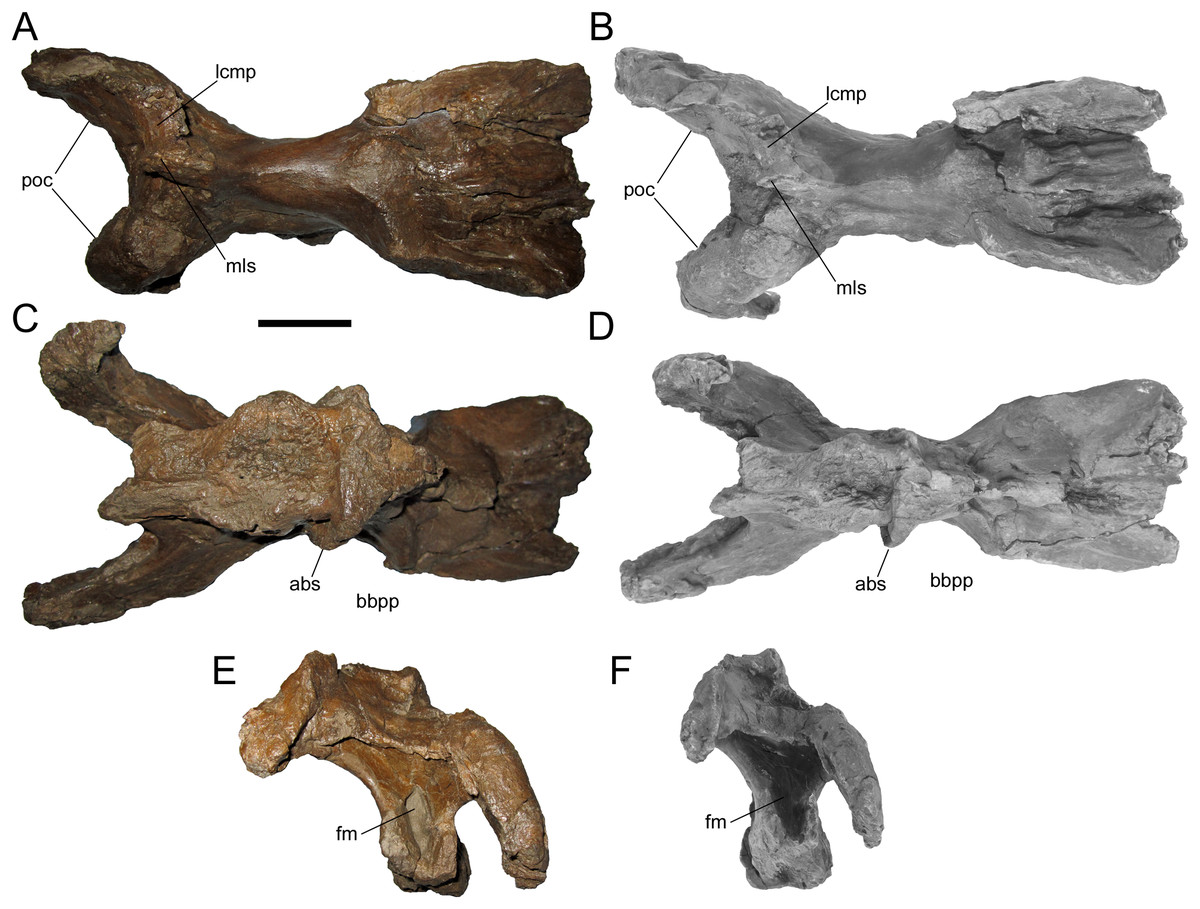
- Braincase of the holotype

Scientific classification
- Kingdom: Animalia
- Phylum: Chordata
- Class: Reptilia
- Clade: Dinosauria
- Clade: †Ornithischia
- Clade: †Ornithopoda
- Family: †Hadrosauridae
- Subfamily: †Saurolophinae
- Tribe: †Brachylophosaurini
- Genus: †Ornatops; McDonald et al., 2021
- Species: †O. incantatus

Binomial name
- †Ornatops incantatus McDonald et al., 2021

= Ornatops =

Ornatops Temporal range: Late Cretaceous, 78 Ma

Genus of hadrosaurid dinosaur from the Late Cretaceous period

Ornatops (meaning "ornate face") is a genus of brachylophosaurin saurolophine hadrosaur from the Upper Cretaceous Menefee Formation of New Mexico, United States. The genus contains a single species, Ornatops incantatus.

== Discovery and naming ==
Ornatops was originally discovered in 2018 within the Menefee Formation of New Mexico, United States. The fossil material was discovered by staff and volunteers from the Western Science Center, Zuni Dinosaur Institute for Geosciences, and Southwest Paleontological Society. The specimen was described on the basis of a relatively complete and articulated specimen WSC 10058 in 2021. The holotype consists of a well-preserved skull lacking the maxillae and lower jaws, two dorsal vertebrae, a rib, ossified tendons, the right scapula, most of the right humerus, ulna, and radius, the second and third right metacarpals as well as an incomplete ilium and ischium, making it the most complete dinosaur from the Menefee Formation.

In 2021, three years after its initial discovery, Ornatops received a proper type species name. Its generic name, Ornatops, means "ornate face" from Latin ornatus and Greek ops, in reference to the elaborate nasofrontal suture. The specific name, incantatus, means "enchanted"; it is a reference to New Mexico's moniker, the "Land of Enchantment".

== Description ==
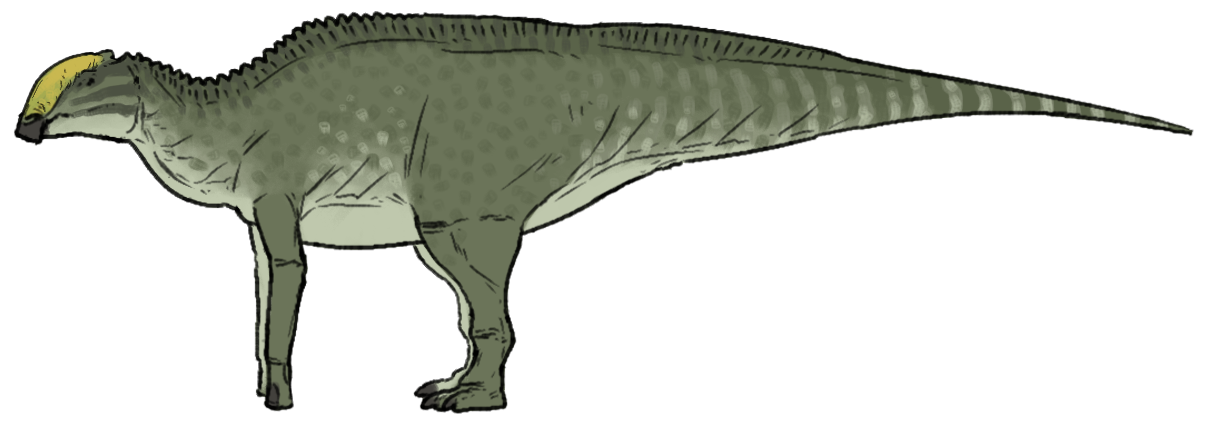
Life restoration

Ornatops incantatus was a genus of brachylophosaurin hadrosaurid that existed in what is now New Mexico, United States approximately 78 million years ago. The exact proportions of Ornatops remain undescribed as the paper naming and describing the genus only examined the cranial skeleton. However, a future paper analysing the post-cranial remains of Ornatops was announced.

The expanded nasofrontal suture of the holotype skull, which bears a pair of bumps as a unique autapomorphy, suggests that Ornatops in life had some form of crest, suggesting that it is likely related to and potentially intermediate between Probrachylophosaurus bergei and Brachylophosaurus canadensis. Because of this, Ornatops is the first crested brachylophosaurin found so far in southern Laramidia, which illustrates how diverse and distributed the clade was in North America during the Campanian.

== Classification ==
McDonald et al. place Ornatops in the Saurolophinae, specifically in the tribe Brachylophosaurini. Their cladogram is shown below:

- Hadrosauridae
  - Hadrosaurus
  - Euhadrosauria
    - Lambeosaurinae
    - Saurolophinae
      - - Kritosaurini
        - - Saurolophini
          - Edmontosaurini
      - Brachylophosaurini
        - Acristavus
        - - Maiasaura
          - - Probrachylophosaurus
            - Ornatops
            - Brachylophosaurus
