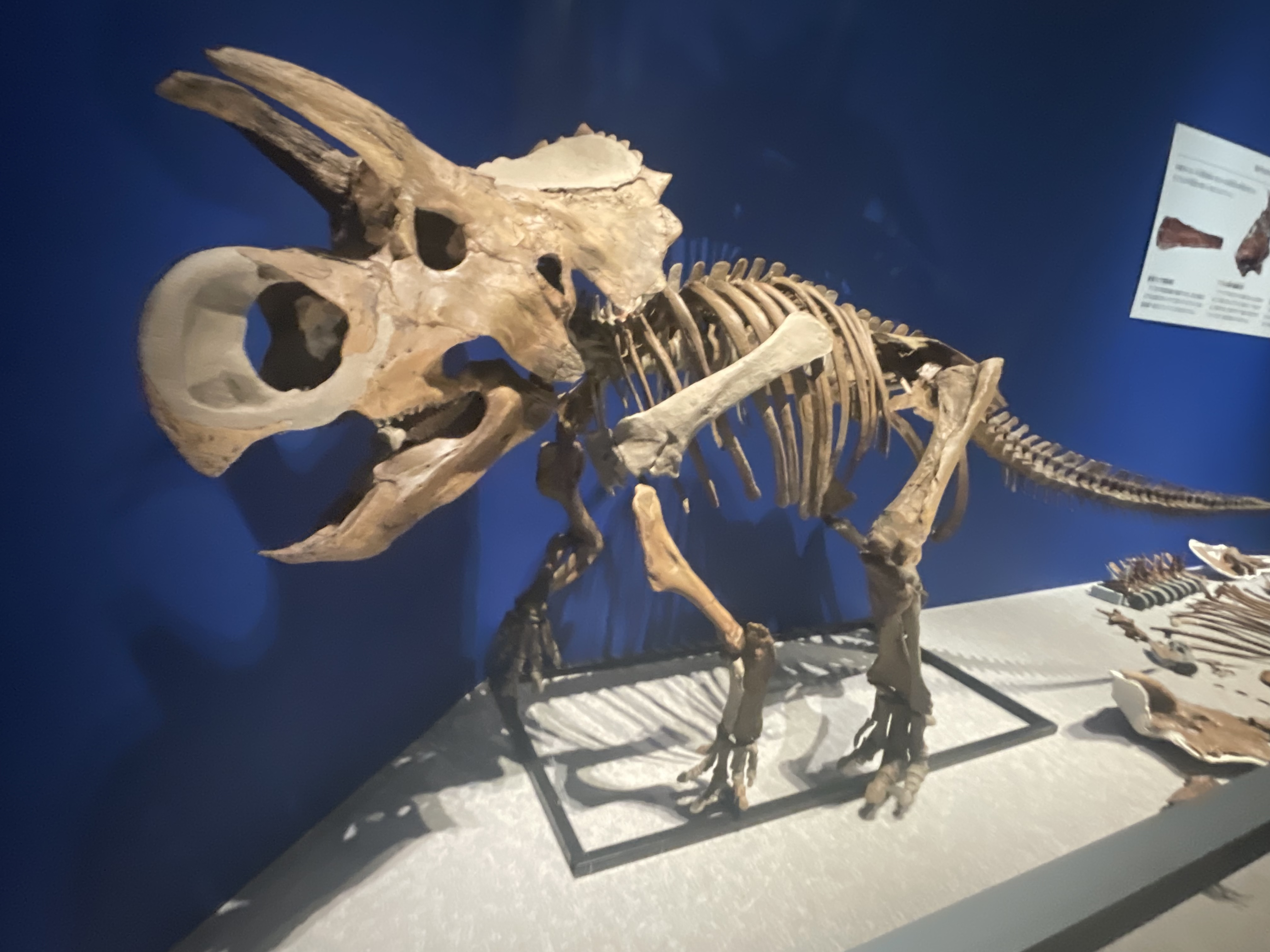
- Skeletal mount of F. elucidans exhibited at a limited exhibition event in the National Museum of Nature and Science, Tokyo

Scientific classification
- Kingdom: Animalia
- Phylum: Chordata
- Clade: Dinosauria
- Clade: †Ornithischia
- Clade: †Ceratopsia
- Family: †Ceratopsidae
- Subfamily: †Centrosaurinae
- Tribe: †Nasutoceratopsini
- Genus: †Furcatoceratops; Ishikawa et al., 2023

Type species
- †Furcatoceratops elucidans Ishikawa et al., 2023

= Furcatoceratops =

Furcatoceratops Temporal range: Campanian ~75.9–75.3 Ma

Extinct genus of dinosaurs

Furcatoceratops (meaning "forked horned face") is a genus of centrosaurine ceratopsid dinosaur from the Late Cretaceous Judith River Formation of Montana. The type species is Furcatoceratops elucidans.

== Discovery and naming ==
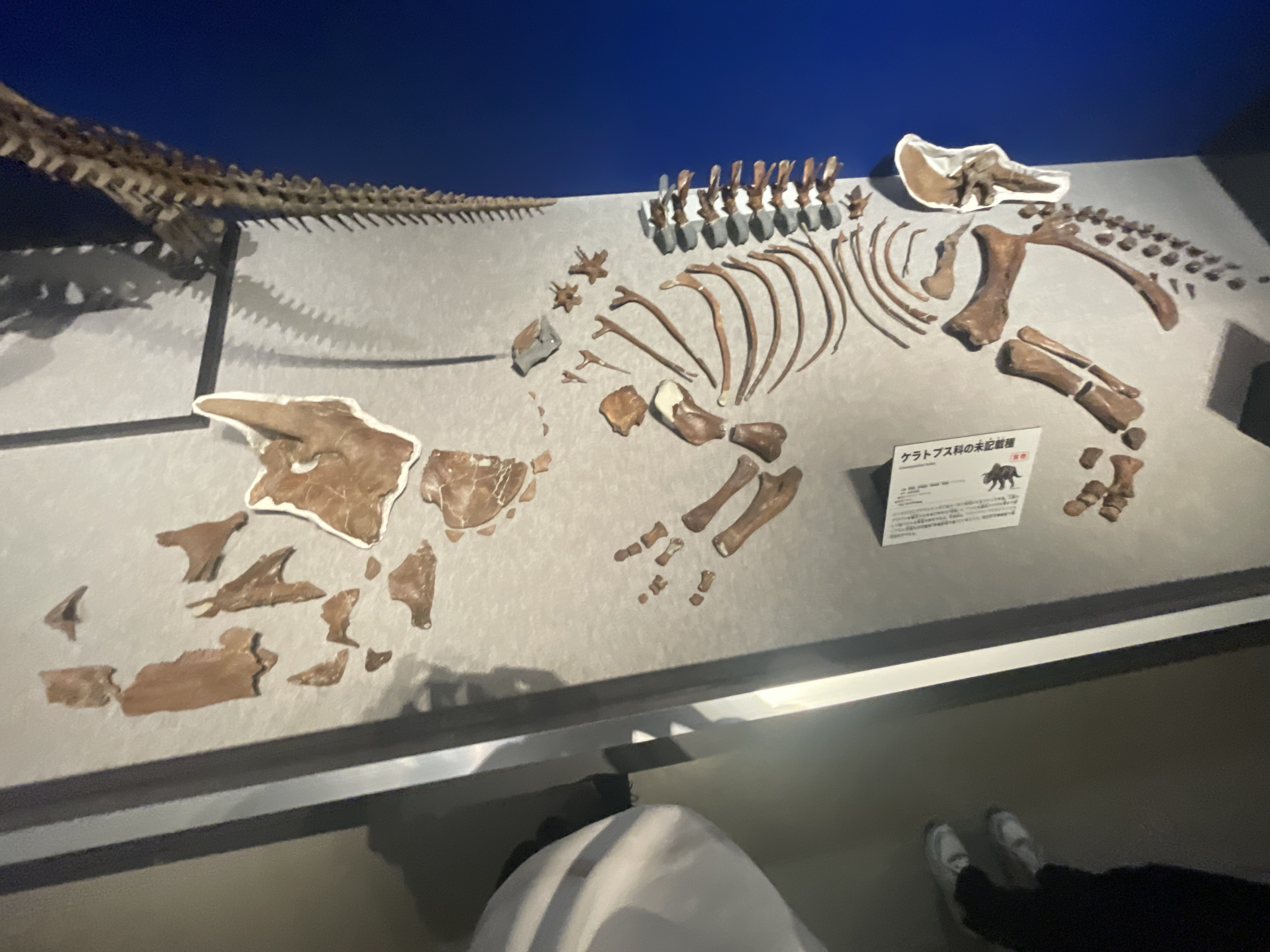
NSM PV 24660, which is the holotype specimen

The holotype specimen, NSM PV 24660, is a nearly complete disarticulated skeleton of a moderately-sized subadult. The skeleton preserves, among other elements, numerous elements of the skull, a nearly complete left front- and hindlimb, parts of the pelvis and most of the vertebral column. The specimen was excavated from Triebold Paleontology Incorporated's "12-020" site, a quarry in the Upper Cretaceous Judith River Formation in Fergus County, Montana. The quarry is located approximately 7 kilometres North-West of the town of Winifred. NSM PV 24660 was collected from rocks of the upper Coal Ridge Member, lying approximately 20 meters below the overlying Bearpaw Formation. Based on a Bayesian geochronological model from a 2022 study by Ramezani et al., the horizon from which the holotype was collected is recovered as approximately 75.6 (~75.3-75.9) Ma.

The holotype is currently housed at the National Museum of Nature and Science in Tsukuba, Japan, and was named as a new genus and species of ceratopsid in 2023. The generic name, Furcatoceratops, comes from the Latin furcatus, meaning "forked", and the Greek ceratops meaning "horned face". The specific name, elucidans, is Latin for "enlightening".

== Classification ==
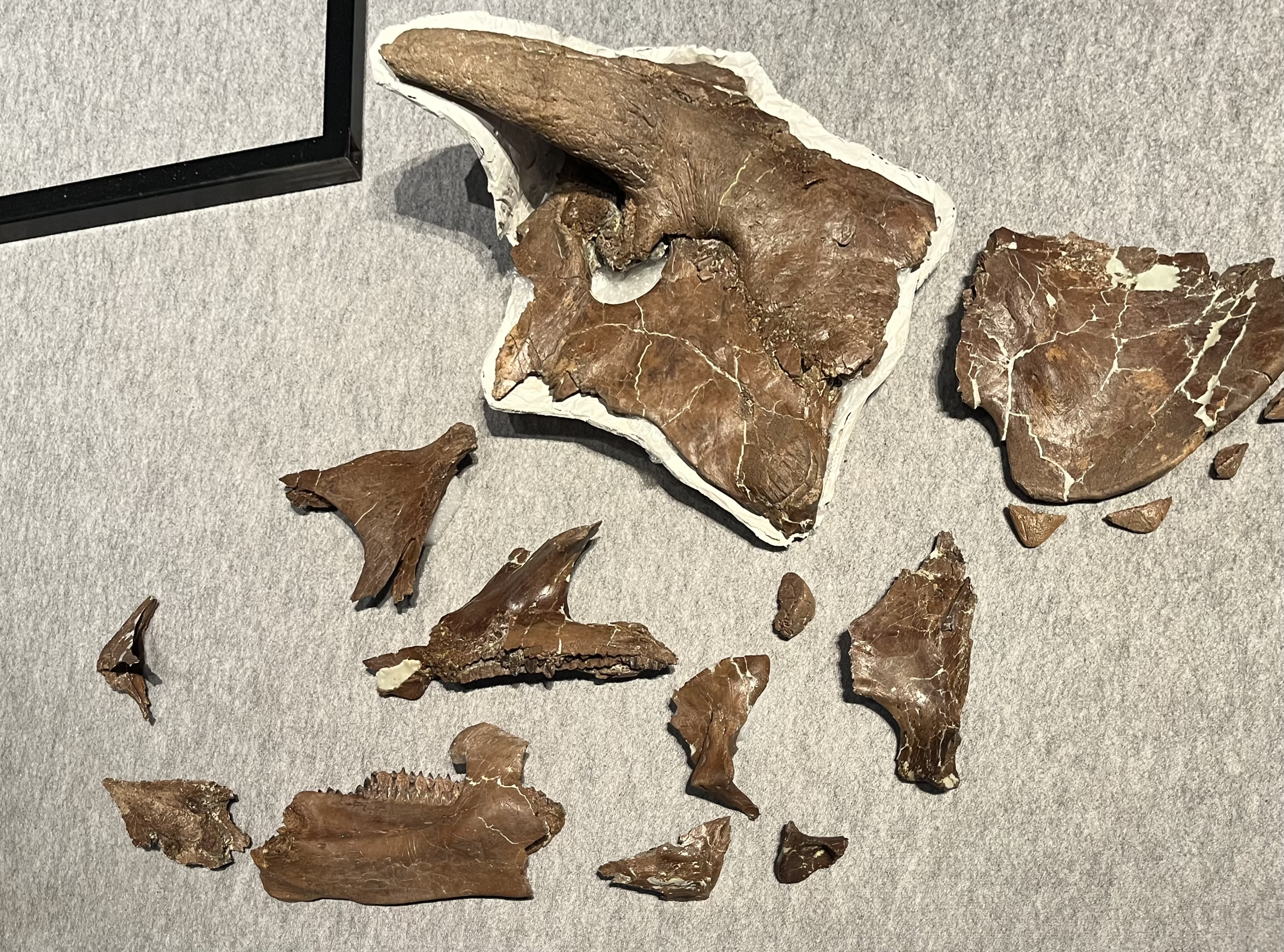
Skull of the holotype

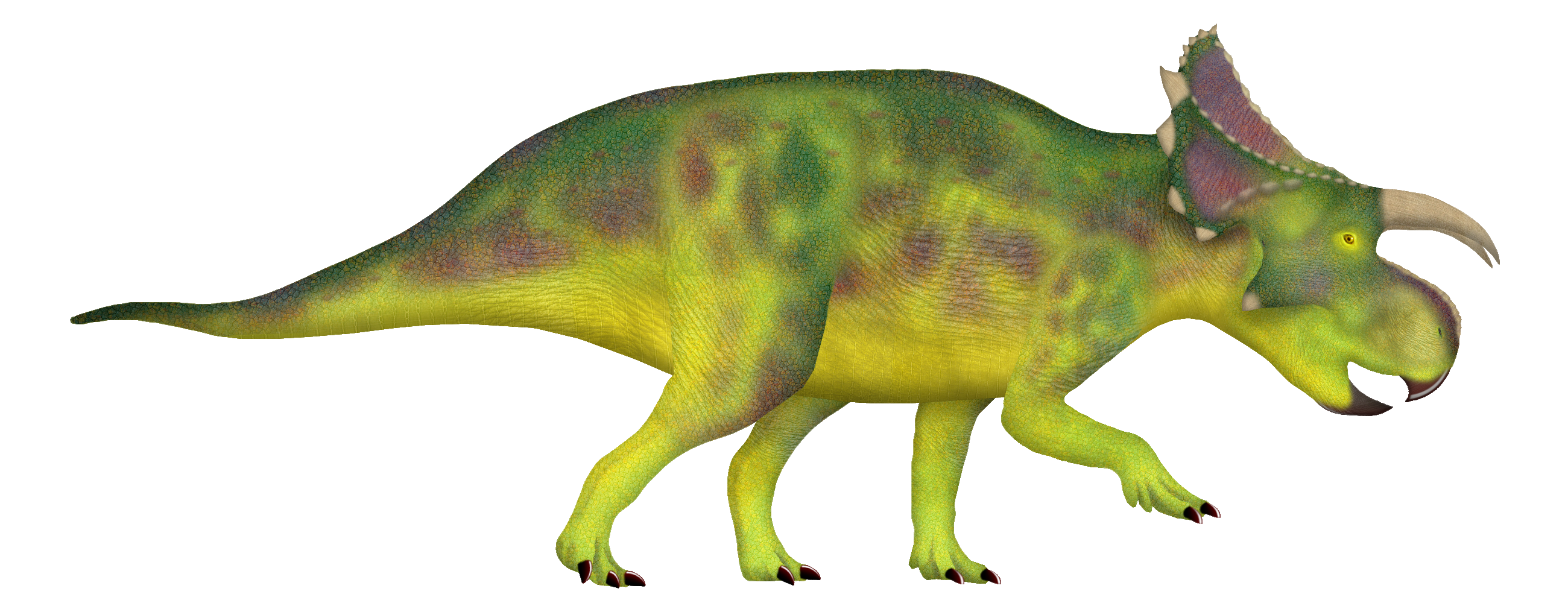
Life restoration

In the 2023 study that first described the animal, Furcatoceratops was included in a phylogenetic analysis with other ceratopsian dinosaurs and found to nestle within the clade Nasutoceratopsini. Other members of this clade of early branching centrosaurines include Avaceratops and Nasutoceratops, both also hailing from the Campanian of the United States.

- - Leptoceratops gracilis
  - Coronosauria
    - Protoceratopsidae
      - Protoceratops andrewsi
      - Bagaceratops rozhdestvenskyi
    - Ceratopsoidea
      - Zuniceratops christopheri
      - Turanoceratops tardabilis
      - Ceratopsidae
        - Chasmosaurinae
          - Chasmosaurus belli
          - Pentaceratops sternbergii
        - Centrosaurinae
          - Diabloceratops eatoni
          - Machairoceratops cronusi
          - - Nasutoceratopsini
              - ANSP 15800 (Avaceratops holotype)
              - CMN 8804
              - MOR 692 (cf. Avaceratops)
              - Nasutoceratops titusi
              - Furcatoceratops elucidans
            - Xenoceratops foremostensis
            - Albertaceratops nesmoi
            - Medusaceratops lokii
            - Wendiceratops pinhornensis
            - Sinoceratops zhuchengensis
            - Eucentrosaura
              - Coronosaurus brinkmani
              - Centrosaurus apertus
              - Spinops sternbergorum
              - - Styracosaurus albertensis
                - Styracosaurus ovatus
              - Stellasaurus ancellae
              - Pachyrhinosaurini
                - Einiosaurus procurvicornis
                - - Achelousaurus horneri
                  - - Pachyrhinosaurus lakustai
                    - - Pachyrhinosaurus canadensis
                      - Pachyrhinosaurus perotorum

== Paleoenvironment ==
The Judith River Formation has produced the remains of several dinosaurs, several of which have been recovered in the early days of paleontology, as well as others identified more recently. Among others, Furcatoceratops coexisted with fellow ceratopsids Avaceratops, Medusaceratops, and Spiclypeus, the hadrosaur Brachylophosaurus, the ankylosaur Zuul, the tyrannosaur Daspletosaurus, and the giant alligatoroid Deinosuchus.
