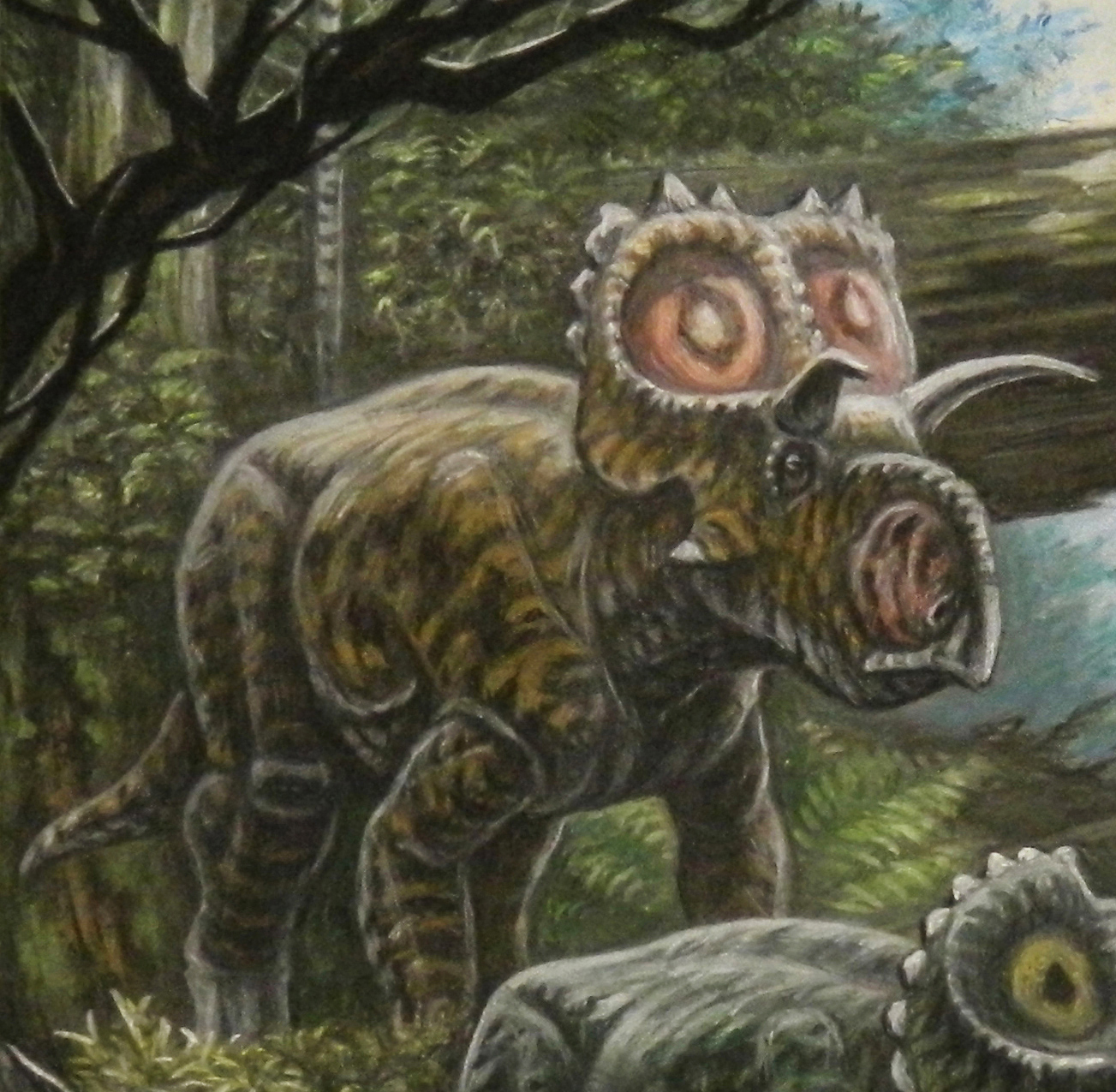
- Life reconstruction of C. krzyzanowskii

Scientific classification
- Kingdom: Animalia
- Phylum: Chordata
- Class: Reptilia
- Clade: Dinosauria
- Clade: †Ornithischia
- Clade: †Ceratopsia
- Family: †Ceratopsidae
- Subfamily: †Centrosaurinae
- Tribe: †Nasutoceratopsini
- Genus: †Crittendenceratops; Dalman et al., 2018
- Species: †C. krzyzanowskii

Binomial name
- †Crittendenceratops krzyzanowskii Dalman et al., 2018

= Crittendenceratops =

Crittendenceratops Temporal range: Campanian, 73 Ma

Extinct genus of dinosaurs

Crittendenceratops (meaning "horned face from the Fort Crittenden Formation") is a genus of horned centrosaurine ceratopsid dinosaur from the late Campanian Fort Crittenden Formation of Arizona. It contains a single species, C. krzyzanowskii, and represents the first dinosaur taxon from that formation to receive a formal scientific name.

== Description ==
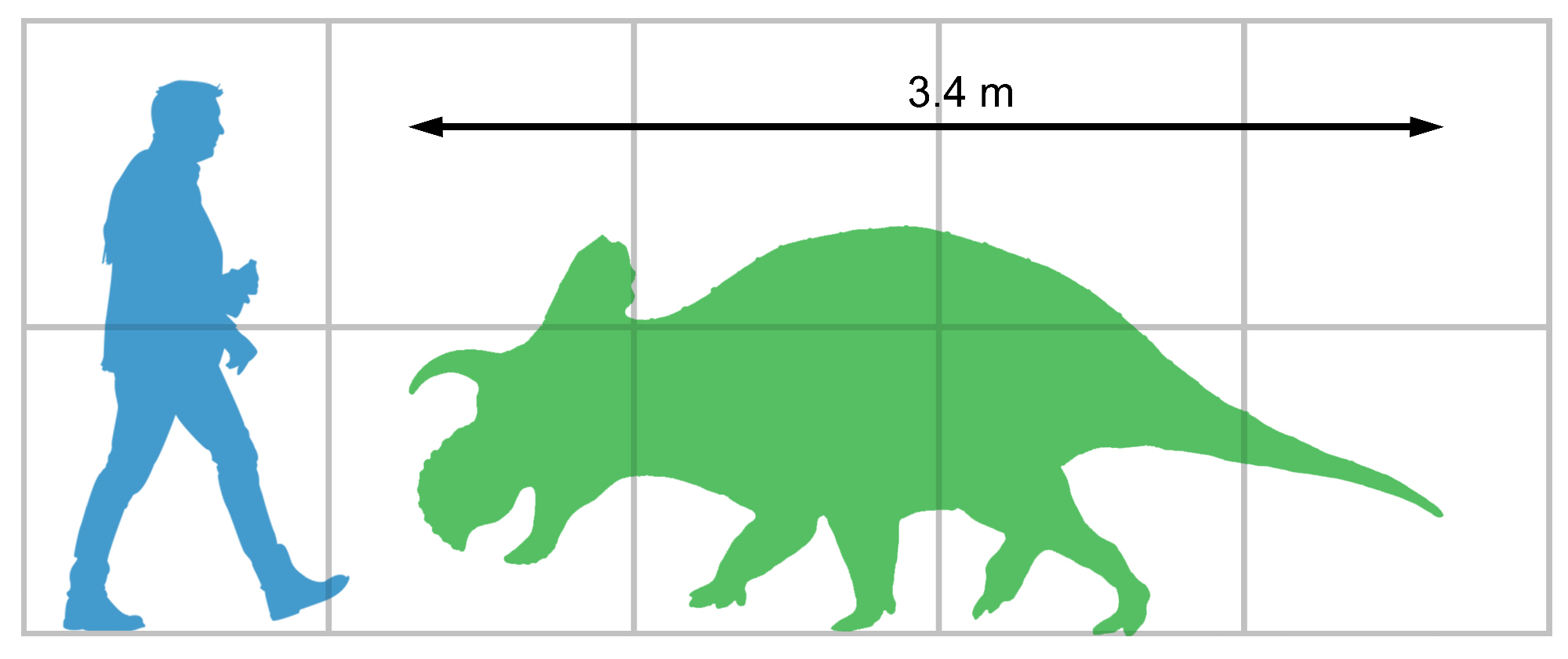
Size of Crittendenceratops compared to a human

Crittendenceratops is distinguished by forward-curving, hook-like flanges located along the central portion of the top of the frill, "extensive" epiparietals located along the sides of the parietal portion of the frill, a thickening of the frill in the parietal portion, and a short, pronounced ridge on the surface of the squamosal portion of the frill.

== Classification ==
Crittendenceratops was assigned to the Nasutoceratopsini (which also includes Avaceratops, Nasutoceratops, and Yehuecauhceratops), a tribe of the ceratopsid subfamily Centrosaurinae, by Dalman et al. (2018). The cladogram below follows their phylogenetic analysis:

- - Diabloceratops eatoni
  - Centrosaurinae
    - Nasutoceratopsini
      - - - - Yehuecauhceratops mudei
            - Nasutoceratops titusi
          - - Avaceratops lammersi
            - MOR 692
        - CMN 8804
      - - Crittendenceratops krzyzanowskii
        - 'Malta centrosaurine'
    - - Albertaceratops nesmoi
      - - Medusaceratops lokii
        - - - Sinoceratops zhuchengensis
            - Wendiceratops pinhornensis
          - - Machairoceratops cronusi
            - Eucentrosaura
              - - - Einiosaurus procurvicornis
                  - Achelousaurus horneri
                - - Pachyrhinosaurus perotorum
                  - - Pachyrhinosaurus lakustai
                    - Pachyrhinosaurus canadensis
              - Centrosaurini
                - - Coronosaurus brinkmani
                  - - Xenoceratops foremostensis
                    - Spinops sternbergorum
                - - Centrosaurus apertus
                  - - Rubeosaurus ovatus
                    - Styracosaurus albertensis

== See also ==
- Timeline of ceratopsian research
- 2018 in archosaur paleontology
