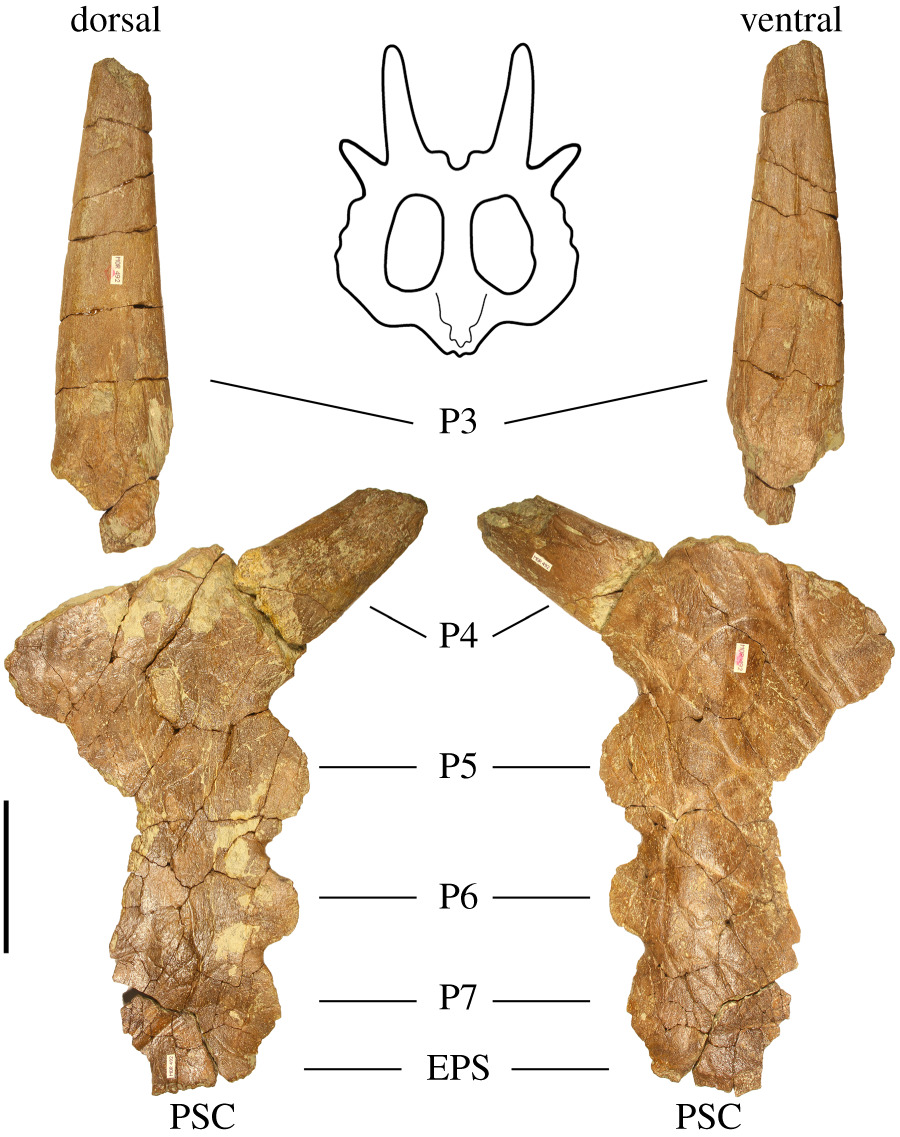
- Parietal bar of the holotype specimen MOR 492

Scientific classification
- Kingdom: Animalia
- Phylum: Chordata
- Class: Reptilia
- Clade: Dinosauria
- Clade: †Ornithischia
- Clade: †Ceratopsia
- Family: †Ceratopsidae
- Subfamily: †Centrosaurinae
- Clade: †Eucentrosaura
- Tribe: †Pachyrhinosaurini
- Genus: †Stellasaurus; Wilson, Ryan & Evans, 2020

Type species
- †Stellasaurus ancellae Wilson, Ryan & Evans, 2020

= Stellasaurus =

Stellasaurus Temporal range: Late Cretaceous, 75.2 Ma

Extinct genus of dinosaur

Stellasaurus (meaning "star lizard"; both in reference to the shape of its head ornamentation and as an homage to the song "Starman" by David Bowie) is a genus of centrosaurine ceratopsid dinosaur that lived in Montana during the Late Cretaceous. The type and only species is Stellasaurus ancellae. Its remains have been found in the late Campanian-aged Two Medicine Formation, the same geological unit which its relatives Rubeosaurus (now seen as a synonym of Styracosaurus), Einiosaurus, and Achelousaurus were discovered in.

Originally proposed as a distinct taxon in 1992, the specimens were later assigned to Rubeosaurus. In 2020, a re-evaluation questioned the referral and named it as a distinct species in a new genus. The describers saw it as a transitional form between Styracosaurus albertensis and Einiosaurus on a single evolutionary line that led to Achelousaurus and Pachyrhinosaurus.

== Description ==
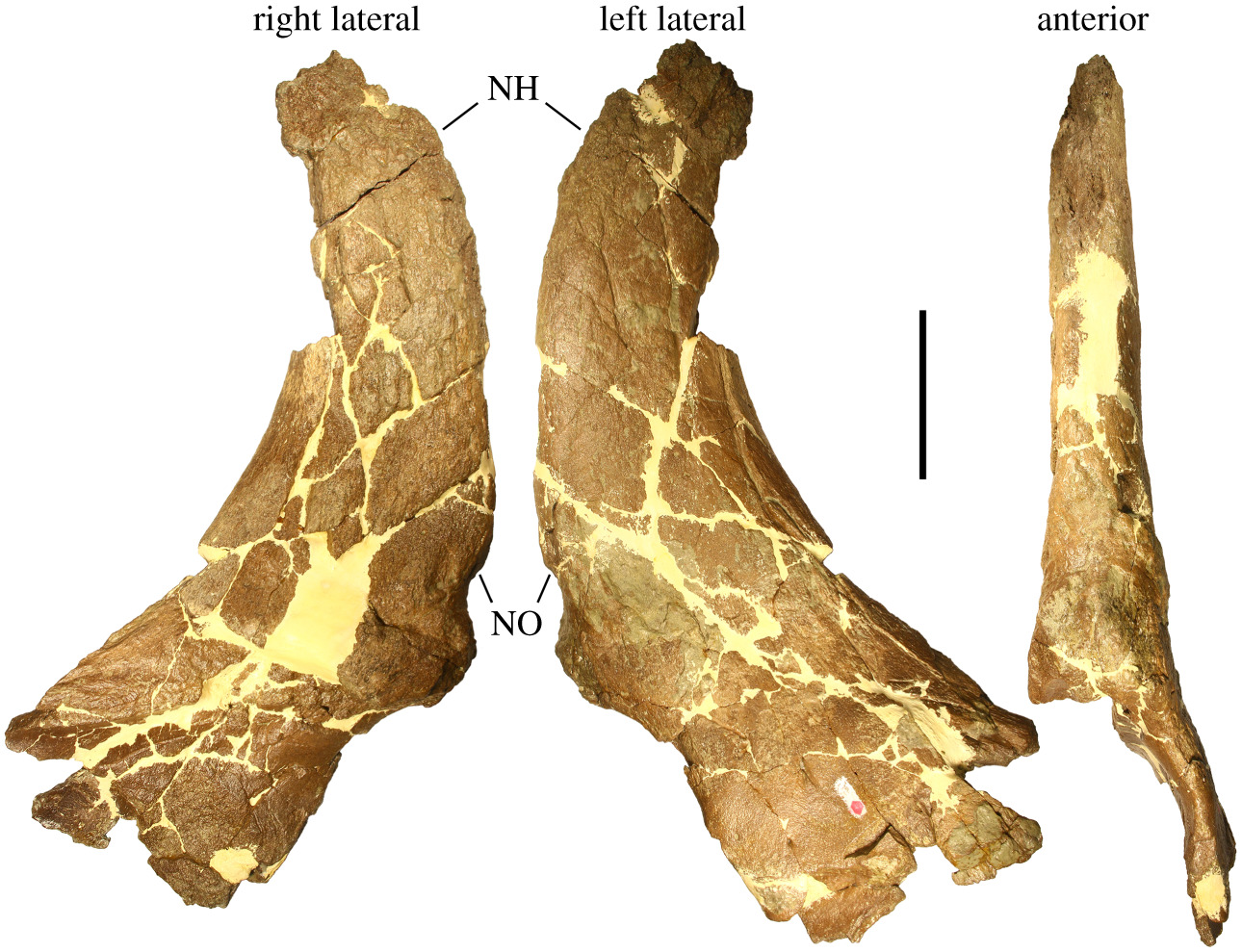
Nasal horn

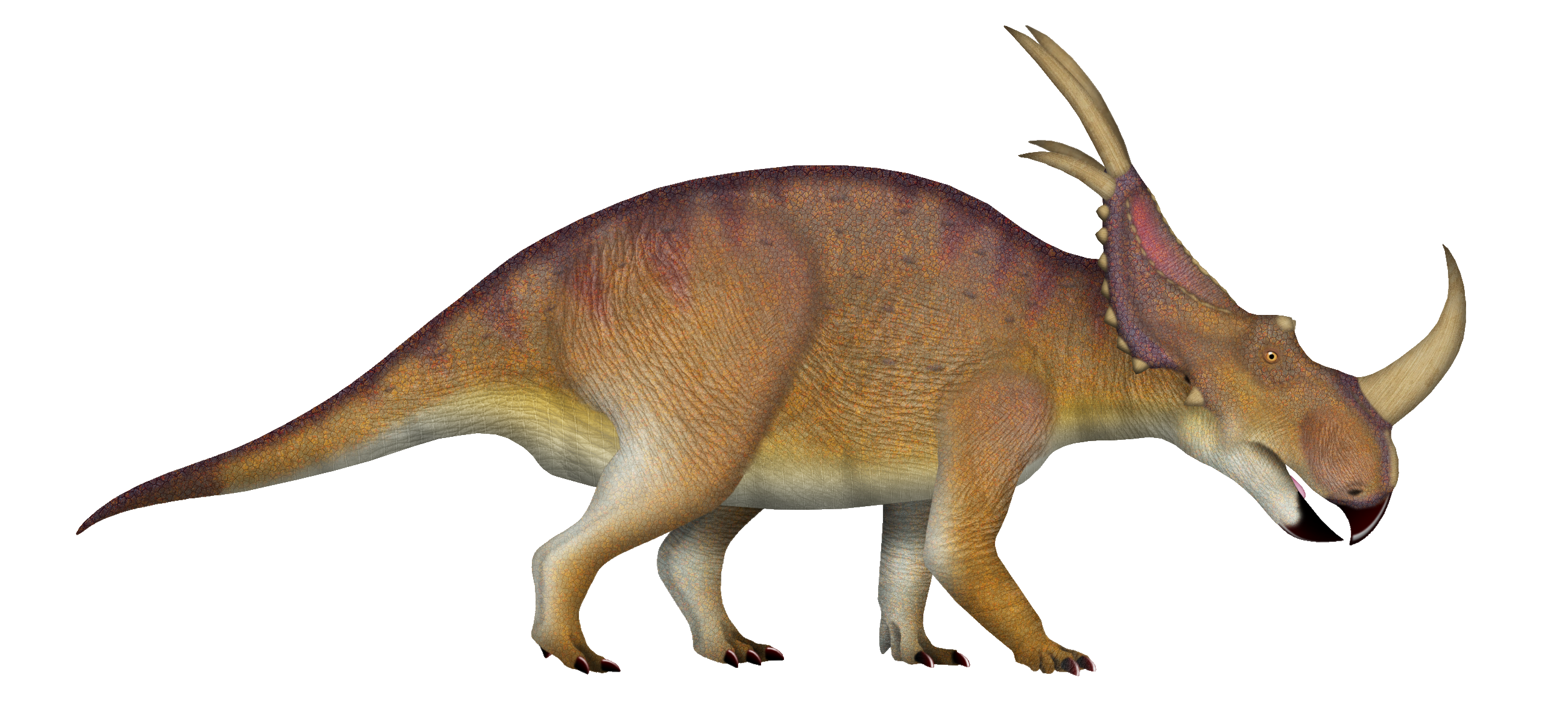
Speculative life restoration of Stellasaurus

Like other ceratopsid dinosaurs, Stellasaurus would have had complex cranial ornamentation. In particular, it shared similar anatomy to other derived eucentrosaurs, and has been described as having an anatomy intermediate between that of Styracosaurus albertensis and Einiosaurus, its presumed ancestor and descendant. Like the former, it possessed a very long nasal horn, larger than that found in Centrosaurus. This horn is erect and recurved (pointed inwards, unlike the very procurved horn of Einiosaurus which points in the opposite direction) and compressed, laterally. The supraorbital condition was also very similar to Styracosaurus albertensis, with a tiny remnant of a horncore. Its parietal anatomy is much more similar to Einiosaurus, with long, straight third parietal spines, similarly straight fourth parietal spines less than half the size of these, and fifth through seventh ones not elongated at all. Similar to Einiosaurus and Achelousaurus, no epiparietals or episquamosals, in the sense of separate "frill ossifications", have been found, indicating the three genera may have lacked them.

Wilson and Ryan differ from other researchers in their interpretation of the fossil. Jack Horner believed in 2010 that the right side of the neck shield was preserved; according to the 2020 article by Wilson et al., Horner had mistakenly reversed the shield edge. Wilson also believed that he could have determined the correct position of the third parietal ("P3"), more or less parallel in the longitudinal direction of the head, while Horner believed that this projection was more inward than in the Styracosaurus (Rubeosaurus?) ovatus holotype. Another point of contention is the count of the epiparietalia. According to Andrew McDonald the frost is epiparietal the P8, but according to Wilson, Ryan & Evans it is the P7. Incidentally, they do not call the protuberances "epiparietalia" because this presupposes that they have grown together osteoderms, separate skin ossifications. They do not consider these to have been demonstrated in Styracosaurus, Stellasaurus and Einiosaurus. It would instead involve outgrowths of the wall leg. Likewise, they do not speak of episquamosalia.

== Classification ==
Stellasaurus is placed within the Ceratopsidae in the Centrosaurinae. The descriptors view the species as an intermediate between Styracosaurus albertensis and Einiosaurus, and not closely related to Rubeosaurus ovatus (which the describers consider to be a species of Styracosaurus). The authors dismiss an interpretation of the evolution of ceratopsids in these formations as a succession of divisions. They see this as a violation of the requirement of parsimony. After all, every split presupposes the existence of a last common ancestor, a splitting mechanism, a second branch that has left no fossils and the extinction of that branch. In comparison, a model of direct ancestry would be much simpler. It is usually objected to this line of reasoning that given the existence of a second branch, the ancestor and the extinction are already implicit and thus do not make it more unlikely. In addition, there is an infinity of possible splits. Indeed, the no-split model is more likely than any of the split models, but that's not to say it's more likely than the total of those models. That would depend on the a priori probability of a split, something about which little data is available.

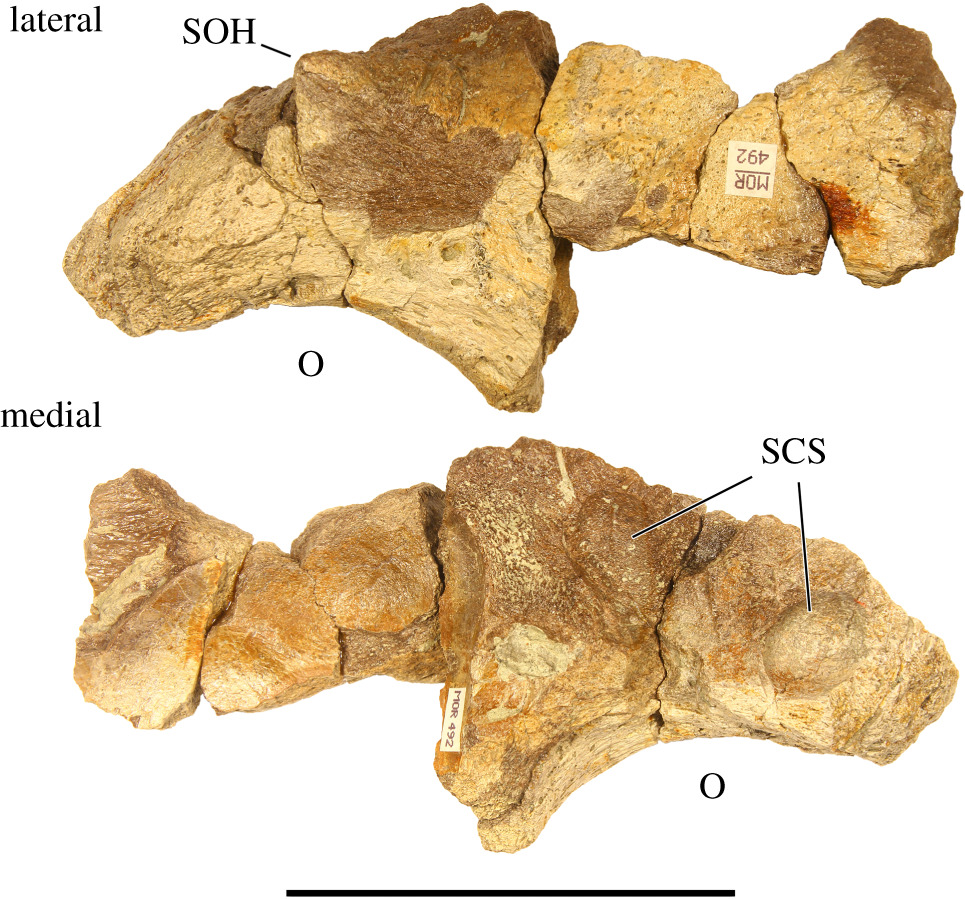
Left supraorbital ornamentation

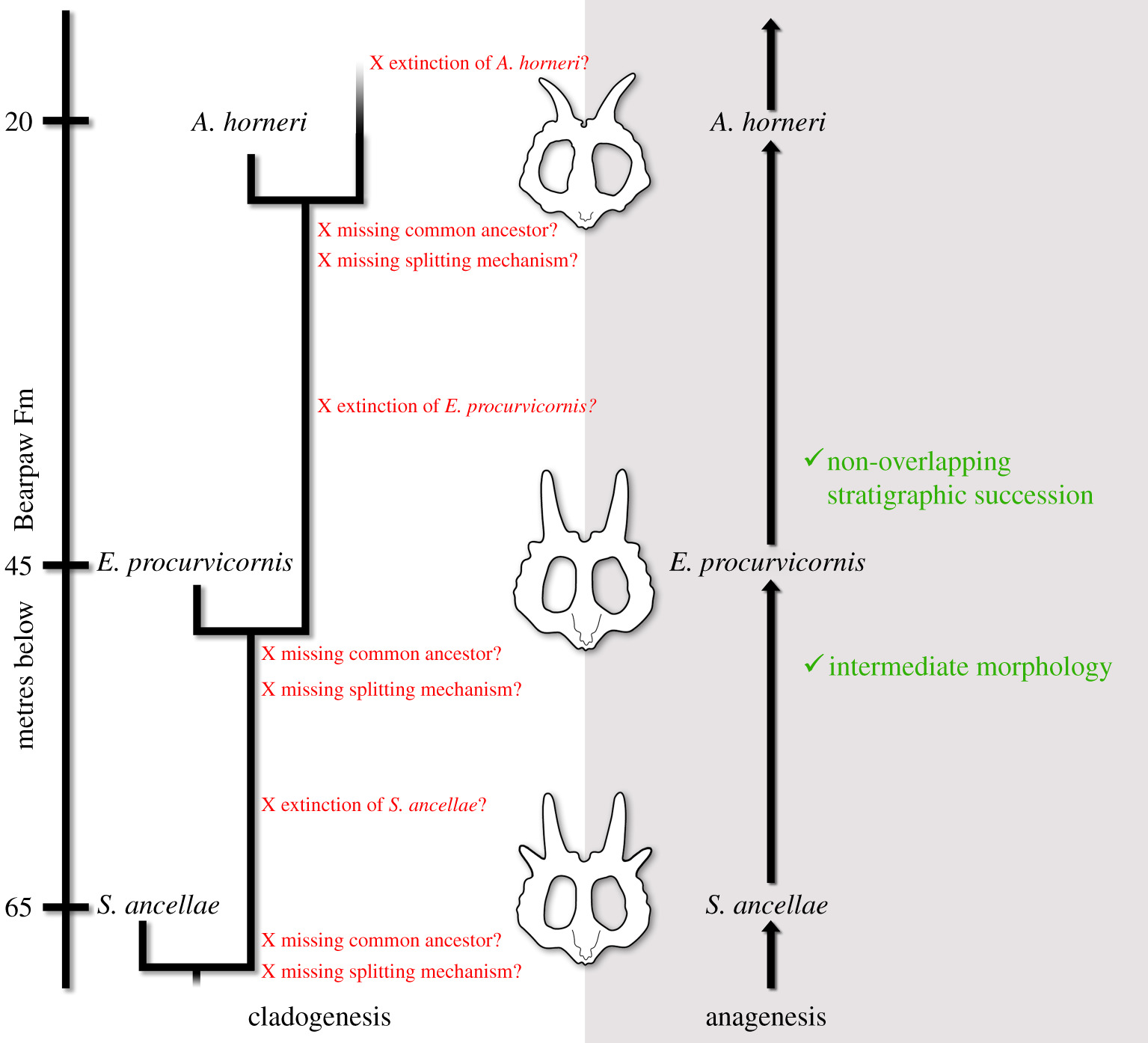
Comparison of the two major evolutionary mode hypotheses for the Two Medicine Formation centrosaurines

The cladogram below shows the phylogenetic position of Stellasaurus in a cladogram from Wilson, Ryan & Evans (2020).

- Centrosaurinae
  - - - Xenoceratops foremostensis
      - - Medusaceratops lokii
        - - Wendiceratops pinhornensis
          - Sinoceratops zhuchengensis
    - - - Machairoceratops cronusi
        - Diabloceratops eatoni
      - - Albertaceratops nesmoi
        - - Nasutoceratops titusi
          - Avaceratops lammersi
  - - - Spinops sternbergorum
      - - Centrosaurus apertus
        - Coronosaurus brinkmani
    - - - Styracosaurus ovatus
        - Styracosaurus albertensis
      - - Stellasaurus ancellae
        - - Einiosaurus procurvicornis
          - - Achelousaurus horneri
            - - Pachyrhinosaurus lakustai
              - - Pachyrhinosaurus perotorum
                - Pachyrhinosaurus canadensis

== Paleoecology ==
Dinosaurs that lived alongside Stellasaurus include the basal ornithopod Orodromeus, hadrosaurids (such as Hypacrosaurus, Maiasaura, and Prosaurolophus), the centrosaurines Brachyceratops and Einiosaurus, the leptoceratopsid Cerasinops, the ankylosaurs Edmontonia and Euoplocephalus, the tyrannosaurid Daspletosaurus (which appears to have been a specialist of preying on ceratopsians), as well as the smaller theropods Bambiraptor, Chirostenotes, Troodon, and Avisaurus.
