= Timberlake Formation =

Geologic formation in New Mexico, USA

- Stratigraphic range: late Paleocene–Eocene
- Type: Formation
- Underlies: Bluff Creek Tuff
- Overlies: Ringbone Formation; Cowboy Spring Formation
- Thickness: 150 meters (490 ft)

Lithology
- Primary: Limestone conglomerate

Location
- Coordinates: 31.611°N 108.626°W
- Region: New Mexico
- Country: United States

Type section
- Named for: Timberlake Ranch
- Named by: Zeller and Alper
- Year defined: 1965
- Timberlake Formation (the United States) Timberlake Formation (New Mexico)

The Timberlake Formation is a geologic formation exposed in the Animas Mountains of southwestern New Mexico. Its age is estimated to be late Paleocene to Eocene.

== Description ==
The formation is primarily limestone cobble conglomerate. The massive conglomerate beds are separated by thinner beds of sandstone, shale, claystone, and tuff. The clasts in the conglomerate are embedded in a red arkosic matrix or a poorly sorted limestone conglomerate matrix. In some locations, the formation contains boulders of limestone conglomerate over 200 feet (61 m) in diameter that appear to be derived from the underlying Cowboy Spring Formation. The formation is separated from the Cowbow Springs Formation, which it strongly resembles, with angular unconformity. Its maximum thickness is 150 meters (490 ft).

The formation was deposited in the Little Hat Top basin, a downwarp on the southern flank of the Hidalgo uplift. It is overlain by the Bluff Creek Tuff, which has been radiometrically dated as 35.1 million years old. This constrains the Timberlake Formation to not be younger than Eocene. The formation is interpreted as a fanglomerate produced by erosion of early Tertiary Laramide uplifts.

== History of investigation ==
The formation was first named by Zeller and Alper in 1965 for outcrops near Cowboy Spring in the Animas Mountains. Elston and Erb recommended merging the formation with the underlying Cowboy Spring Formation due to lack of a clear lithological distinction, but this has not been universally accepted.
