= Hidalgo Formation =

Geologic formation in New Mexico

- Stratigraphic range: Maastrichtian; ~70.53–71.44 Ma
- Type: Geological formation
- Underlies: Rubio Peak Formation
- Overlies: Ringbone Formation, Skunk Ranch Formation
- Thickness: 7,500 feet (2,300 m)

Lithology
- Primary: Basalt, andesite
- Other: Volcaniclastics, limestone, shale

Location
- Coordinates: 31.847°N 108.457°W
- Region: New Mexico
- Country: United States

Type section
- Named for: Hidalgo County, New Mexico
- Named by: S.G. Lasky
- Year defined: 1938
- Hidalgo Formation (the United States) Hidalgo Formation (New Mexico)

The Hidalgo Formation is a geologic formation of Maastrichtian age (latest Cretaceous) in southwestern New Mexico. It is of interest to geologists for the clues it preserves of the nature of Laramide deformation in the latest Cretaceous.

== Description ==
The formation is mostly basalt or andesite lava flows, but with some interbedded breccia and pyroclastic rock and, in some locations, up to 200 feet (61 m) of limestone and shale. The formation rests unconformably on the Ringbone Formation or Skunk Ranch Formation, and varies greatly in thickness, from 900 to 5,000 feet (270 to 1,520 m). Argon-argon dating gives a consistent age between 70.53 and 71.44 million years. The formation is overlain by the Rubio Peak Formation.

The formation is interpreted as a volcanic center located inland of the southwest coast of the Ringbone depositional basin that erupted during Laramide tectonic deformation that partitioned the basin. It may correlate with the Salero Formation of southeastern Arizona.

== History of investigation ==
The formation was first named the Hidalgo Volcanics by Samuel G. Lasky in 1978 for outcroups found throughout Hidalgo County, New Mexico.
