= Fort Crittenden Formation =

Late Cretaceous geological formation in Arizona

Coordinates: 31.8234°N 110.6404°W

- Stratigraphic range: Late Cretaceous
- Type: Geological formation
- Underlies: Salero Formation

Location
- Region: North America
- Country: United States

The Fort Crittenden Formation is a geological formation in Arizona whose strata date back to the Late Cretaceous. Dinosaur remains are among the fossils that have been recovered from the formation.

== Vertebrate paleofauna ==
=== Amphibians ===
Amphibians of the Fort Crittenden Formation
Genus	Species	Location	Stratigraphic position	Abundance	Notes
Opisthotriton	Indeterminate				
Scapherpeton	Indeterminate				

=== Archosaurs ===
Tyrannosauridae fossils attributed to Gorgosaurus have been unearthed here.

Archosaurs of the Fort Crittenden Formation
Genus	Species	Location	Stratigraphic position	Abundance	Notes	Images
Alligatoridae	Indeterminate			Known only from a single scute.	Paleontologists Robert M. Sullivan and Spencer G. Lucas questioned the referral to this specimen to Allognathosuchus in the formation because the referred remains were so scant and Allognathosuchus is confined to the Paleogene. They regarded the referred scute as belonging to an indeterminate alligatoroid.	Crittendenceratops
Hadrosauridae	Indeterminate				These teeth were attributed to Trachodon mirabilis in the past.	Crittendenceratops
Crittendenceratops	C. krzyzanowskii		A centrosaurine ceratopsid.			Crittendenceratops
cf. Richardoestesia	Indeterminate					Crittendenceratops
Dromaeosauridae	Indeterminate					Crittendenceratops

=== Bony fishes ===
Bony fishes of the Fort Crittenden Formation
Genus	Species	Location	Stratigraphic position	Abundance	Notes	Images
Melvius	Indeterminate					Pachyrhizodus
Pachyrhizodus	Indeterminate					Pachyrhizodus

=== Cartilaginous fishes ===
Cartilaginous fishes of the Fort Crittenden Formation
Genus	Species	Location	Stratigraphic position	Abundance	Notes
Myledaphus	M. bipartitus				

=== Lepidosaurs ===
Teiid and anguid lizards are known from the formation.

=== Turtles ===
Turtles of the Fort Crittenden Formation
Genus	Species	Location	Stratigraphic position	Abundance	Notes
Adocus					
Aspideretes					
Basilemys					
Plastomenus					

== See also ==
- List of dinosaur-bearing rock formations
