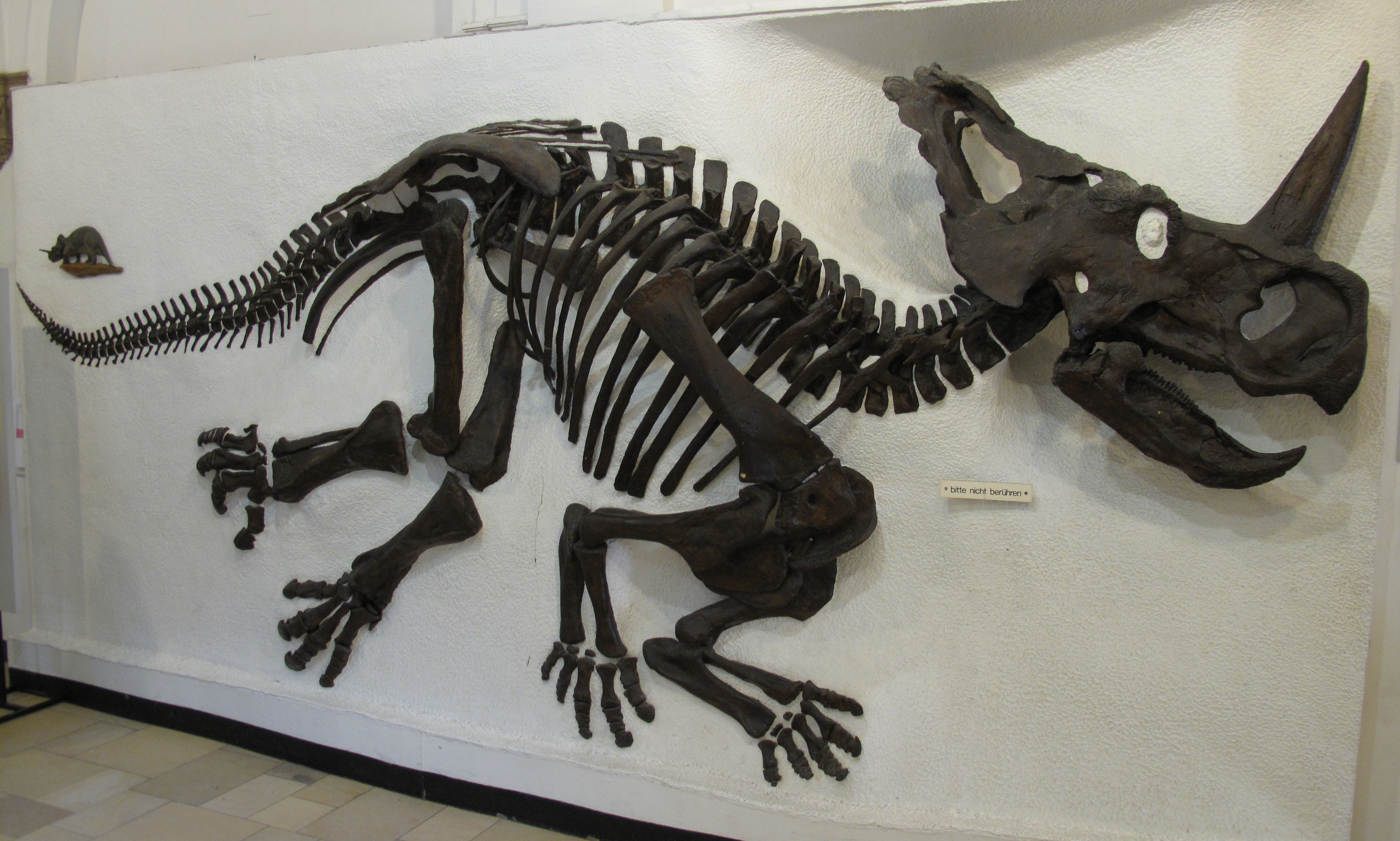
- Centrosaurus "nasicornus" skeleton, Palaeontological Museum Munich

Scientific classification
- Kingdom: Animalia
- Phylum: Chordata
- Class: Reptilia
- Clade: Dinosauria
- Clade: †Ornithischia
- Clade: †Ceratopsia
- Family: †Ceratopsidae
- Subfamily: †Centrosaurinae; Lambe, 1915

Type species
- †Centrosaurus apertus Lambe, 1904

Subgroups
- †Brachyceratops?; †Diabloceratops; †Machairoceratops; †Menefeeceratops; †Monoclonius; †Sinoceratops; †Wendiceratops; †Xenoceratops; †Albertaceratopsini Loewen et al., 2024; †Albertaceratops; †Lokiceratops; †Medusaceratops; †Nasutoceratopsini Ryan et al., 2017; †Avaceratops; †Crittendenceratops; †Furcatoceratops; †Nasutoceratops; †Yehuecauhceratops?; †Eucentrosaura Chiba et al., 2018; †Centrosaurini Ryan et al., 2017; †Centrosaurus; †Coronosaurus; †Spinops; †Styracosaurus?; †Pachyrhinosaurini Sternberg, 1950; †Einiosaurus; †Stellasaurus; †Styracosaurus?; †Pachyrostra Fiorillo & Tykoski, 2012; †Achelousaurus; †Pachyrhinosaurus

Synonyms
- Pachyrhinosaurinae Sternberg, 1950; Monocloniinae Nopcsa, 1923

= Centrosaurinae =

Centrosaurines Temporal range: Late Cretaceous, 82–68 Ma

Extinct subfamily of dinosaurs

Centrosaurinae (from the Greek, meaning "pointed lizards") is a subfamily of ceratopsid, a group of large quadrupedal ornithischian dinosaur. Centrosaurine fossil remains are known primarily from the northern region of Laramidia (modern day Alberta, Montana, and Alaska) but isolated taxa have been found in China and Utah as well.

Defining features of centrosaurines include a large nasal horn, short supratemporal horns, and an ornamented frill projecting from the back of the skull. With the exception of Centrosaurus apertus, all adult centrosaurines have spike-like ornaments midway up the skull. Morphometric analysis shows that centrosaurines differ from other ceratopsian groups in skull, snout, and frill shapes. There is evidence to suggest that male centrosaurines had an extended period of adolescence, and sexual ornamentation did not appear until adulthood.

Centrosaurinae was named by paleontologist Lawrence Lambe in 1915, with Centrosaurus as the type genus. It is defined in the PhyloCode as "the largest clade containing Centrosaurus apertus, but not Chasmosaurus belli and Triceratops horridus. The centrosaurines are further divided into three tribes: the Nasutoceratopsini, the Centrosaurini, and the Pachyrhinosaurini by Ryan et al (2016). Nasutoceratopsini is defined as "the largest clade containing Nasutoceratops titusi, but not Centrosaurus apertus. The remaining two tribes belong to the clade Eucentrosaura, defined as "the smallest clade containing Centrosaurus apertus and Pachyrhinosaurus canadensis". Centrosaurini is defined as "the largest clade containing Centrosaurus apertus, but not Pachyrhinosaurus canadensis" while Pachyrhinosaurini has the opposite definition consisting of "the largest clade containing Pachyrhinosaurus canadensis, but not Centrosaurus apertus". Most recently, Mark Loewen and colleagues in 2024 named the tribe Albertaceratopsini in their description of the new species Lokiceratops rangiformis. It is defined as "all taxa more closely related to Albertaceratops nesmoi than to Centrosaurus apertus".

== Classification ==
The classification of centrosaurines and the relationships among the various species is complicated by a wide degree of variation between individuals and growth stages. Some features that have traditionally been used to classify these dinosaurs, like the number and arrangement of frill ornaments or spikes, have been discovered to be more variable than previously thought. For example, the cladogram presented below follows a 2016 phylogenetic analysis by Chiba et al. (2017). These authors treated the species Rubeosaurus ovatus as distinct from Styracosaurus albertensis, and recovered several distinct clades within Centrosaurini, which together formed a sister group to the Pachyrhinosaurini:

- Centrosaurinae
  - - Diabloceratops eatoni
    - Machairoceratops cronusi
  - - Nasutoceratopsini
      - Avaceratops lammersi (ANSP 15800)
      - MOR 692
      - CMN 8804
      - Nasutoceratops titusi
      - Malta new taxon
    - - Xenoceratops foremostensis
      - - - Sinoceratops zhuchengensis
          - Wendiceratops pinhornensis
        - Albertaceratops nesmoi
        - Medusaceratops lokii
        - Eucentrosaura
          - Centrosaurini
            - - Rubeosaurus ovatus
              - Styracosaurus albertensis
            - - Coronosaurus brinkmani
              - - Centrosaurus apertus
                - Spinops sternbergorum
          - Pachyrhinosaurini
            - Einiosaurus procurvicornis
            - Pachyrostra
              - Achelousaurus horneri
              - - Pachyrhinosaurus canadensis
                - - Pachyrhinosaurus lakustai
                  - Pachyrhinosaurus perotorum

However, subsequent studies have cast doubt on the usefulness of minor variations in frill spike arrangement for classifying centrosaurines. In particular, large sample sizes of the species Centrosaurus apertus and Styracosaurus albertensis have shown a higher than predicted amount of variation. In 2020, Holmes et al. explored what the effect of recognizing such diversity would have on centrosaur classification. They used the same data as Chiba et al.'s 2017 study, but treated Rubeosaurus as a synonym of Styracosaurus, dropping it from their taxon list. The resulting cladogram (below) found Centrosaurini as a polytomy, a grouping with no discernable sister group relationships within it. The authors concluded that this meant the variation present within these species made it difficult to find any real resolution among them, and may even provide support for the hypothesis that centrosaurines evolved primarily via anagenesis (a single lineage changing through time) rather than cladogenesis (multiple branching lineages with shared common ancestors).

- Centrosaurinae
  - - Nasutoceratopsini
  - - Coronosaurus brinkmani
    - Centrosaurus apertus
    - Spinops sternbergorum
    - Styracosaurus albertensis
    - Pachyrhinosaurini
      - Einiosaurus procurvicornis
      - Pachyrostra
        - Achelousaurus horneri
        - Pachyrhinosaurus

Pachyrhinosaurini was defined in 2012 by Fiorillo & Tykoski. It was defined as all centrosaurine ceratopsids more closely related to Pachyrhinosaurus canadensis than to Centrosaurus apertus. It was defined during the description of Pachyrhinosaurus perotorum, a species from Alaska. The substituent clade Pachyrostra, compromising centrosaurs with bossed instead of horned noses, is defined as "the least inclusive clade including both Pachyrhinosaurus canadensis and Achelousaurus horneri.

== Biogeography ==
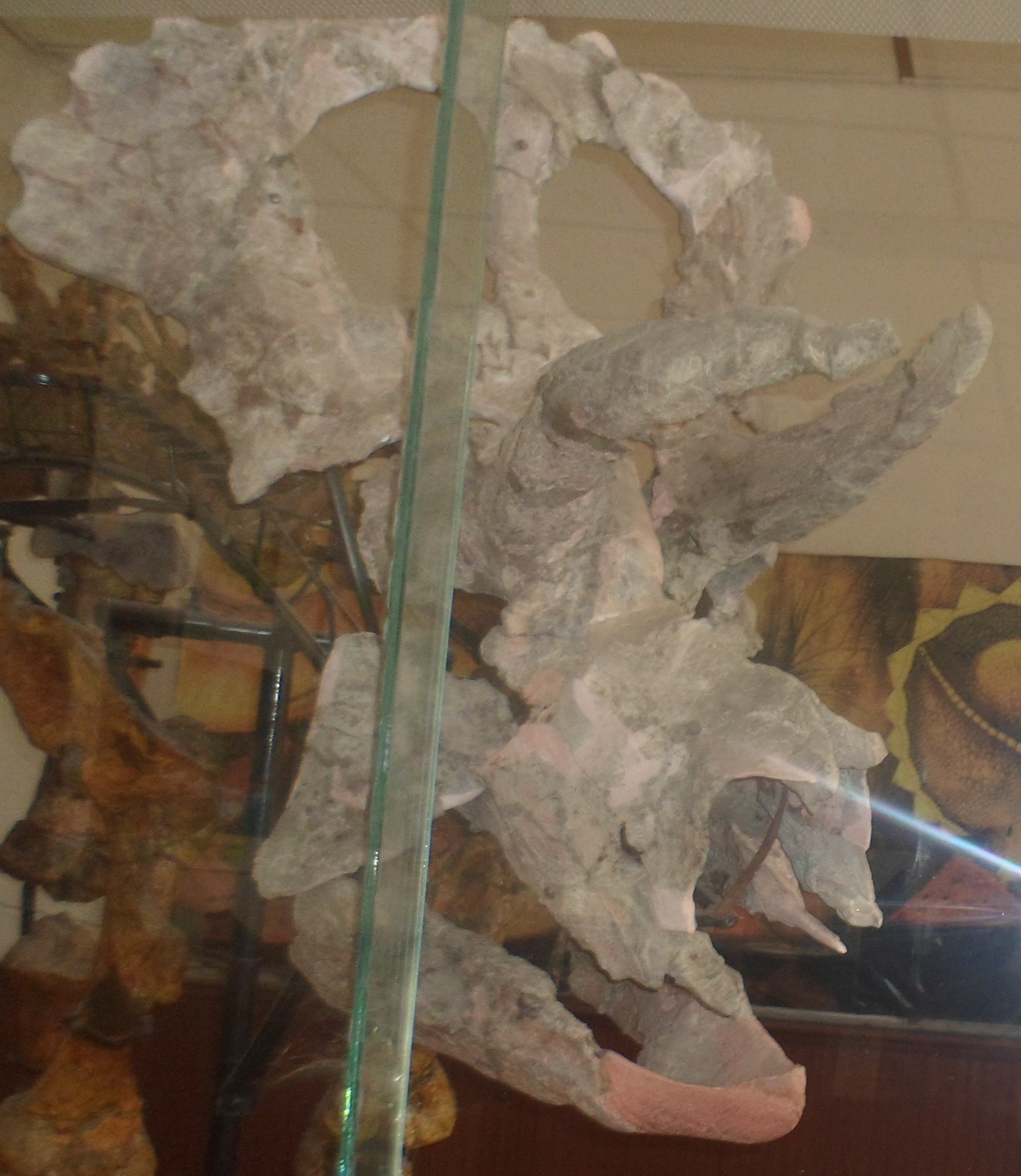
Skull of an unnamed nasutoceratopsin exhibited in the Museo del Mamuth in Chihuahua City, from the municipality of Aldama

Centrosaurine fossils have mostly been found in Western North America (Alberta, Montana, and Alaska). In the United States, two taxa, Diabloceratops and Machairoceratops, have been found as far south as Utah. Yehuecauhceratops, a nasutoceratopsin from Coahuila, Mexico, is the southernmost occurrence of a centrosaurine in North America. No centrosaurine fossils had been uncovered outside Western North America until the 2010 discovery of Sinoceratops in the Shandong Province of China. However, some authors question the placement of Sinoceratops within Centrosaurinae. All other Late Cretaceous dinosaur groups from North America have also been found in Asia, so the initial absence of Asian centrosaurines had been surprising. The current evidence suggests that Centrosaurinae originated in Laramidia 90-80 million years ago, with the discovery of the oldest known centrosaurine, Menefeeceratops further proving this. This means Sinoceratops would have migrated to China from North America. Some hypothesize that centrosaurines originated in southern Laramidia and later radiated north.

== Body size ==
Compared to their sister group, Chasmosaurinae, centrosaurines are relatively small. The primitive Sinoceratops is an exception, with an estimated skull length of 180 centimetres (71 in). By contrast, the skull length of Albertoceratops was more typical for this group at only 67 centimetres (26 in). In general, centrosaurines were about the size of a rhinoceros with body lengths ranging from 2.5–8 metres (8.2–26.2 ft).

== Reproduction ==
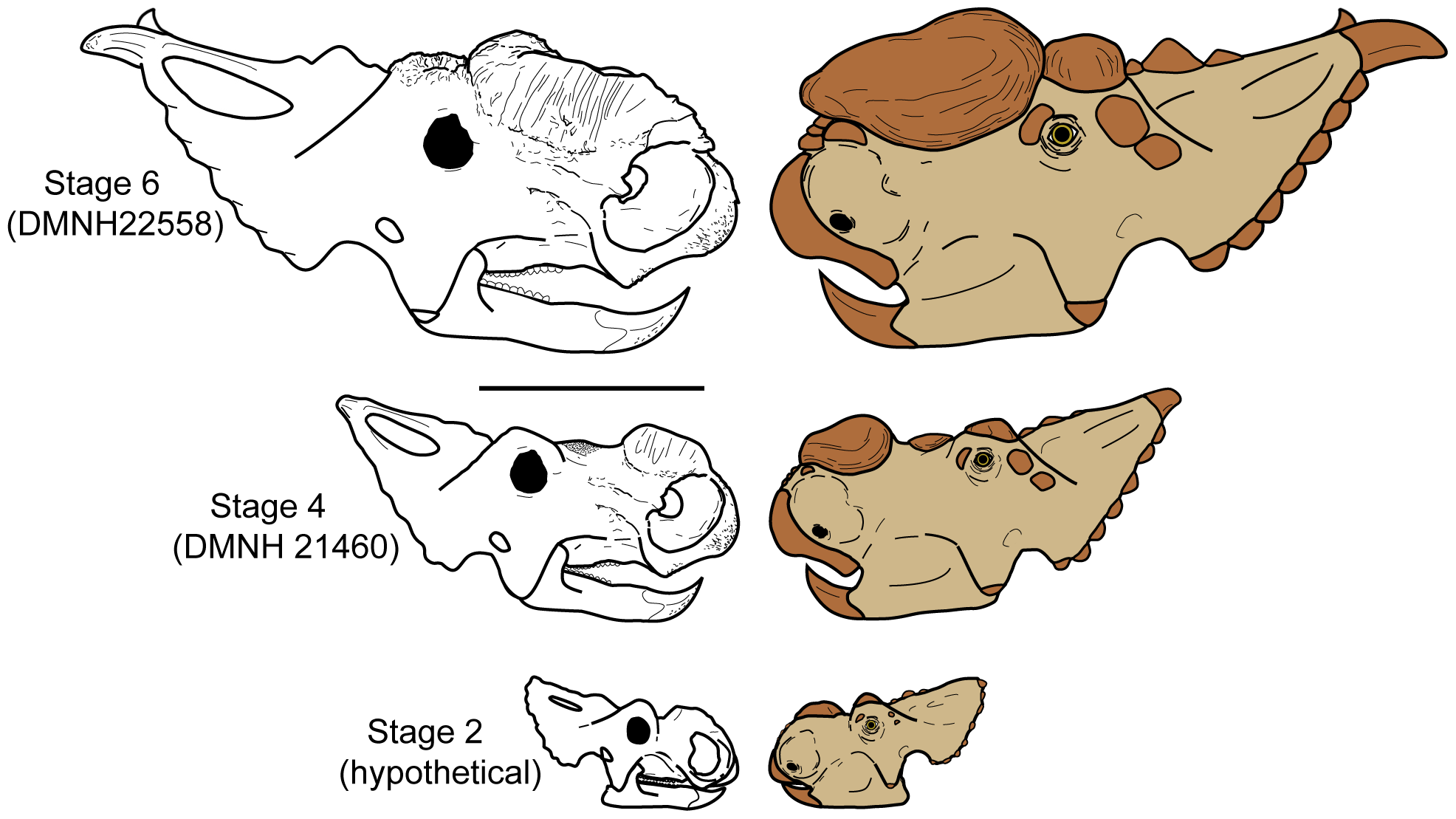
Hypothesised ontogenic development of Pachyrhinosaurus perotorum

Possible neonate sized centrosaurine fossils have been documented in the scientific literature. Research indicates that centrosaurines did not achieve fully developed mating signals until nearly fully grown. Scott D. Sampson found commonality between the slow growth of mating signals in centrosaurines and the extended adolescence of animals whose social structures are ranked hierarchies founded on age-related differences. In these sorts of groups, young males are typically sexually mature for several years before actually beginning to breed, when their mating signals are most fully developed. Females, by contrast, do not have such an extended adolescence.

== See also ==
- Timeline of ceratopsian research
