= Cowboy Spring Formation =

Geologic formation in New Mexico and Arizona

- Stratigraphic range: late Cretaceous
- Type: Formation
- Underlies: Timberlake Formation
- Overlies: Mojado Formation
- Thickness: Over 1,000 feet (300 m)

Lithology
- Primary: Limestone conglomerate
- Other: Sandstone, shale, claystone, tuff

Location
- Coordinates: 31.6085°N 108.6362°W
- Region: New Mexico
- Country: United States

Type section
- Named for: Cowboy Spring
- Named by: Zeller and Alper
- Year defined: 1965
- Cowboy Spring Formation (the United States) Cowboy Spring Formation (New Mexico)

The Cowboy Spring Formation is a geologic formation in southwestern New Mexico and southeastern Arizona. It preserves fossils dating back to the late Cretaceous period.

== Description ==
The formation is primarily limestone cobble conglomerate. The massive conglomerate beds are separated by thinner beds of sandstone, shale, claystone, and tuff. The clasts in the conglomerate are of Cretaceous age and contain the foraminiferan Orbitolina and other common Cretaceous fossils. These are embedded in a red arkosic matrix. The sandstones are also mostly red and arkosic and the shale is mostly bright red. The formation interfingers with the underlying Mojado Formation, is overlain with angular unconformity by the Timberlake Formation, and has a total thickness of at least 1,000 feet (300 m).

A single latite tuff bed some 20 feet (6.1 m) is exposed in the formation.

The formation was deposited in the Little Hat Top basin, which was produced by Laramide deformation on the southwest flank of the Hidalgo uplift.

== History of investigation ==
The formation was first named by Zeller and Alper in 1965 for a single outcrop in the Animas Mountains. By 1970, it had been traced into southeastern Arizona Elston and Erb recommended merging the formation with the overlying Timberlake Formation due to lack of a clear lithological distinction, but this has not been universally accepted.
