= Ringbone Formation =

Geologic formation in New Mexico

- Stratigraphic range: Campanian; ~84–71 Ma
- Type: Geological formation
- Underlies: Hidalgo Formation
- Overlies: Mojado Formation
- Thickness: 7,500 feet (2,300 m)

Lithology
- Primary: Mudstone
- Other: Sandstone

Location
- Coordinates: 31.959°N 108.464°W
- Approximate paleocoordinates: 39.3°N 80.7°W
- Region: New Mexico
- Country: United States

Type section
- Named for: Ringbone Ranch
- Named by: S.G. Lasky
- Year defined: 1938
- Ringbone Formation (the United States) Ringbone Formation (New Mexico)

The Ringbone Formation is a Campanian geologic formation in southwestern New Mexico.

== Description ==
The base of the formation is a conglomerate with boulders up to 2.5 feet (0.76 m) in diameter. The bulk of the formation is dark shale with minor sandstone and black limestone. The upper beds are tuffaceous sandstone with minor black limestone. A basalt flow and an andesite breccia are present in the upper beds. The total thickness is about 7,500 feet (2,300 m). The formation interfingers with the underlying Mojado Formation and is overlain by the Hidalgo Formation.

== Fossils ==
The formation contains fossils of the gastropod Physa, the palm Sabal, and other fossils consistent with Campanian age.

Dinosaur remains of tyrannosaurs and hadrosaurs are among the fossils that have been recovered from the formation. These include possible remains of Albertosaurus and a hadrosaur tail skin impression.

== History of investigation ==
The formation was first named as the Ringbone Shale by Lasky in 1938 for outcrops near Ringbone Ranch in the Little Hatchet Mountains. Zeller renamed the unit as the Ringbone Formation in 1970.

== See also ==
- List of dinosaur-bearing rock formations
  - List of stratigraphic units with indeterminate dinosaur fossils
