= Salero Formation =

Geologic formation in Arizona, United States

- Stratigraphic range: Campanian-Early Maastrichtian; ~74–70 Ma
- Type: Geological formation
- Overlies: Fort Crittenden Formation

Location
- Region: Arizona
- Country: United States

The Salero Formation is a Late Cretaceous geologic formation in the United States. The formation is 70-74 million years old.

== See also ==
- Stratigraphy
- Volcanism
