= Mojado Formation =

Geologic formation in New Mexico, US

- Stratigraphic range: Albian
- Type: Formation
- Underlies: Cowboy Spring Formation
- Overlies: U-Bar Formation
- Thickness: 5,150–7,800 feet (1,570–2,380 m)

Lithology
- Primary: Sandstone
- Other: Shale, limestone, siltstone

Location
- Coordinates: 31.505910°N 108.387181°W
- Region: New Mexico
- Country: United States

Type section
- Named for: Mojado Pass
- Named by: R.A. Zeller Jr.
- Year defined: 1962
- Mojado Formation (the United States) Mojado Formation (New Mexico)

The Mojado Formation is a geologic formation in southwestern New Mexico. It preserves fossils dating back to the early Cretaceous period.

== Description ==
The formation consists mostly of sandstone and shale, with some limestone, and siltstone. It rests conformably on the U-Bar Formation and is unconformably overlain by the Cowboy Spring Formation.The total thickness is 5,150–7,800 feet (1,570–2,380 m).

Lucas and his coinvestigators assigned the formation to the Bisbee Group and divided it into the Fryingpan Spring, Sarten, Beartooth, and Rattlesnake Ridge members.

The Fryingpan Spring Member is interpreted as continental deltaic sedimentation. The Sarten Member is fluvial while the Rattlesnake Ridge Member represents a return to shallow marine conditions.

== Fossils ==
The formation contains fossil mollusks such as gastropods, ammonites, and pelecypod, foraminifera, and scaphopods. These date the formation to the late Albian.

== History of investigation ==
The formation name was first used by Zeller in 1962, but he did not formally name the formation until 1965. In 1998, Lucas and coinvestigators assigned the formation to the Bisbee Group and divided it into the Fryingpan Spring, Sarten, Beartooth, and Rattlesnake Ridge members. However, Lawton abandoned the Beartooth Member in 2004.

== See also ==
- List of fossiliferous stratigraphic units in New Mexico
- Paleontology in New Mexico
