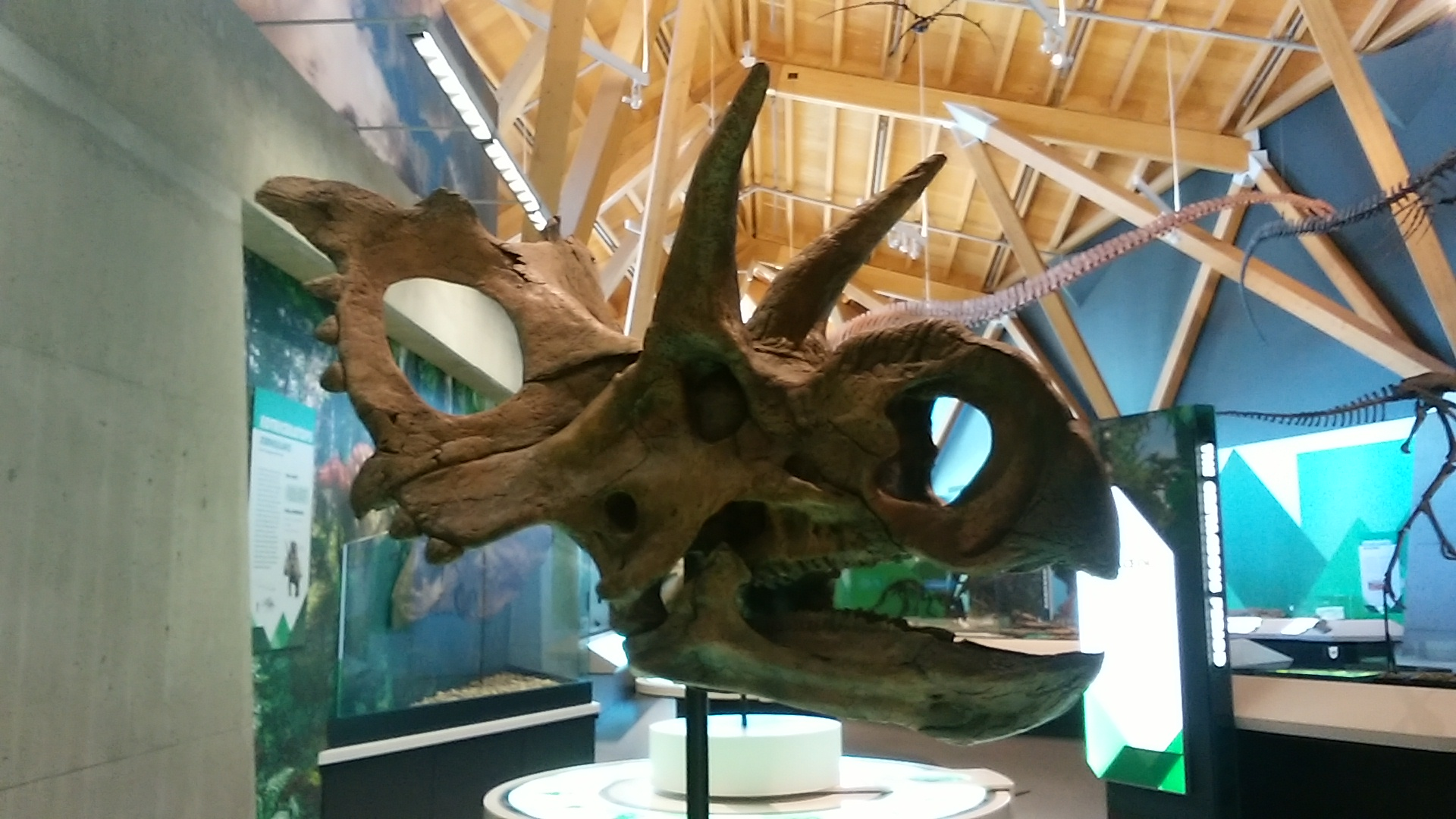
- Reconstructed skull

Scientific classification
- Kingdom: Animalia
- Phylum: Chordata
- Class: Reptilia
- Clade: Dinosauria
- Clade: †Ornithischia
- Clade: †Ceratopsia
- Family: †Ceratopsidae
- Subfamily: †Centrosaurinae
- Genus: †Xenoceratops; Ryan, Evans & Shepherd, 2012

Type species
- †Xenoceratops foremostensis Ryan, Evans & Shepherd, 2012

= Xenoceratops =

Xenoceratops Temporal range: Late Cretaceous, 80.3–79.5 Ma

Genus of ceratopsian dinosaurs

Xenoceratops (meaning "alien horned face") is a genus of centrosaurine ceratopsid dinosaur known from the Late Cretaceous (middle Campanian stage), and is known to have lived in what is currently Alberta, Canada. The genus has one known species, Xenoceratops foremostensis, after its place of discovery, the Foremost Formation.

== Discovery ==
In 1958, Wann Langston, Jr. excavated skull fragments from the Foremost Formation near Foremost, Alberta. The formation is very poorly understood in regards to dinosaur fauna; aside from teeth, only hadrosaur skeletons and the pachycephalosaurid Colepiocephale have been reported.

Langston stored the fragments in cabinets at the Canadian Museum of Nature in Ottawa. Around 2003, David C. Evans and Michael J. Ryan became curious about the specimens, and more thorough investigation was conducted in 2009. They discovered it to be a new species and genus, and it was described in 2012 by Ryan, Evans, and Kieran M. Shepherd. At the time of discovery, Xenoceratops foremostensis was the oldest known taxon of ceratopsid dinosaur in Canada. It is also the first ceratopsian described from the Foremost Formation. Xenoceratops is named from the Greek xenos, meaning foreign or alien, and ceratops, meaning horned face. The combination is in reference to the lack of ceratopsian species known from the Foremost Formation. The specific epithet foremostensis is named after the town of Foremost, Alberta.

== Description ==
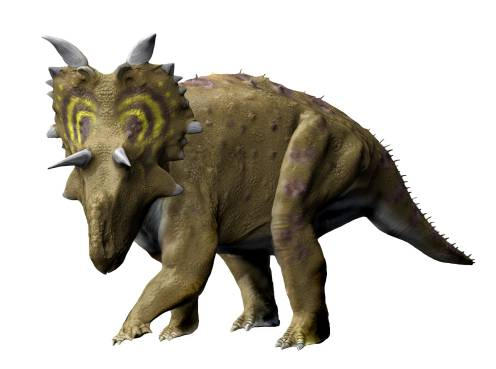
Restoration

Xenoceratops is based on CMN (Canadian Museum of Nature) 53282, a parietal. This is a skull bone that in ceratopsids makes up the medial (midline) and part of the lateral borders of the distinctive bony frill. Additional skull bones have also been assigned to the genus, including additional parietals, squamosals (bones which make up the rest of the frill's lateral borders), and a partial nasal. These bones appear to belong to at least three adult-sized individuals. Another fragmentary skull in the collections of the Royal Tyrrell Museum of Palaeontology is thought to belong to this genus as well.

Xenoceratops can be distinguished from other ceratopsids by details of the frill's bony ornamentation. The two bony projections closest to the midline of the frill are thick knobs, oriented toward the midline. Next to each knob is a single long flattened straight spike pointing laterally and to the rear. The anterior corners of the parietal have a large triangular knob. Unlike most other centrosaurines, the midline bar of the frill has no bumps or other ornamentation. Xenoceratops probably had a nasal and brow horn configuration comparable to that of other basal centrosaurines. The holotype and associated skull material do not include much of the face, but the Royal Tyrrell skull shows evidence of large brow horns, perhaps similar to those of Albertaceratops and Diabloceratops. Similarly, the form of the nasal bone fragment suggests a long, low structure like that of Medusaceratops.

== Classification ==
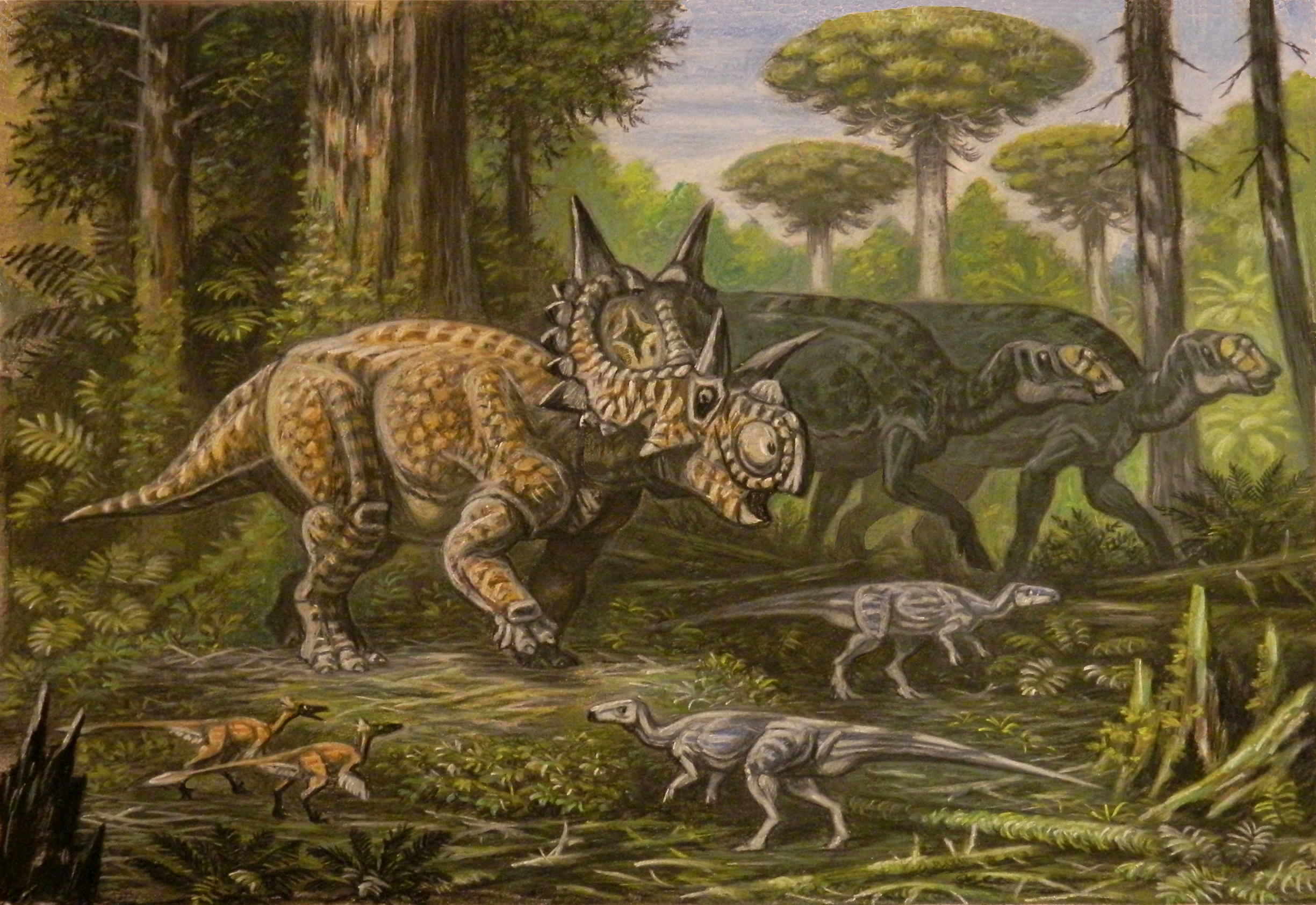
Xenoceratops and other dinosaurs in their environment

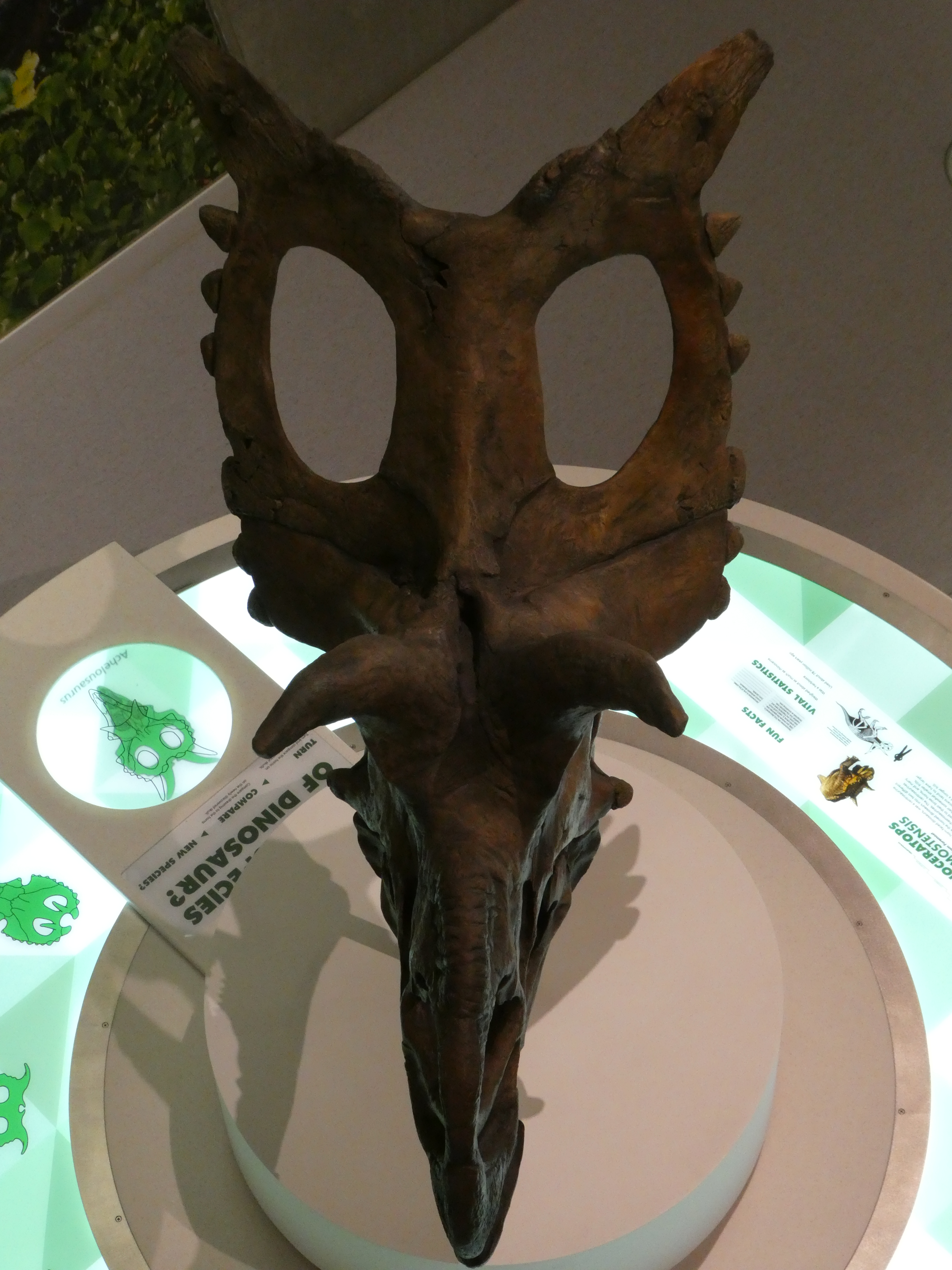
Skull seen from the front

The cladogram below follows a phylogenetic analysis by Chiba et al. (2017):

- Centrosaurinae
  - - Diabloceratops eatoni
    - Machairoceratops cronusi
  - - Nasutoceratopsini
      - Avaceratops lammersi (ANSP 15800)
      - MOR 692
      - CMN 8804
      - Nasutoceratops titusi
      - Malta new taxon
    - - Xenoceratops foremostensis
      - - - Sinoceratops zhuchengensis
          - Wendiceratops pinhornensis
        - Albertaceratops nesmoi
        - Medusaceratops lokii
        - Eucentrosaura
          - Centrosaurini
            - - Rubeosaurus ovatus
              - Styracosaurus albertensis
            - - Coronosaurus brinkmani
              - Spinops sternbergorum
              - Centrosaurus apertus
          - Pachyrhinosaurini
            - Einiosaurus procurvicornis
            - Pachyrostra
              - Achelousaurus horneri
              - - Pachyrhinosaurus canadensis
                - - Pachyrhinosaurus lakustai
                  - Pachyrhinosaurus perotorum

== See also ==
- Timeline of ceratopsian research
