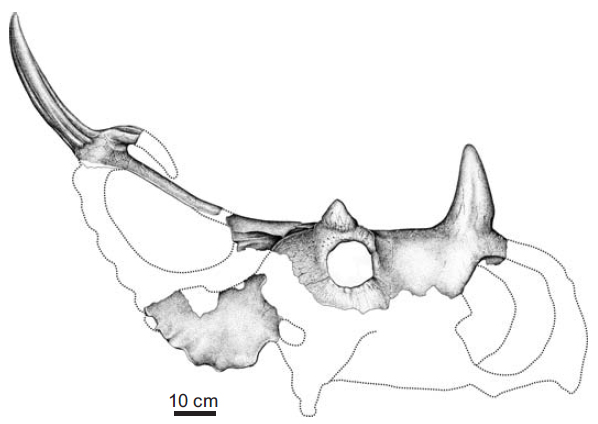
- Skull reconstruction

Scientific classification
- Kingdom: Animalia
- Phylum: Chordata
- Class: Reptilia
- Clade: Dinosauria
- Clade: †Ornithischia
- Clade: †Ceratopsia
- Family: †Ceratopsidae
- Subfamily: †Centrosaurinae
- Tribe: †Centrosaurini
- Genus: †Spinops; Farke et al., 2011
- Species: †S. sternbergorum

Binomial name
- †Spinops sternbergorum Farke et al., 2011

= Spinops =

Spinops Temporal range: Late Cretaceous, 76.5 Ma

Extinct genus of dinosaurs

Spinops is an extinct genus of centrosaurine ceratopsian dinosaur from the Late Cretaceous of Alberta, southern Canada. It was a medium-sized ceratopsian, reaching 4.5 metres (15 ft) in length and 1.3 metric tons (1.4 short tons) in body mass.

== Discovery and naming ==
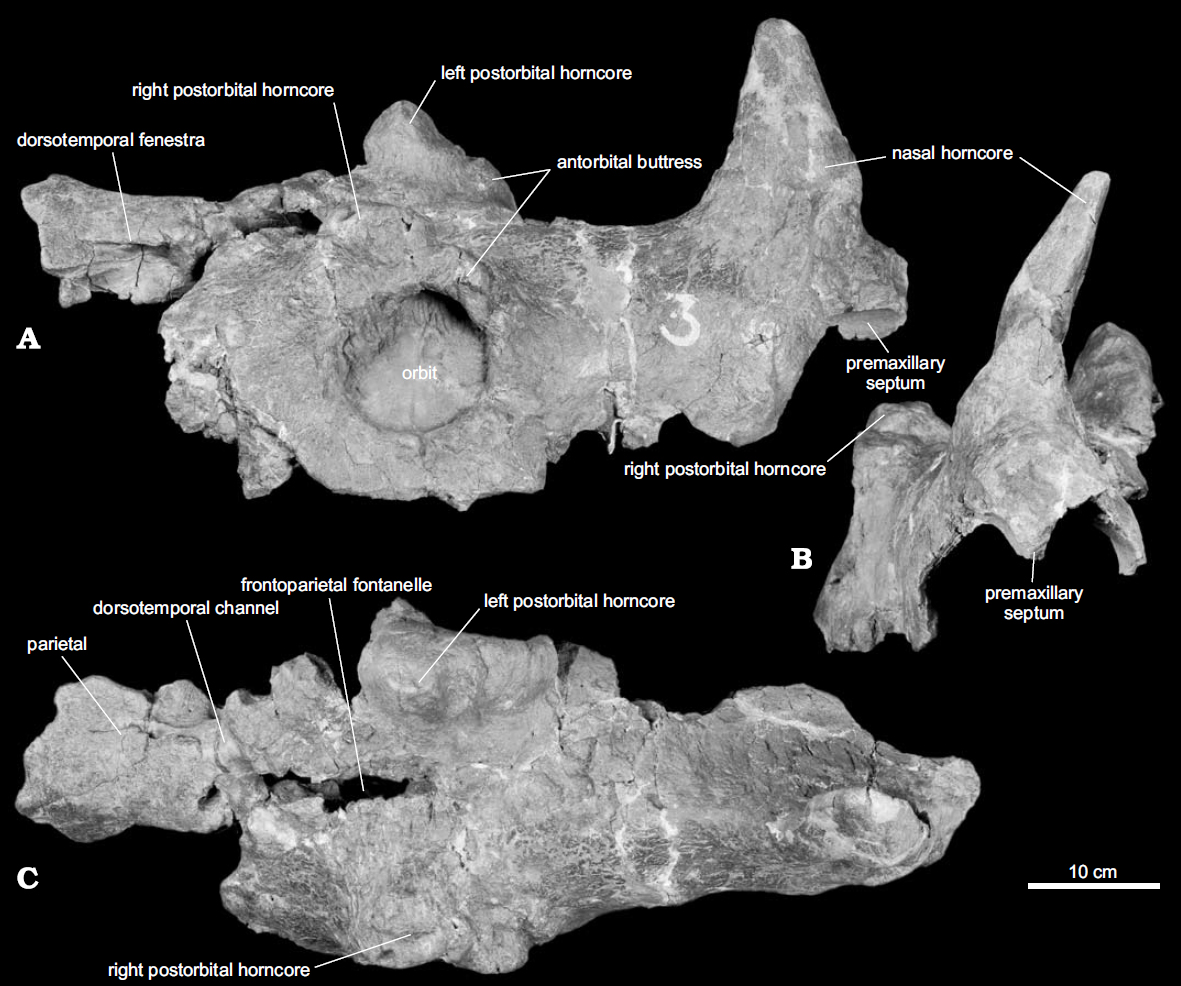
Partial skull in left side, front, and upper views

Spinops is known from the holotype NHMUK PV R 16307, a partial parietal bone, preserving most of the midline bar. Referred material include NHMUK PV R 16308, a partial parietal bone, partial dentary and unidentifiable limb fragments, NHMUK PV R 16306, an incomplete skull, preserving only the dorsal portion of the skull, and NHMUK PV R 16309, a partial right squamosal. None of this material was found in articulation, however it was all closely associated in the same bone bed, in the northwestern region ("Steveville Badlands") of the Dinosaur Provincial Park. Fossils of Spinops were first found in 1916, and were housed in the Natural History Museum in London. The material was not described until 2011, when the new species Spinops sternbergorum was erected. The material was probably collected from the upper part of the Oldman Formation or the lower part of the Dinosaur Park Formation, dating to the Campanian stage of the Late Cretaceous period.

Two partials skulls of Spinops were found in 1916, in a large bone bed near the Red Deer River of southern Alberta, by American commercial fossil collector Charles Hazelius Sternberg and his son Levi Sternberg. The fossils were sent to the Natural History Museum in London (then called the British Museum (Natural History)), which had financed the expedition. The museum considered the fossils too fragmentary to display, leaving them unprepared in the collections. In a letter to Charles H. Sternberg, English paleontologist Arthur Smith Woodward of the British Museum called the Spinops material "nothing but rubbish". The precise whereabouts of the bonebed that yielded the fossils is unknown due to poor field record keeping, but Darren Tanke of the Royal Tyrrell Museum is spearheading attempts at its relocation. The fossils were re-examined in 2011 by a team led by Dr Andrew A. Farke; which realized that the fossils represented an entirely new species of dinosaur.

Spinops was first named by Andrew A. Farke, Michael J. Ryan, Paul M. Barrett, Darren H. Tanke, Dennis R. Braman, Mark A. Loewen, and Mark R. Graham in 2011; the type species is Spinops sternbergorum. The generic name is derived from Latin spina, "spine", and Greek ops, "face", in reference to the unique ornamentation on the face. The specific name honours Charles H. and Levi Sternberg.

== Classification ==
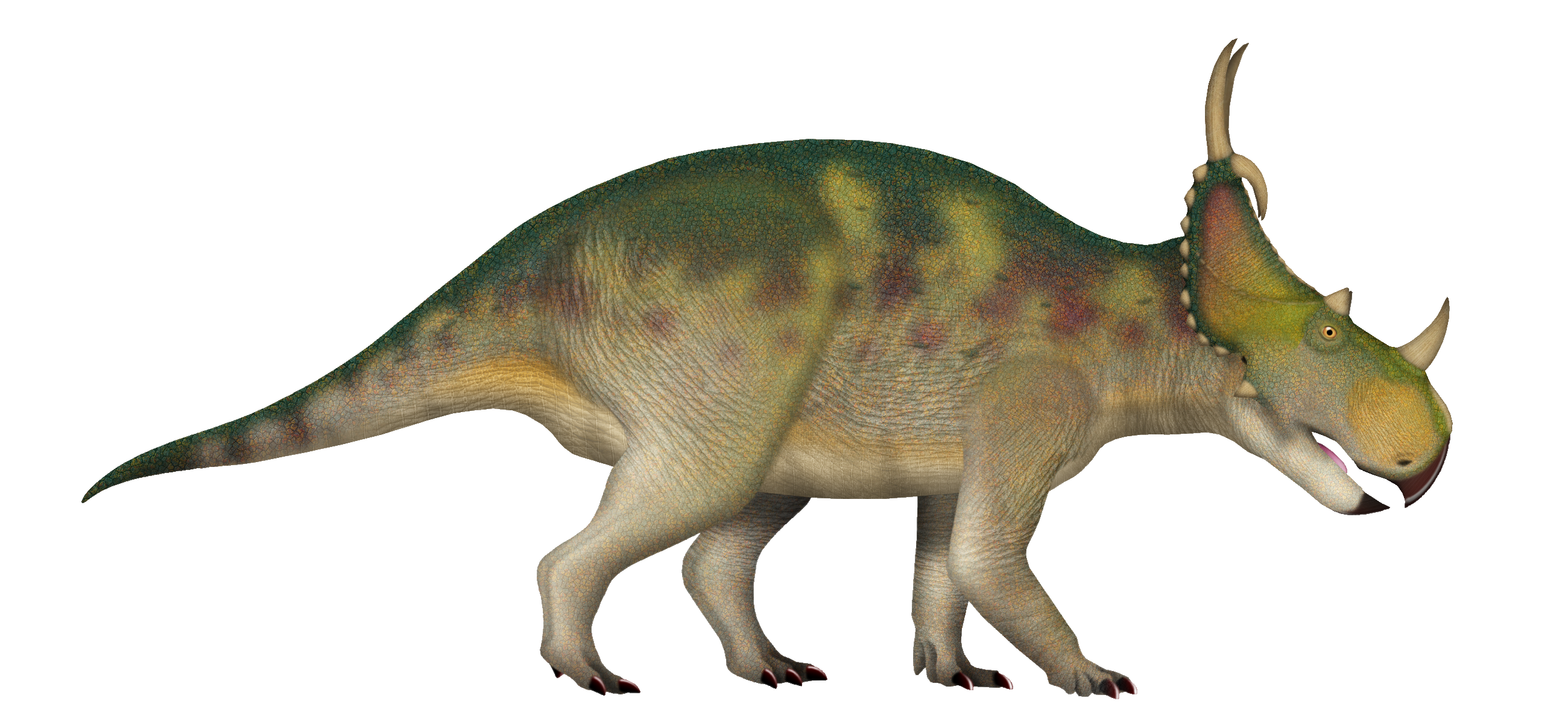
Restoration

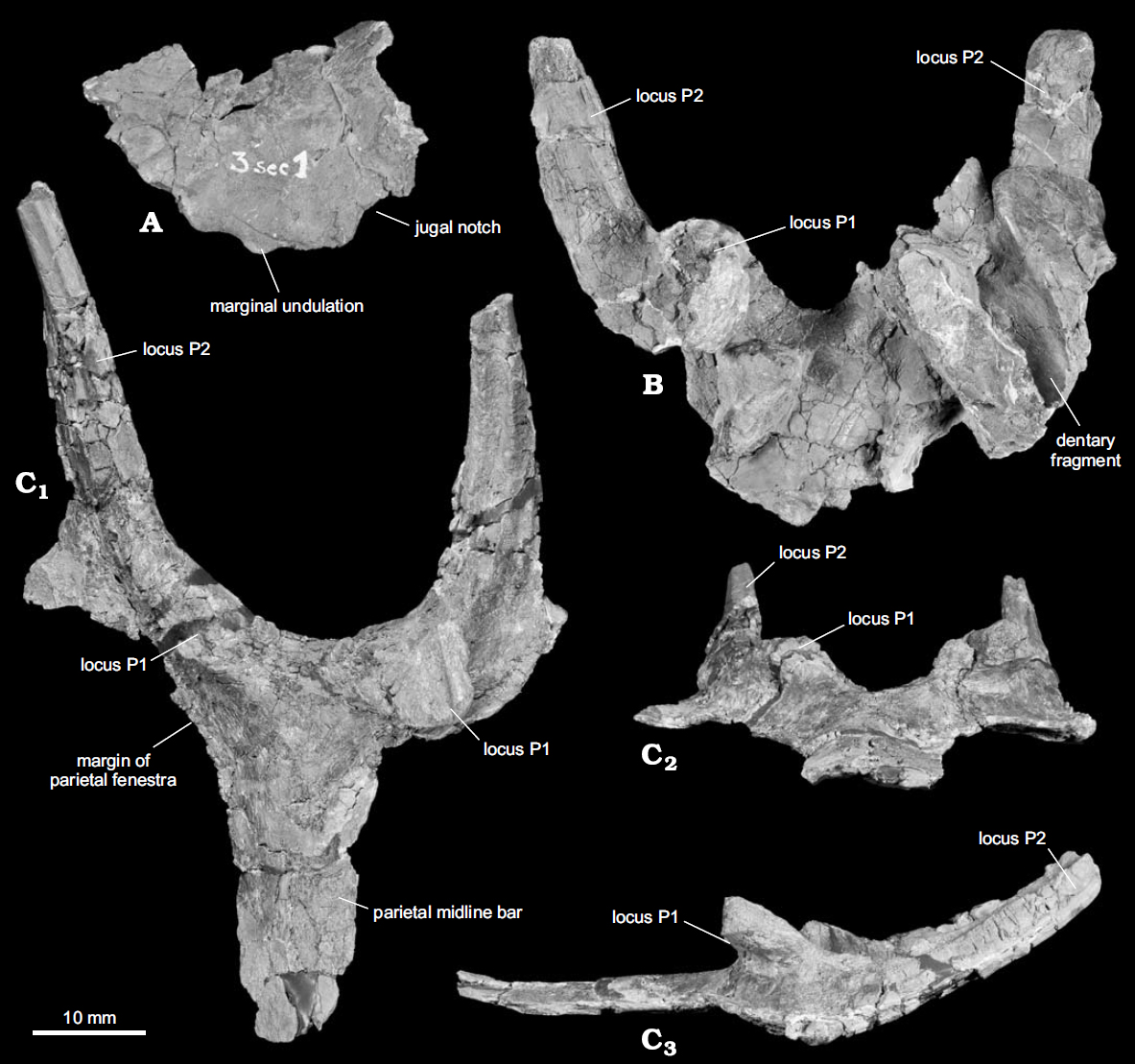
Squamosal and holotype parietal

The cladogram presented below follows a recent phylogenetic analysis by Chiba et al. (2017):

- Centrosaurinae
  - - Diabloceratops eatoni
    - Machairoceratops cronusi
  - - Nasutoceratopsini
      - Avaceratops lammersi (ANSP 15800)
      - MOR 692
      - CMN 8804
      - Nasutoceratops titusi
      - Malta new taxon
    - - Xenoceratops foremostensis
      - - - Sinoceratops zhuchengensis
          - Wendiceratops pinhornensis
        - Albertaceratops nesmoi
        - Medusaceratops lokii
        - Eucentrosaura
          - Centrosaurini
            - - Rubeosaurus ovatus
              - Styracosaurus albertensis
            - - Coronosaurus brinkmani
              - - Centrosaurus apertus
                - Spinops sternbergorum
          - Pachyrhinosaurini
            - Einiosaurus procurvicornis
            - Pachyrostra
              - Achelousaurus horneri
              - - Pachyrhinosaurus canadensis
                - - Pachyrhinosaurus lakustai
                  - Pachyrhinosaurus perotorum

== See also ==
- Timeline of ceratopsian research
