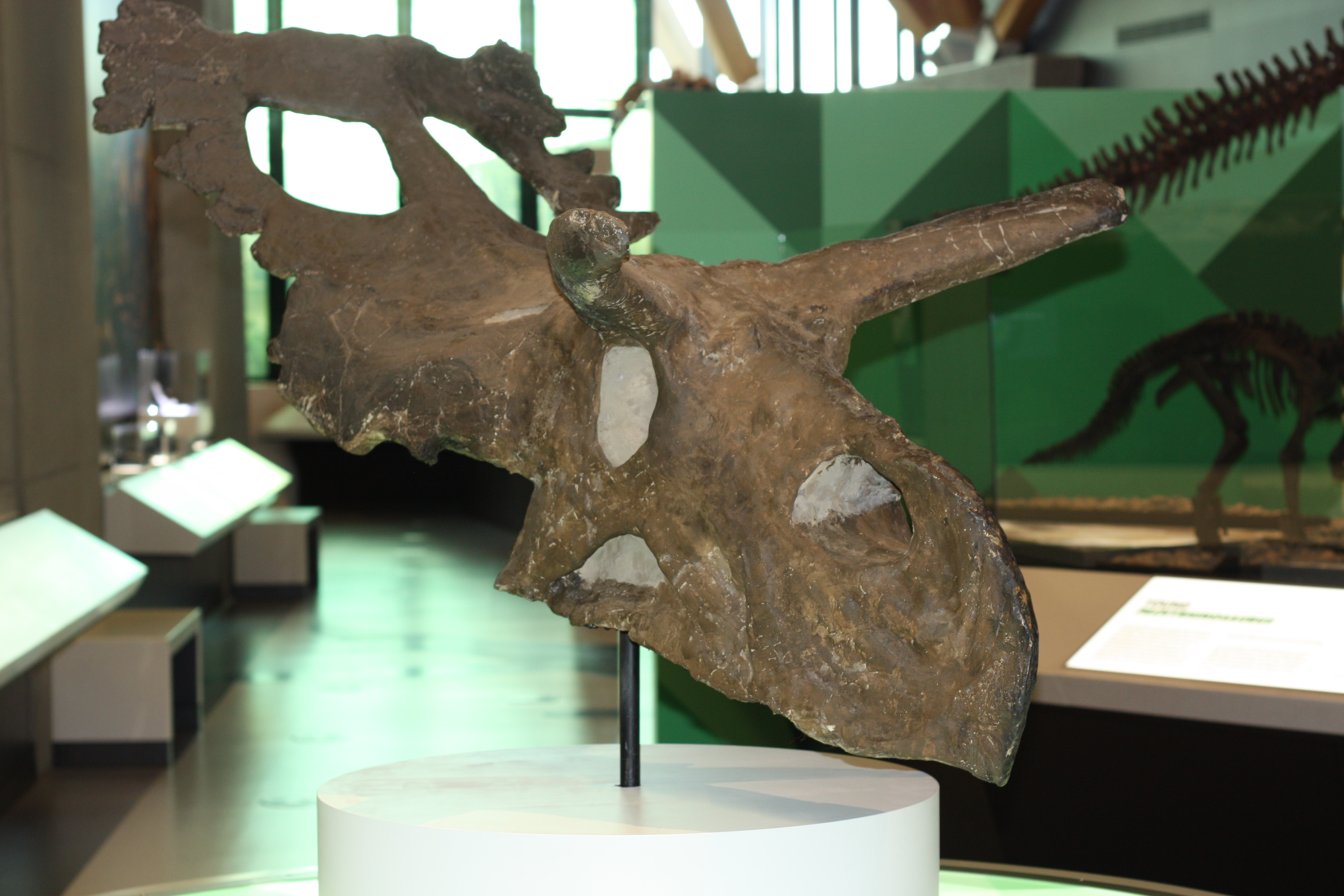
- Skull in Philip J. Currie Dinosaur Museum

Scientific classification
- Kingdom: Animalia
- Phylum: Chordata
- Class: Reptilia
- Clade: Dinosauria
- Clade: †Ornithischia
- Clade: †Ceratopsia
- Family: †Ceratopsidae
- Subfamily: †Centrosaurinae
- Clade: †Albertaceratopsini
- Genus: †Albertaceratops; Ryan, 2007
- Species: †A. nesmoi

Binomial name
- †Albertaceratops nesmoi Ryan, 2007

= Albertaceratops =

Albertaceratops Temporal range: Late Cretaceous, 77.5 Ma

Extinct genus of dinosaurs

Albertaceratops (meaning "Alberta horned face") is a genus of centrosaurine horned dinosaur from the middle Campanian-age Upper Cretaceous Oldman Formation of Alberta, Canada.

Albertaceratops is known from a nearly complete skull. Its most distinctive feature is the presence of long, robust brow horns, which are generally short in other centrosaurine dinosaurs. It also had an elongated bony ridge on its snout instead of a prominent nasal horn, as well as large projections extending outward from its neck frill.

In a phylogenetic analysis by Michael J. Ryan, Albertaceratops was classified as the most basal member of Centrosaurinae. Its skull demonstrates the combination of typical centrosaurine features with the long brow horns seen in other ceratopsian dinosaurs.

== Description ==
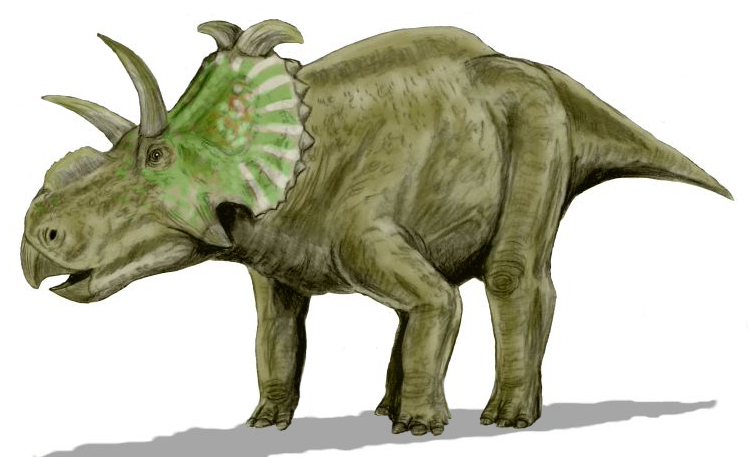
Restoration

Albertaceratops is unusual in combining long brow horns with an otherwise centrosaurine skull, as centrosaurines normally possess short brow horns. Over its nose was a bony ridge, and on its frill were two large outwardly-projecting hooks. Its size has been estimated at 5.8 metres (19 ft) and 3,500 kilograms (7,700 lb).

The long brow horns of Albertaceratops are a distinctive feature that sets it apart from other centrosaurine dinosaurs. These horns are an unusual feature among centrosaurines, which generally had short brow horns, and resemble the long brow horns found in chasmosaurines. This characteristic demonstrates that long supraorbital horns were not exclusive to chasmosaurines but also occurred in centrosaurines.

Its snout featured an elongated, rounded bony ridge rather than the prominent nasal horn commonly seen in other centrosaurines. Like other centrosaurines, it had projections along the edge of its neck frill, as well as a pair of large, thick, outward-pointing hook-like projections on the upper part of the frill. However, because some portions of the frill margin were not completely preserved, the exact number and shape of all the projections remain uncertain.

Albertaceratops was described on the basis of a nearly complete skull, while information about the rest of its skeleton, including its torso, remains limited. In a phylogenetic analysis conducted by Michael J. Ryan, the dinosaur was classified as the most basal member of Centrosaurinae. This is significant because it combines long brow horns with the characteristic cranial structure of centrosaurines.

== Discovery and naming ==
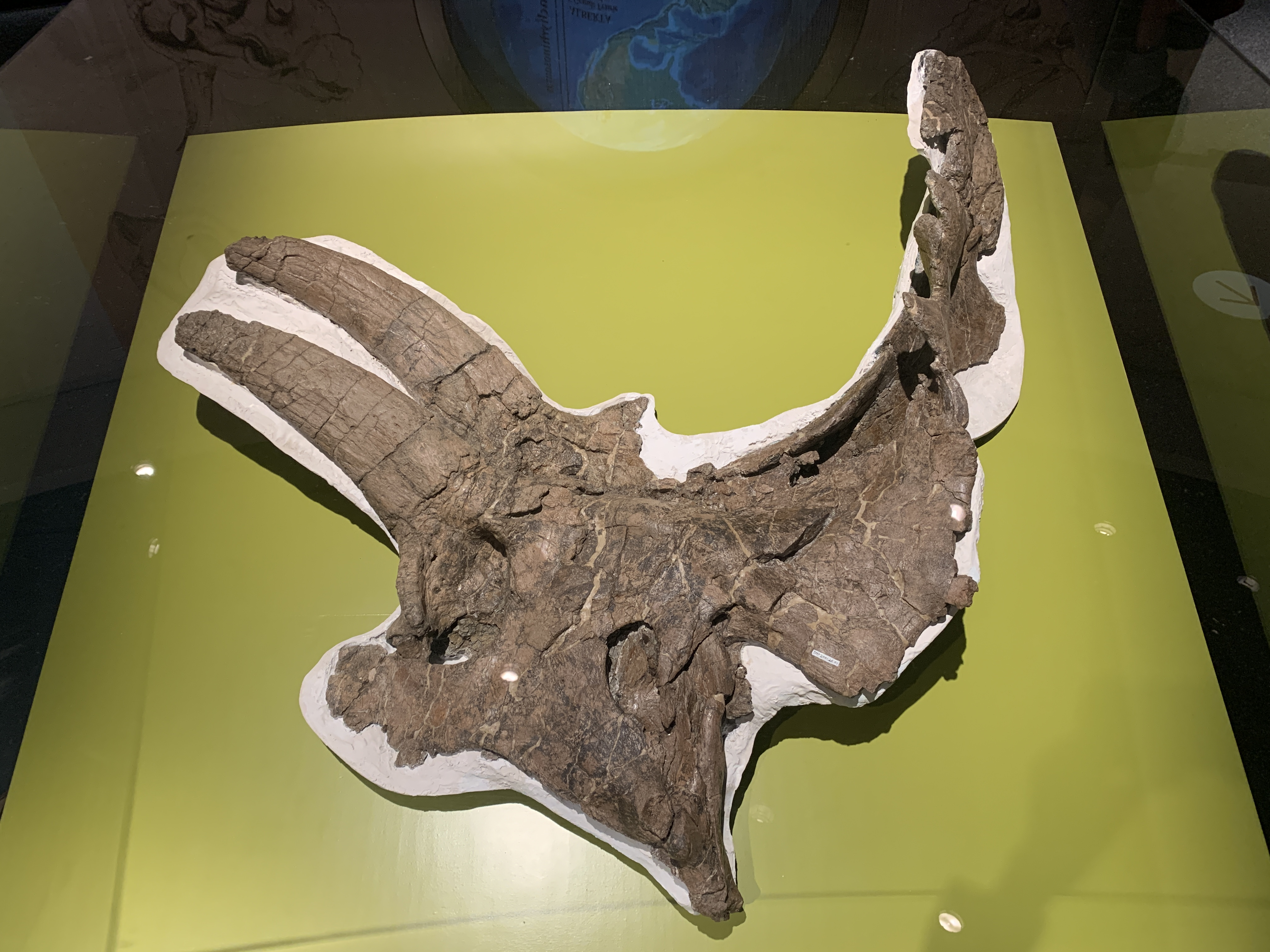
Skull of the Albertaceratops nesmoi holotype, TMP 2001.26.1

Albertaceratops is known from a single complete skull (TMP.2001.26.1) found in August 2001 and skull and postcranial fragments. A phylogenetic analysis carried out by its describer, Michael J. Ryan, found it to be the most basal centrosaurine. Additional specimens were reported from a bonebed in the Judith River Formation of Montana, which is equivalent to the Oldman Formation and differentiated only by the Canada–US border. However, further study showed these remains to come from a different centrosaurine, Medusaceratops. Both ceratopsids lived during the same time period, about 77.5 million years ago.

The specific name, A. nesmoi, is derived from the name of Cecil Nesmo, a rancher living in Manyberries, Alberta, a town of less than 100 people located 71 km south of Medicine Hat. The rancher was thus honored in recognition of his efforts to aid fossil hunters.

== Classification ==
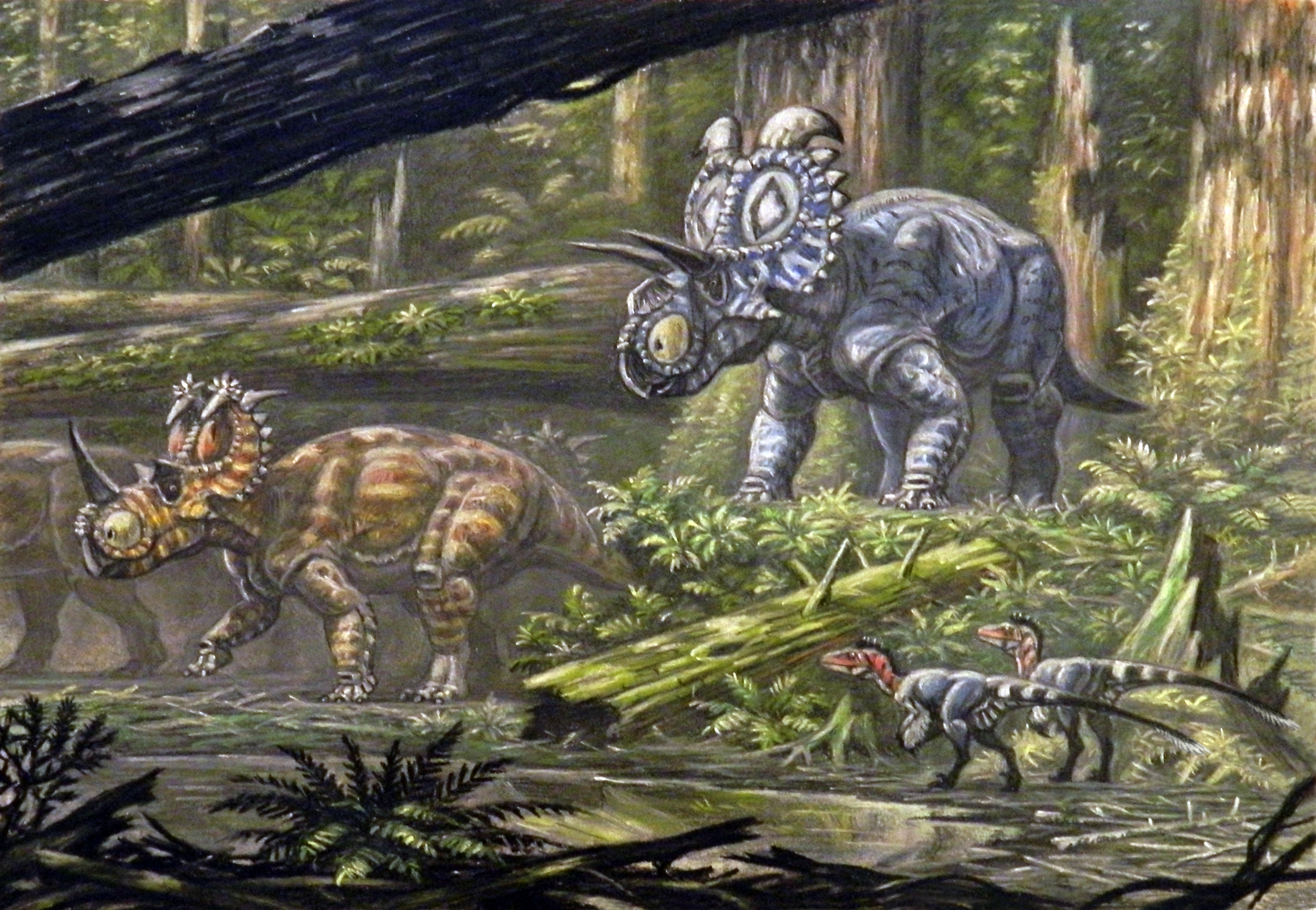
Coronosaurus and Albertaceratops in environment

Size of Albertaceratops compared to a human

The cladogram presented below follows a phylogenetic analysis by Chiba et al. (2017), which included a systematic re-evaluation of Medusaceratops lokii:

- Centrosaurinae
  - - Diabloceratops eatoni
    - Machairoceratops cronusi
  - - Nasutoceratopsini
      - Avaceratops lammersi (ANSP 15800)
      - MOR 692
      - CMN 8804
      - Nasutoceratops titusi
      - Malta new taxon
    - - Xenoceratops foremostensis
      - - - Sinoceratops zhuchengensis
          - Wendiceratops pinhornensis
        - Albertaceratops nesmoi
        - Medusaceratops lokii
        - Eucentrosaura
          - Centrosaurini
            - - Rubeosaurus ovatus
              - Styracosaurus albertensis
            - - Coronosaurus brinkmani
              - - Centrosaurus apertus
                - Spinops sternbergorum
          - Pachyrhinosaurini
            - Einiosaurus procurvicornis
            - Pachyrostra
              - Achelousaurus horneri
              - - Pachyrhinosaurus canadensis
                - - Pachyrhinosaurus lakustai
                  - Pachyrhinosaurus perotorum

== See also ==
- Timeline of ceratopsian research
