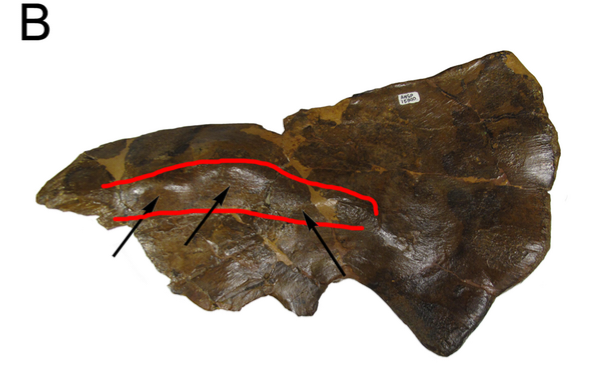
- Squamosal bone of A. lammersi

Scientific classification
- Domain: Eukaryota
- Kingdom: Animalia
- Phylum: Chordata
- Clade: Dinosauria
- Clade: †Ornithischia
- Clade: †Ceratopsia
- Family: †Ceratopsidae
- Subfamily: †Centrosaurinae
- Tribe: †Nasutoceratopsini
- Genus: †Avaceratops; Dodson, 1986
- Species: †A. lammersi

Binomial name
- †Avaceratops lammersi Dodson, 1986

= Avaceratops =

Avaceratops Temporal range: Late Cretaceous, 77 Ma

Extinct genus of ceratopsian dinosaurs

Avaceratops is a genus of small herbivorous ceratopsian dinosaurs which lived during the late Campanian in what are now the Northwest United States. Most fossils come from the Judith River Formation.

== Discovery and naming ==
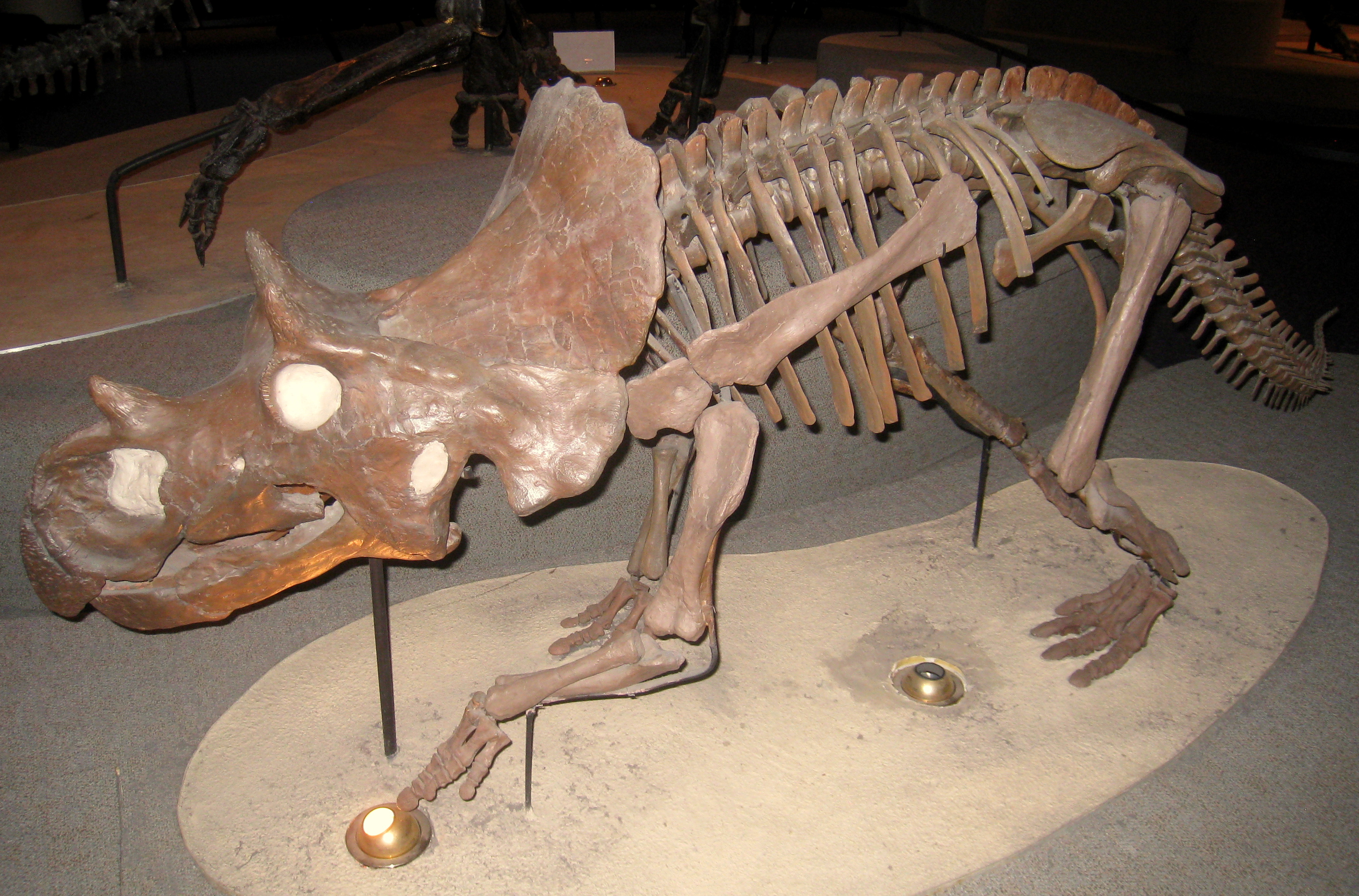
Reconstructed skeleton in the Academy of Natural Sciences, Philadelphia; it is now thought this genus did not have a nasal horn

The first remains of Avaceratops were found by Eddie Cole in the Judith River Formation of Montana, in 1981, on land of the Careless Creek Ranch, owned by rancher Arthur J. Lammers. They were preserved scattered throughout the remains of a prehistoric stream bed. This Avaceratops specimen was likely buried in the sandbar after its body was swept downstream by the current. The finds, displayed in Cole's fossil shop, were in October 1981 inspected by Peter Dodson who in July 1982 during a visit with Cole to the site discovered additional bones, which from 1984 were excavated by Anthony Fiorillo.

The fossil was formally named and described by Dodson in 1986, as the type species Avaceratops lammersi. It was the first ceratopsid named since Pachyrhinosaurus in 1950. The genus was named after Ava Cole, Eddie's wife. The specific epithet honors the Lammers family. In 1990 George Olshevsky emended the name to A. lammersorum, with the specific name in the genitive plural because it referred to several people. However, Dodson objected against this change, arguing the genitive singular might also refer to a single family name. In 1990 Thomas Lehman renamed A. lammersi into Monoclonius lammersi. This alternative name has found no acceptance.

The holotype, ANSP 15800, consists of a partial skeleton containing the lower skull, a left lower jaw, vertebrae, a complete shoulder girdle and most elements of forelimbs and hindlimbs. The type specimen might represent a juvenile or a subadult individual. While Dodson in 1986 was inclined to consider it almost fully grown, a 2019 histological analysis concluded that the animal was still experiencing the kind of rapid growth that would be expected from a centrosaurine in its first few years of life. Kenneth Carpenter made a reconstruction of the skull, a cast of which was by Leroy Glenn combined with restored parts of the postcranial skeleton to create a mount that in 1986 was displayed in the Academy of Natural Sciences in Philadelphia; a copy of this skeletal mount was donated to the Upper Musselshell Valley Historical Museum in Harlowton.

In 1993 Paul Penkalski referred two earlier found squamosals to Avaceratops, USNM 4802 and USNM 2415, of larger individuals. In 1999, Penkalski and Dodson described a second skull, MOR 692, again of a larger individual. This specimen includes the upper skull, with the nose and brow horns. However, the assignment of the latter to Avaceratops has been questioned due to differences in relative chronological position, skull morphology, and lack of intermediate forms; thus, Avaceratops is only represented by the type specimen.

== Description ==
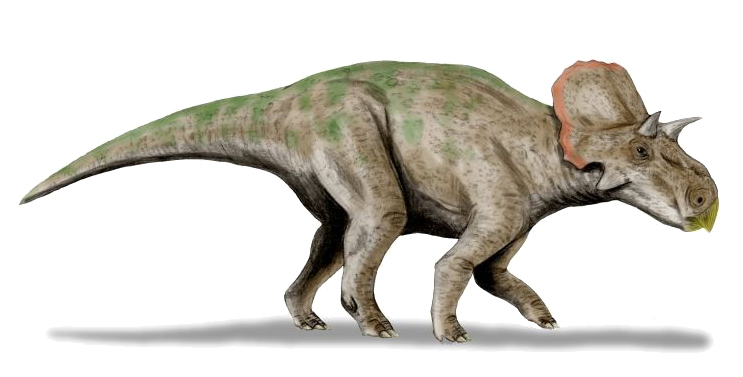
Life restoration

Avaceratops was originally by Dodson considered to have been an exceptionally small species. He estimated the holotype length at 2.3 metres (7.5 ft) and assumed it had almost attained adult size. The maturity of the animal was disputed by a 2019 histological analysis. In addition, a second skull (which does not necessarily belong to Avaceratops), MOR 692, indicates a body length of 4.2 metres (14 ft). Paul in 2010 estimated the weight of a four-metre-long animal at one tonne. Another change in the image of Avaceratops brought about by MOR 692 concerned the brow horns. These were first thought to be rather short, although this was purely speculative, the holotype not having preserved them. The new skull showed postorbital horn cores with a length of 25 centimetres (9.8 in).

Avaceratops has a distinctive frill at the back of the skull. The squamosal, the element at the front of the frill side, is large with a continuously curving instead of a stepped edge. A raised area at the base of the squamosal divides it into two equal halves, whereas more derived species have an enlarged top part. The squamosal is separated from the parietal bone at the rear of the skull by a small indentation. The parietals however, show no indentation at the midline of the frill rear. Also the parietals are probably lacking fenestrae which are typical of many other genera except Triceratops, resulting in a solid frill, although damage to the holotype allows for a small opening to be present.

== Classification ==
Size compared to a human

Avaceratops was by Dodson in 1986 assigned to the Ceratopsidae within the Ceratopsia (both names being derived from Ancient Greek for 'horned face'), a group of herbivorous dinosaurs with parrot-like beaks which thrived in what are now North America and Asia, during the Cretaceous Period.

Apart from being a ceratopsian, little is certain about Avaceratops's taxonomic position. Because most of the skeleton is only known from a juvenile, and juveniles tend to express ancestral traits more strongly, a cladistic analysis would likely indicate a too basal, low, position in the evolutionary tree. For this reason, Avaceratops has often been excluded from such analyses. Penkalski and Dodson in 1999 concluded that Avaceratops most likely occupied a basal position within the Centrosaurinae but that it was also possible it was a basal member of the Ceratopsinae or just outside the clade formed by both groups. A phylogenetic analysis performed by Sampson et al. (2013) found that Avaceratops was the sister taxon of the new genus Nasutoceratops, described and named in 2013. This clade containing both Avaceratops and Nasutoceratops was named the Nasutoceratopsini in 2016.

The cladogram presented below follows a phylogenetic analysis by Chiba et al. (2017):

- Centrosaurinae
  - - Diabloceratops eatoni
    - Machairoceratops cronusi
  - - Nasutoceratopsini
      - Avaceratops lammersi (ANSP 15800)
      - MOR 692
      - CMN 8804
      - Nasutoceratops titusi
      - Malta new taxon
    - - Xenoceratops foremostensis
      - - - Sinoceratops zhuchengensis
          - Wendiceratops pinhornensis
        - Albertaceratops nesmoi
        - Medusaceratops lokii
        - Eucentrosaura
          - Centrosaurini
            - - Rubeosaurus ovatus
              - Styracosaurus albertensis
            - - Coronosaurus brinkmani
              - - Centrosaurus apertus
                - Spinops sternbergorum
          - Pachyrhinosaurini
            - Einiosaurus procurvicornis
            - Pachyrostra
              - Achelousaurus horneri
              - - Pachyrhinosaurus canadensis
                - - Pachyrhinosaurus lakustai
                  - Pachyrhinosaurus perotorum

== Paleobiology ==
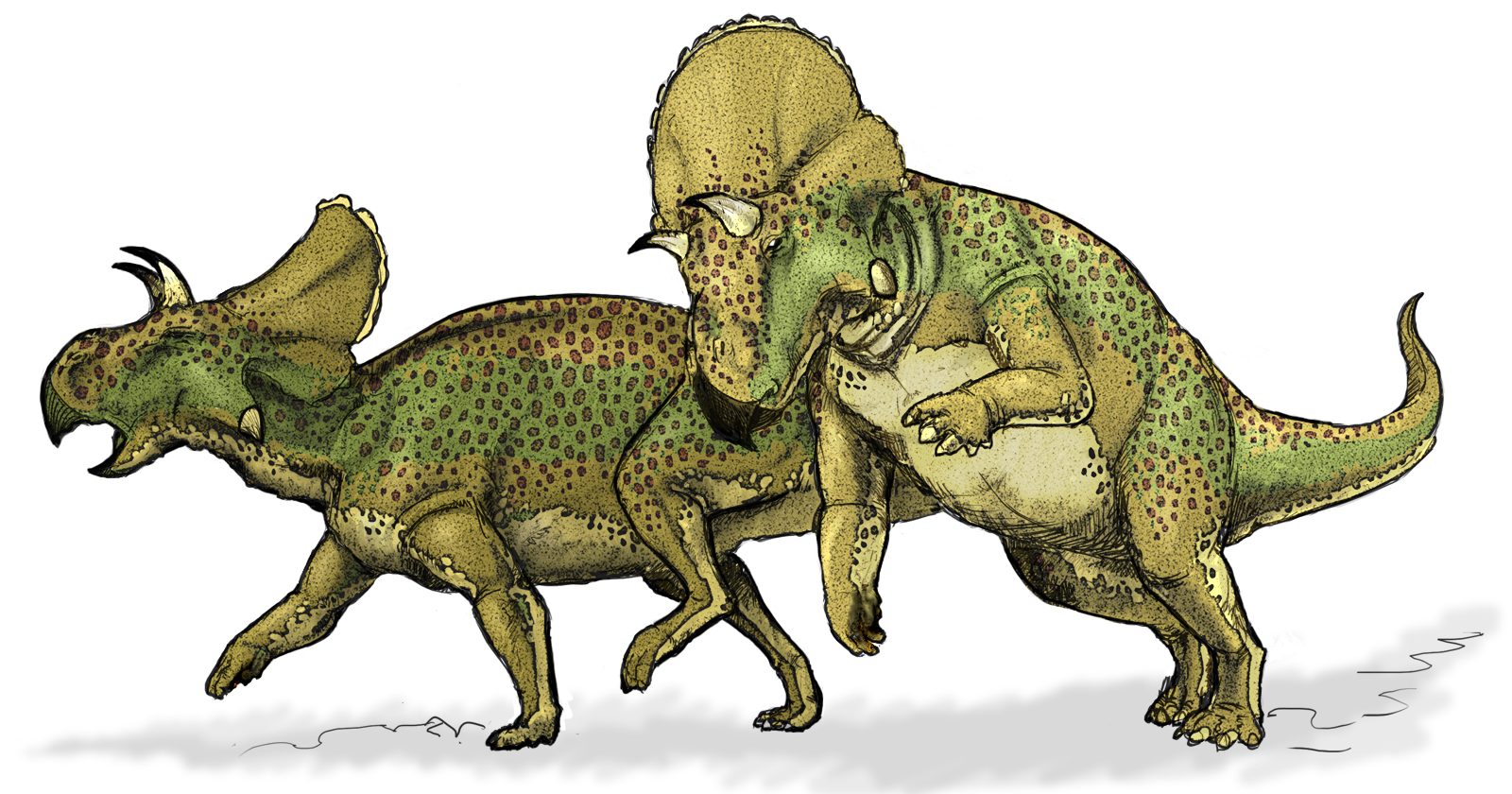
Restoration of two running specimens

Avaceratops, like all ceratopsians, was a herbivore. During the Cretaceous, flowering plants were "geographically limited on the landscape", so it is likely that this dinosaur fed on the predominant plants of the era: ferns, cycads and conifers. It would have used its sharp ceratopsian beak to bite off the leaves or needles. The habitat of Avaceratops was heavily forested and wet.

== See also ==
- Timeline of ceratopsian research
