= Hilda mega-bonebed =

Fossil locality in Alberta, Canada

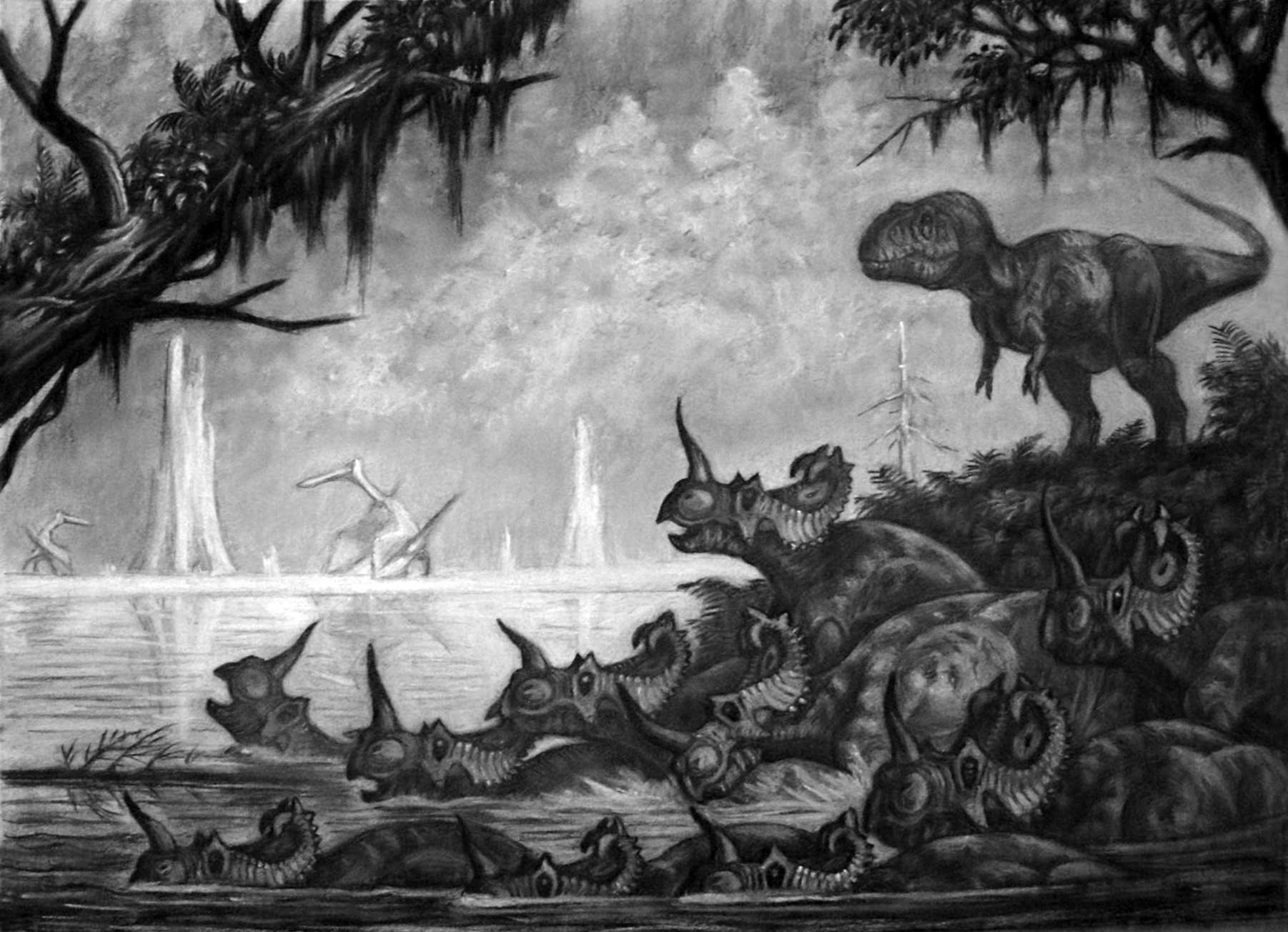
Restoration of a Centrosaurus herd swimming

The Hilda mega-bonebed is a complex of fourteen probable Centrosaurus apertus bonebeds discovered near the town of Hilda in Alberta, Canada. It was first described in the scientific literature by David Eberth, Donald Brinkman, and Vaia Barkas in 2010 after more than ten years of research. The Hilda mega-bonebed is significant because the behavior of the preserved dinosaurs themselves was the dominant cause of its existence, rather than the stratum's geological history like most bonebeds. It is also Canada's largest bonebed.

== History of research ==
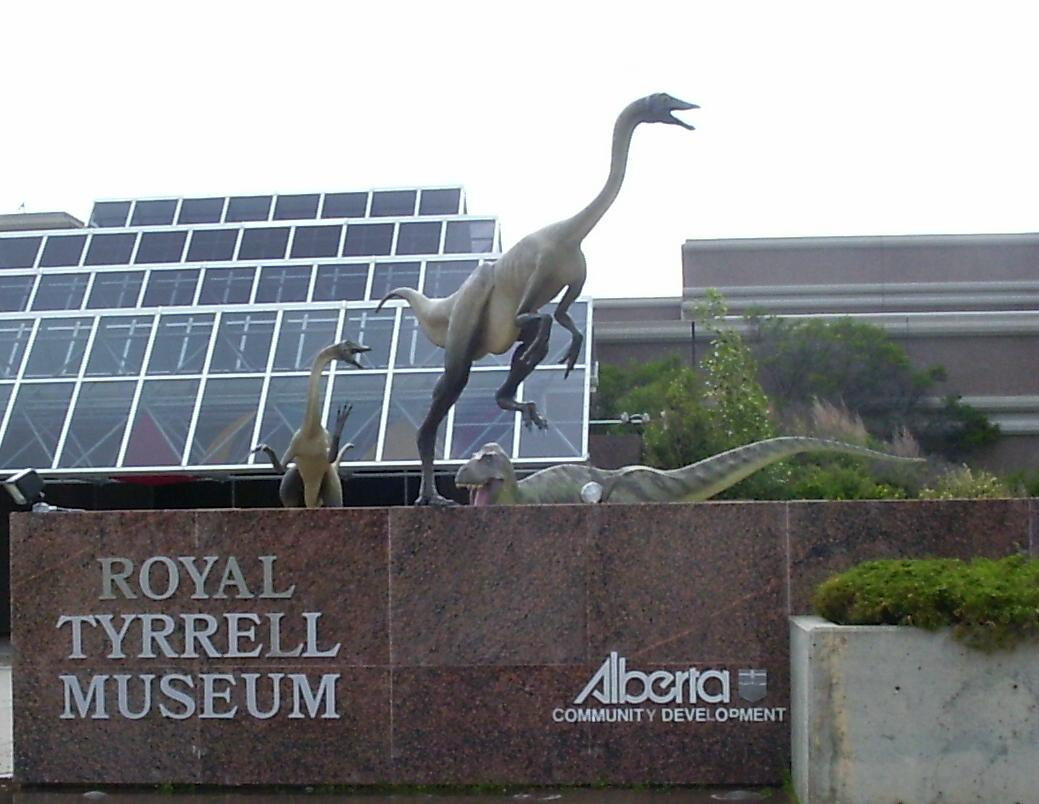
An outdated model of Ornithomimus lacking feathers outside the Royal Tyrrell Museum of Paleontology

In 1959, Wann Langston, Jr. recorded evidence of a Centrosaurus bonebed near Hilda, Alberta. Later, between 1964 and 1966 Don Taylor of the Provincial Museum of Alberta (now called the Royal Alberta Museum) oversaw the collection of fossils from yet another bonebed in the same region. These prospective bonebeds attracted the attention of scientists working for the Royal Tyrell Museum in the 1990s because Hilda was an ideal location for maintaining physical continuity across the bonebeds' expanse. Physical continuity is important, because discontinuity in the rock strata can make it harder to tell if the bones were deposited at the same time or not.

Eberth and the other researchers considered Hilda a prime site for a continuous bonebed for two reasons, one related to its history, one related to its present geography. First, during the Cretaceous the area was situated closer to the Western Interior Seaway where more sediment would have been deposited than at Dinosaur Provincial Park. Secondly, the modern Hilda area lacks the rough badland terrain that breaks up many probably equivalent deposits in Dinosaur Provincial Park.

In 1996, the Royal Tyrell Museum finally performed a preliminary survey of the area studied by Langston and Taylor and entire new bonebeds were discovered. The next year, in 1997, research at Hilda began in earnest. In only two days, researchers discovered 14 separate bonebeds in one mudstone bed that extended for at least 7 km, with 3.7 km worth of visible outcrops. By the conclusion of the research program, the scientists mapped the bonebeds and excavated the bonebed cataloged as H97-04.

They concluded that the Hilda bonebeds formed simultaneously when a herd consisting of thousands of Centrosaurus apertus drowned in a flood. The researchers further speculated that some of the 17 Centrosaurus bonebeds of Dinosaur Provincial Park likely formed simultaneously in a manner analogous to the formation of the Hilda bonebeds, which the researchers estimated to be spread over 2.3 km^{2}. The researchers only collected fossils and taphonomic data from the bonebed H97-04, although all the others were also examined to check the quality and number of preserved bones. The research at Hilda was so complex that over ten years passed from the start of the project until David A. Eberth, Donald B. Brinkman, and Vaia Barkas published a formal description in the scientific literature.

== Geographic location and extent ==
Location of Hilda, Alberta

The mega-bonebed is located 25 kilometers west of the town of Hilda, Alberta in a "steep-walled" valley cut into the landscape by glaciers during the Pleistocene epoch. Northward through this valley's interior runs the South Saskatchewan River. The individual bonebeds in the complex are recognizable as dense concentrations of ceratopsid bones. Research on the bonebeds of Dinosaur Provincial Park has discovered that ceratopsian bonebeds preserved in mudstone deposits tended to be circular to ovular in shape when viewed from above, so the similar Hilda bonebeds probably were as well.

H97-04 is the largest of the fourteen bonebeds, at 150 m in width. If one assumes that H97-04's 150 m width is its longest linear dimension then it had an area of about 17,671 m^{2}. Bonebeds other than H97-04 were less than 50 m wide. These individual component bonebeds tend to have areas of only a few hundred to a few thousand square feet and would have maximum areas of somewhat less than 2,000 square meters. The individual bonebeds at Hilda were generally smaller than those at Dinosaur Provincial Park.

The researchers estimated the entire Hilda complex to be 2.3 square kilometers in area based on the length of its north-south and east-west axes. This is the size of about 280 football fields, and is one of the largest dinosaur bonebeds ever discovered. Bonebeds left by such large animals over wide areas are a rare discovery. However, completely excavating the bonebed would be too huge and complex an undertaking to be practical.

== Lithology and stratigraphy ==
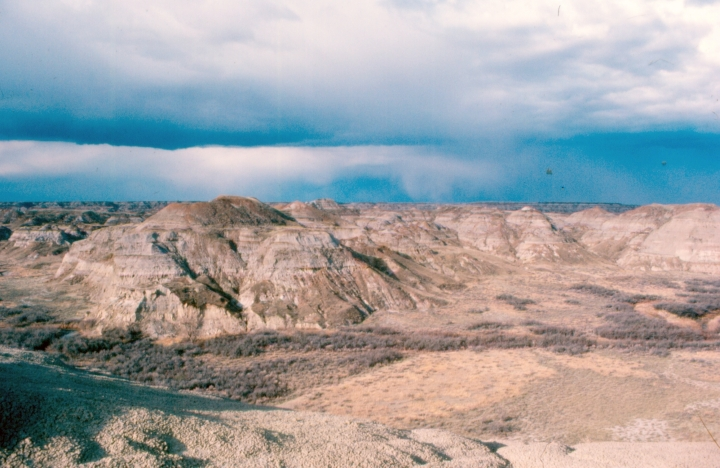
Dinosaur Park Formation strata.

The Hilda mega-bonebed lies within the bottom 25 m of the Dinosaur Park Formation. Eberth, Brinkman and Barkas estimated that in the Hilda area, the Dinosaur Park Formation was almost 60 m thick between the over- and under-lying formations, but glacial activity and slumping had removed all but 43 m of this at the field site. When the researchers examined the stratigraphy of the Hilda site they found that the fourteen bonebeds occupied identical positions in the stratigraphic column. This continuity in the mudstone was what allowed them to infer that each bonebed was actually a component of a single large "mega-bonebed".

At its thinnest point the mudstone bed hosting the centrosaur fossils is 25 cm thick and it measures 1 m at its thickest. Eberth, Brinkman and Barkas observed siltstone, claystone, and abundant organic matter in the composition of the "brown-grey" mudstone. Ironstone concretions can be found scattered throughout the bed, but were most abundant where fossils were also common. Fossils are most common in the lowest parts of the bed. There are signs of deformation in the sediment composing the mudstone.

The stratum hosting the mega-bonebed has different sorts of contacts with other strata at different locations across its extent. The most distinct boundaries separate the Hilda bonebed mudstone from other mudstones above and below it. Less clear boundaries occur where the bonebed mudstone contacts the filled-in remains of an ancient body of flowing water. These contacts record where the channel cut down into the sediment now lithified as the fossil-bearing mudstone. The researchers couldn't find the bed's northern boundary, which they felt might extend north of the northernmost bonebed as part of a succession of stacked mudstone beds. An ancient channel cut all the way through the sediments now composing the mudstone, and its deposit forms the Hilda bonebed's southern boundary.

=== Related strata ===
Eberth, Brinkman, and Barkas also noted the presence of two beds in the mudstone hosting the Hilda bonebeds that weren't ceratopsian bonebeds, but rather they contained vertebrate microfossils. The first of these was H97-09, a natural part of the same stratum that hosted the ceratopsian bonebeds, but bearing only the remains of aquatic animals like champsosaurs, crocodilians, fish, and turtles.

The second was a lens of sandstone that formed after the ceratopsian bonebeds cataloged as H97-12. This lens of sandstone penetrated down into the bed that hosted the ceratopsian bonebeds, probably deposited by a creek. Like H97-09, H97-12 contained only fragmentary remains of aquatic vertebrates like crocodiles and turtles.

== Fossil content ==
=== Centrosaur remains ===
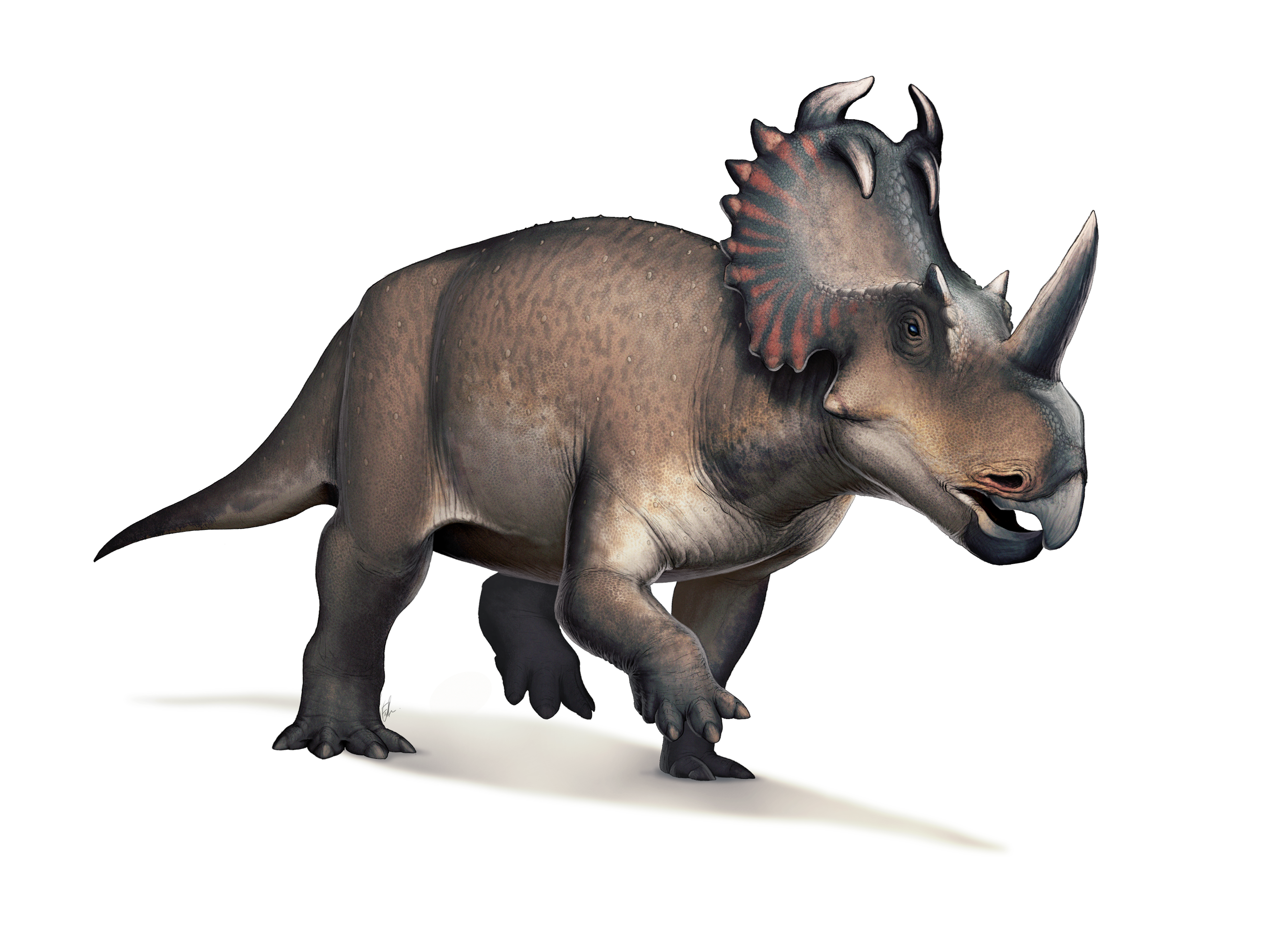
Restoration of Centrosaurus apertus

At the conclusion of their research program, Eberth, Brinkman and Barkas were unable to identify the bonebeds' ceratopsian remains to a rank more specific than the subfamily Centrosaurinae. Nevertheless, every single ceratopsian fossil that could be identified from the bonebeds had features closely resembling those of Centrosaurus apertus. They consequently felt confident that the bonebed was mostly composed of that species.

The researchers found that the larger bones in each bonebeds tended to lie at the base of the stratum with fragments of bone becoming smaller and less concentrated at higher positions in the mudstone bed. Most of the bones were angled parallel to the plane of the bed. The researchers only found associated or articulated fossils at two of Hilda's bone beds; H97-03 had a partial Centrosaurus skull and H97-19 had a partial ceratopsian tail. As such, they regarded such higher quality specimens as very rare.

Eberth, Brinkman, and Barkas tried to estimate the number of bones in the mega-bonebed in order to infer the number of animals that died together during the formation of the deposit. However, the complexity of a bonebed's geologic and taphonomic history can only allow for rough estimates.

H97-04 represented the densest part of the Hilda mega-bonebed and formed the "core" of its fossil deposits. Nevertheless, the amount and quality of preserved bone was highly variable within this bed. The centrosaur fossils of H97-04 were most densely concentrated in its middle 50 m, with the 50 m on each side of this central region of the bonebed being much sparser. The researchers took the average bone density of two excavations within H97-04, 1 individual per 3 square meters, and projected it over the 2,000 square meters of the H97-04 bonebed. They estimated that this core area preserved the remains of 667 centrosaurs.

In H97-02 the researchers found that at least 6 individuals were discovered in a 20 square meter area, but suspected that this relatively high density was not uniform throughout the deposit. They concluded that the number of centrosaurs preserved at H97-02 was probably "in the low hundreds".

The remaining 15,600 square meters of the Hilda mega-bonebed contained only about 10% of the fossil density observed in the "core" of H97-04. Assuming the periphery of H97-04 had this estimated average density, there would have been about 500-600 more centrosaurs overall. Thus, the total estimated number centrosaurs preserved in the Hilda area ranged from several hundred to about 1,500 individuals. However, the presence of centrosaur bonebeds on both sides of the South Saskatchewan River suggests that the river eroded away many fossil deposits that had originally been preserved there. Therefore the original size of the centrosaur herd was probably even larger than the estimate based on still-accessible fossils would suggest and may have included up to several thousand dinosaurs.

=== Other fossils ===
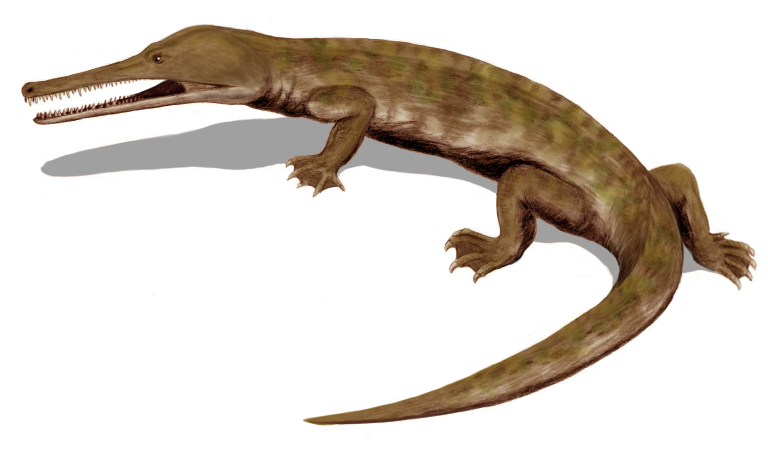
A champsosaur.

The mudstone hosting the Hilda mega-bonebed preserves large quantities of plant fossils throughout the bed as well as coal, wood debris, and root traces. The root traces come at a variety of orientations ranging from horizontal to vertical. Some of these being the roots' original life position. The researchers concluded that the abundance of preserved plant material probably reflects the great abundance of local plant life during the Cretaceous.

H97-04's excavation site Excavation A preserved shed teeth from theropods of differing size, champsosaur vertebrae, a fish scale, a pisidiid clam, and two unidentifiable coprolites in addition to its centrosaur fossils. The Excavation B site at H97-04 preserved a fish scale and two theropod teeth.

== Formation ==
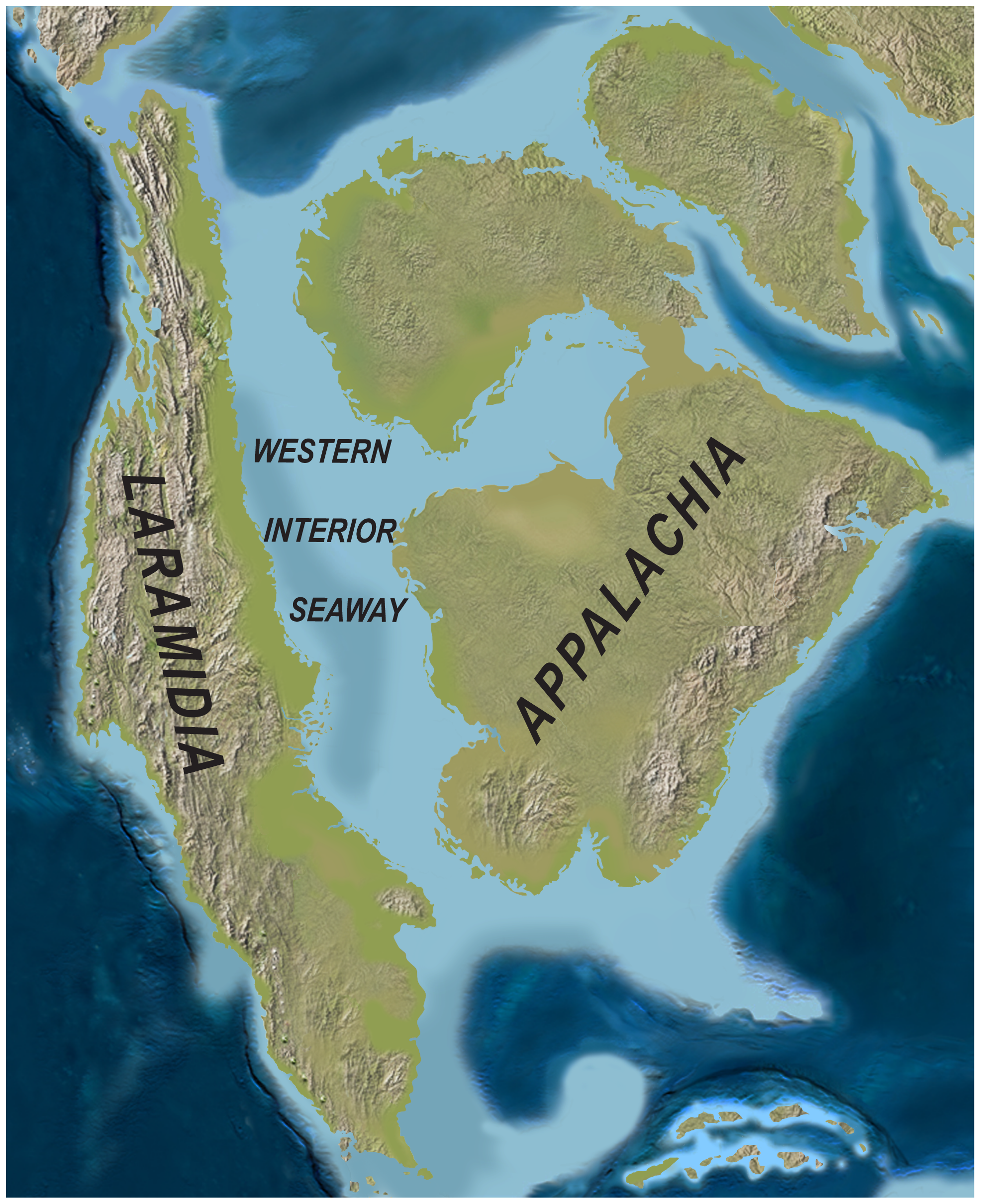
Map of North America and the Western Interior Seaway in the Late Cretaceous (~ 75 million years ago)

Previous research on Albertan centrosaur bonebeds interpreted their formation in terms of a herd of dinosaurs drowning while trying to cross a swollen river. Eberth, Brinkman, and Barkas proposed a different explanation for the Hilda mega-bonebed, hypothesizing that a herd of Centrosaurus apertus, as well as other local wildlife, were killed by a flood. The researchers concluded that all of the component bonebeds of the Hilda complex formed during the same individual flood.

The region around the Western Interior Seaway was prone to tropical storm activity, many of which could become full-scale hurricanes. Similar weather events occur today in the Gulf of Mexico and Bangladesh. These floods would have been large enough to entirely submerge the coastal lowland plains that the dinosaurs were living on, leaving nowhere to hide or escape to. Because Centrosaurus likely had poor swimming abilities most of the herd would have drowned during sufficiently severe flooding events. Centrosaurs not killed by the flooding would have been vulnerable to "flood-related disease" outbreaks in its aftermath. Tropical storm-induced floods were probably common sources of mass mortality for Centrosaurus apertus. According to David Eberth, smaller local wildlife were better equipped to escape the floodwaters than centrosaurs, noting that birds could escape by flight, while mammals and reptiles could have taken shelter in trees or burrows.

After they died the dinosaurs's carcasses were deposited in clumps spread over kilometers. Variation in the location and concentration of centrosaur bones was caused by factors like force and dimensions of the flood, smoothness or roughness of local terrain, and the centrosaurs' distribution in life. These variations likely coincided with the presence of small "sub-environments" commonly found between rivers like splays, ponds or creeks.

After being deposited in their final resting places the carcasses were torn apart, had their bones trampled and chewed by scavengers. These processes left the abrasion and toothmarks seen on the bones preserved at H97-02. Chemical reactions between the decaying dinosaur flesh and floodwaters caused iron to precipitate out of the water and formed the ironstone concretions commonly found in the mudrock hosting the mega-bonebed.

Their eventful taphonomies suggests that the centrosaur carcasses were permanently buried by a later flood rather than the one that drowned them. These floods may actually have been common enough to be the primary means by which sediment was deposited in the Hilda area during the Cretaceous. Eberth Brinkman and Barkas observed evidence that the sediment was deformed and contorted near the top and bottom before it hardened into the mudstone it is today.

== Comparison with other bonebeds ==
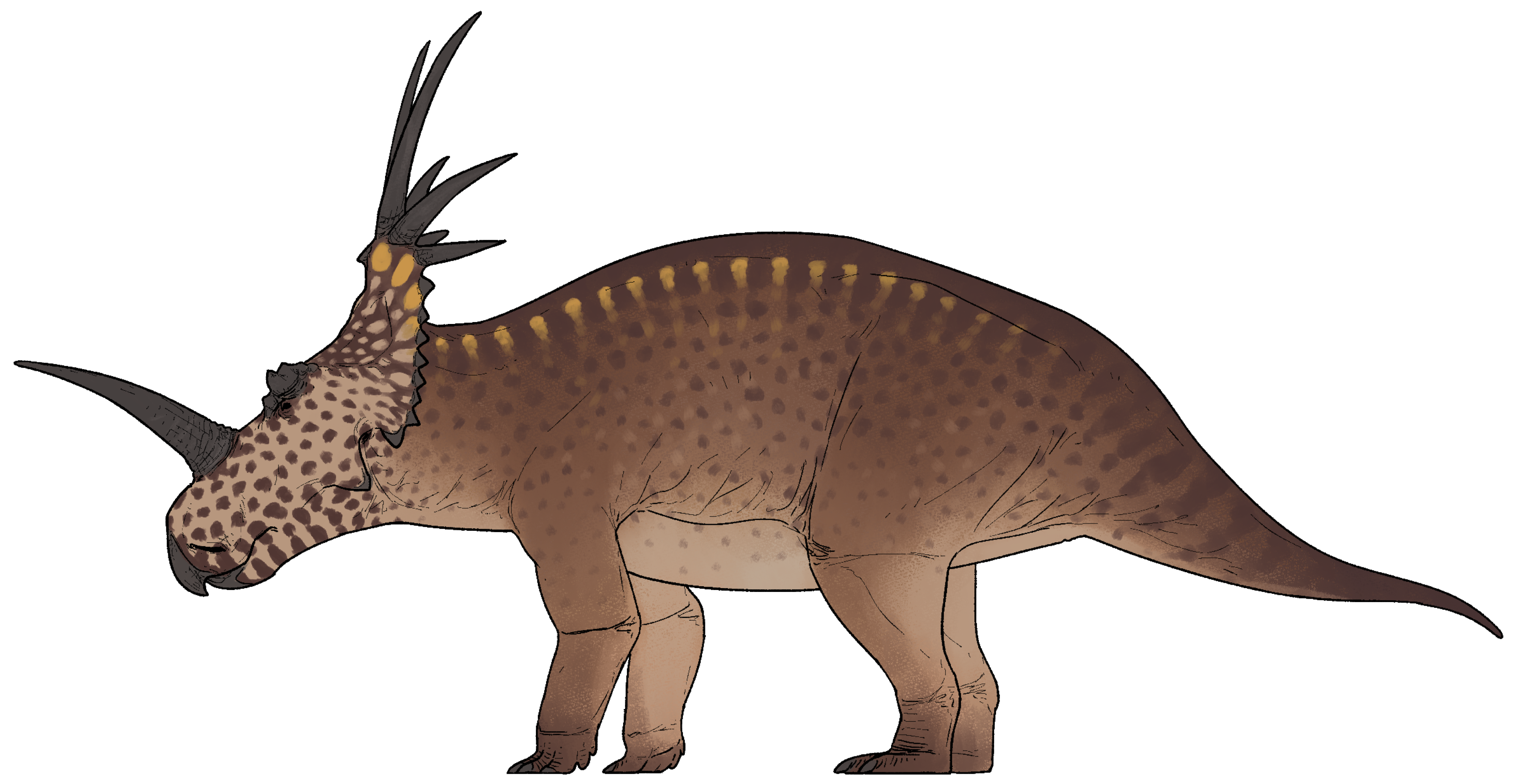
Restoration of Styracosaurus albertensis, which is also known from Late Cretaceous bonebeds in Alberta.

The Hilda Mega-bonebed is about 76 million years old, the same age as the lower Dinosaur Park Formation outcrops of the Dinosaur Provincial Park strata. Monodominant bonebeds of horned dinosaurs like Styracosaurus, Pachyrhinosaurus and Centrosaurus are common in late Cretaceous strata of central and southern Alberta. The close proximity of such a large number of bonebeds has fueled suspicions in some experts that some of the different bonebeds may have actually formed simultaneously in the same events.

According to Eberth, Brinkman, and Barkas, the idea that several of these bonebeds could have formed together is "difficult to test", however. This difficulty emerges from the complicated nature of local stratigraphy as individual bonebeds are difficult to track for more than a few hundred meters because they are divided by ancient channel deposits. The only certainty regarding the number of events involved in the formation of the bone beds is that more than one occurred since at least one bonebed is known to be preserved in a rock stratum directly over another bonebed. The Hilda bonebeds distinguish themselves by being preserved in a single easily traceable stratum.

In two 2005 scientific papers, Eberth, Getty, and Currie formulated a hypothesis for the formation of the centrosaur bonebeds of Dinosaur Provincial Park. They envisioned common flooding events drowning large numbers of local wildlife, including herds of Centrosaurus and Styracosaurus. Flowing water would distribute these remains across the local floodplain, where they would be buried by later floods.

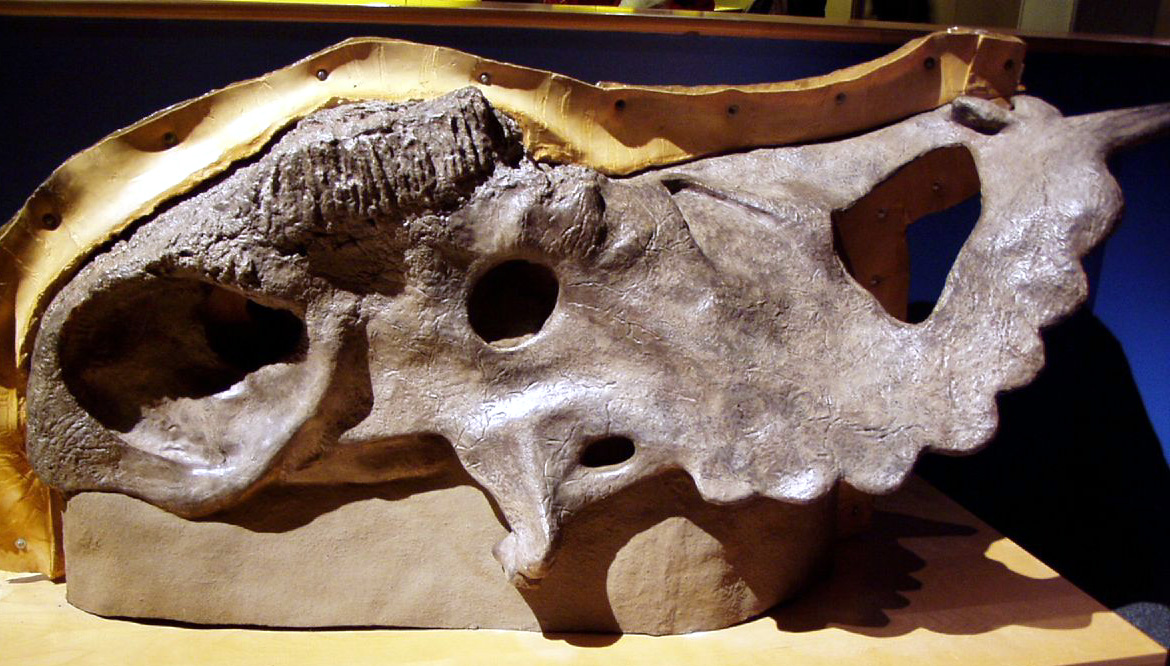
Skull of Pachyrhinosaurus canadensis, another ceratopsid known from Late Cretaceous bonebeds in Alberta.

Burial was not always permanent as some remains seem to have been uncovered again by later flood activity only to be buried again by yet more later floods. The process of reworking and reburial might have occurred over decades or millennia before the remains were buried for good in their final resting place, which was often in deposits left by channels of flowing water. Eberth, Brinkman, and Barkas thought that the above scenario "appl[ied] particularly well" so the Hilda bonebeds formed as a result of similar processes to those of Dinosaur Provincial Park.

The bonebeds at Hilda and in Dinosaur Provincial Park also preserve similar quantities and types of plant fossils. The two areas differed, however, in that all of the component bonebeds of the Hilda mega-bonebed, apart from H97-04, were smaller and preserved lower numbers of dinosaurs than those of the park. The centrosaur bonebeds of Dinosaur Provincial Park were often more than 10,000 square meters in area. These bonebeds tended to preserve centrosaurs in the "hundreds to low thousands" apiece.

== Implications ==
Although not the first Centrosaurus bonebed, the study of the fossils preserved in the Hilda mega-bonebed provides additional data that will help scientists estimate the size of ceratopsid herds and therefore better understand ceratopsid social behavior. Hilda increases the evidence for herding in Centrosaurus and that centrosaur herds were sometimes significantly larger than previously thought, possibly containing numbers in the high hundreds to low thousands. The abundant mudstone beds in the Hilda area may imply that floods like the one drowned the centrosaurs at Hilda were common. The researchers contended that the existence of a single mega-bonebed with 14 individual components at Hilda may imply that some of the bonebeds of Dinosaur Provincial Park may themselves be components of larger mega-bonebeds.

The Hilda mega-bonebed may also support the previously suggested notion that some kinds of centrosaurines participated in seasonal migrations, travelling from east to west. Brinkman and others proposed this hypothesis in 1998 to explain why ceratopsians represented a greater portion of ornithischian biodiversity at sites like Unity, Saskatchewan or Onefour, Alberta near the ancient coast, while the famous centrosaur bonebeds of Dinosaur Provincial Park were all preserved in more inland habitats.

The migration hypothesis proposed by Brinkman and the others was that centrosaurs bred near the coast and reared their young in small family groups. These groups would then migrate toward the west in order to avoid seasonal hazards like storms or to exploit seasonally available resources in that direction. As the migration progressed the family groups would gradually merge, becoming large herds, which may have protected them from predators on the journey. Eberth, Brinkman, and Barkas noted that Hilda is located roughly halfway between the ancient coast and the Dinosaur Provincial Park bonebeds.

== See also ==
- Centrosaurinae
- Taphonomy
