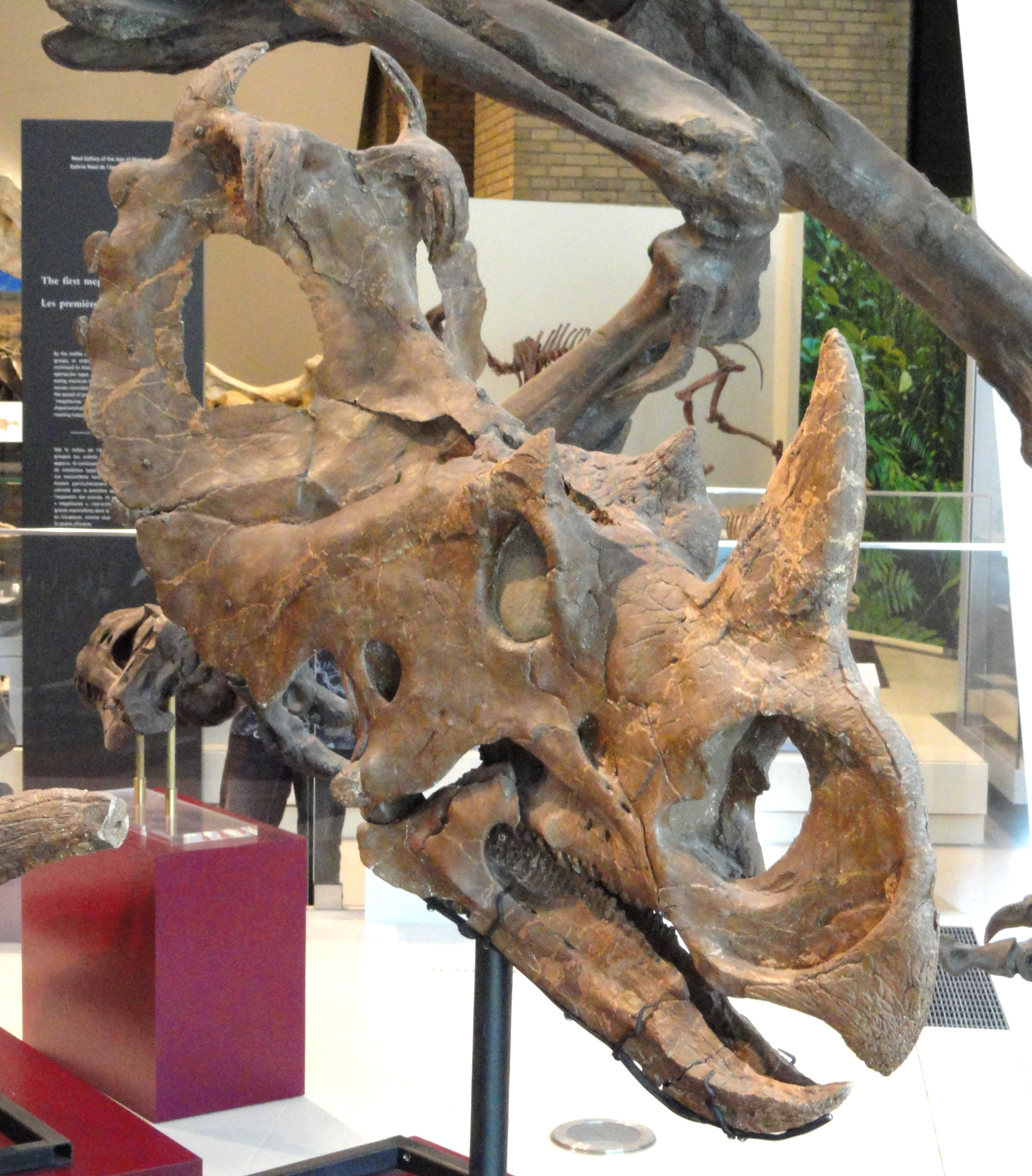
- Skull ROM 767 from Dinosaur Provincial Park

Scientific classification
- Kingdom: Animalia
- Phylum: Chordata
- Class: Reptilia
- Clade: Dinosauria
- Clade: †Ornithischia
- Clade: †Ceratopsia
- Family: †Ceratopsidae
- Subfamily: †Centrosaurinae
- Clade: †Eucentrosaura
- Tribe: †Centrosaurini
- Genus: †Centrosaurus; Lambe, 1904
- Species: †C. apertus

Binomial name
- †Centrosaurus apertus Lambe 1904

Synonyms
- Monoclonius nasicornus Brown, 1917; Monoclonius dawsoni Lambe, 1902; Monoclonius longirostris (Sternberg, 1940) Kuhn, 1964; Monoclonius cutleri Brown, 1917; Centrosaurus flexus (Brown, 1914) Lambe, 1915; Eucentrosaurus apertus (Lambe, 1904) Chure & McIntosh, 1989

= Centrosaurus =

Centrosaurus Temporal range: Late Cretaceous (Campanian), 76.5–75.5 Ma

Extinct genus of dinosaurs

Centrosaurus (/ˌsɛntroʊˈsɔːrəs/ SEN-troh-SOR-əs; lit. 'pointed lizard') is a genus of centrosaurine ceratopsid dinosaur from the Campanian age of the Late Cretaceous of Canada. Its remains have been found in the Dinosaur Park Formation, dating from 76.5 to 75.5 million years ago. The type and only species seen as valid today is Centrosaurus apertus.

== Discovery and naming ==
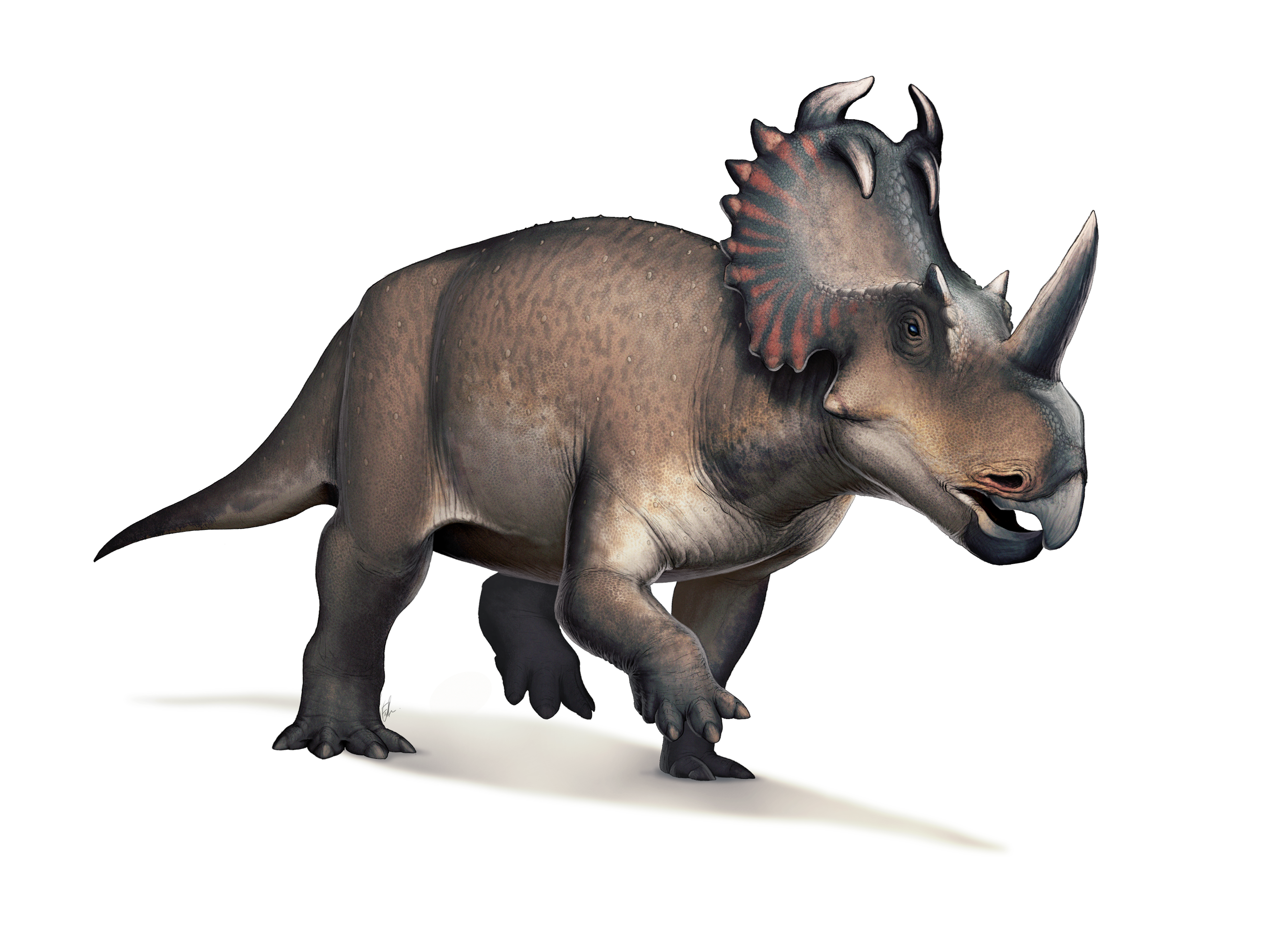
Life restoration

The first Centrosaurus remains were discovered and named by paleontologist Lawrence Lambe in strata along the Red Deer River in Alberta. The name Centrosaurus means "pointed lizard" (from Greek kentron, κέντρον, "point" and sauros, σαῦρος, "lizard") and refers to, the series of small hornlets placed along the margin of their frills, not the nasal horns (which were unknown when the dinosaur was named). The genus is not to be confused with the stegosaur Kentrosaurus, the name of which is derived from the same Greek word.

Later, vast bonebeds of Centrosaurus were found in Dinosaur Provincial Park, also in Alberta. Some of these beds extend for hundreds of meters and contain thousands of individuals of all ages and all levels of completion. Scientists have speculated that the high density and number of individuals would be explained if they had perished while trying to cross a flooded river. A discovery of thousands of Centrosaurus fossils near the town of Hilda, Alberta, is believed to be the largest bed of dinosaur bones ever discovered. The area is now known as the Hilda mega-bonebed.

Because of the variation between species and even individual specimens of centrosaurines, there has been much debate over which genera and species are valid, particularly whether Centrosaurus and/or Monoclonius are valid genera, undiagnosable, or possibly members of the opposite sex. In 1996, Peter Dodson found enough variation between Centrosaurus, Styracosaurus, and Monoclonius to warrant separate genera and that Styracosaurus resembled Centrosaurus more closely than either resembled Monoclonius.

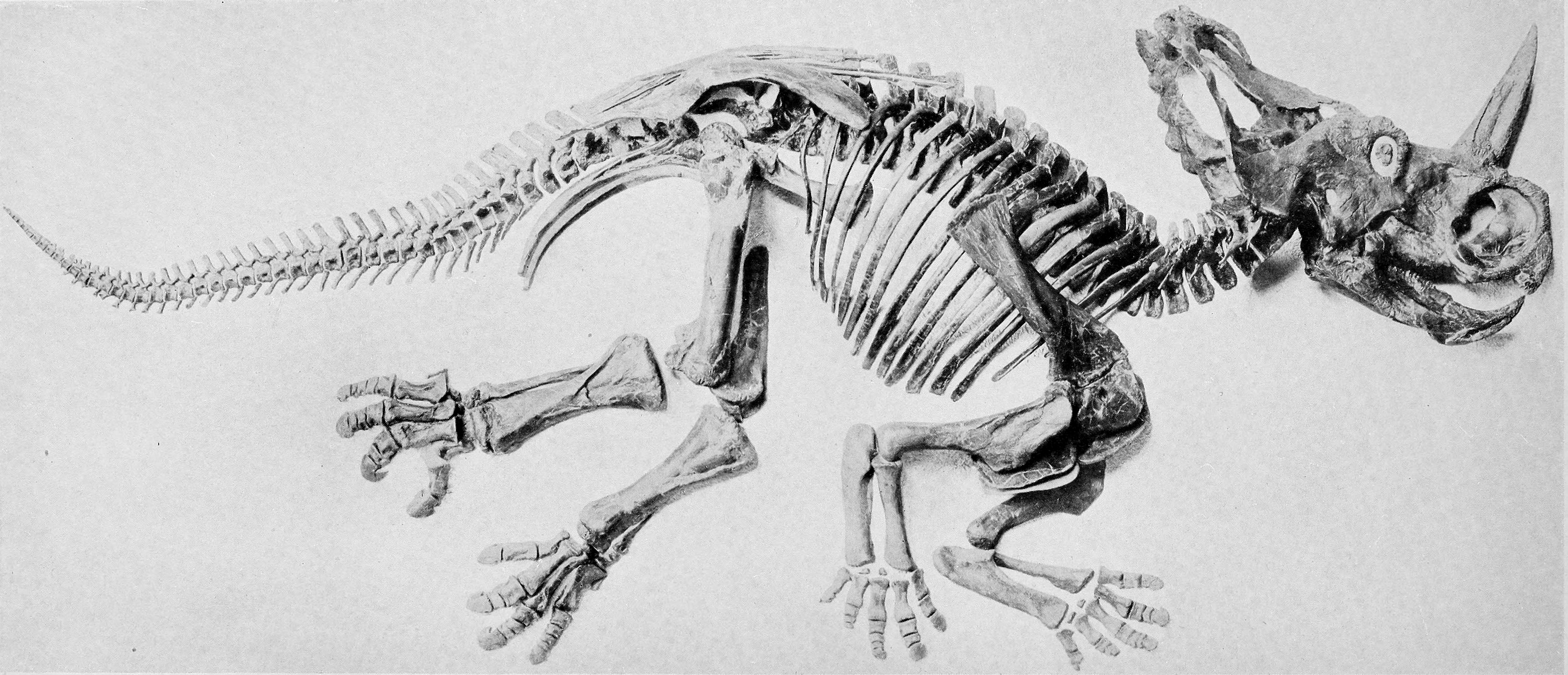
The "Monoclonius nasicornus" skeleton

Dodson believed one species of Monoclonius, M. nasicornus, may actually have been a female Styracosaurus. His assessments have been partially followed, with other researchers not accepting Monoclonius nasicornus as a female Styracosaurus or Monoclonius as a valid genus. While sexual dimorphism has been proposed for a more basal ceratopsian, Protoceratops, there is no firm evidence for sexual dimorphism in any ceratopsid. Others have synonymized C. nasicornus with C. apertus, or considered it a separate Centrosaurus species: Centrosaurus nasicornus. It has also been suggested as the direct ancestor of Styracosaurus albertensis. A 2014 study of changes during growth in Centrosaurus concluded that C. nasicornus is a junior synonym of C. apertus, representing a middle growth stage.

The species C. brinkmani, described in 2005, was moved to the new genus Coronosaurus in 2012.

== Description ==
Size comparison with human

Centrosaurus were large dinosaurs, although not as large as some of their relatives, reaching 5–5.5 metres (16–18 ft) long and 2–2.5 metric tons (2.2–2.8 short tons) in body mass situated atop stocky limbs. Like other centrosaurines, Centrosaurus bore a single large horn over their noses. These horns curved forwards or backwards depending on the specimen. Skull ornamentation was reduced as animals aged. The frill was relatively short compared to the total skull length and could grow to over half a meter (68.8 cm) long in the oldest and largest adults.

Centrosaurus is distinguished by having two large hornlets which hook forwards over the frill. A pair of small upwards directed horns is also found over the eyes. The frills of Centrosaurus were moderately long, with fairly large fenestrae and small hornlets along the outer edges.

== Classification ==
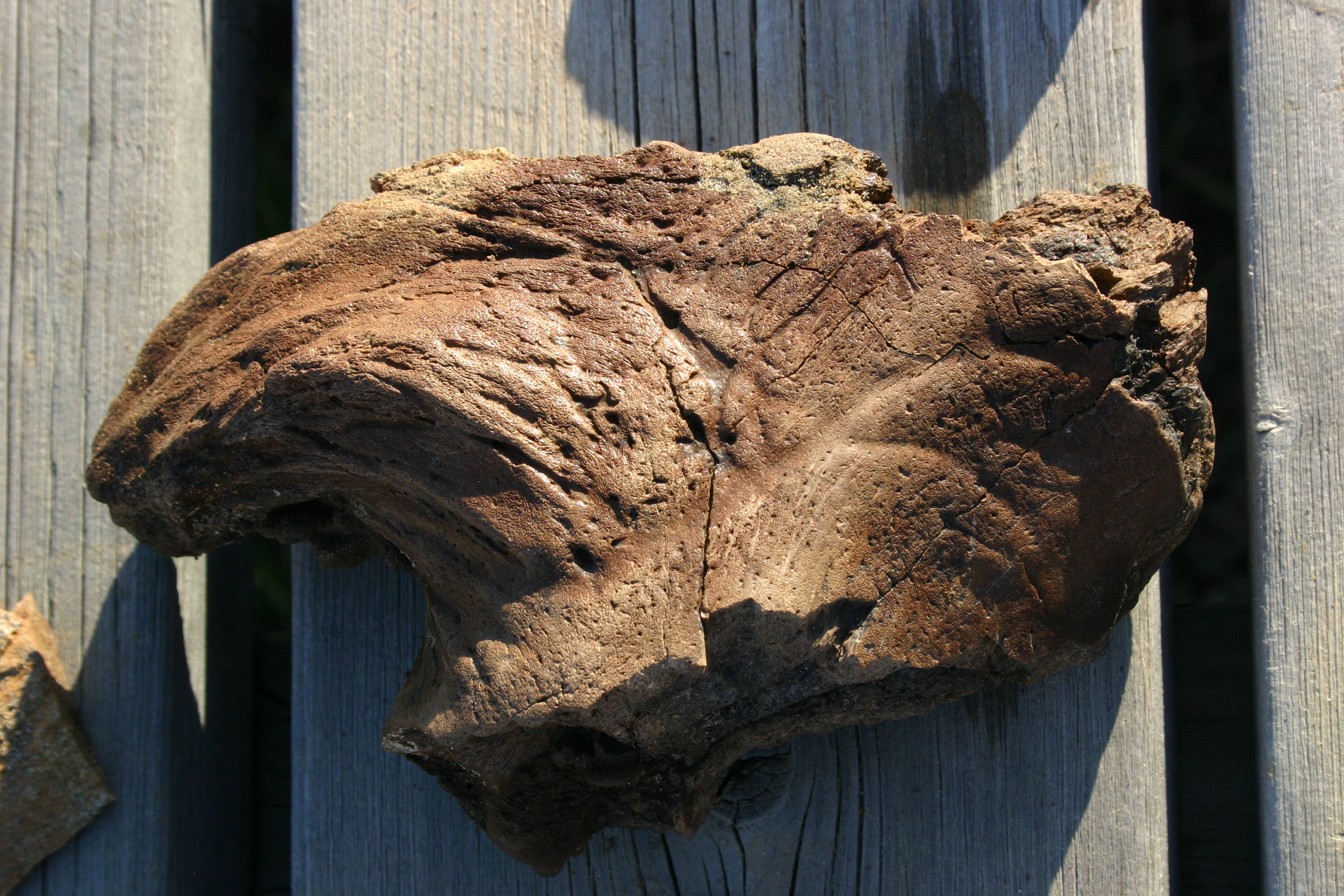
A large parietal hook of a Centrosaurus' frill, which is a diagnostic trait of this genus

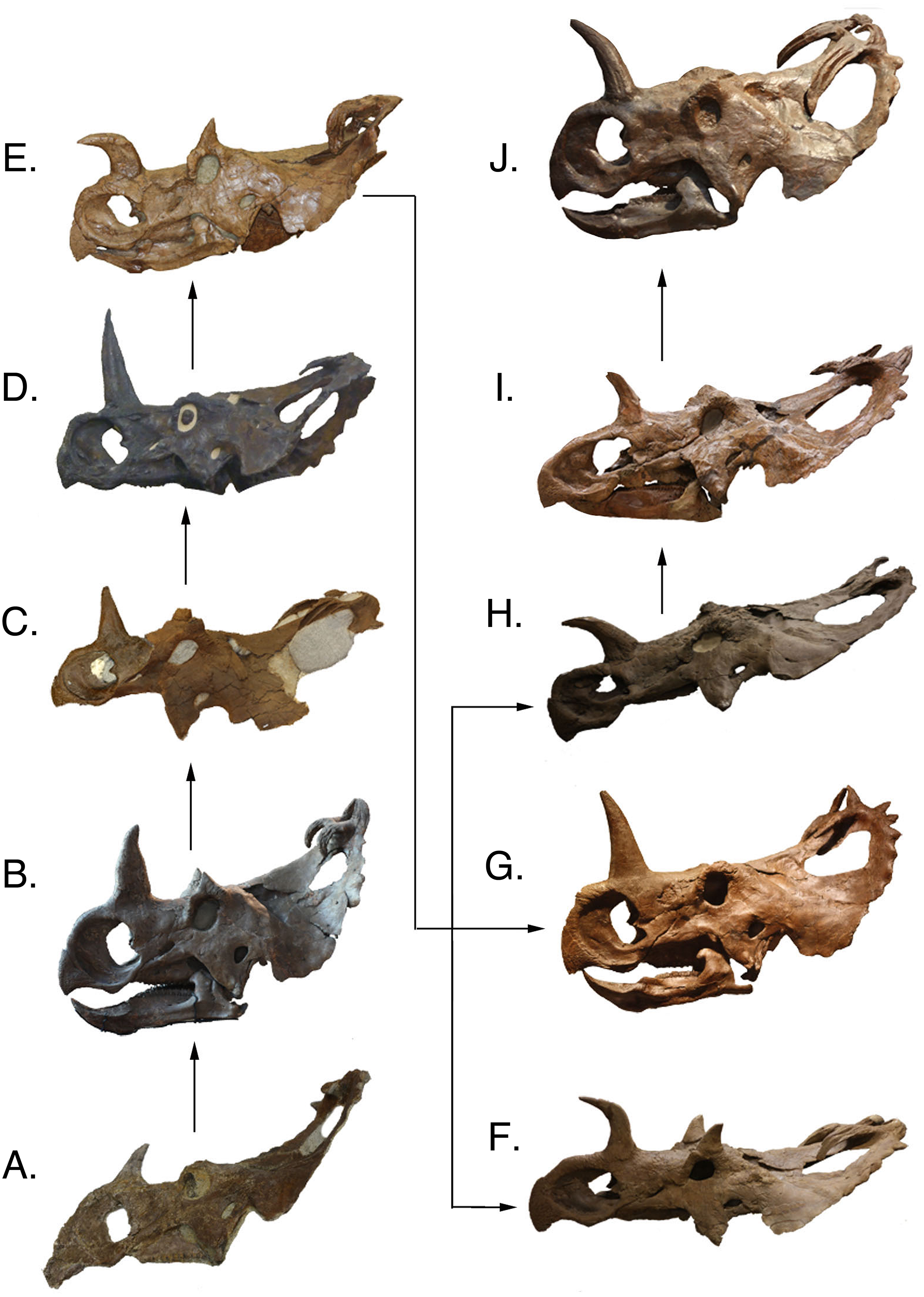
Complete skulls arranged in ontogenetic order

The genus Centrosaurus gives its name to the Centrosaurinae subfamily. Its closest relatives appear to be Styracosaurus and Monoclonius. It so closely resembles the latter of these that some paleontologists have considered them to represent the same animal. Other members of the Centrosaurinae subfamily include Pachyrhinosaurus, Avaceratops, Einiosaurus, Albertaceratops, and Achelousaurus.

The cladogram presented below represents a phylogenetic analysis by Chiba et al. (2017):

- Centrosaurinae
  - - Diabloceratops eatoni
    - Machairoceratops cronusi
  - - Nasutoceratopsini
      - Avaceratops lammersi (ANSP 15800)
      - MOR 692
      - CMN 8804
      - Nasutoceratops titusi
      - Malta new taxon
    - - Xenoceratops foremostensis
      - - - Sinoceratops zhuchengensis
          - Wendiceratops pinhornensis
        - Albertaceratops nesmoi
        - Medusaceratops lokii
        - Eucentrosaura
          - Centrosaurini
            - - Rubeosaurus ovatus
              - Styracosaurus albertensis
            - - Coronosaurus brinkmani
              - - Centrosaurus apertus
                - Spinops sternbergorum
          - Pachyrhinosaurini
            - Einiosaurus procurvicornis
            - Pachyrostra
              - Achelousaurus horneri
              - - Pachyrhinosaurus canadensis
                - - Pachyrhinosaurus lakustai
                  - Pachyrhinosaurus perotorum

== Paleobiology ==
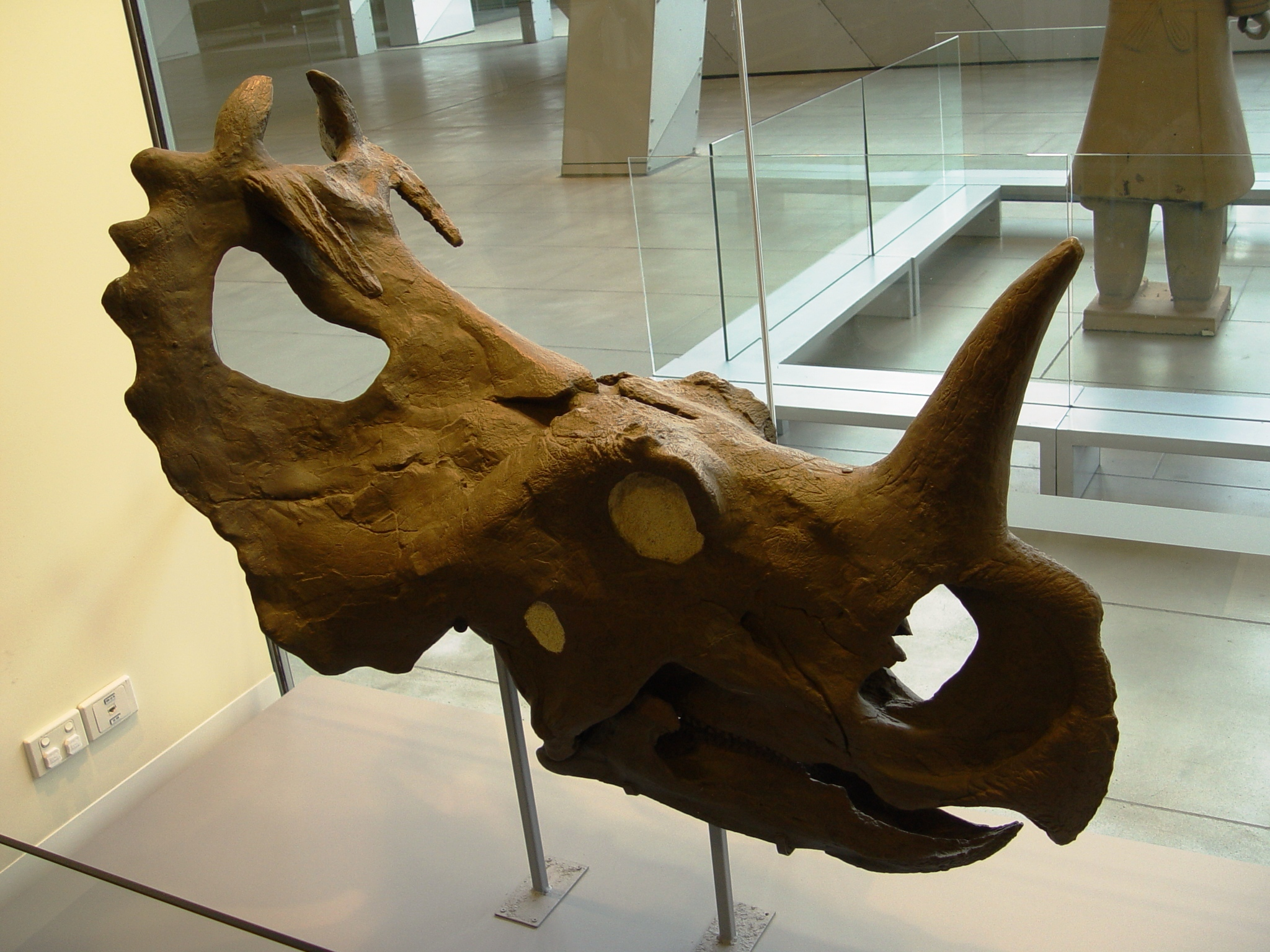
Cast of AMNH 5427, Museum of Victoria

Like other ceratopsids, the jaws of Centrosaurus were adapted to shear through tough plant material. The discovery of gigantic bone beds of Centrosaurus in Canada suggest that they were gregarious animals and could have traveled in large herds. A bone bed composed of Centrosaurus and Styracosaurus remains is known from the Dinosaur Park Formation in what is now Alberta. The mass deaths may have been caused by otherwise non-herding animals gathering around a waterhole during a drought. Centrosaurus is found lower in the formation than Styracosaurus, indicating that Centrosaurus was displaced by Styracosaurus as the environment changed over time.

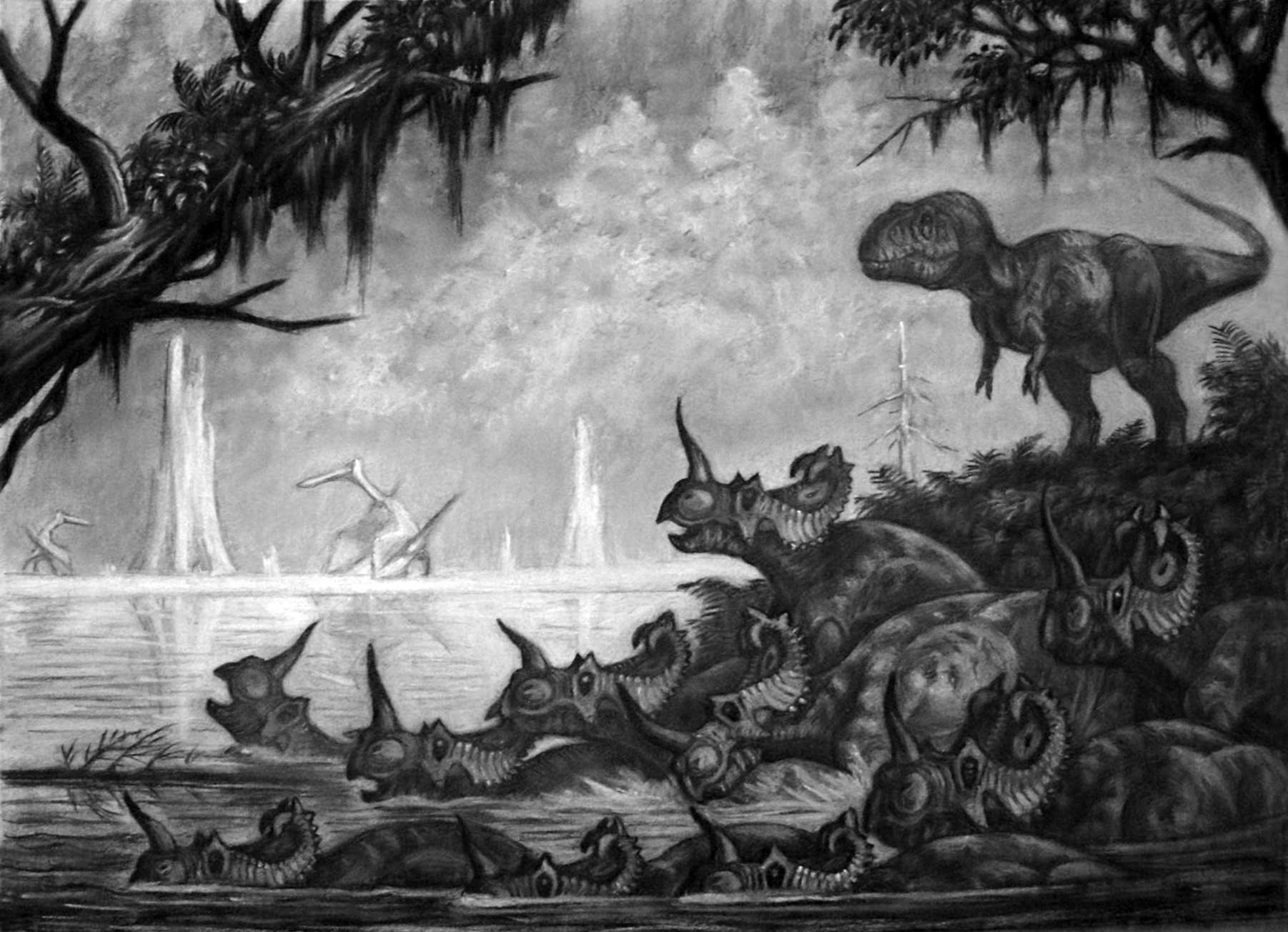
Restoration of a herd swimming, as hypothesised by mega-bonebeds

The large frills and nasal horns of the ceratopsians are among the most distinctive facial adornments of all dinosaurs. Their function has been the subject of debate since the first horned dinosaurs were discovered. Common theories concerning the function of ceratopsian frills and horns include defense from predators, combat within the species, and visual display. A 2009 study of Triceratops and Centrosaurus skull lesions found that bone injuries on the skulls were more likely caused by intraspecific combat (horn-to-horn combat) rather than predatory attacks. The frills of Centrosaurus were too thin to be used for defense against predators, although the thicker, solid frills of Triceratops might have evolved to protect their necks. The frills of Centrosaurus were most likely used "for species recognition and/or other forms of visual display".

=== Paleopathology ===
A specimen of Centrosaurus apertus recovered from Dinosaur Provincial Park in 1989 was discovered to have crippling osteosarcoma in its right fibula. Examination of the cancerous lesions in the bone suggest the cancer had reached an aggressive stage. The cancer would have resulted in a severe limp that would have made the ceratopsian more vulnerable to predation. However, the fact that it was part of a herd allowed the Centrosaurus to survive much longer than would be expected for an animal infected with such severe disease. The individual itself is believed to have died from drowning in the flash flood that created the Centrosaurus bone bed where it was found. The specimen remains one of the few dinosaur specimens found with severe cancer.

== Paleobiogeography ==
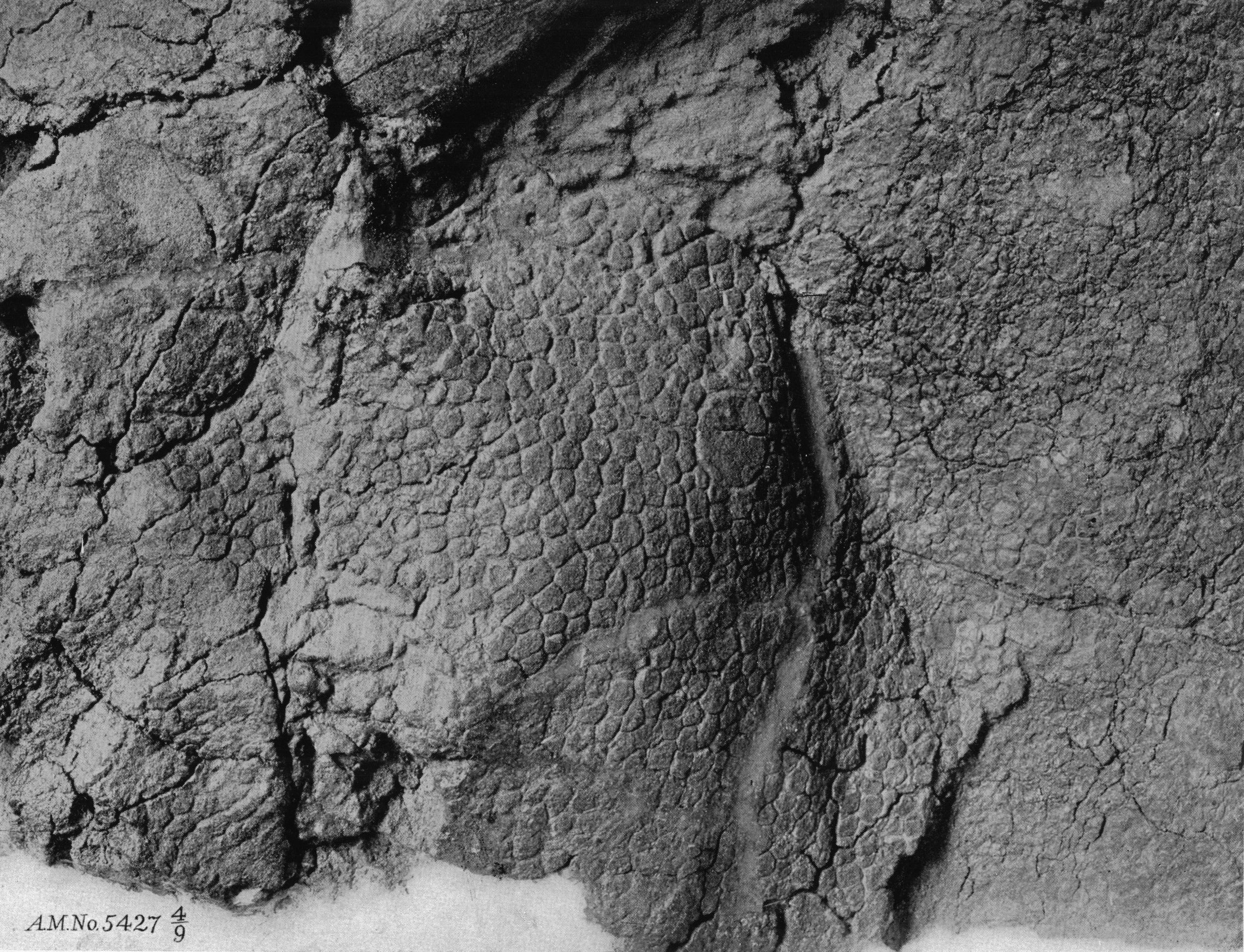
Skin impression of AMNH 5427

Thomas M. Lehman has observed that Centrosaurus fossils haven't been found outside of southern Alberta even though they are among the most abundant Judithian dinosaurs in the region. Large herbivores like the ceratopsians living in North America during the Late Cretaceous had "remarkably small geographic ranges" despite their large body size and high mobility. This restricted distribution strongly contrasts with modern mammalian faunas whose large herbivores' ranges "typical[ly] ... span much of a continent." Fossil material of C. apertus was subsequently described from the strata of the Dinosaur Park Formation in Saskatchewan.

== See also ==
- Timeline of ceratopsian research
