= Hilda, Alberta =

Hamlet in Alberta, Cypress County, Canada

Hilda
- Hamlet
- Location of Hilda Hilda (Canada)
- Coordinates: 50°28′47″N 110°01′58″W
- Country: Canada
- Province: Alberta
- Region: Southern Alberta
- Census division: 1
- Municipal district: Cypress County

Government
  - Type: Unincorporated
  - Governing body: Cypress County Council

Area (2021)
  - Land: 0.42 km^{2} (0.16 sq mi)

Population (2021)
  - Total: 40
  - Density: 94.2/km^{2} (244/sq mi)
- Time zone: UTC−06:00 (Alberta Time)
- Area codes: 403, 587, 825

Hilda is a hamlet in southern Alberta, Canada within Cypress County, located 4 kilometres (2.5 mi) east of Highway 41, approximately 67 kilometres (42 mi) northeast of Medicine Hat.

== Toponymy ==
Hilda was named after Hilda Dorothea Koch, the infant daughter of the hamlet's first postmaster.

== History ==
=== Prehistory ===
Beginning in the 1950s, successive palaeontologists and researchers discovered a complex of probable Mesozoic Era bonebeds near Hilda. The Hilda mega-bonebed is Canada's largest bonebed, and is believed to contain thousands of individual specimens of Centrosaurus apertus.

=== Settlement and development: 1910–1929 ===
In 1910, settler Samuel Koch applied to the Post Office Department to open a post office for the area under the name Hilda, inspired by his daughter. The Bethlehem Lutheran Church also began operations in the area.

In 1911, Koch opened a general store as well, and the area's Baptist community built a church near the Hilda townsite. Originally named Hilda Baptist Church upon its opening in April, it soon changed names to Germantown Baptist Church. The church also established a cemetery. By 1918, the church served around 150 members, and a new church was built to accommodate the growing congregation. Austin's General Store opened in 1915.

Hilda had 1,400 residents by 1921. After its post office burned down that year, postal services would return to Hilda in January 1924, after construction of a new building was completed.

Also in 1924, the Canadian Pacific Railway completed the construction of a siding in the area, also named Hilda. St. James Catholic Church was established in the same year.

The introduction of the railroad brought with it rapid growth for Hilda. At its peak in the 1920s, the hamlet contained six grain elevators and twenty-two businesses. Hilda School also opened in this decade. In 1928, the Baptist church and its parsonage relocated closer to the hamlet, reverting to the name Hilda Baptist Church.

=== Decline: 1930–1978 ===
Economic pressures wrought by the Great Depression and Dust Bowl began to drive farmers away from Hilda in search of better conditions, and the townsite experienced rapid depopulation. Farmers struggled to profit from their farms and homesteads throughout the 1930s, which was characterized locally by years of drought.

The Hilda and Community Association was established in 1946 after locals decided to vest control of the hamlet's community centre and social events in one organization. The majority of businesses operating in Hilda had failed, or begun to fail, by the 1950s. By 1956, four grain elevators were standing in Hilda.

In the 1970s, the Rose Glen Hutterite Colony was founded near Hilda, and a new Baptist church was constructed. The old building was sold.

=== Hamlet: 1979–present ===
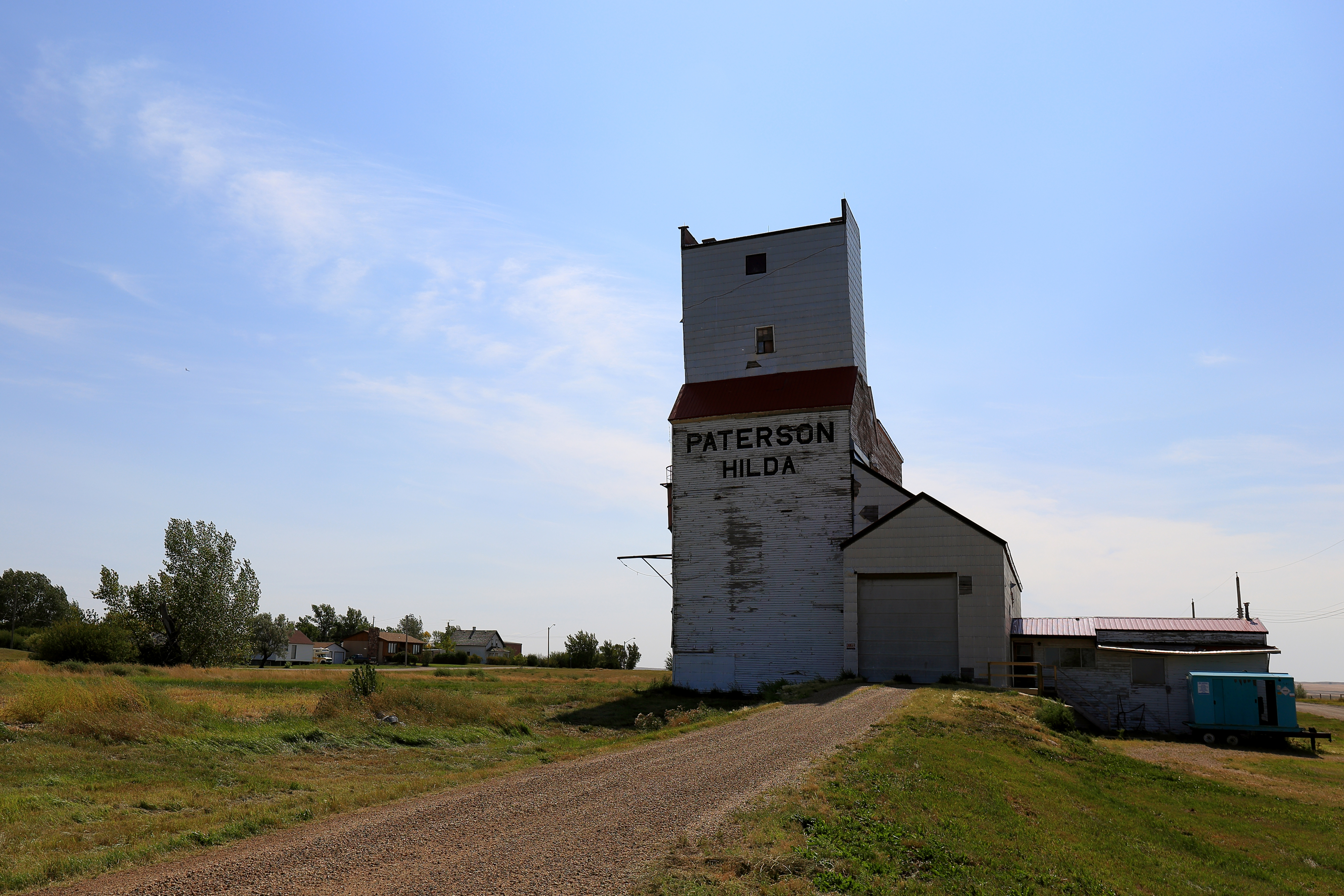
Disused grain elevator in Hilda, pictured in 2017.

Hilda was declared a hamlet in 1979. The Hilda School closed in 1989. St. James Church closed in 1996 and was purchased by the Medicine Hat Exhibition & Stampede, for use in its annual Pioneer Village showcase. After 82 years of operations, Austin General Store closed in 1997; this building also became part of Pioneer Village the next year.

Hilda's community association considers hosted celebrations for Hilda's 75th anniversary in August 1998. The association considers 1923, the year construction of the railroad began, to be the beginning of the hamlet as a distinct locality.

As of the early 2000s, the post office now operates out of Hilda's community centre. Hilda Bethlehem Lutheran Church celebrated a century of operations in 2010.

In October 2017, the Government of Alberta issued an Alberta Emergency Alert for a "serious grass and wildfire" in Cypress County. After winds pushed the fire towards Hilda, residents were evacuated on October 17. Volunteer firefighter, James Hargrave, died while on duty near Hilda. Around two percent of Hilda's residential properties, and "most" livestock owned by local ranchers, were lost to the fire.

== Services ==
=== Recreation ===
As of 2026, Hilda and Community Association operates Hilda's community hall. The association provides recreational and social events, as well as postal services, through Hilda's community hall. Hilda's disused schoolhouse is also maintained by the association.

=== Places of worship ===
Hilda Bethlehem Lutheran Church and Hilda Baptist Church remain operational as of 2026.

== Cemeteries ==
Several places of worship operated in the Hilda area during the 19th century, of which only their cemeteries remain.

=== Congregational Cemetery ===
A Congregational church operated six miles west and one mile south of Hilda between 1912 and 1935. The cemetery received its final interment in 1939.

=== Seventh Day Adventist Cemetery ===
The Hilda Seventh-day Adventist Church operated between 1919 and 1948. At its height, the congregation had forty members; by the end of the Second World War, only two families regularly attended services. Its cemetery remains accessible to the public as of 2026.

=== Salem Evangelical Cemetery ===
In 1930 an evangelical congregation relocated from Saskatchewan to two miles north of Hilda and built a church. The cemetery's last interment was in 1950, and the church building had been torn down by the 1990s.

=== Zion Lutheran Cemeteries ===
The Hilda Zion Lutheran Church operated in two sites near the town, occupying the first between 1912 and 1922, and a second between 1923 and 1969. Cemeteries remain at both sites.

== Demographics ==
Population history of Hilda
Year	Pop.	±%
1941	171	—
1951	169	−1.2%
1956	178	+5.3%
1961	194	+9.0%
1966	142	−26.8%
1971	82	−42.3%
1976	80	−2.4%
1981	75	−6.2%
1986	65	−13.3%
1991	43	−33.8%
1991A	44	+2.3%
1996	45	+2.3%
2001	55	+22.2%
2006	45	−18.2%
2011	37	−17.8%
2016	45	+21.6%
2021	40	−11.1%
Source: Statistics Canada

In the 2021 Census of Population conducted by Statistics Canada, Hilda had a population of 40 living in 19 of its 23 total private dwellings, a change of −11.1% from its 2016 population of 45. With a land area of 0.42 km^{2} (0.16 sq mi), it had a population density of 95.2/km^{2} (246.7/sq mi) in 2021.

As a designated place in the 2016 Census of Population conducted by Statistics Canada, Hilda had a population of 45 living in 19 of its 22 total private dwellings, a change of 21.6% from its 2011 population of 37. With a land area of 0.44 km^{2} (0.17 sq mi), it had a population density of 102.3/km^{2} (264.9/sq mi) in 2016.

== In popular culture ==
Scenes for post-apocalyptic movie Father of Nations (2022) were filmed in Hilda in 2019, using the hamlet's abandoned hotel and disused schoolhouse.

== See also ==
- List of communities in Alberta
- List of designated places in Alberta
- List of hamlets in Alberta
